= Mitsubishi Minicab =

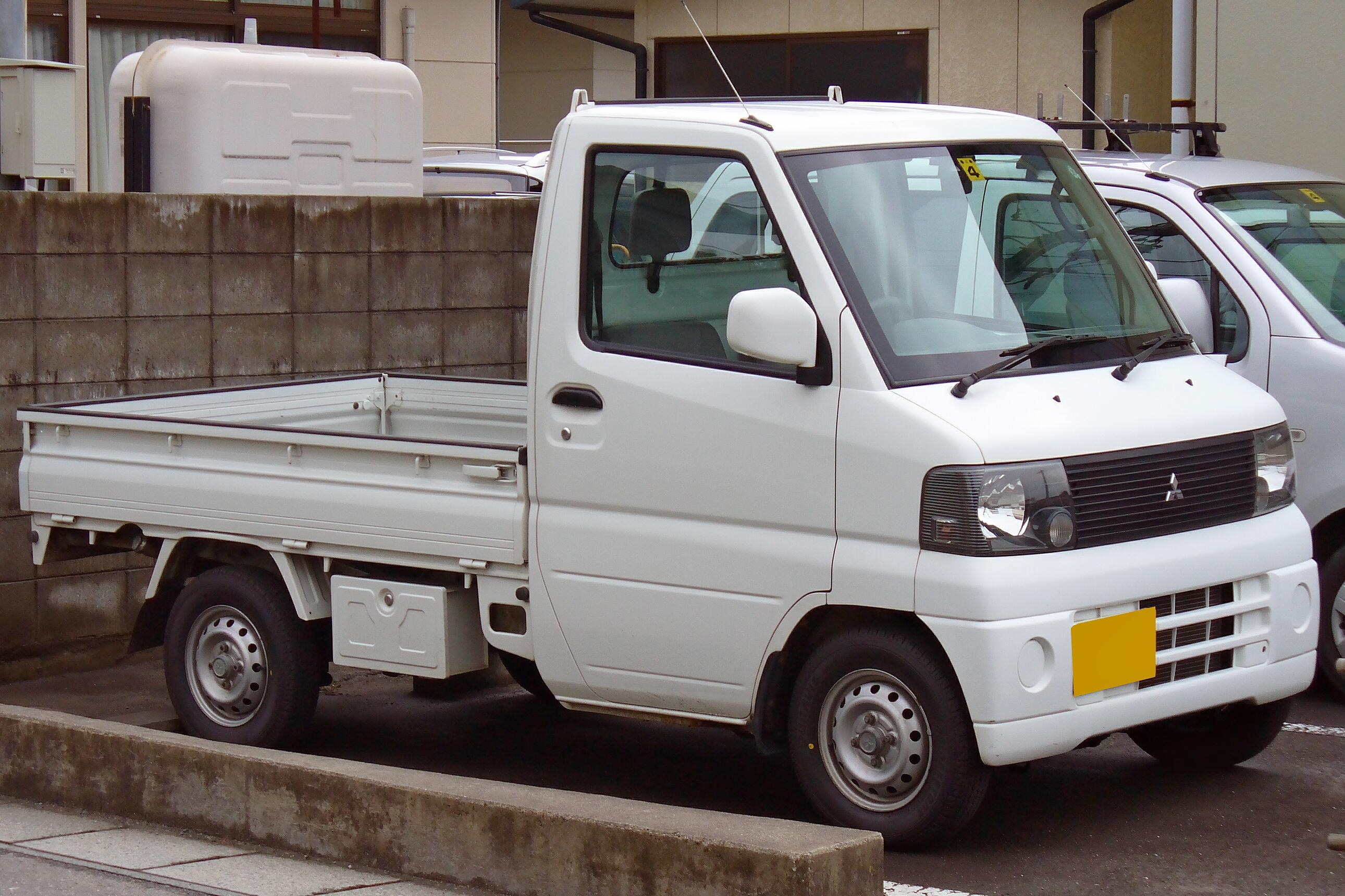

Overview
- Manufacturer: Mitsubishi Motors; Suzuki (seventh generation onwards)
- Also called: Mitsubishi/CMC Veryca (Taiwan); Mitsubishi Jetstar (Indonesia); Mitsubishi L100; Mitsubishi Multicab (Philippines); Nissan Clipper; Suzuki Carry (2014–present); Suzuki Every (2014–present)
- Production: 1966–present
- Assembly: Japan: Kurashiki, Okayama (Mizushima plant)

Body and chassis
- Class: Microvan; Kei truck Light commercial vehicle
- Body style: Van; Pickup truck
- Related: Mitsubishi Town Box

Chronology
- Predecessor: Mitsubishi 360

The Mitsubishi Minicab (Japanese: 三菱・ミニキャブ) is a kei truck and microvan, built and sold in Japan by Japanese automaker Mitsubishi Motors since 1966. In Japan, it was sold at a specific retail chain called Galant Shop. It was also sold by China Motor Corporation (CMC) in Taiwan as the CMC Veryca, starting in 1985. A battery electric model of the Minicab, called the Minicab MiEV, is sold in the Japanese market since December 2011.

Since February 2014, the Mitsubishi Minicab is a rebadged Suzuki Carry/Every, except for the Minicab MiEV/EV.

== First generation ==
First generation (LT30/LT31)
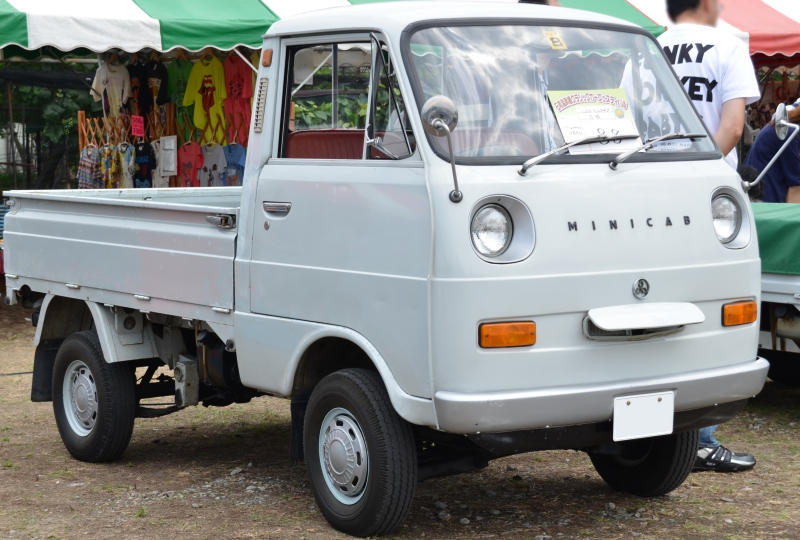
- 1966 Mitsubishi Minicab truck (LT30)

Overview
- Production: 1966 – 1971 (truck); 1968 – 1976 (van)
- Assembly: Mizushima plant, Kurashiki, Okayama, Japan

Body and chassis
- Body style: Pickup truck, microvan
- Layout: Front-engine, rear-wheel-drive

Powertrain
- Engine: 359 cc ME24D/24E/24F two-stroke I2
- Transmission: 4-speed manual

Dimensions
- Length: 2,990 mm (117.7 in)
- Width: 1,290 mm (50.8 in)
- Height: 1,610 mm (63.4 in)

The Minicab cabover pickup truck was launched in 1966 to replace the 360 trucklet, which by this time had adopted the same model name as the Minica sedan. Codenamed LT30, it shared the sedan's air cooled, two-stroke, 359-cc ME24 engine, and was available with cargo gates on three sides to simplify loading and unloading. A van version was introduced in 1968, available in four different equipment levels. The T30 truck was replaced in 1971 by the new Minicab EL, but the van was kept in production (now also called the Minicab EL) and updated with a dummy grille and headlight surround. The air-cooled T30V with its 26 PS (19 kW) ME24E engine was kept in production until 1976, with no further modifications except a 1974 adjustment to fit larger license plates. The better-equipped Super Deluxe version received the ME24F version of the engine with 30 PS (22 kW). About 224,766 first-generation Minicabs were built.

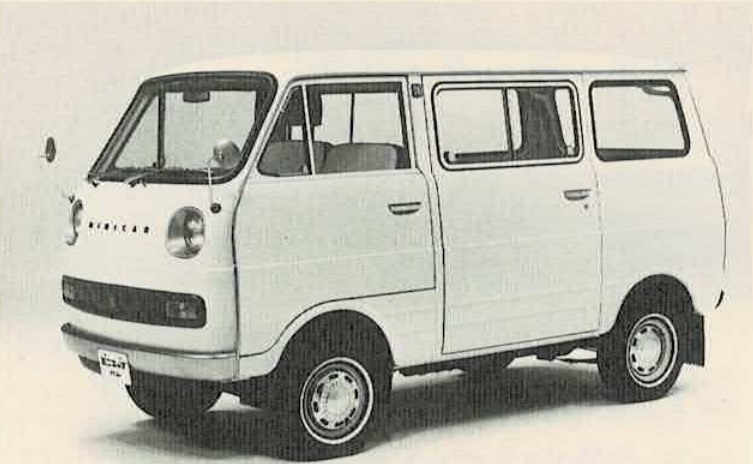
1968 Minicab Van

== Second generation ==
Second generation (T130/T131)
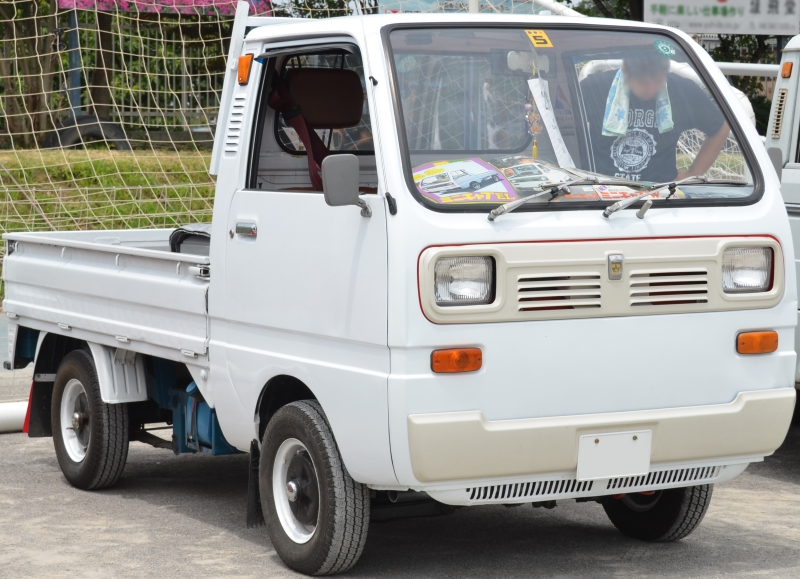
- Mitsubishi Minicab EL (T130, initial version)

Overview
- Production: 1971 – March 1976
- Assembly: Mizushima plant, Kurashiki, Okayama, Japan

Body and chassis
- Body style: Pickup truck, microvan
- Layout: Front-engine, rear-wheel-drive

Powertrain
- Engine: 359 cc ME24F two-stroke I2; 359 cc 2G10 two-stroke I2
- Transmission: 4-speed manual

Dimensions
- Length: 2,995 mm (117.9 in)
- Width: 1,295 mm (51.0 in)

In May 1971, the Minicab underwent its first model change, with the Minicab EL offering a new interior and a longer cargo bed. Called the T130, it was only available in truck form, with the old LT30 van soldiering on until the third generation was introduced in 1976. The reed valve-equipped ME24 engine produced 30 PS (22 kW) in all T130 versions, which included a standard bed and a dropside bed with either Standard, DeLuxe, or Super DeLuxe equipment. Ride quality was improved with the adoption of a front wishbone and rear leaf spring suspension. The EL received all new bodywork with tiny rectangular headlamps.

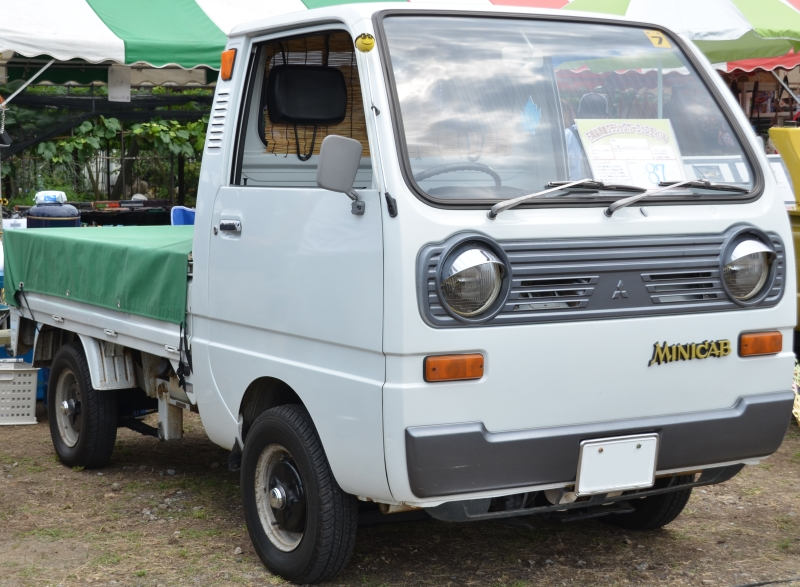
Mitsubishi Minicab W (T131, watercooled version as built between 1973 and 1975)

A panel box van was added to the Minicab truck lineup in September 1972, when it also became the Minicab W with the new water-cooled 2G10 engine (hence the W). This model carries the T131 chassis code, and is easily identified by its reworked front end, reverting to round headlights. It also carries a prominent "W" on the front, beneath the left headlight. The grille was altered and the headlights enlarged in September 1973, with the "W" replaced by a "Minicab" script. In January 1975, the Minicab received an emissions-cleaned engine using Mitsubishi MCA technology, still with 28 PS (21 kW). It was also modified to fit the larger, yellow license plates introduced for kei cars at the turn of the year, including additional plate lights. Three-point belts became standard fitment on the Super DeLuxe version and available as an option on the other models. Just under 210,000 second-generation Minicabs were built, making it the slowest-selling generation. The third generation, however, was mostly a heavily modified T130.

== Third generation ==
Third generation (L012/L013/L015)
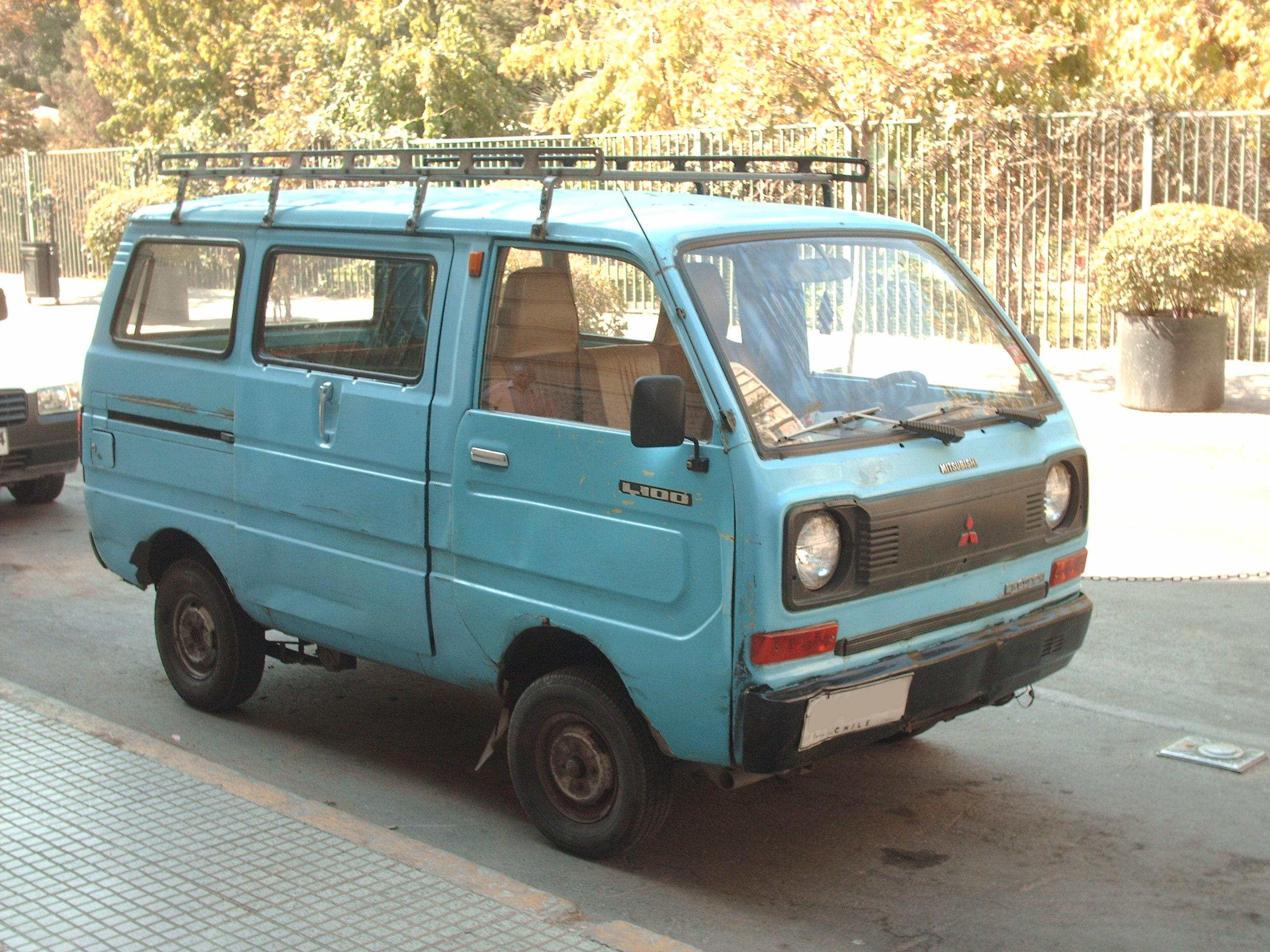
- Mitsubishi L100 (export version)

Overview
- Also called: Mitsubishi L100 (export)
- Production: April 1976 – May 1984; 1977–1986 (Indonesia)
- Assembly: Mizushima plant, Kurashiki, Okayama, Japan; Yangmei, Taiwan

Body and chassis
- Body style: Pickup truck, microvan
- Layout: Front-engine, rear-wheel-drive Front-engine, four-wheel-drive
- Related: Wuling LZ110

Powertrain
- Engine: 471 cc 2G22 I2; 546 cc 2G23/G23B I2; 644 cc 2G24 I2

Dimensions
- Wheelbase: 1,760 mm (69.3 in)
- Length: Minicab 5: 2,995 mm (117.9 in); All others: 3,190 mm (125.6 in)
- Width: Minicab 5: 1,295 mm (51.0 in); All others: 1,395 mm (54.9 in)
- Height: 1,660–1,900 mm (65–75 in)

In April 1976, the third-generation Minicab was introduced. In keeping with the changes in vehicle tax regulations, the Minicab 5 (L012) featured an increase in length, and adopted the enlarged 471-cc Vulcan S engine from the passenger car line, still with the same maximum power as the 360. It also incorporated new features such as a windscreen defroster, a central console box, and a central ventilation system. This engine did not take full advantage of the new regulations, which allowed up to 550 cc, and was only used in a short-lived group of interim models.

It was modified again in April 1977, when it was widened and received a full 546-cc engine and the new name "Minicab Wide 55" (L013). Power was increased marginally to 29 PS (21 kW). It continued until 1979, when the grille was altered and power was increased by two horsepower. This model was thoroughly updated in 1981, when the engine was changed to the timing belt-equipped G23B, producing the same 31 PS (23 kW) as the version it replaced. At the same time, the name was changed back to simply "Minicab", dropping "Wide 55" from the name as the market was now considered to be aware of the increase in body size and engine capacity. At the same time, the chassis code was switched to L015. Beginning in November 1981. the export-market L100 received the 2G24, a 644 -cc version of the new engine. These cars received small "650" badging at the front. In 1982, the flat-floor van model adopted a double-walled construction to offer a flat, open cargo area. The four-wheel drive (4WD) model was also introduced in 1982, when the range received a minor facelift. Overall, 768,393 third-generation Minicabs (L012, L013, L015) were built.

For some export markets, such as Chile and Argentina, this version was known as Mitsubishi L100, correlating with the L200 truck and L300 vans.

In China the third generation was built and sold as both the Shenwei SYW 1010 and as the Liuzhou Wuling LZ 110. The LZ 110 was available as a van or as a truck, and had Mitsubishi's larger 800 cc engine as fitted to certain other Mitsubishi export versions.

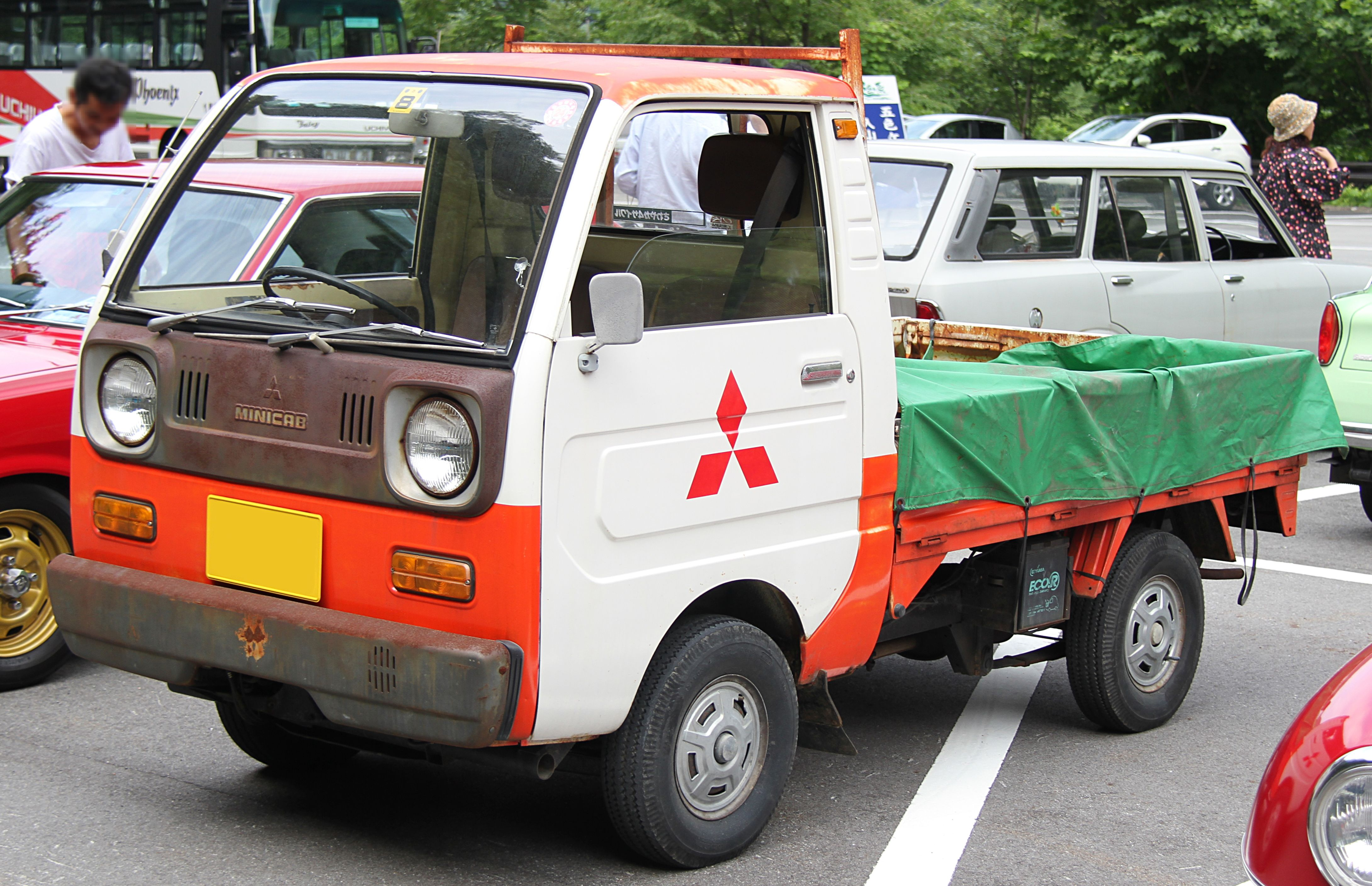
Original Minicab 5 truck, narrower and with a different front panel (1976–1977)

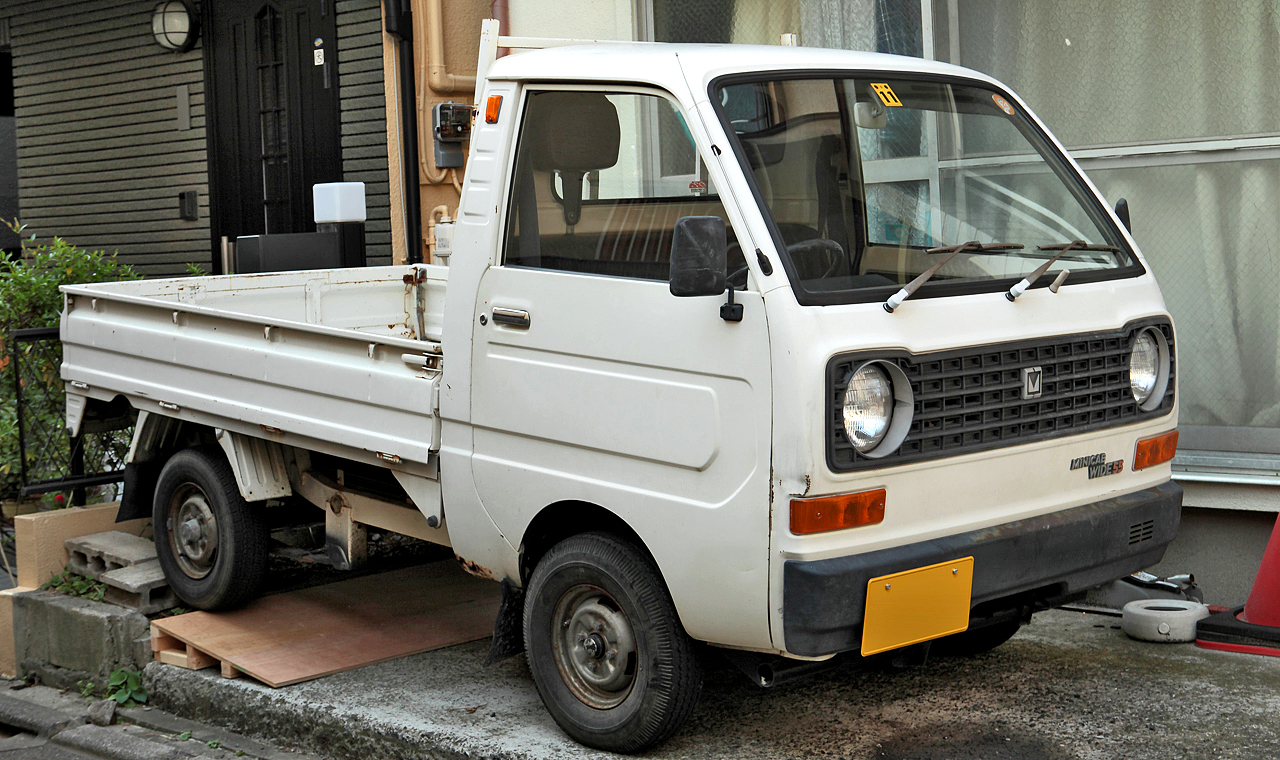
First facelift Minicab Wide 55 truck (1977–1979)

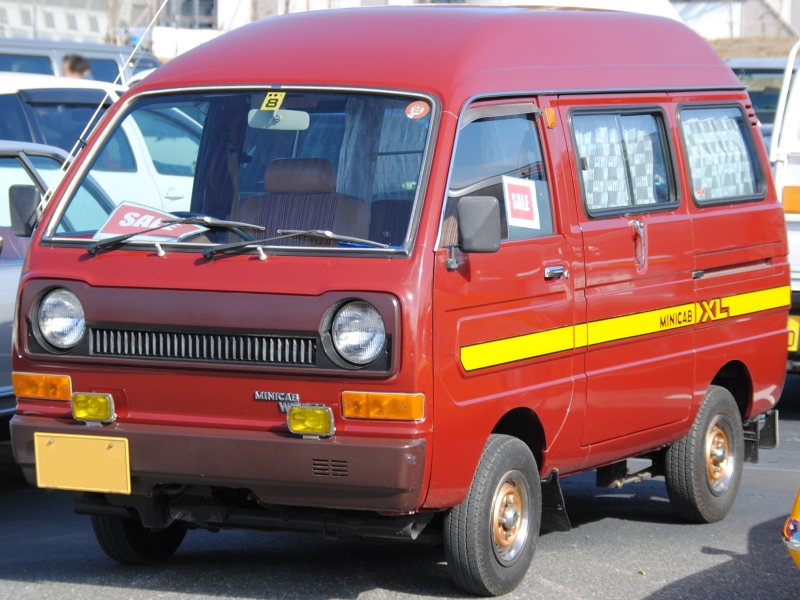
Second facelift Minicab Wide 55 Van XL (1979–1981)

== Fourth generation ==
Fourth generation (U11/12/14/15/18/19)
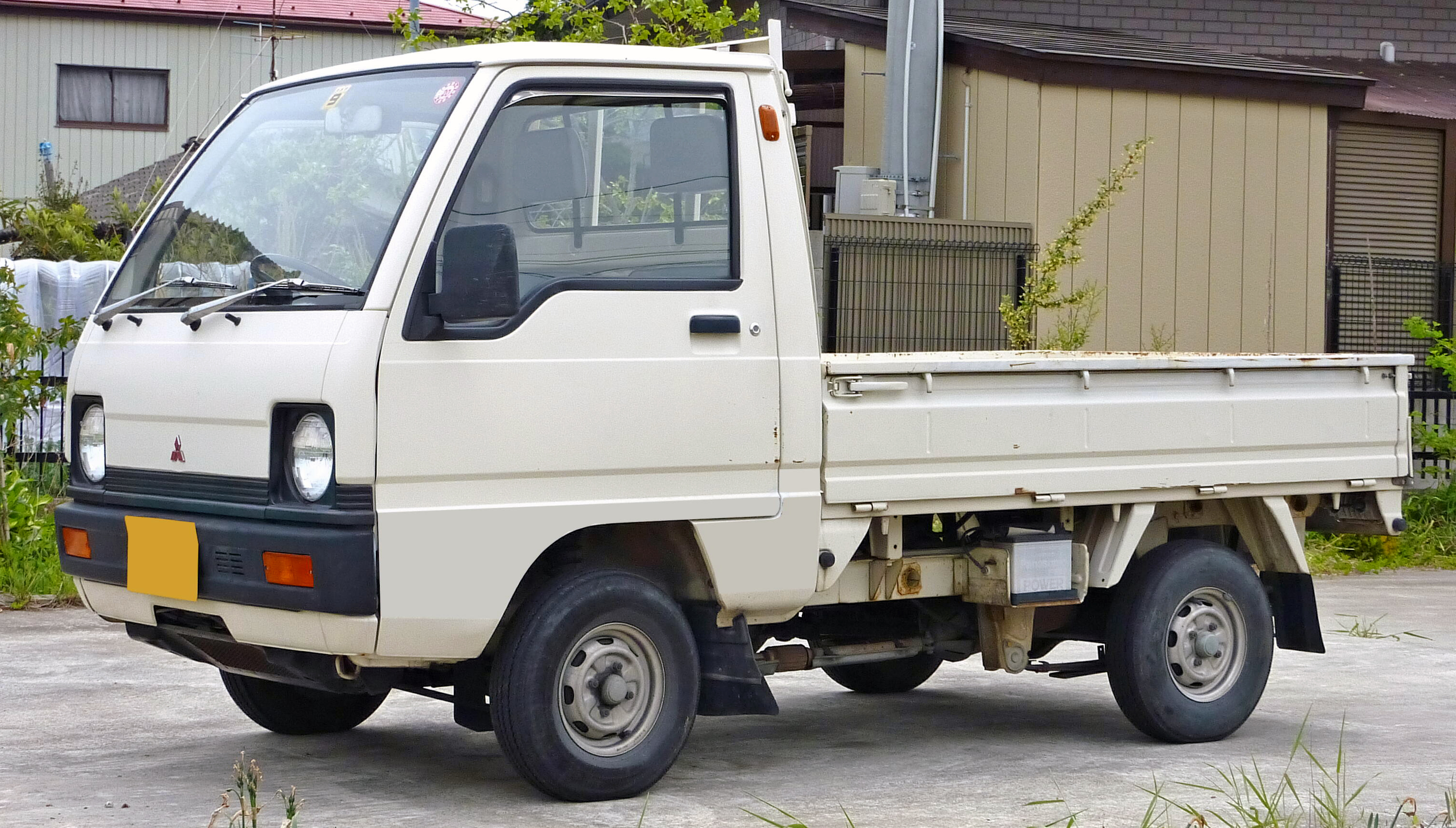
- Minicab Super Deluxe truck (U11T)

Overview
- Manufacturer: Mitsubishi Motors
- Also called: Mitsubishi Jetstar (Indonesia); Mitsubishi Mighty Mits (USA); Mitsubishi Minicab Bravo; CMC Verica; Wuling Dragon (China)
- Production: June 1984 – January 1991; 1990–2009 (China); 1987–1991 (Indonesia)
- Assembly: Japan: Kurashiki, Okayama (Mizushima); China: Liuzhou (SAIC-GM-Wuling); Indonesia: Cikarang, West Java (MMKI); Taiwan: Yangmei

Body and chassis
- Body style: Pickup truck, microvan
- Layout: Front-engine, rear-wheel-drive Front-engine, four-wheel-drive
- Related: Cushman White Truck/Van

Powertrain
- Engine: 546 cc G23B I2; 548 cc 3G81 I3; 548 cc 3G81 SC I3; 657 cc 3G83 I3; 993 cc CB20 I3 (Indonesia)

Dimensions
- Wheelbase: 1,780 mm (70.1 in)
- Length: 550 cc: 3,195 mm (125.8 in); 660/1000 cc: 3,225 mm (127.0 in); Vans: 3,265 mm (128.5 in)
- Width: 1,395 mm (54.9 in)

Chronology
- Successor: Mitsubishi Colt T120SS (Indonesia)

Further model range updates have been in parallel with the Minica. In June 1984, the range was updated, becoming the fourth-generation U11/12 series (2WD/4WD). Although improvements were made to enhance the Minicab's commercial applications, the most noticeable changes were made to support personal leisure activities. Angular headlamps played an important role in the Minicab's styling, along with larger windows to improve visibility. A rear window wiper, electronic locking rear gate, and power brakes were adopted. Mitsubishi offered 15 front- and 4WD van model variations and 10 truck variations. Better-equipped, more passenger-oriented four-seater van models were initially sold as Minicab Estate; in January 1989 this was renamed the Minicab Bravo. This generation (collectively referred to as the U10) was built until November 1990, eventually reaching the U19 chassis code. In total, 707,348 fourth-generation Minicabs were built.

1990 Minicab NX van (U19V)

Additional models went on sale in February 1985, and it received a small facelift in September of that year. In February 1986, the van range received two additions: a 2WD automatic and a dual-range, five-speed 4WD model. In June 1987, a more thorough change took place as the two-cylinder Vulcan-II engine was replaced with the three-cylinder Cyclone (3G81). A supercharged model was added to the lineup, which was now called U14/U15. In August 1988 there was a facelift, and in April 1989 the NX and Bravo AX models were added (both with four-wheel drive). In January 1990, naturally aspirated models were upgraded to the 657 cc 3G83 engine (U18/U19), as a result of new regulations, while a minor facelift with bigger front and rear bumpers increased the length marginally. Vans were now 3,265 mm (128.5 in) long, while trucks were 3,225 mm (127.0 in). The car did not take full advantage of the new rules, as it was a rather short-lived interim model, and supercharged versions continued to use the smaller engine until they were discontinued in 1990. Those received a "G" at the end of the chassis codes, meaning that a 4WD supercharged van would now be the U15VG, and so on.

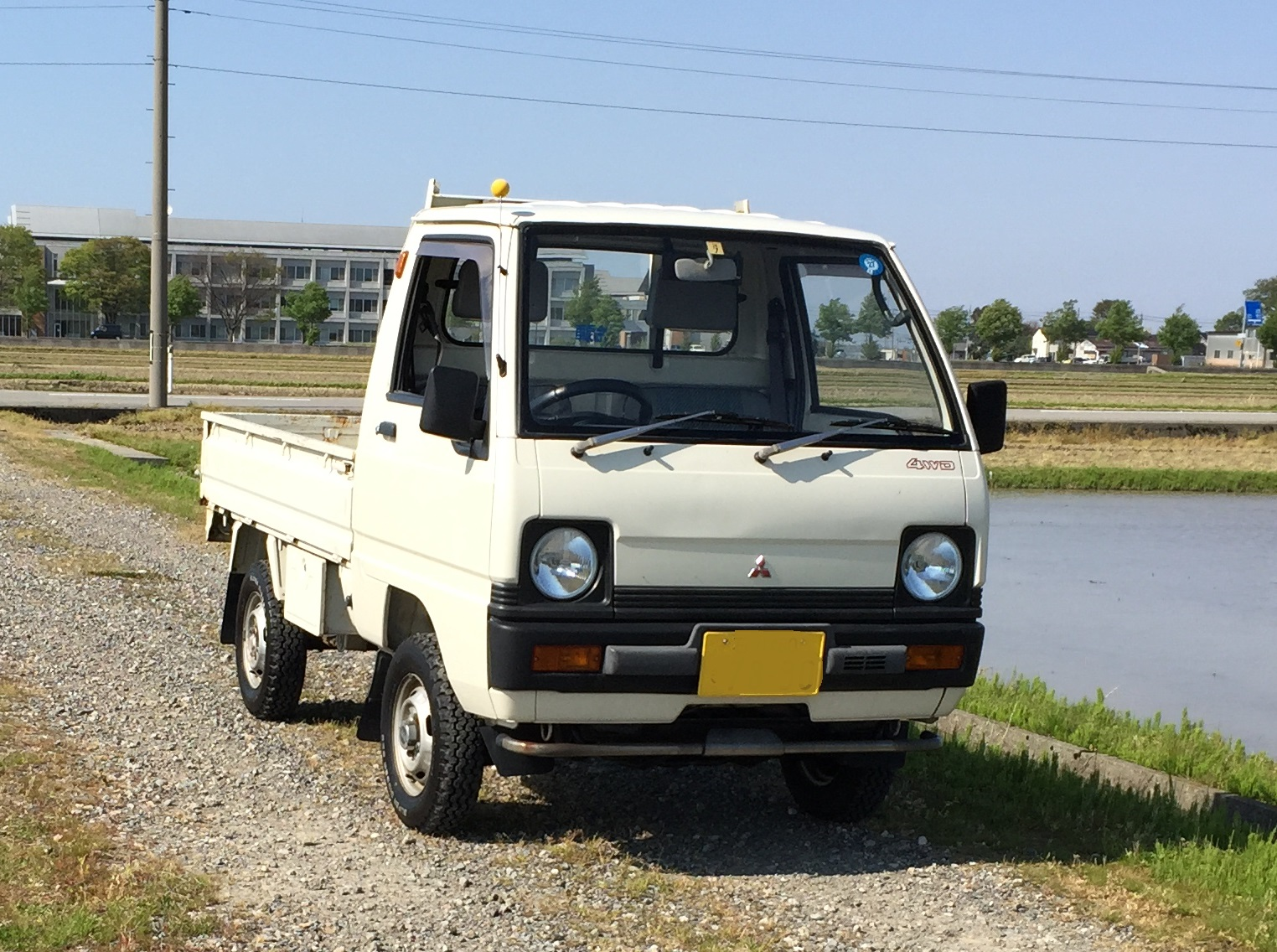
1990 Minica Super Deluxe 4WD truck (U19T)

The fourth-generation Minicab incorporated many class-leading features, such as an automatic free-wheel hub adopted on all 4WD models, while 2WD models had a turning radius of 3.7 metres (12.1 ft). The estate models featured the first sliding sunroof in their class. In 1987, the Minicab became the first manufacturer to offer a supercharged kei truck. It was also marketed in the United States for off-road purposes only, where it was sold as the "Mighty Mits". These offered left-hand drive and a 22 kW (30 PS; 30 hp) version of the 550-cc 3G81 engine. A variety of versions were on offer, with or without doors, with all-terrain wheels, and with an available high roof.

In China the fourth generation Minicab was built and sold as the Wuling LZW 1010 for the commercial variants and the Wuling LZW 6330 for the passenger variant from 1990 to 2009.

=== Mitsubishi Jetstar ===
From 1987 until 1990, a wider version with a longer rear end was built and sold in Indonesia as the "Jetstar". Rumor said, the name of "Jetstar" came from the combination of "jet" (Daihatsu Hijet) and "star" (Mitsubishi's three-diamond emblem that looks like a star).

This Indonesian built Minicab was powered by a 993-cc, three-cylinder Daihatsu engine (CB20) from the Daihatsu Hijet. This occurred because in 1981, the government declared that no engine built in Indonesia was to be of less than 1.0-L displacement by 1985. As the result, manufacturers of local microvans and trucks scrambled to install larger engines. At that time, though, Mitsubishi did not have an engine of suitable displacement and instead used an engine from Daihatsu. In 1991 the Jetstar was replaced by the Mitsubishi Colt T120SS, based on the eighth-generation Suzuki Carry.

=== CMC Varica and CMC Veryca ===
In Taiwan, long-wheelbase iterations of the fourth-generation Minicab were also available with a variety of bodywork. The Taiwanese version (built by China Motor Corporation) was called the CMC Varica (中華威利, Zhōnghuá Wēi Lì) and was available with a 1061-cc 4G82 engine with 58 PS (43 kW). Overall length was up to 3,645 mm (143.5 in), with a wheelbase lengthened to 1,475 mm (58.1 in) right in front of the rear axle. Top speed was 115 km/h (71 mph). The Varica's nose was also extended somewhat.

The CMC Varica was imported to the United States by Cushman and sold as the Type G, also known as the Cushman White Truck or White Van.

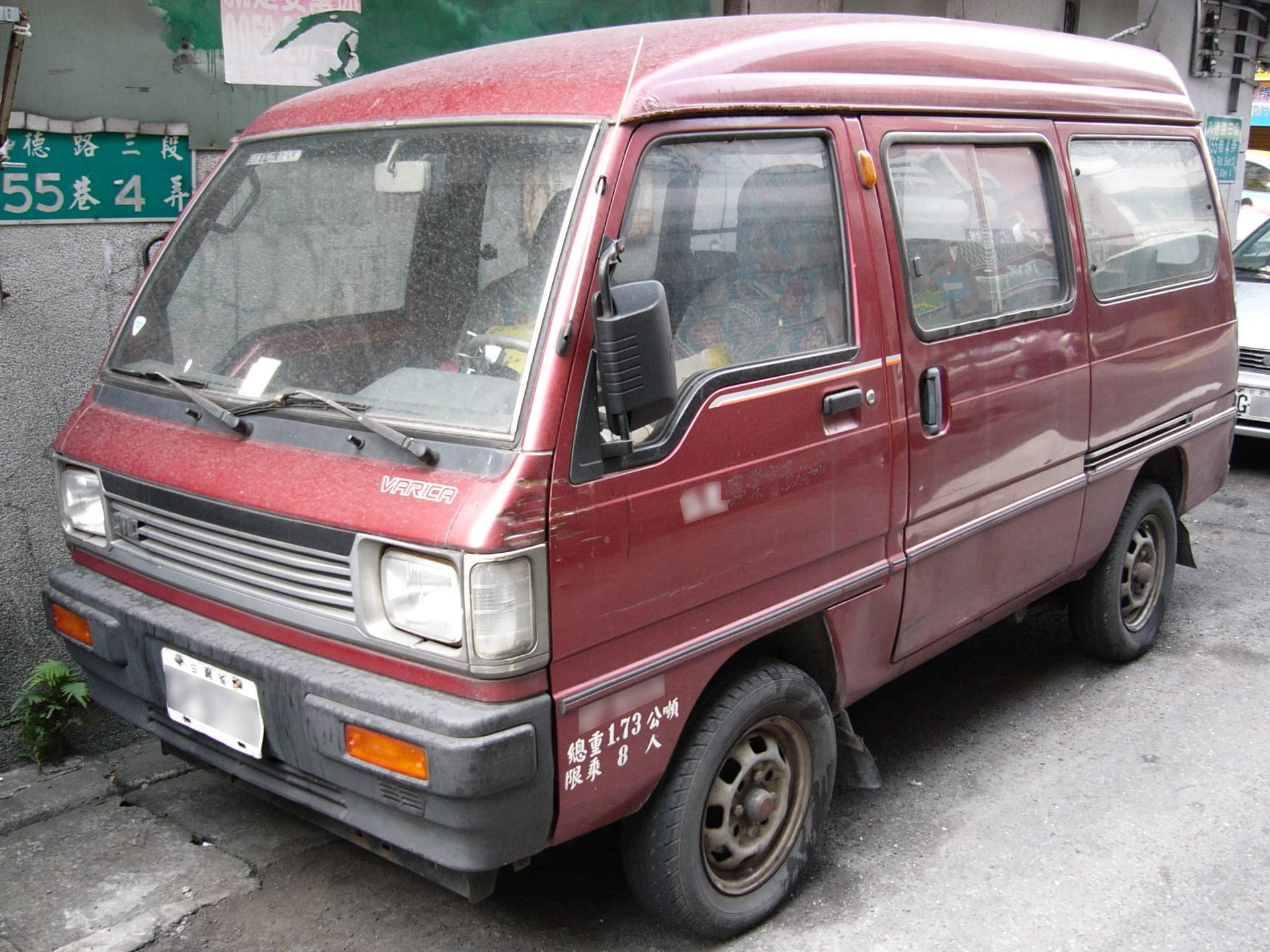
Pre-facelift CMC Verica 1100DX van

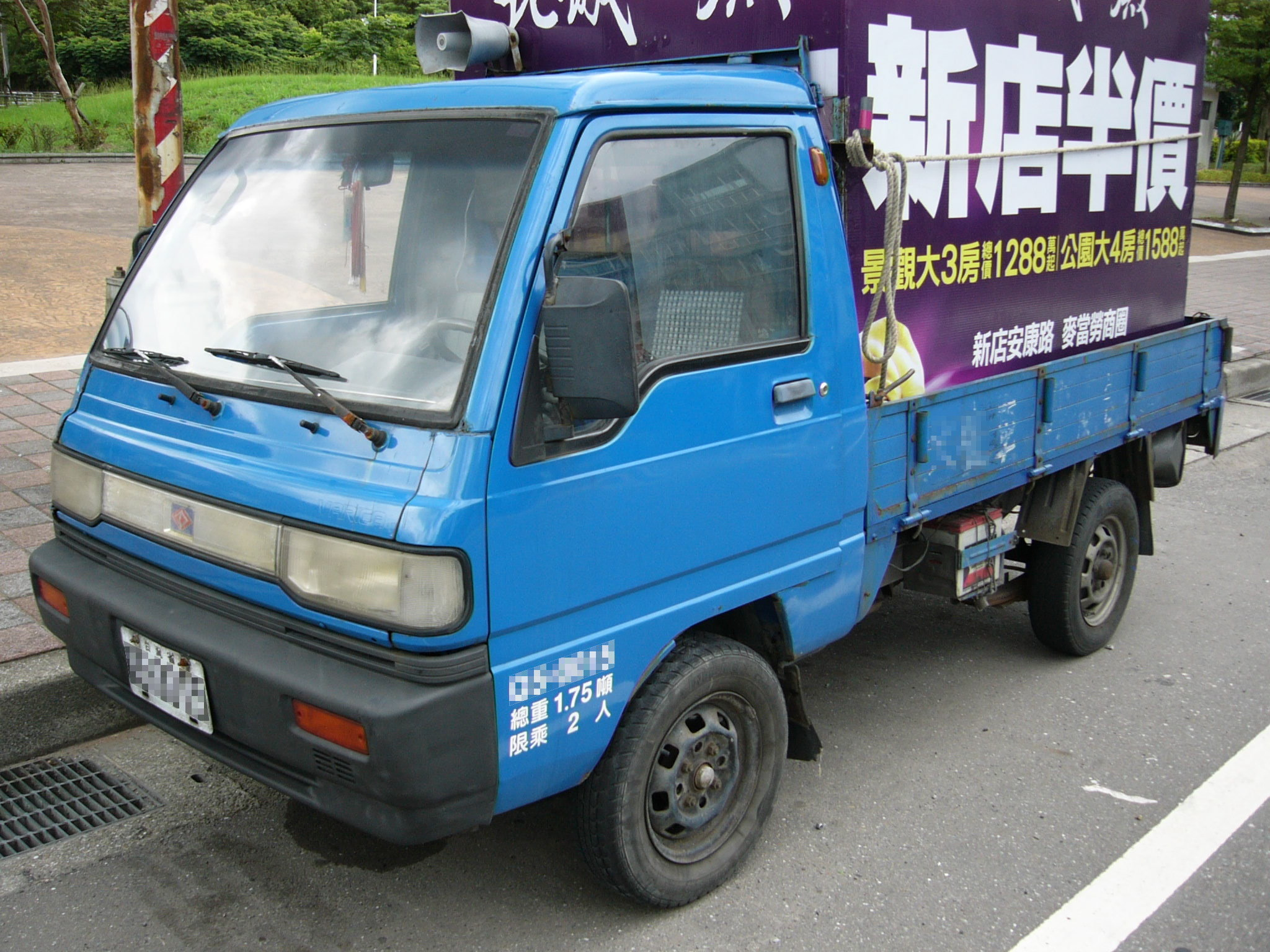
First facelift CMC Verica 1100DX truck

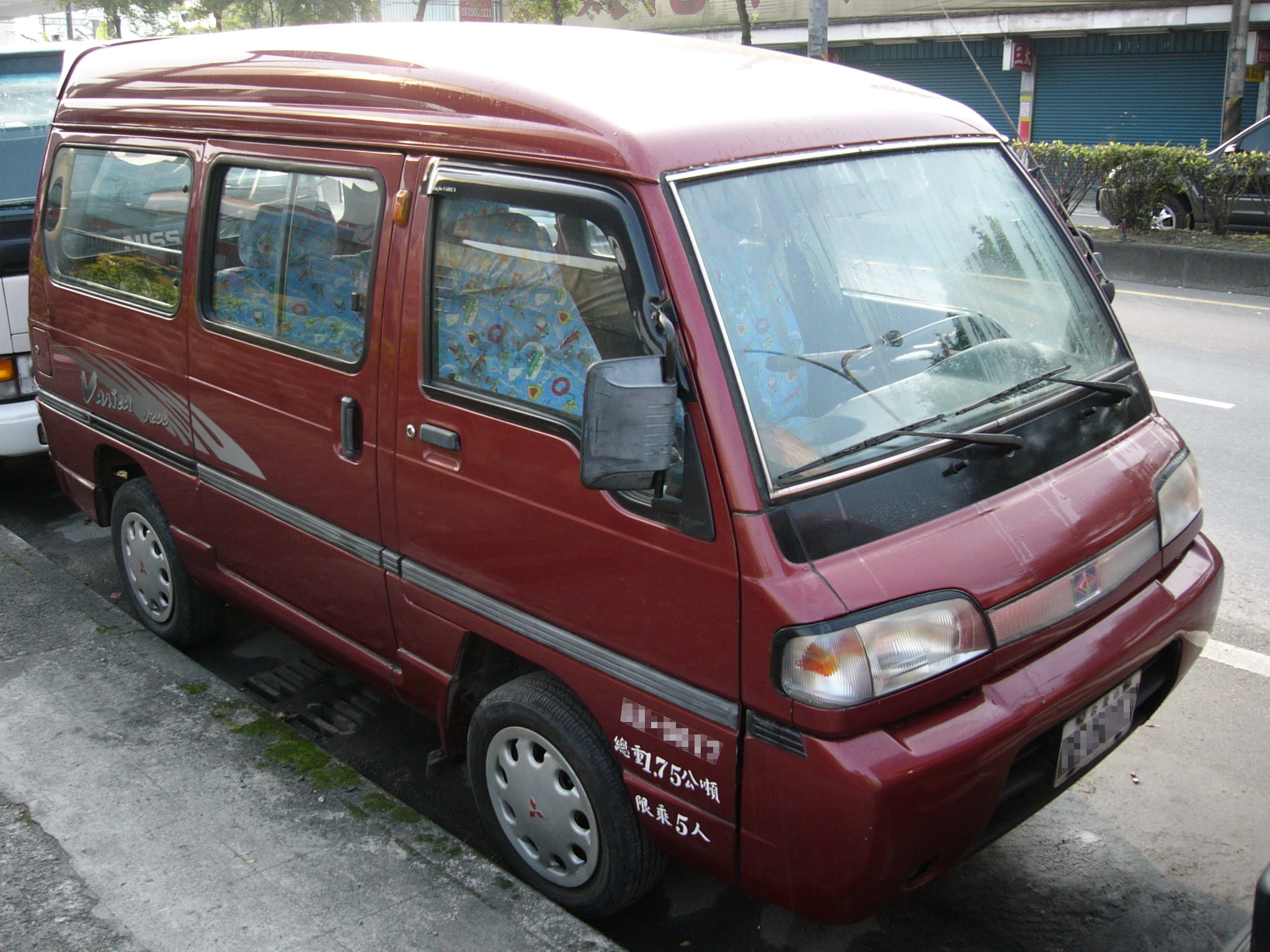
Second facelift CMC Verica 1200 van

== Fifth generation ==
Fifth generation (U41/42/43/44)
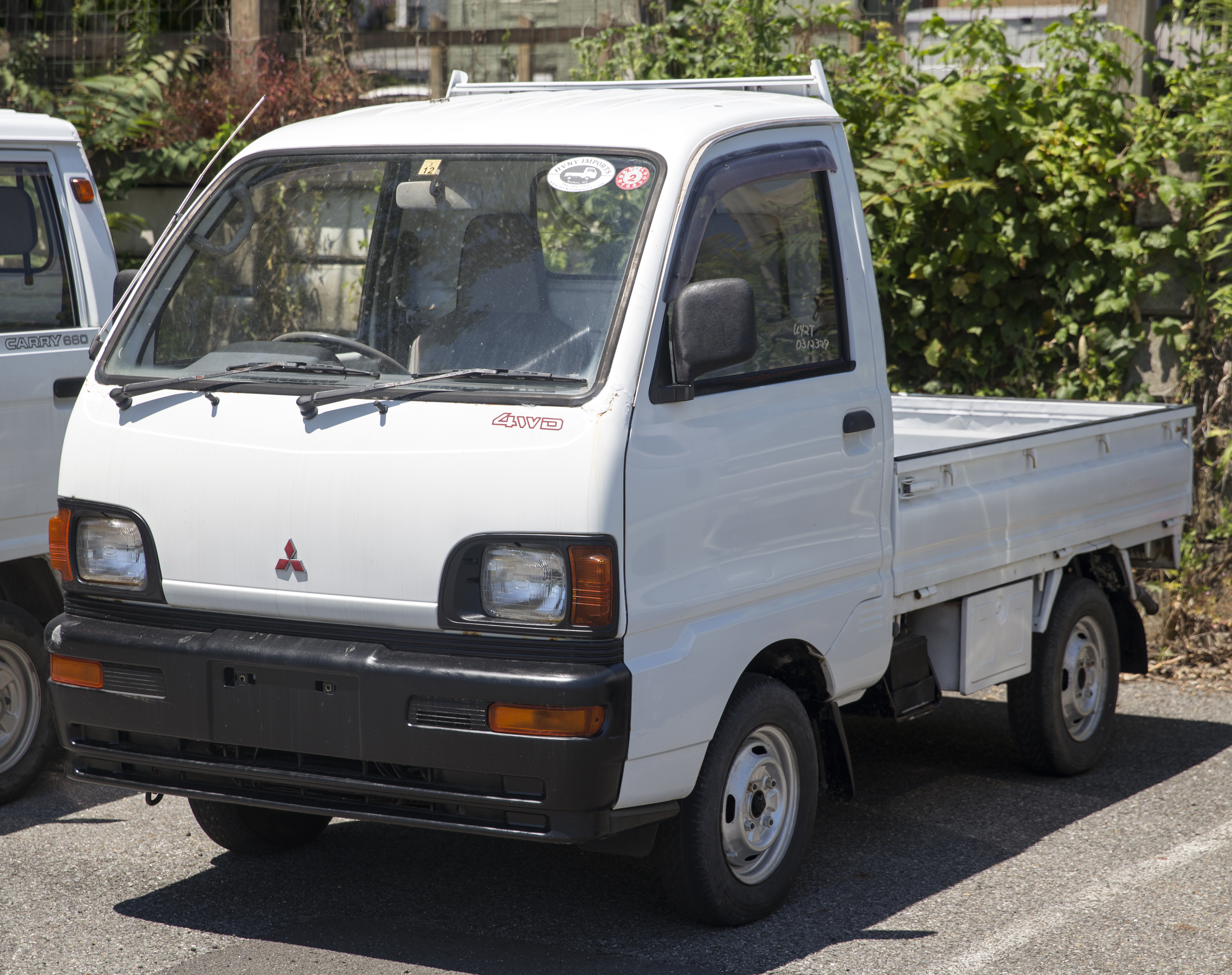
- Minicab TS truck (first facelift)

Overview
- Manufacturer: Mitsubishi Motors
- Also called: Mitsubishi Bravo
- Production: February 1991 – January 1999
- Assembly: Mizushima plant, Kurashiki, Okayama, Japan

Body and chassis
- Body style: Pickup truck, microvan
- Layout: Front-engine, rear-wheel-drive Front-engine, four-wheel-drive

Powertrain
- Engine: 657 cc 3G83 I3; 657 cc 3G83 12V I3; 657 cc 3G83 DOHC 15V I3; 657 cc 3G83 DOHC 15V turbo I3; 659 cc 4A30 16V I4; 659 cc 4A30 DOHC 20V turbo I4
- Transmission: 4/5-speed manual 3-speed automatic

Dimensions
- Wheelbase: Truck: 1,830 mm (72.0 in); Van/Bravo: 1,920 mm (75.6 in)
- Length: 3,295 mm (129.7 in)
- Width: 1,395 mm (54.9 in)
- Curb weight: Truck: 650–790 kg (1,430–1,740 lb); Van: 720–850 kg (1,590–1,870 lb); Bravo: 780–990 kg (1,720–2,180 lb)

A larger and completely redesigned Minicab (U40-series) was released in February 1991 to take full advantage of tax regulations allowing for increased dimensions and engine capacity of kei cars. Three new 660-cc engines were introduced - a four-valve, SOHC unit; a five-valve, DOHC unit (Bravo only); and a two-valve, SOHC unit. The high-roof truck model was discontinued; Van models were two-seaters only in the Japanese market. Four-speed manual transmissions were typical on the Minicab Truck at first, with the five-speed being reserved for the top TL model. A three-speed automatic was also optional on the Minicab TD truck. Across the range, 66 model variations were possible. Vans and Trucks originally shared a taillight design. The two-valve engine was only available in the absolute base model, the TU, which was also the only version equipped with 10-inch wheels and drum brakes up front as well as at the rear. Power output is 38 and 42 PS (28 and 31 kW) at 5,500 and 6,000 rpm respectively for the two-valve and the four-valve units. The Minicab received minor improvements in January 1992 in the form of better waterproofing for the electrics and in January 1993 the five-speed manual became standard fitment on all models except the base version with 10-inch wheels.

In February 1994, the fifth generation Minicab received some exterior changes. The headlamps were changed to SAE standard square lamps, replacing the original round units. The trip meter which had been installed on the top grade versions (TL truck, CL van) was discontinued, leaving only an odometer. In addition, the tail lamp design of the van has been changed to a dedicated original type. The Bravo received a new halogen headlight design fitted into the same opening as those of the Minicab, but cut off at the bottom. In January 1996 the Minicab underwent a second minor change and was now equipped with the same halogen lights as used on the Bravo since 1994 (some work-oriented versions like the dump truck and the panel van continued to use the earlier design). The steering wheel was changed to a two-spoke unit borrowed from the base Minica. The very basic Minicab truck Type V arrived in May 1996, using the same carburetted four-valve engine, 12-inch wheels, and front disc brakes as the rest of the range but with the earlier, rectangular headlights (1994 design) and a four-speed manual transmission on both the 2WD and the 4WD models. A fuel injected engine with 48 PS (35 kW) was introduced on the better equipped vans and trucks in October 1997, eventually spreading down the range. Simultaneously, to allow the price to be kept down during a time of economic stagnation, the Type V reverted to the original carburetted two-valve engine and was now also available as a Van. In all, 723,772 fifth-generation Minicabs were built.

Minicab TD truck (initial model, 1991–1994)

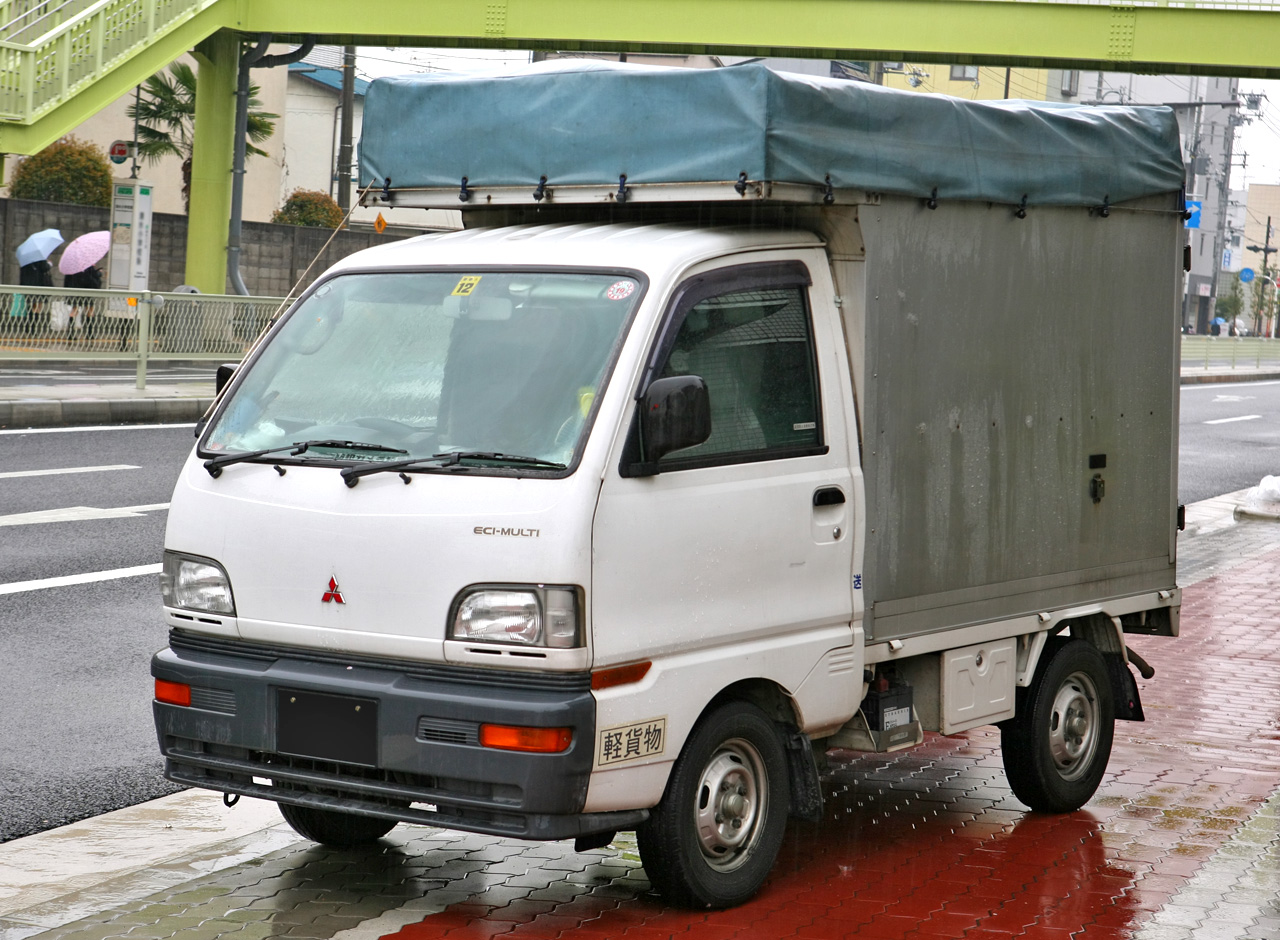
1997–1999 Minicab truck (second facelift)

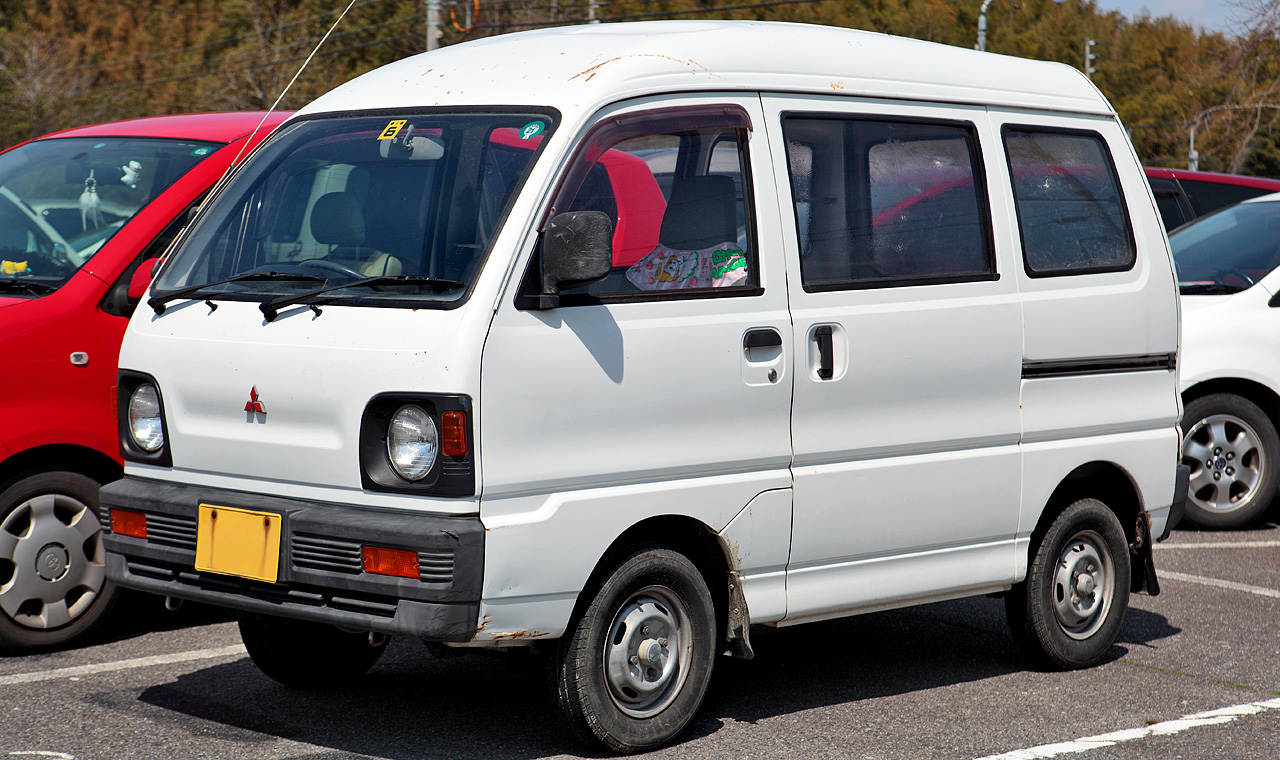
Minicab Van (initial model, 1991–1994)

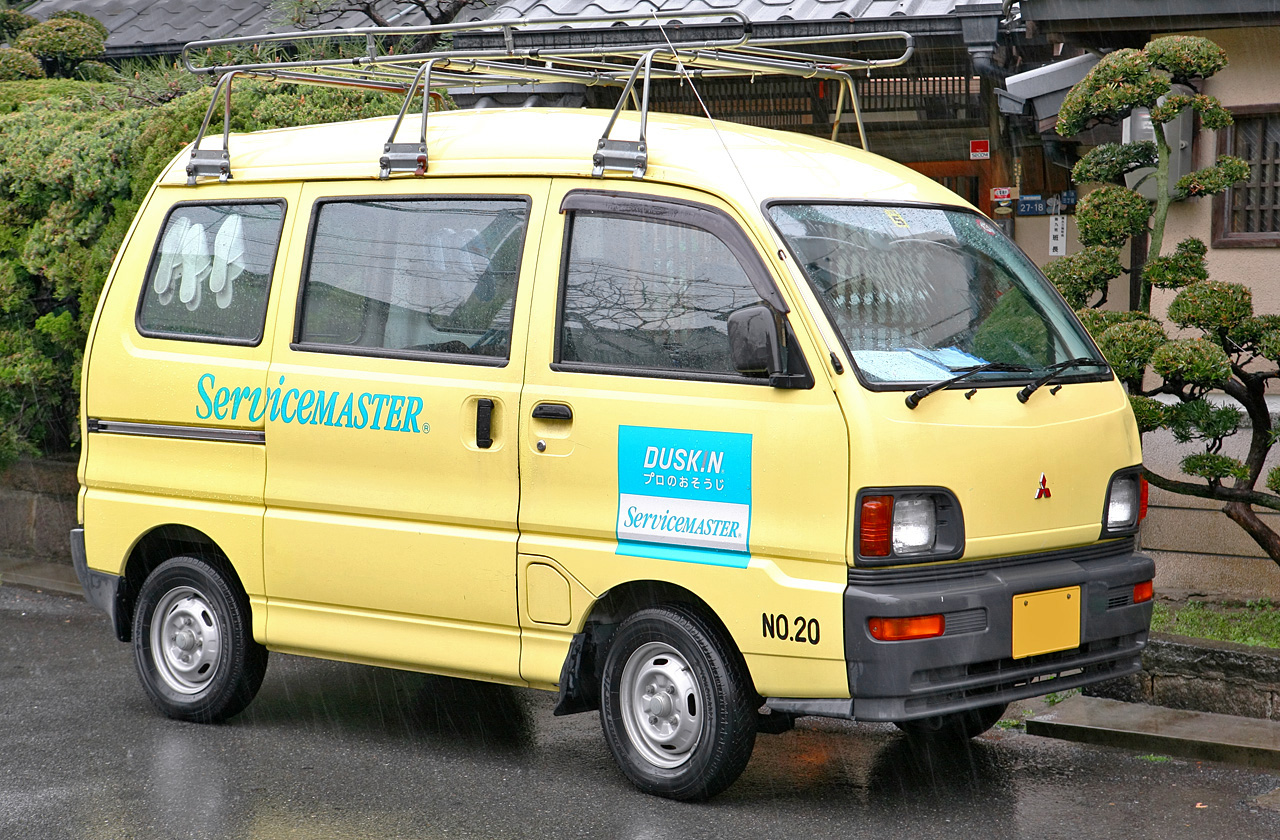
Minicab Van (first facelift)

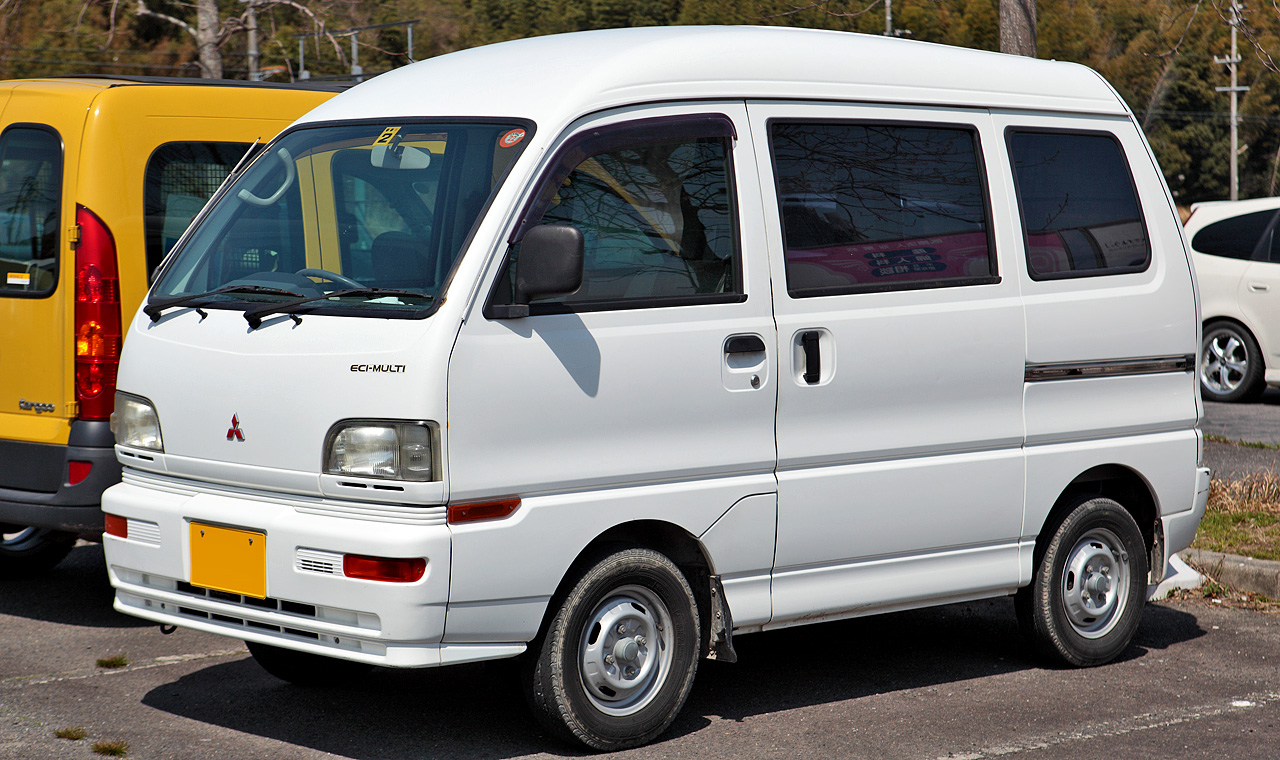
Fifth generation Minicab Van (second facelift)

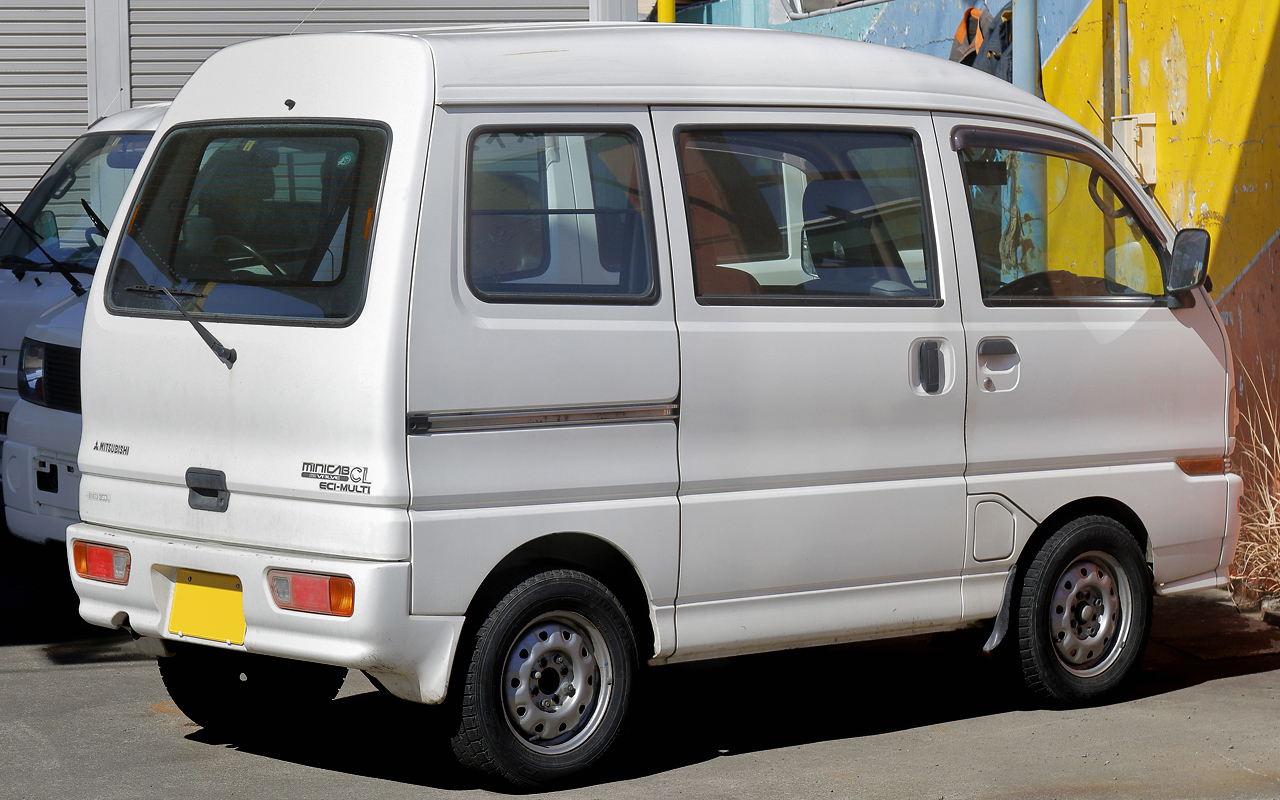
Minicab CL van; rear view (facelift)

=== Bravo ===
The new Bravo (no longer using the "Minicab" moniker) came fitted with unusual, concave, oval headlights. At the time of introduction, the lower end of the Bravo range received the 12-valve carburetted engine as also used in the Minicab trucks and vans, while more expensive versions were equipped with a fuel injected version with five valves per cylinder which was never offered on the commercial line. Outputs are 42 and 50 PS (31 and 37 kW) respectively. In January 1992, a turbocharged, 64 PS (47 kW) version of the 15-valve engine was made available in the new MZ-G and MZ-R models. In January 1994, the new 4A30 four-cylinder engine replaced the 3G83 in all but the lowest-priced versions, which kept the old carburetted 12-valve version. The 16-valve single-cam model was available either carburetted or fuel injected and produces either 44 or 52 PS (32 or 38 kW). The twin-cam, 20-valve "GT" model was only offered with fuel injection, turbocharger, and an intercooler but claimed power remained at the 64 PS (47 kW) limit to which Japanese manufacturers had agreed. From August 1997, the Bravo lineup also included a new variant, the retro-styled Bravo Route 66.

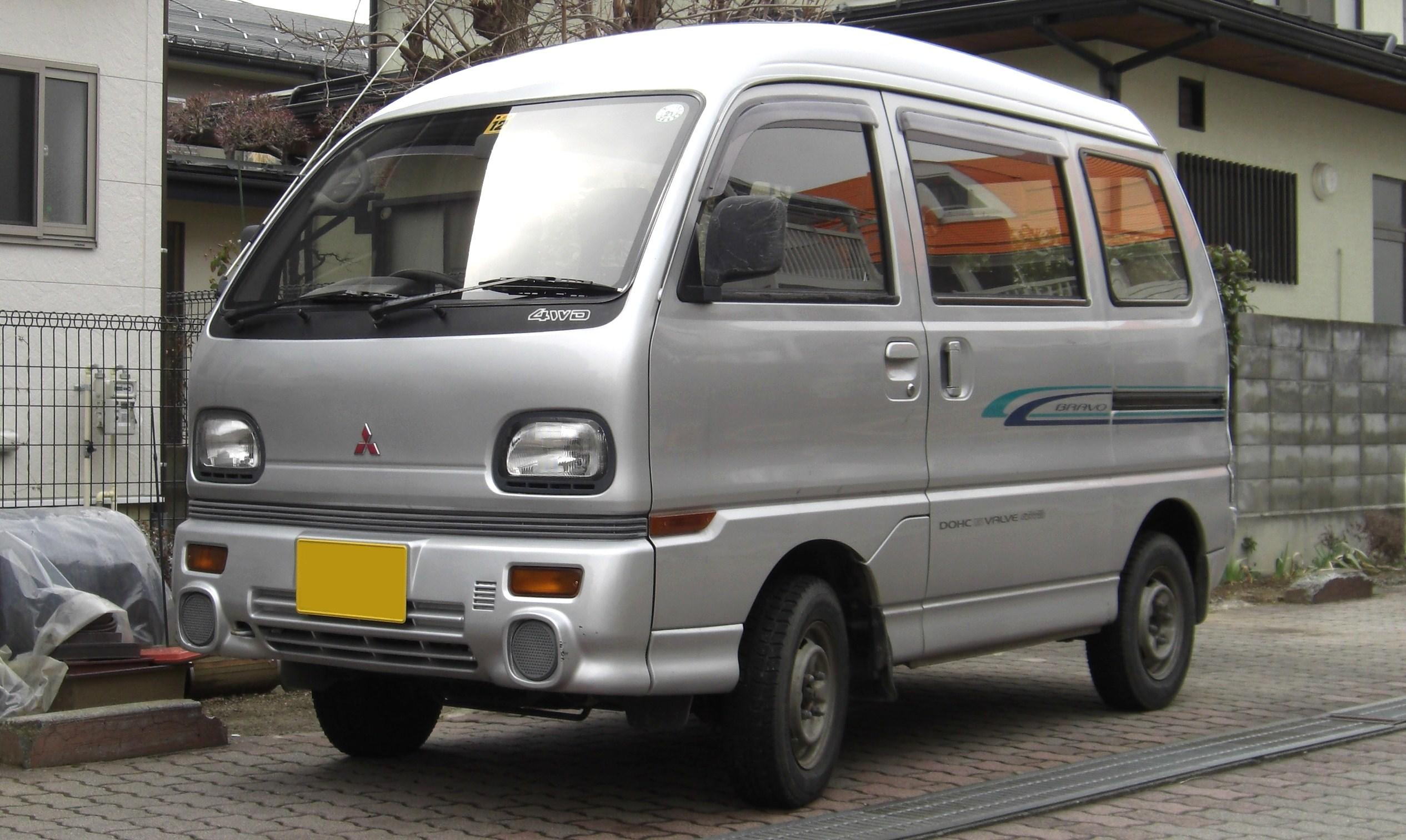
Mitsubishi Bravo 660 MG-i (initial model)

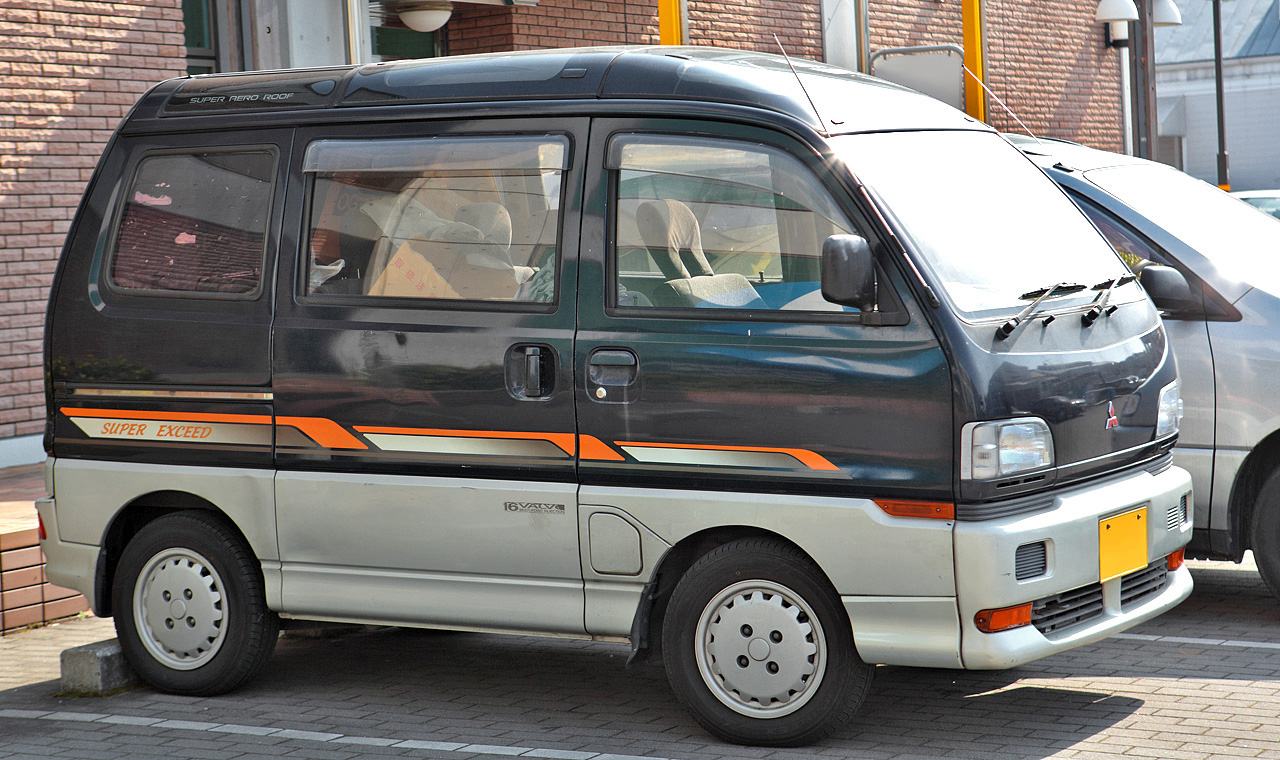
Mitsubishi Bravo Super Aero Roof Super Exceed (U43V, 1994 facelift model)

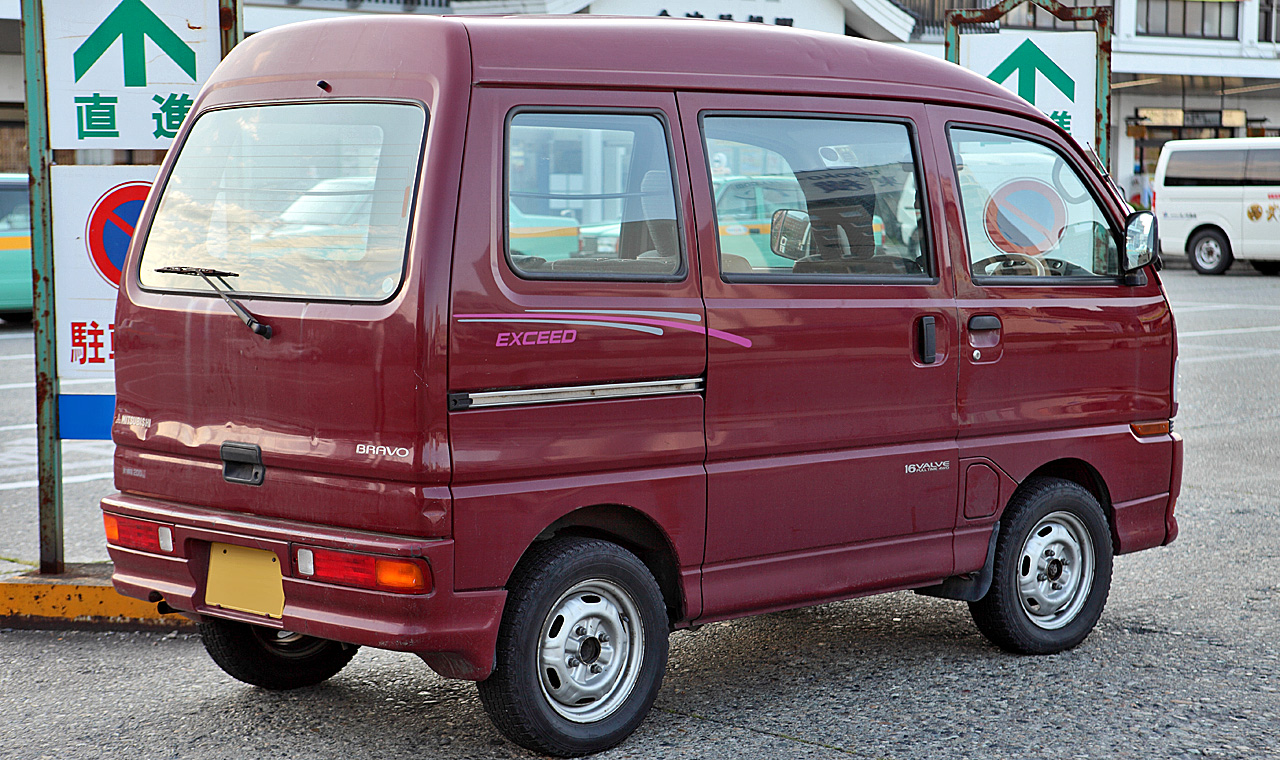
Mitsubishi Bravo Hi-roof Exceed (rear view)

== Sixth generation ==
Sixth generation (U61/62/68/69)
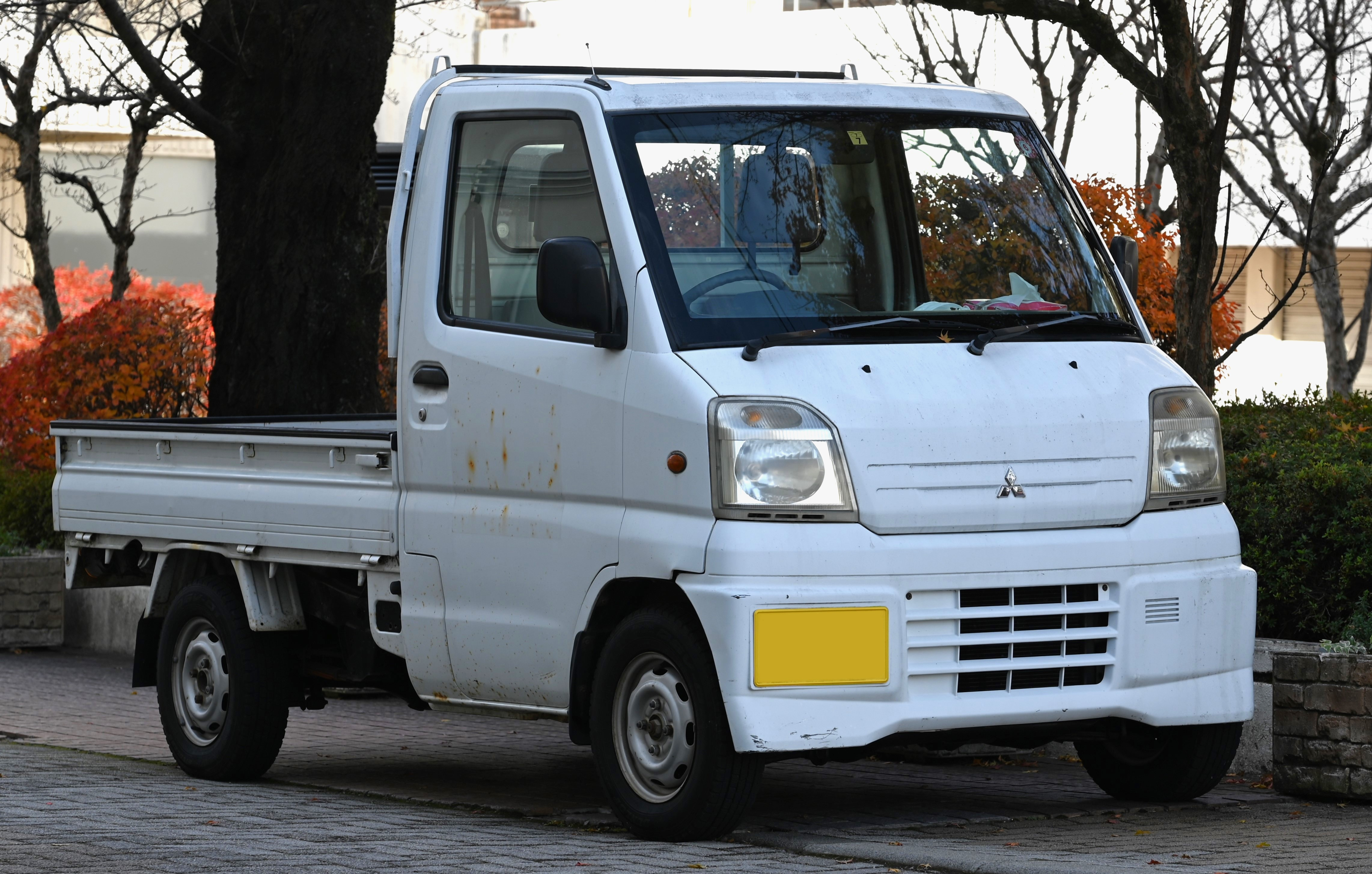
- 1999‐2000 Mitsubishi Minicab truck (pre-facelift)

Overview
- Also called: Mitsubishi/CMC Veryca (Taiwan); Mitsubishi L100 (Indonesia); Nissan Clipper (2003–2013; 2024–Present)
- Production: February 1999–February 2014; December 2011–present (MiEV/EV)
- Assembly: Japan: Kurashiki, Okayama (Mizushima plant); Indonesia: Cikarang, West Java (MMKI, van only)

Body and chassis
- Body style: Van; Pickup truck
- Layout: Front-engine, rear-wheel-drive Front-engine, four-wheel-drive
- Related: Mitsubishi Town Box (1999–2011)

Powertrain
- Engine: 657 cc 3G83 12V I3; 657 cc 3G83 12V turbo I3
- Transmission: 4/5-speed manual 3-speed automatic

Dimensions
- Wheelbase: Truck: 2,200 mm (86.6 in); Van: 2,390 mm (94.1 in)
- Length: 3,395 mm (133.7 in)
- Width: 1,475 mm (58.1 in)
- Height: 1,785–1,940 mm (70.3–76.4 in)
- Curb weight: Truck: 700–860 kg (1,540–1,900 lb); Van: 860–1,030 kg (1,900–2,270 lb); MiEV: 1,110 kg (2,450 lb)

The sixth-generation Minicab (U60-series) was introduced in February 1999, now sporting a new semi-front design. By April 1999, a "wagon" version called the Town Box was introduced. The unusual front design, with its trapezoidal headlights, was quickly changed for a more squared off look in December 2000. 419,070 petrol-engined U60s were built, but the Minicab MiEV remains in production as of 2025 (renamed "Minicab EV" in December 2023, by which time around 13,000 examples had been built).

Minicab Truck

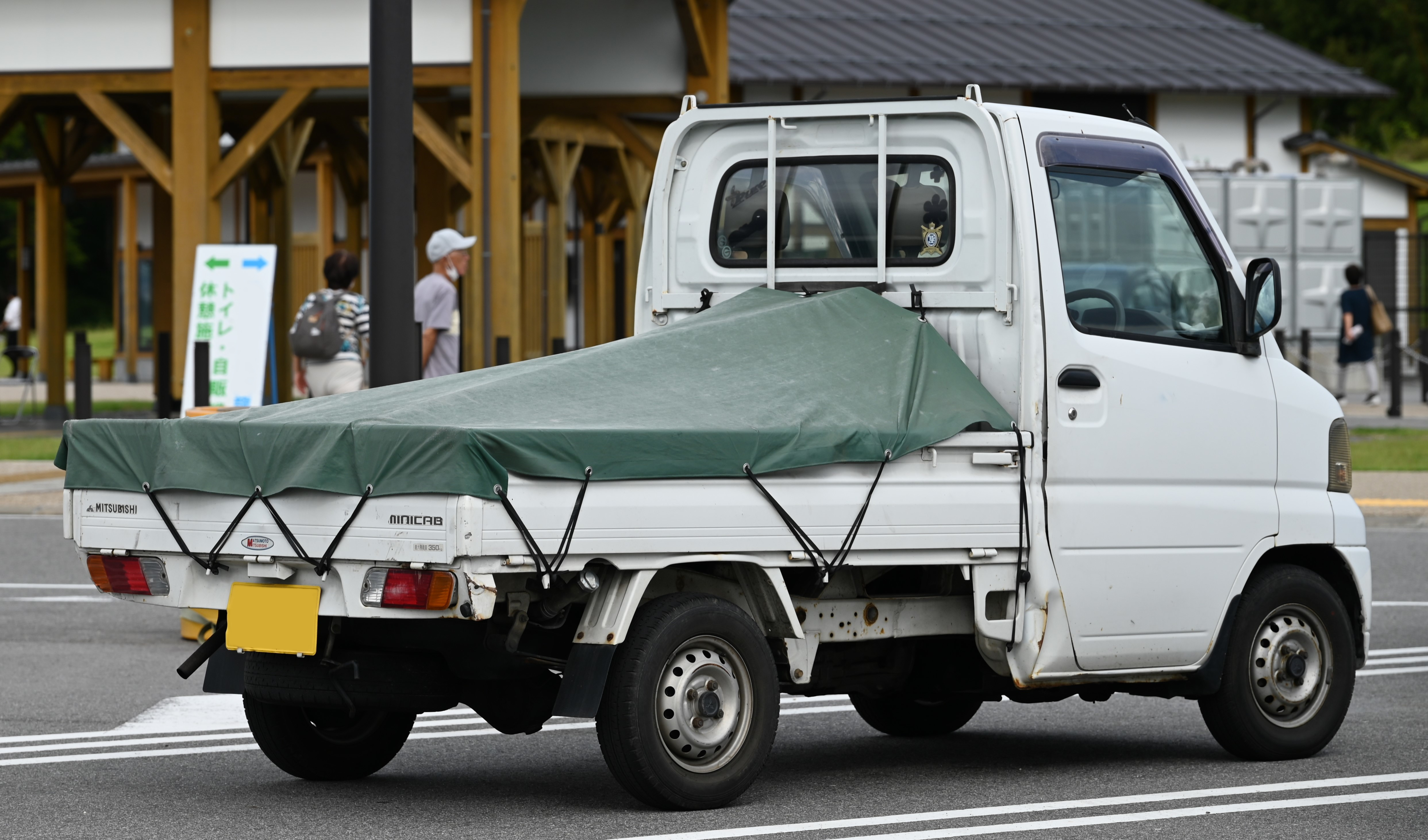
Rear view

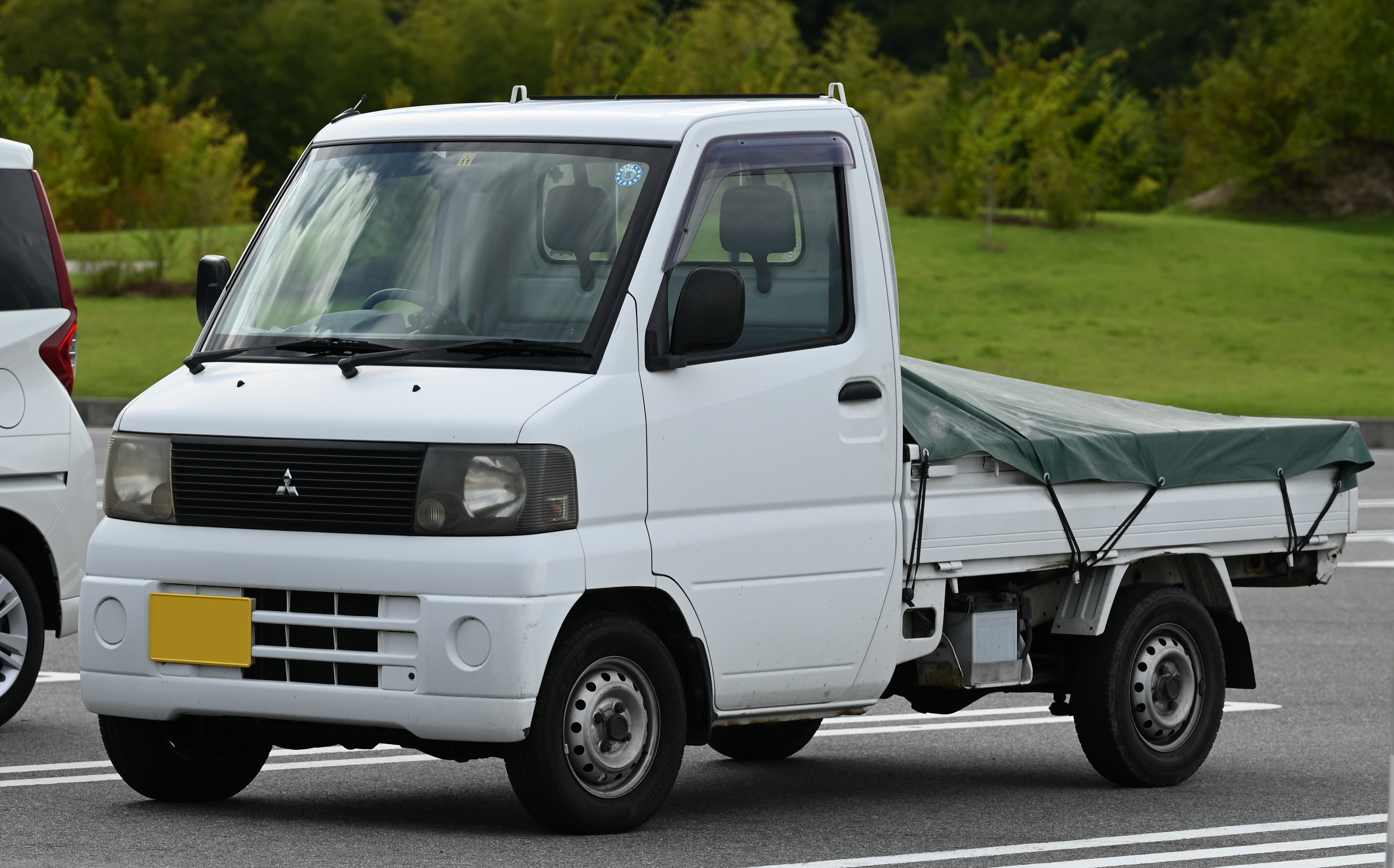
Mitsubishi Minicab Truck (2000 facelift)

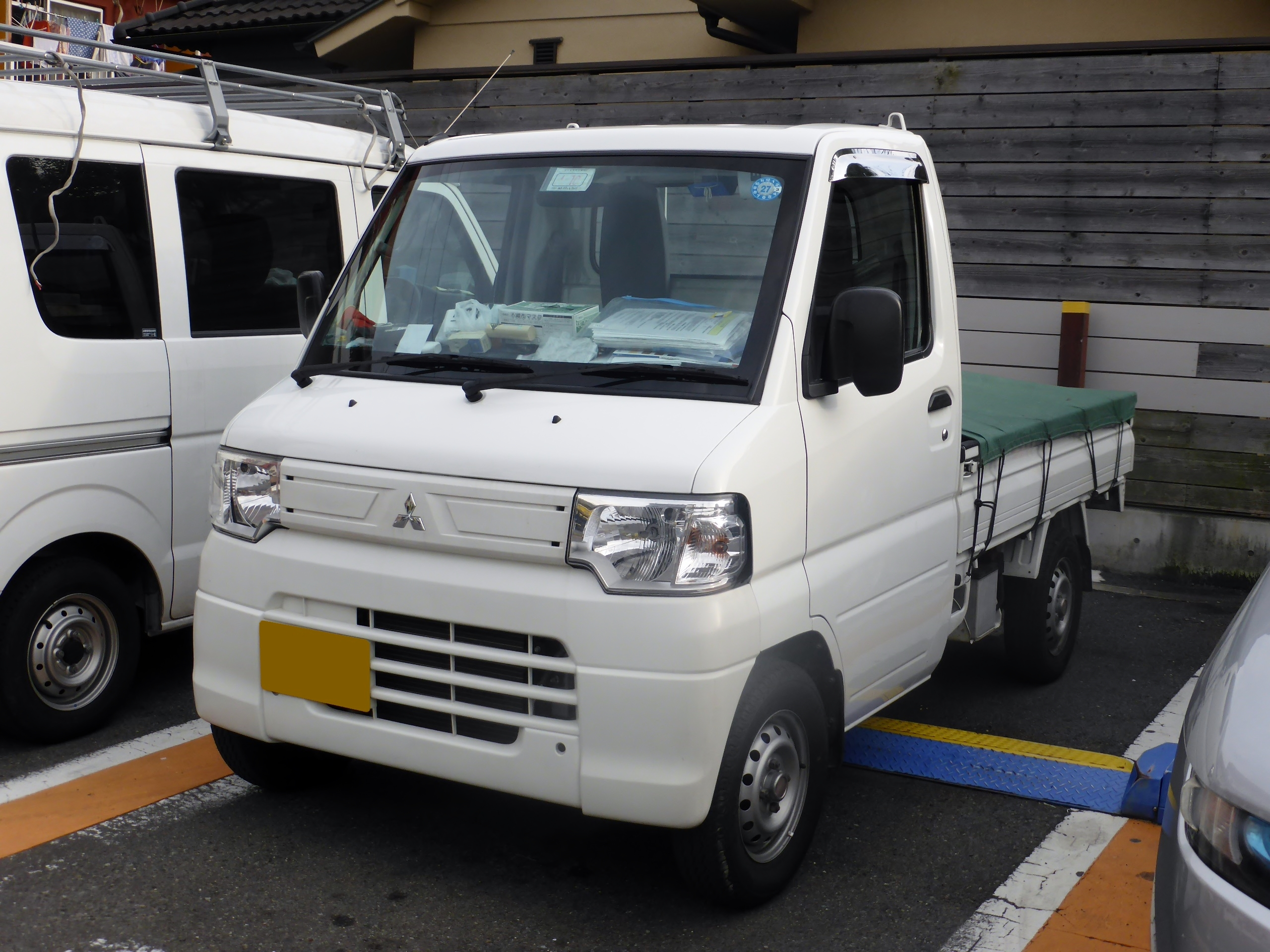
Minicab Truck (2011 facelift)

Minicab Van

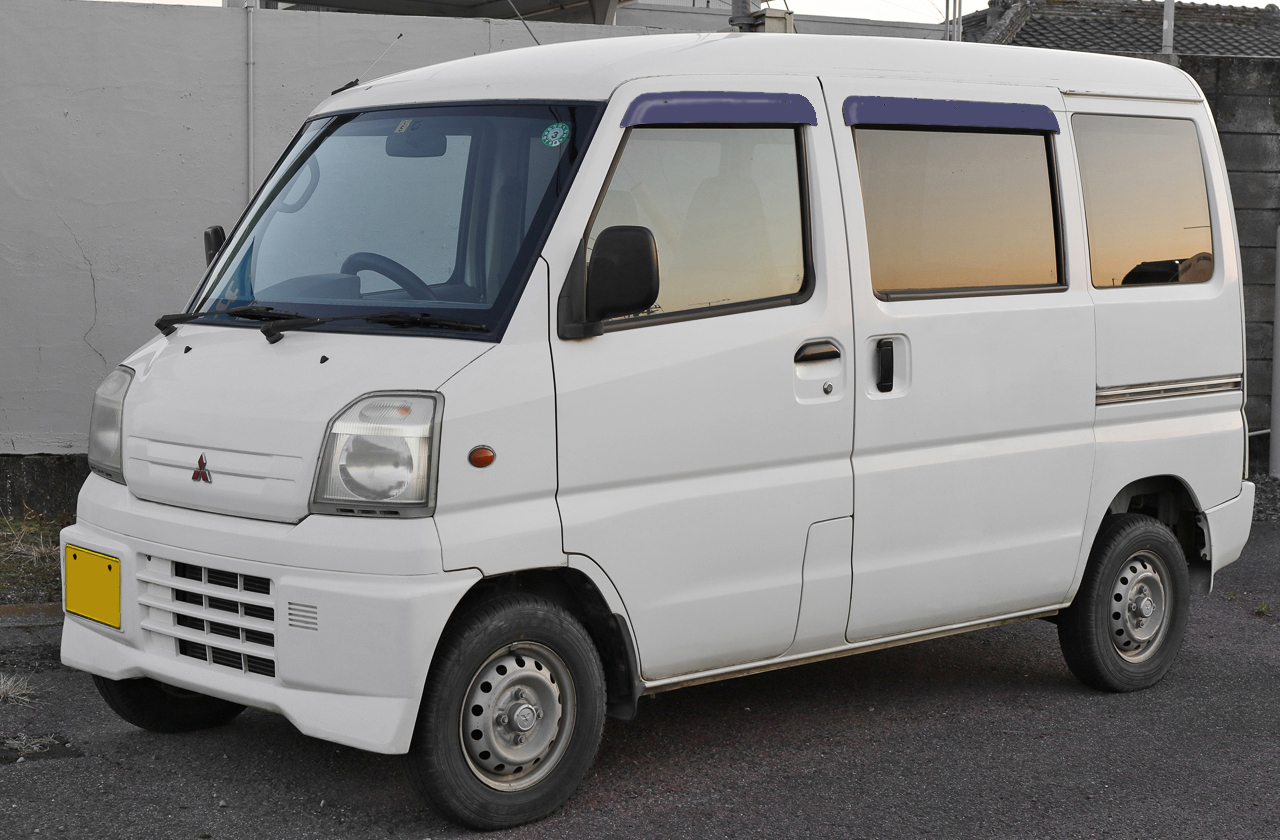
Sixth generation Minicab Van, pre-facelift

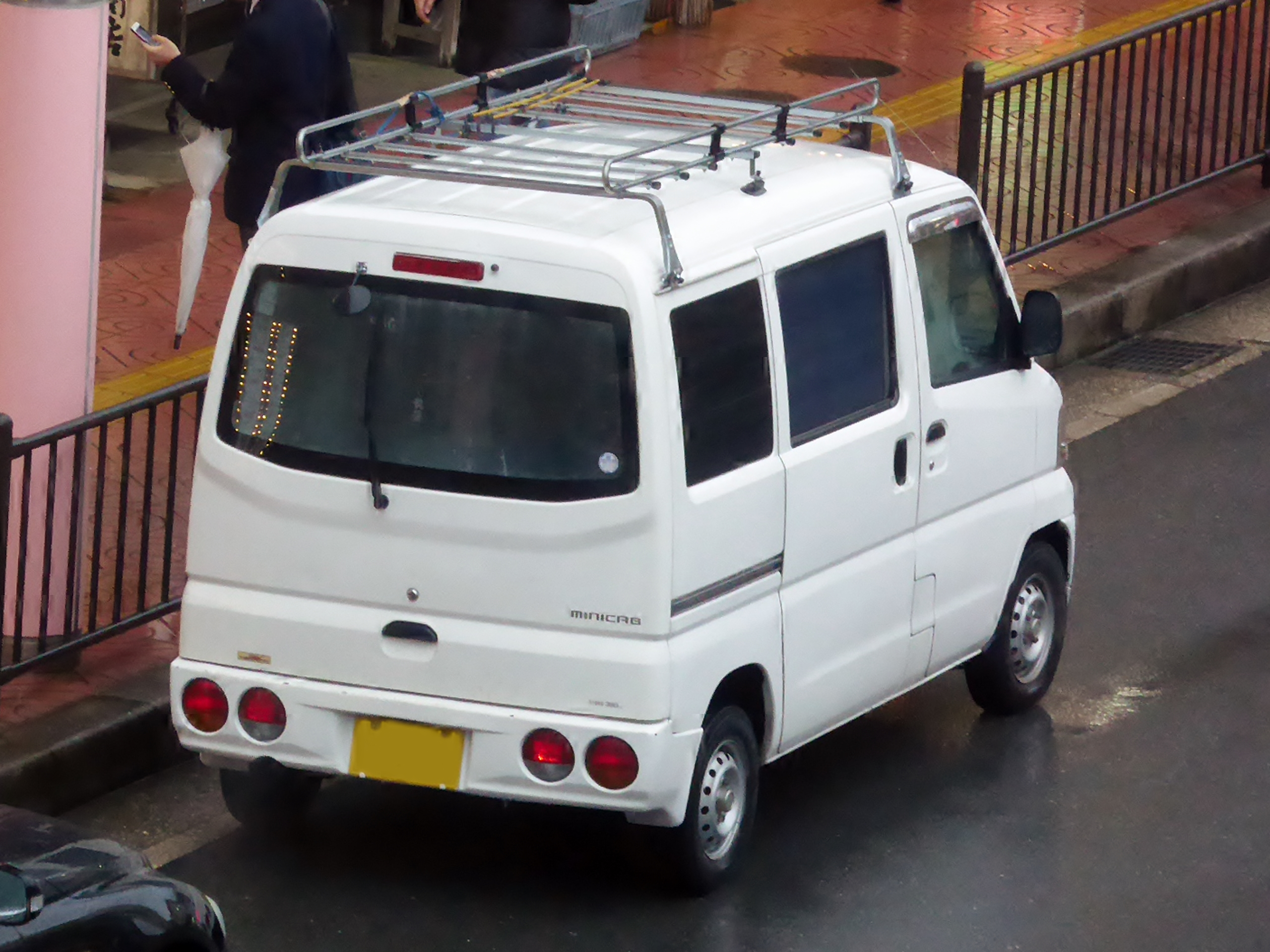
Rear view

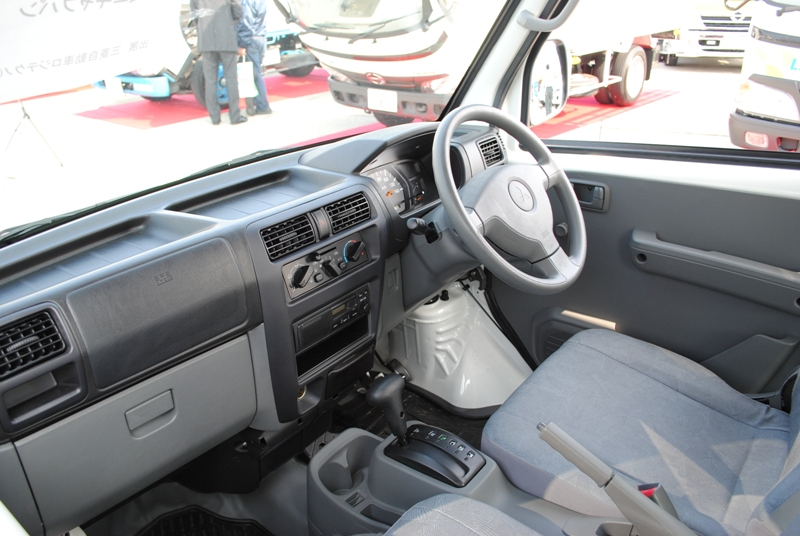
Interior (early)

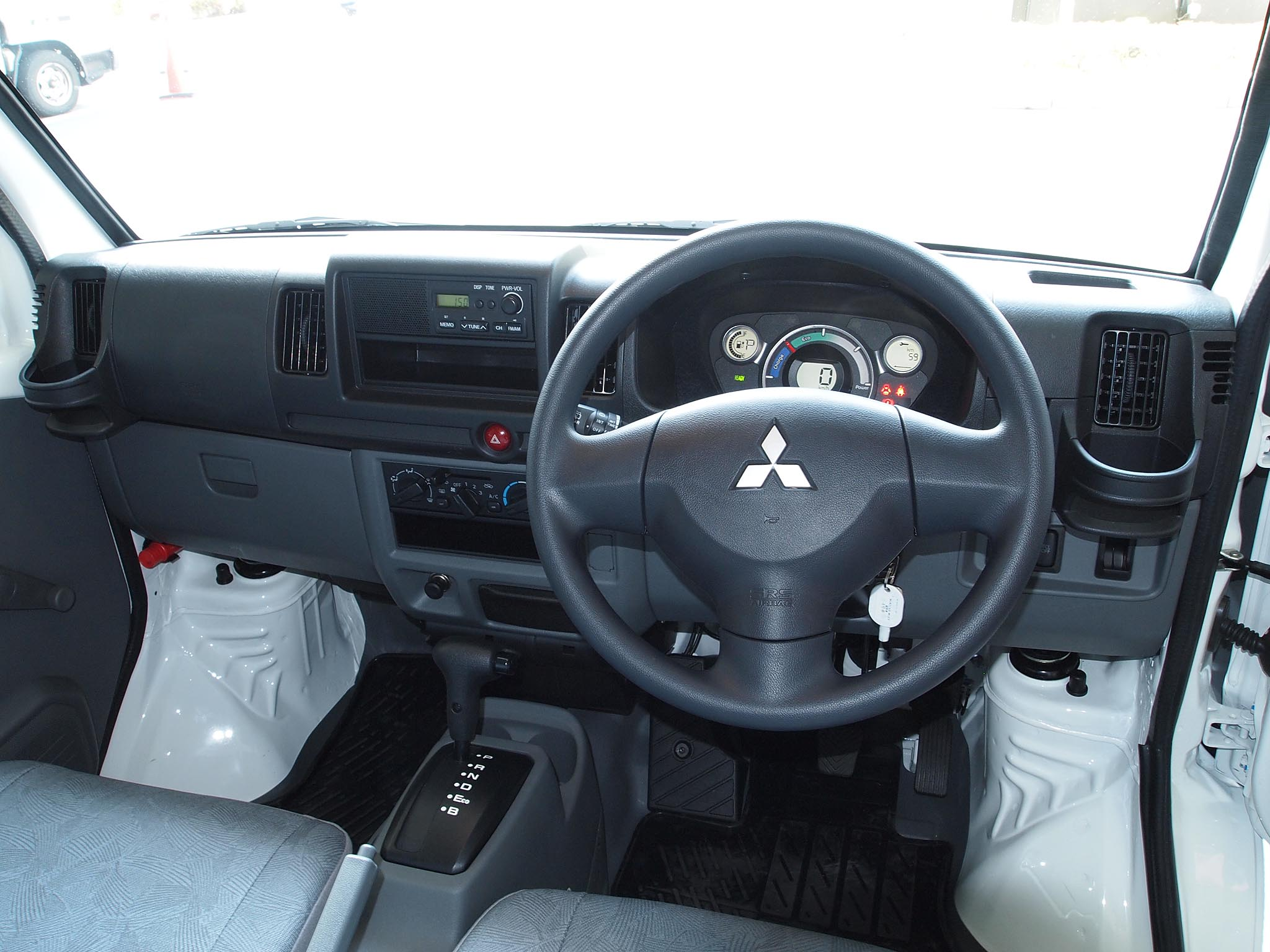
Interior (late; Minicab MiEV)

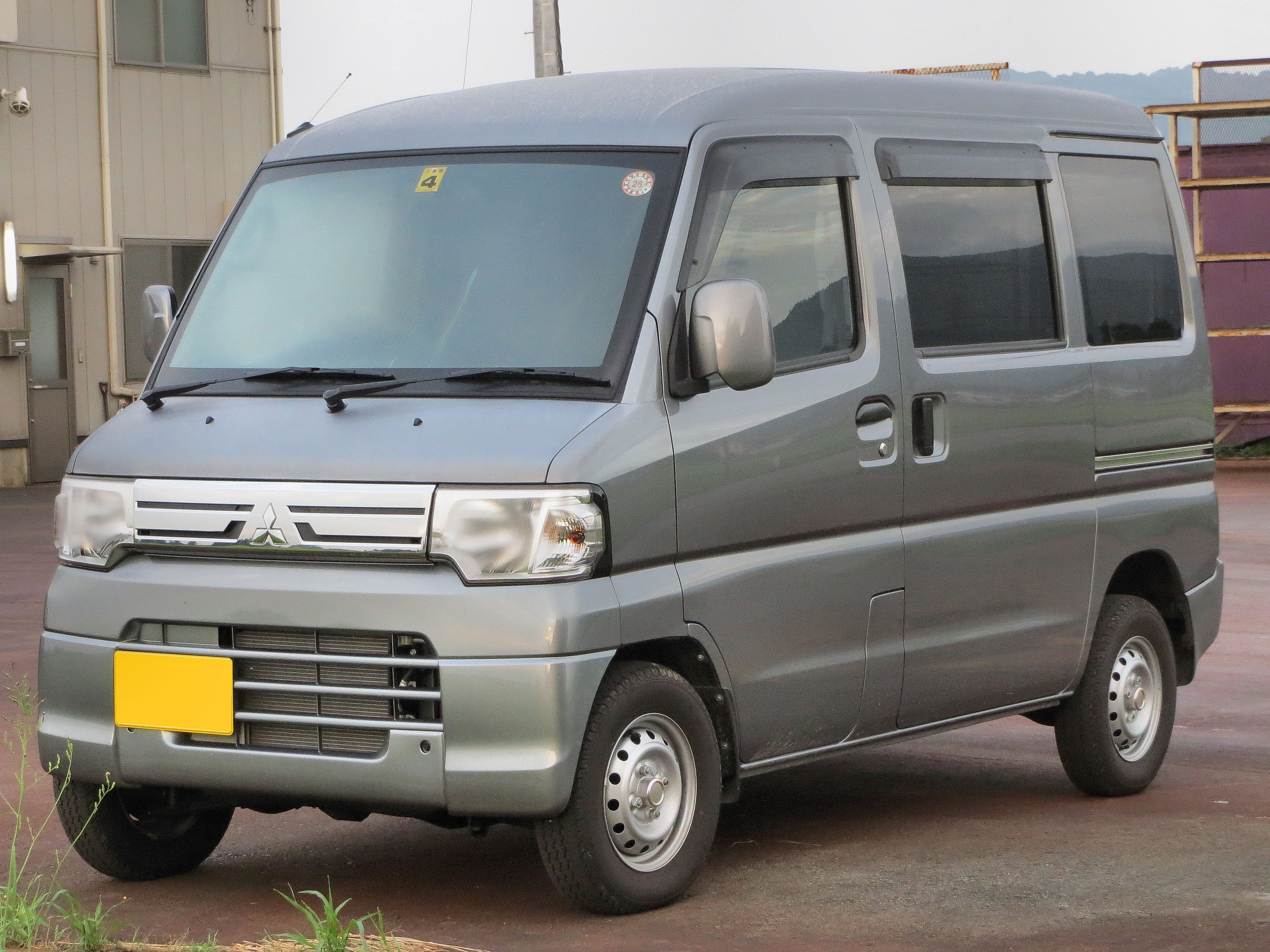
Mitsubishi Minicab CL van front view

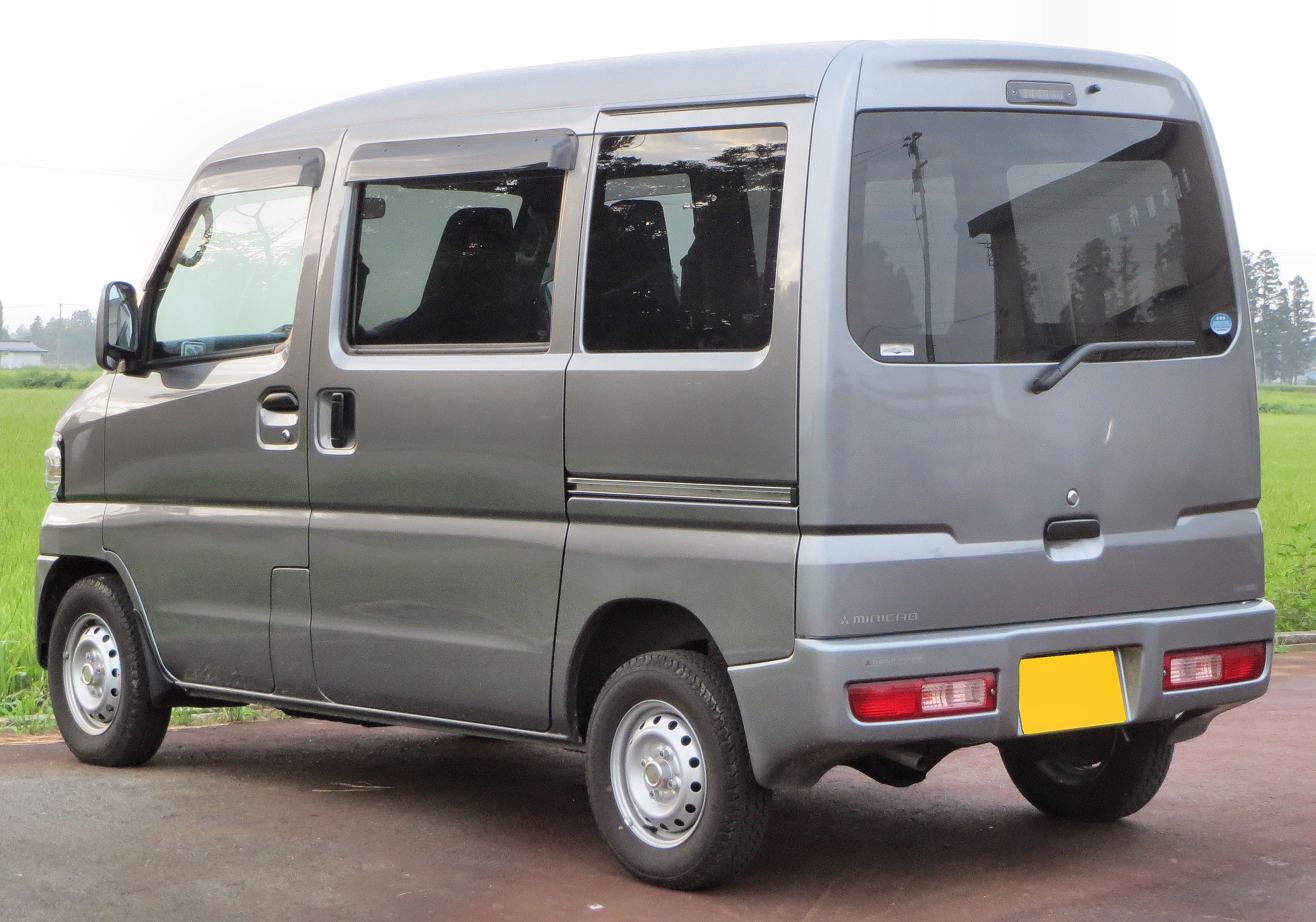
Mitsubishi Minicab CL rear view (facelift)

CMC Veryca

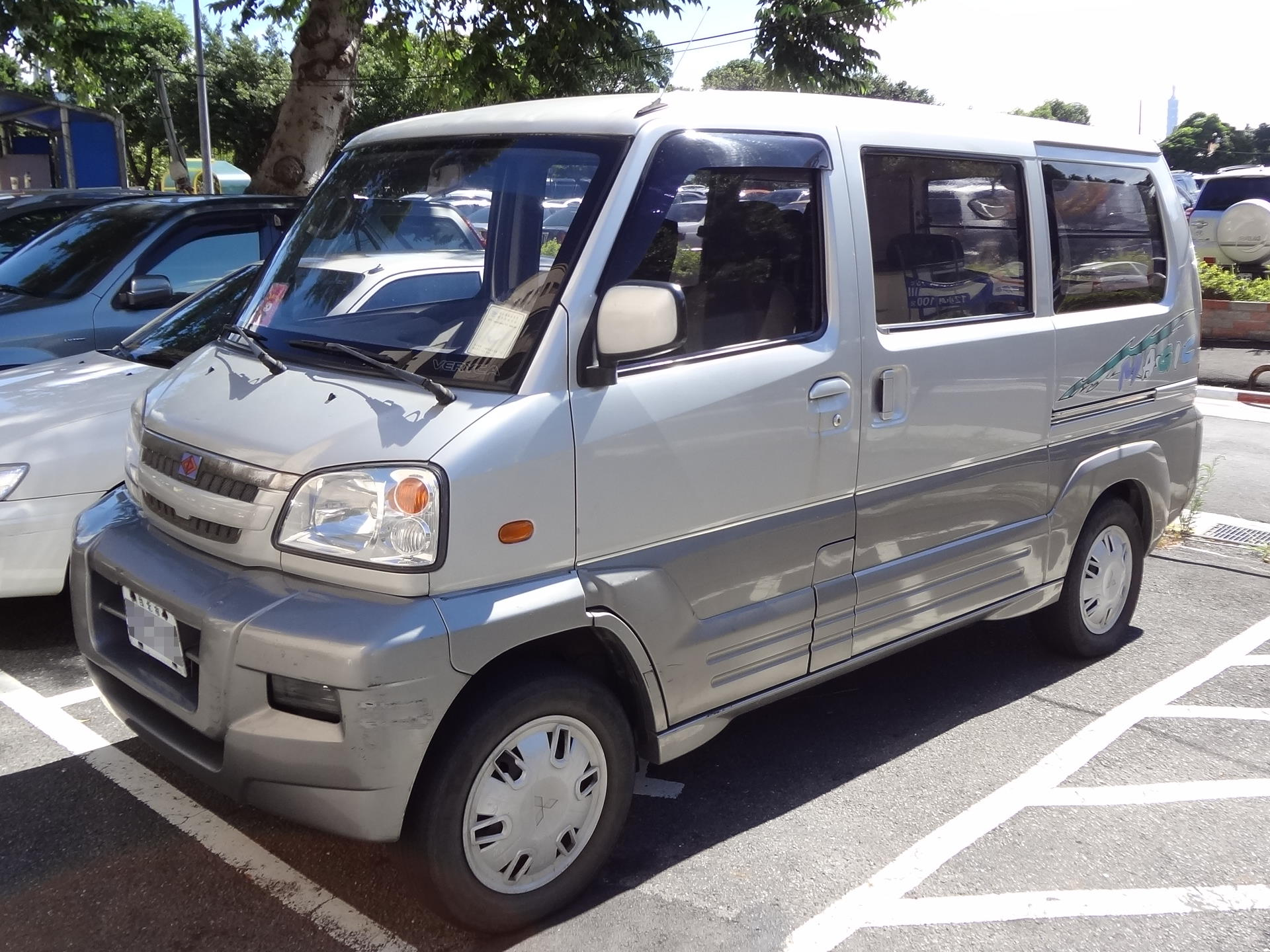
Fourth-generation CMC Veryca van pre-facelift front view

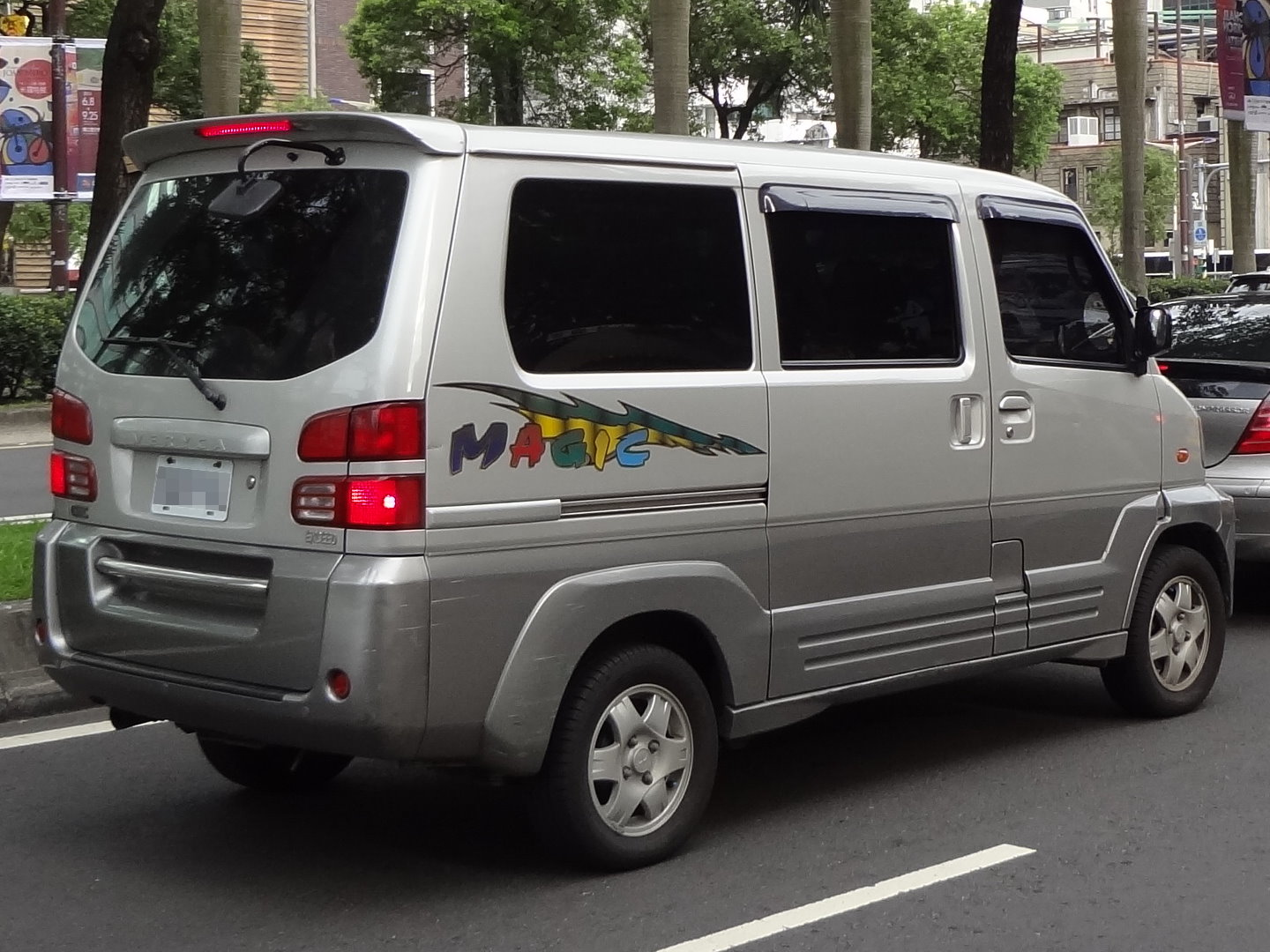
Fourth-generation CMC Veryca van pre-facelift rear view

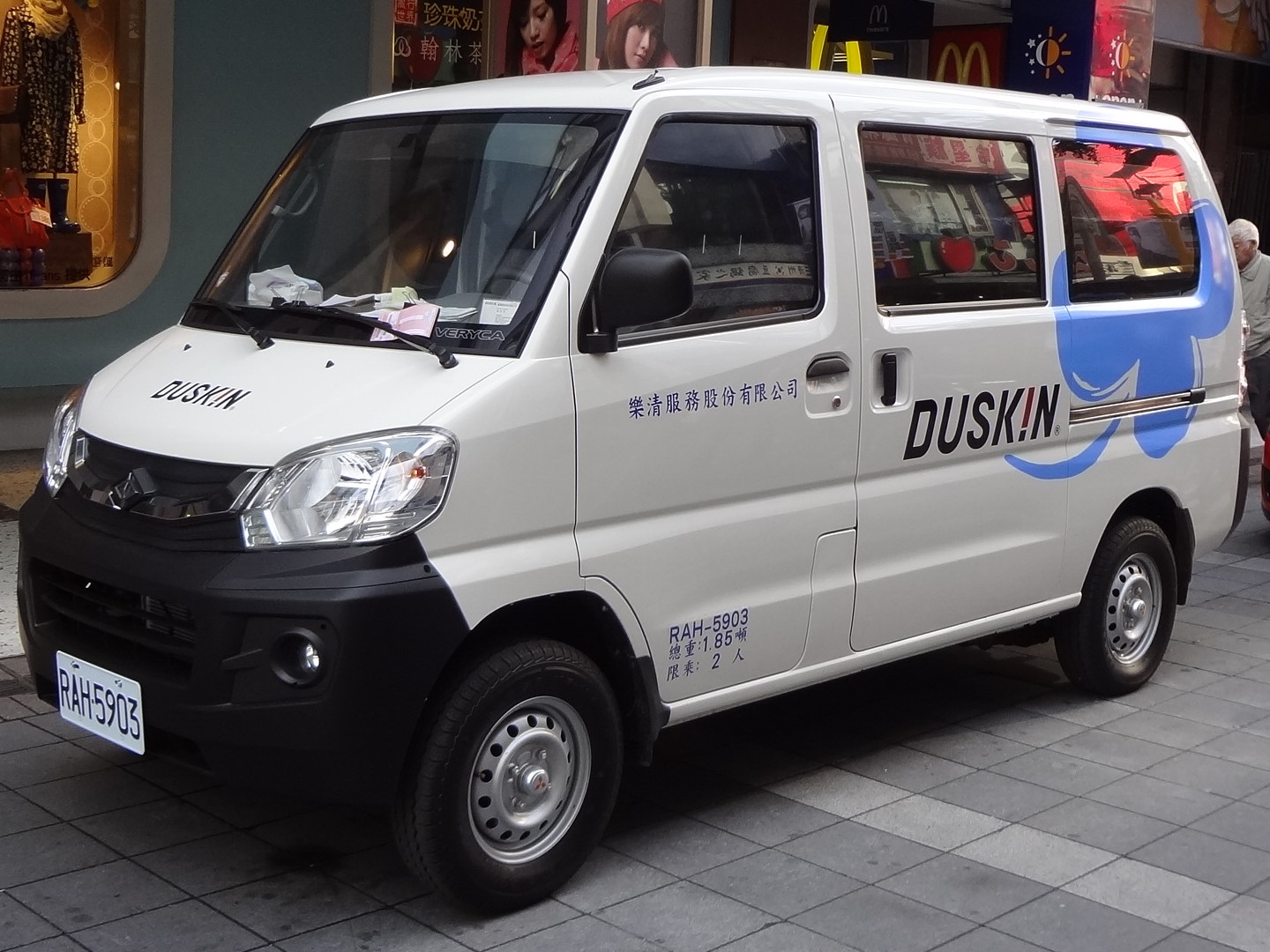
Fourth-generation CMC Veryca facelift van front view

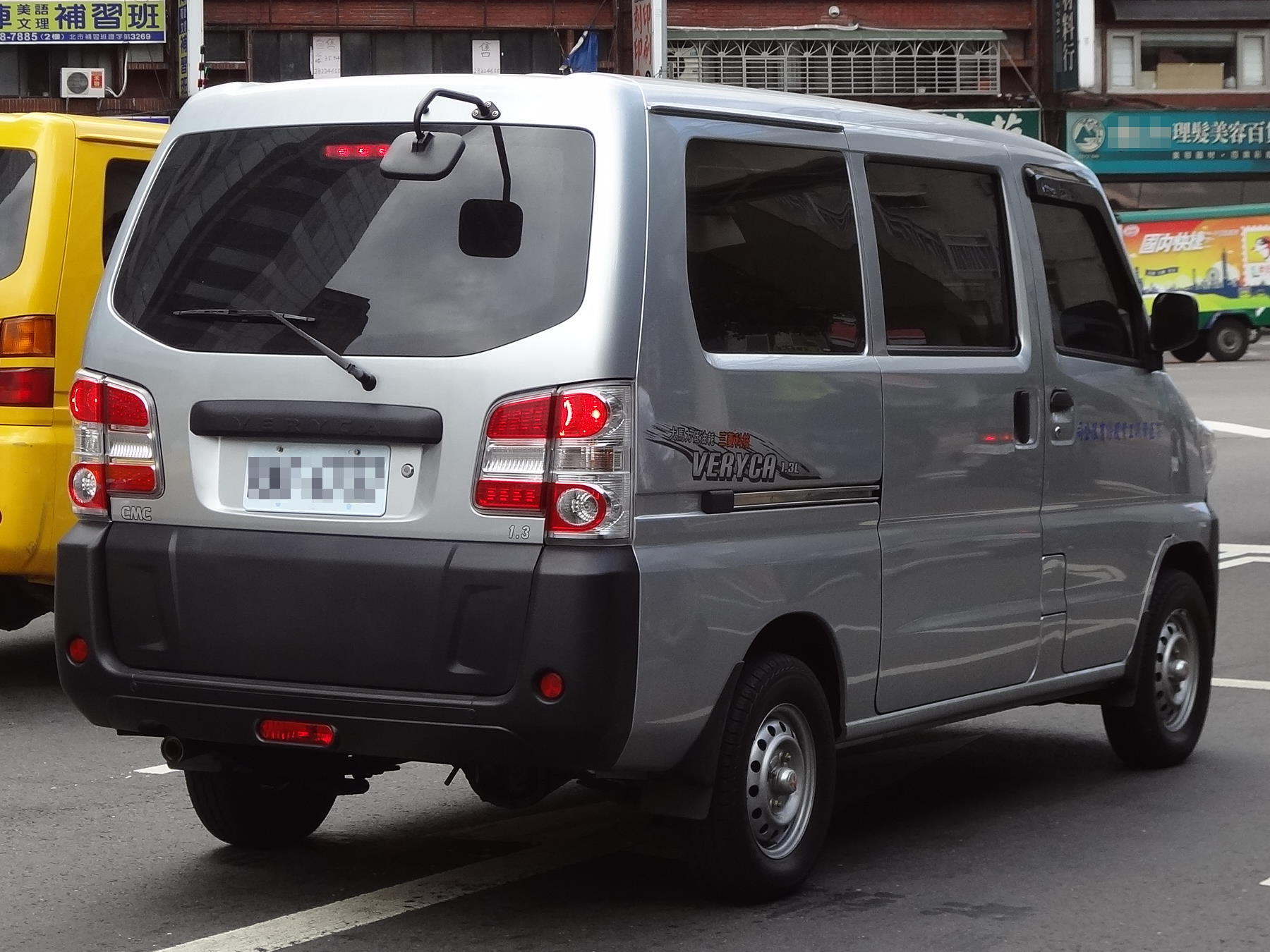
Fourth-generation CMC Veryca facelift van rear view

=== Minicab MiEV/EV ===
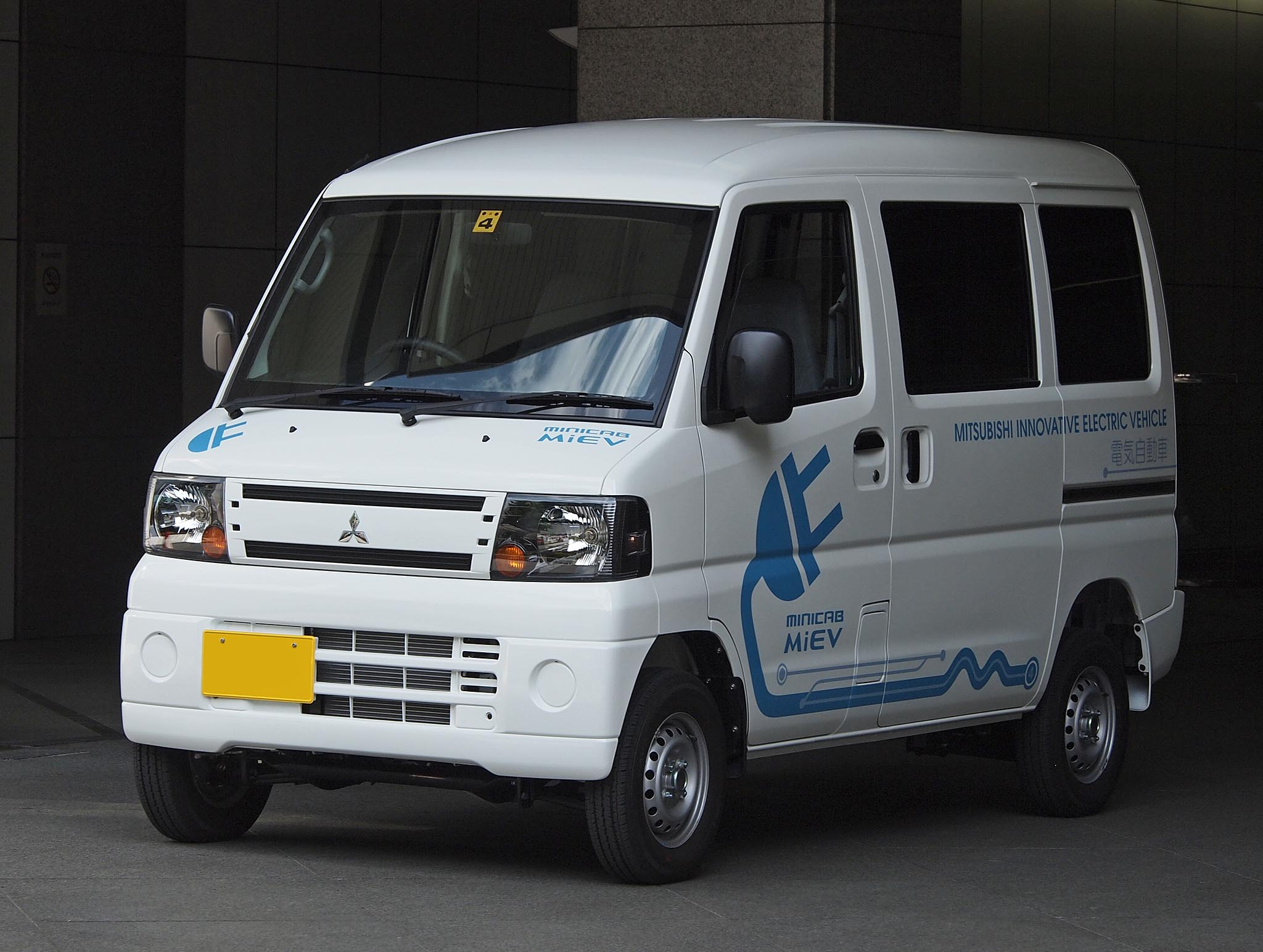
Prototype of the Mitsubishi Minicab MiEV all-electric van

Mitsubishi began testing of the Minicab MiEV in Japan in October 2010. In January 2011, Mitsubishi stated that it would add an electric version of Minicab, Minicab MiEV, for sale in Japan in the third quarter of 2011. A December 2011 launch was later planned.

The Y4F1 traction motor in the Minicab MiEV has a rated output of 30 kW (41 PS) at 2500–6000 rpm and 196 N⋅m (145 lb⋅ft) at 0–300 rpm. It is available with one of two traction storage battery options: 10.5 kW-hr (yielding a range of 100 km (62 mi) on the JC08 mode) and 16.0 kW-hr with an extended range of 150 km (93 mi). The curb weight is 1,090–1,110 kg (2,400–2,450 lb), depending on the battery selected. The drivetrain and key components were borrowed from the marque's i-MiEV kei car, with the motor retuned to improve low-end torque for commercial vehicle use; charging time ranged from 15 to 35 minutes (to 80% state of charge, using DC supply at 50 kW for the 10.5 kW-hr and 16.0 kW-hr battery options, respectively) to 14–21 hours (to full, using conventional AC wall supply at 100 V / 15 A). Payload capacity is approximately the same as the regular Minicab, at 350 kg (770 lb) with two occupants.

Mitsubishi picked up early orders for 100 units from major delivery company Yamato Transport in May of that year. The commercial-use electric vehicle is available with a lower range than that of the i-MiEV, in a bid to reduce costs. The price is aimed for less than ¥2,000,000 (about US$24,450) after subsidies. With government subsidies, the starting price was ¥1,730,000 and ¥2,020,000 for the 10.5 and 16.0 kW-hr versions, respectively; without, prices were ¥2,400,000 and ¥2,950,000, respectively. The Minicab MiEV was released in the domestic market in December 2011, and a total of 4,544 units have been sold in Japan through October 2013. A truck version of the Minicab MiEV was launched in January 2013, and sales totaled 536 units through October 2013. Sales of the MiEV Truck were ended in May 2017. In 2019, Japan Post ordered a total of 1,200 units, to be put into service by the end of March 2021.

While the Mitsubishi MiEV was discontinued, the Minicab MiEV remains in production on the old Minicab platform in Mitsubishi's Mizushima plant. In February 2023, Mitsubishi announced plans to produce the model in Indonesia. Mitsubishi Motors Krama Yudha Indonesia began selling the Mitsubishi Minicab MiEV as Mitsubishi L100 EV since 16 February 2024. Now called the Minicab EV ("MiEV" was deemed confusing), it was revived in Japan in December 2023, along with its Nissan-badged Clipper EV sibling. The model code was also changed, from ZAB-U68V to ZAB-U69V, to reflect the update in capacity to a 20.0 kW-hr battery. Maximum power is 31 kW (42 PS), torque 196 N⋅m (145 lb⋅ft), and range is 180 km (112 mi).

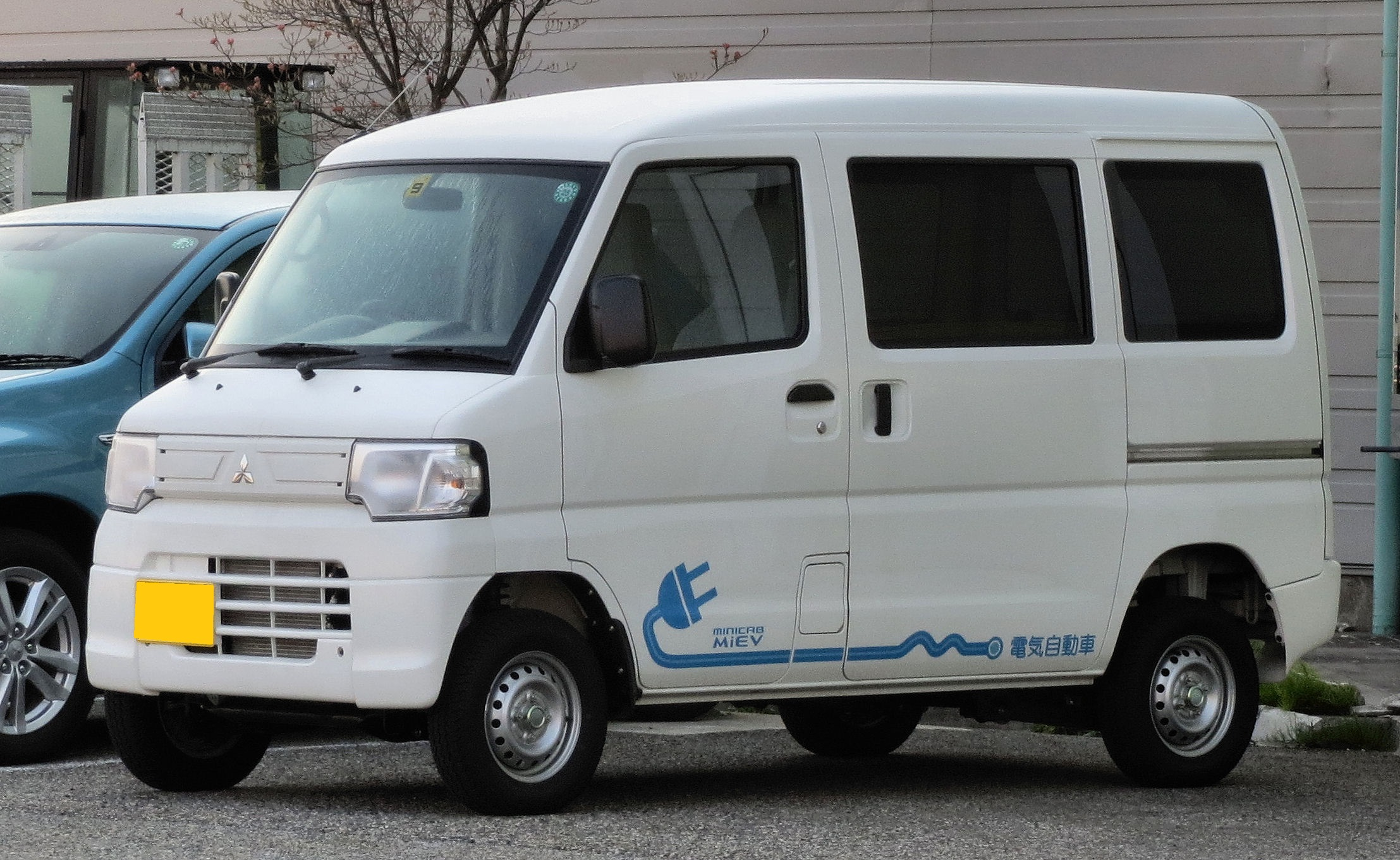
Mitsubishi Minicab MiEV Van

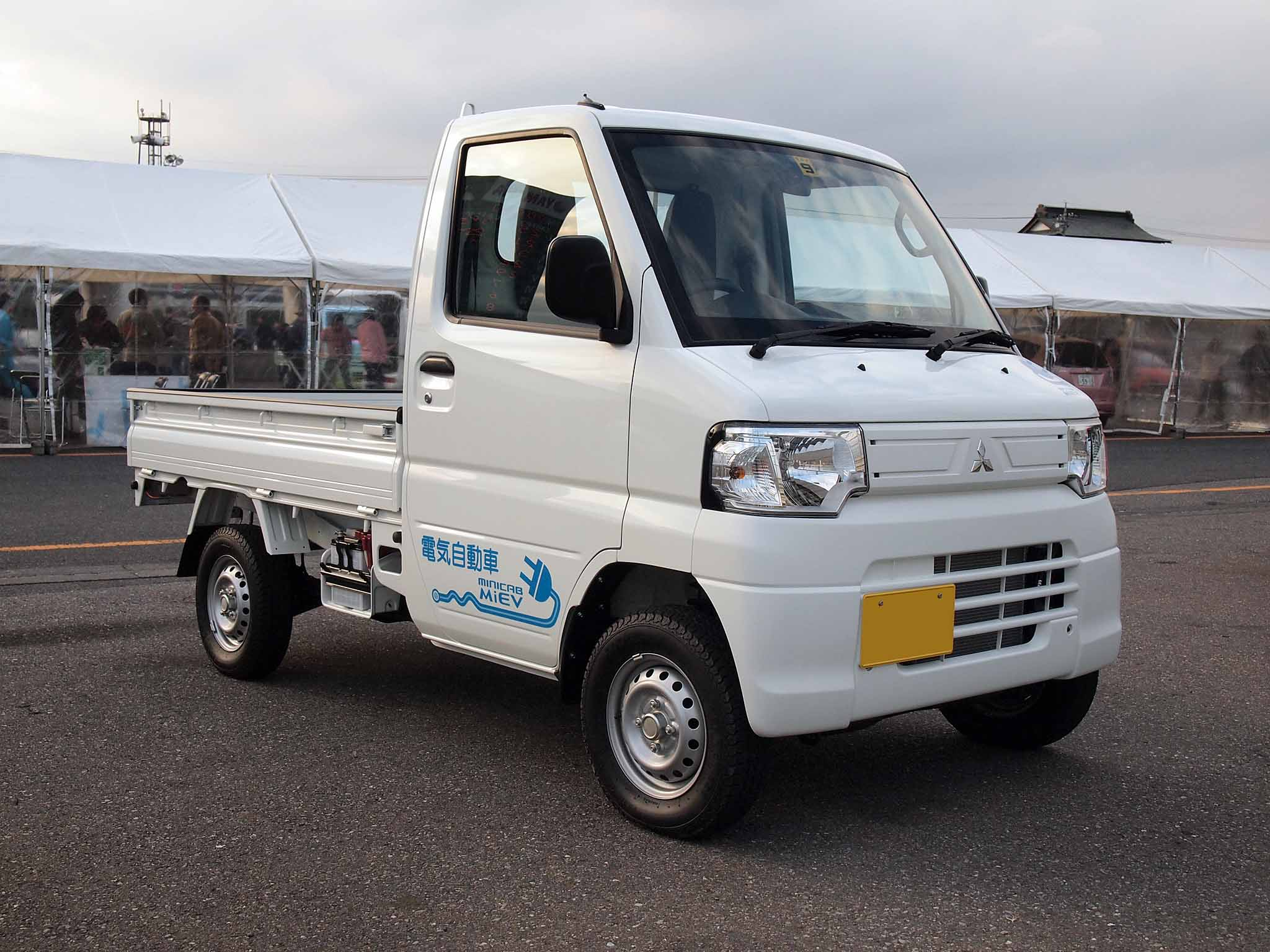
Mitsubishi Minicab MiEV (truck prototype)

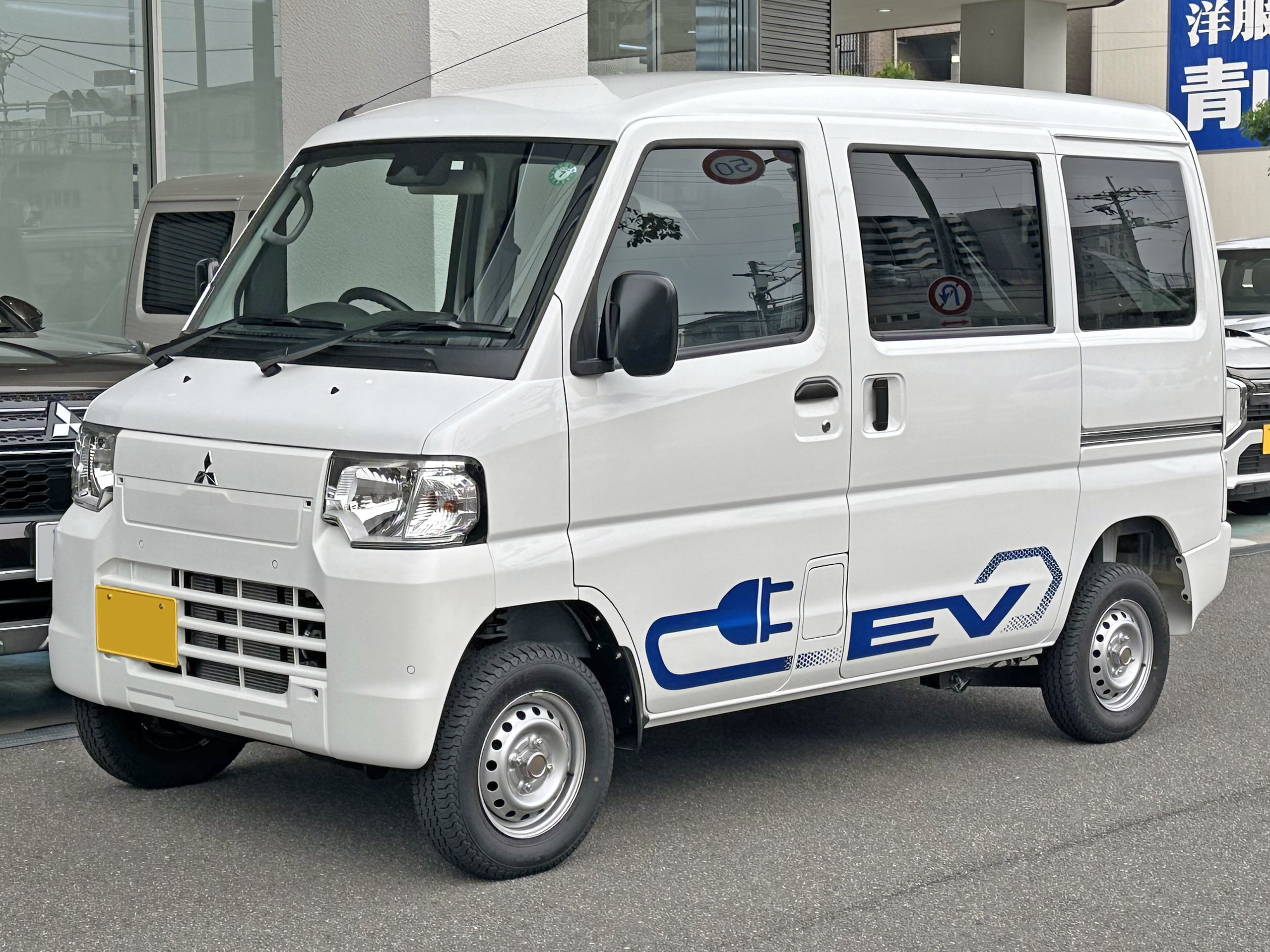
2024 Mitsubishi Minicab EV (CD 4-seater)

=== Nissan Clipper ===
Mitsubishi also manufactured a badge-engineered version of the Minicab pickup on behalf of Nissan, which sold it as the Nissan Clipper (a badge originally used on a larger range of Prince and Nissan trucks). The trucks were called NT100 Clippers, and vans were NV100s. The Minicab/Clipper competed in the Japanese market with the Honda Acty, Subaru Sambar, Daihatsu Hijet, and Suzuki Carry. The Minicab and Clipper were both facelifted in July 2012, to meet new safety regulations. Following Mitsubishi's announcement that they would stop manufacturing their own kei trucks for 2014, Nissan stopped selling the rebadged Minicab in November 2013. Since then, both Mitsubishi and Nissan rely on the Suzuki Carry/Every range for their entry in the keitora class. In 2024, the badge-engineered version of the Minicab was revived as the electric vehicle version of the Clipper Minivan.

== Seventh generation ==
The seventh-generation Mitsubishi Minicab is a rebadged Suzuki Carry or Every; it was introduced in 27 February 2014. The vans (DS64V) were available for only one year, as the Every on which they were based was just about to be replaced. Mitsubishi also offered the more passenger-oriented Suzuki Every Wagon (same chassis code), differing mostly in terms of equipment and engines, but with a redesigned rear, reviving the Mitsubishi Town Box badge, which had lain dormant for a few years. The truck range (chassis code DS16T) remains in production as a result of Suzuki deciding to let the two model lines diverge.

A facelift was occurred in February 2026.

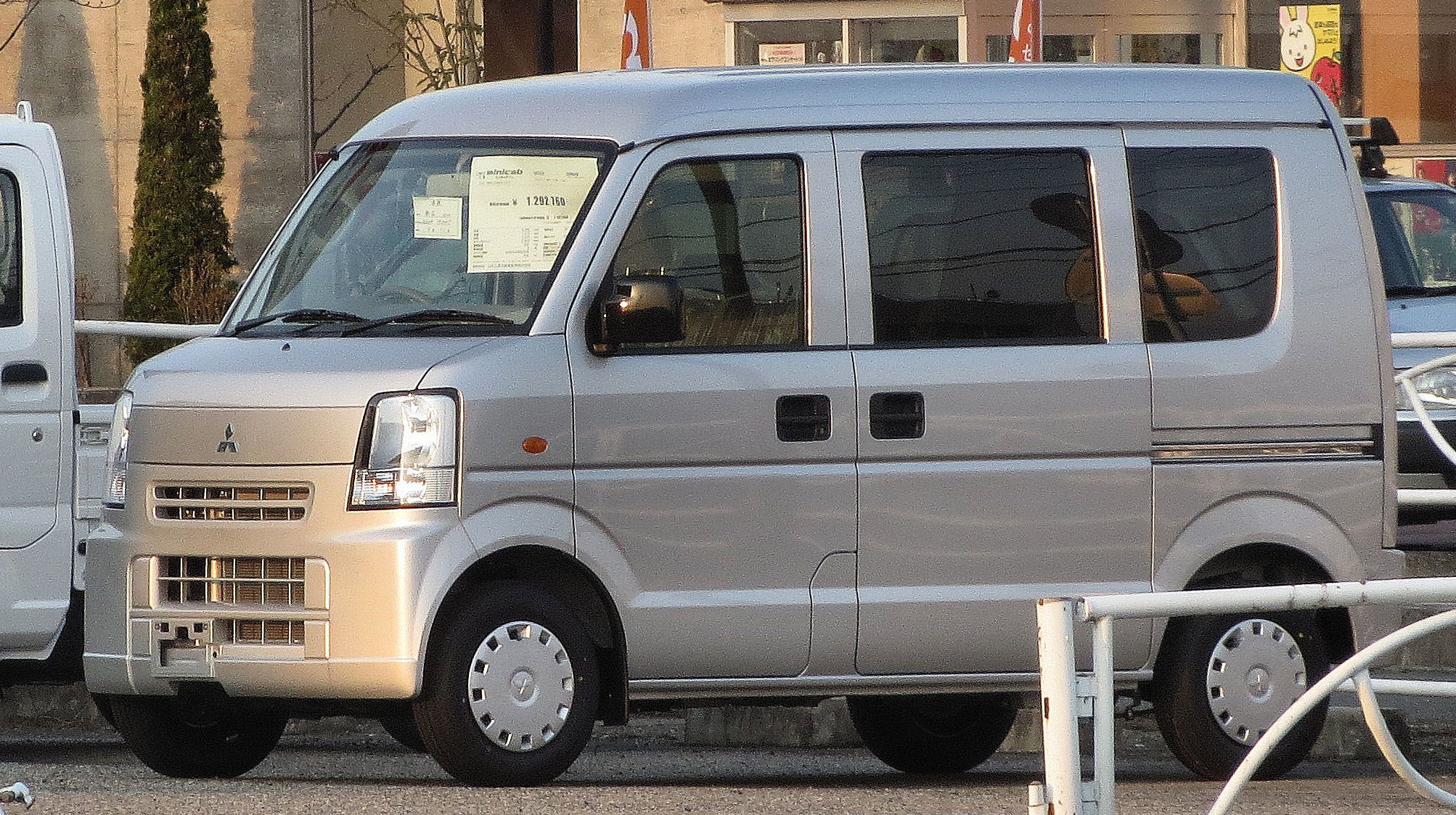
Seventh-generation Mitsubishi Minicab Van Bravo 4WD (2014)

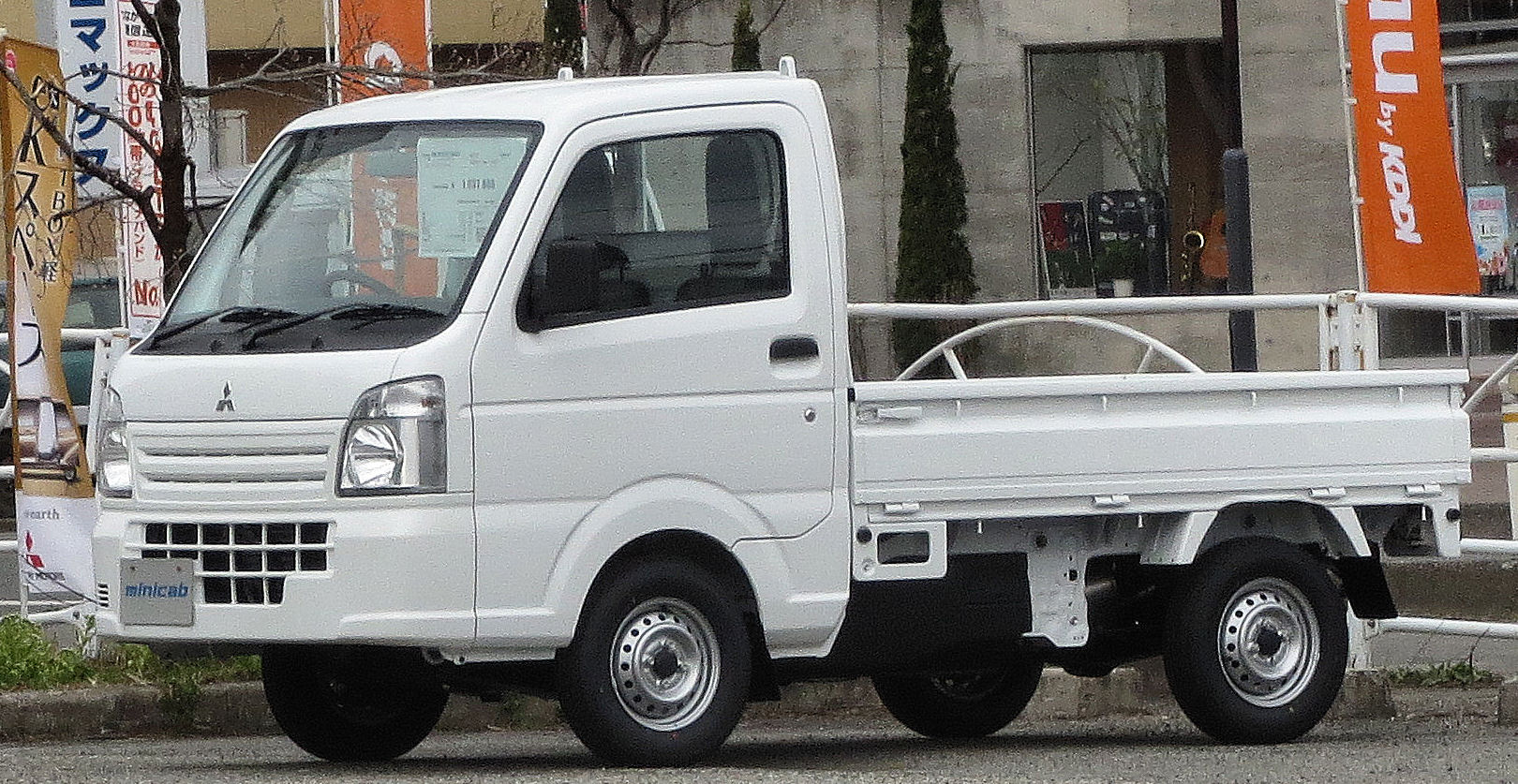
Mitsubishi Minicab Truck M 4WD (2014–2026)

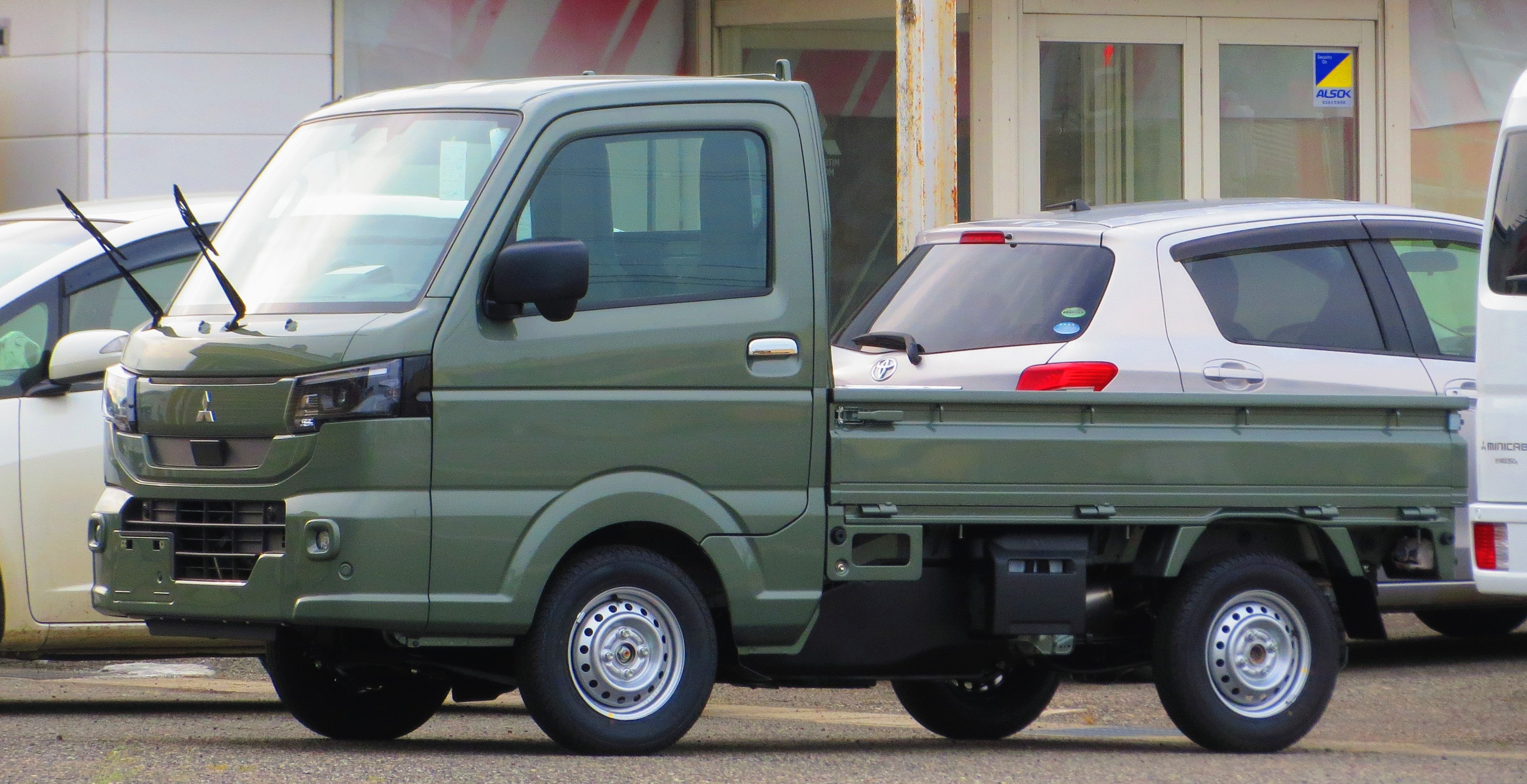
Facelift

== Eighth generation ==
The eighth-generation Mitsubishi Minicab (DS17V, van only) was introduced in March 2015, and is also a rebadged Suzuki Every. The Every Wagon-based Town Box was changed simultaneously.

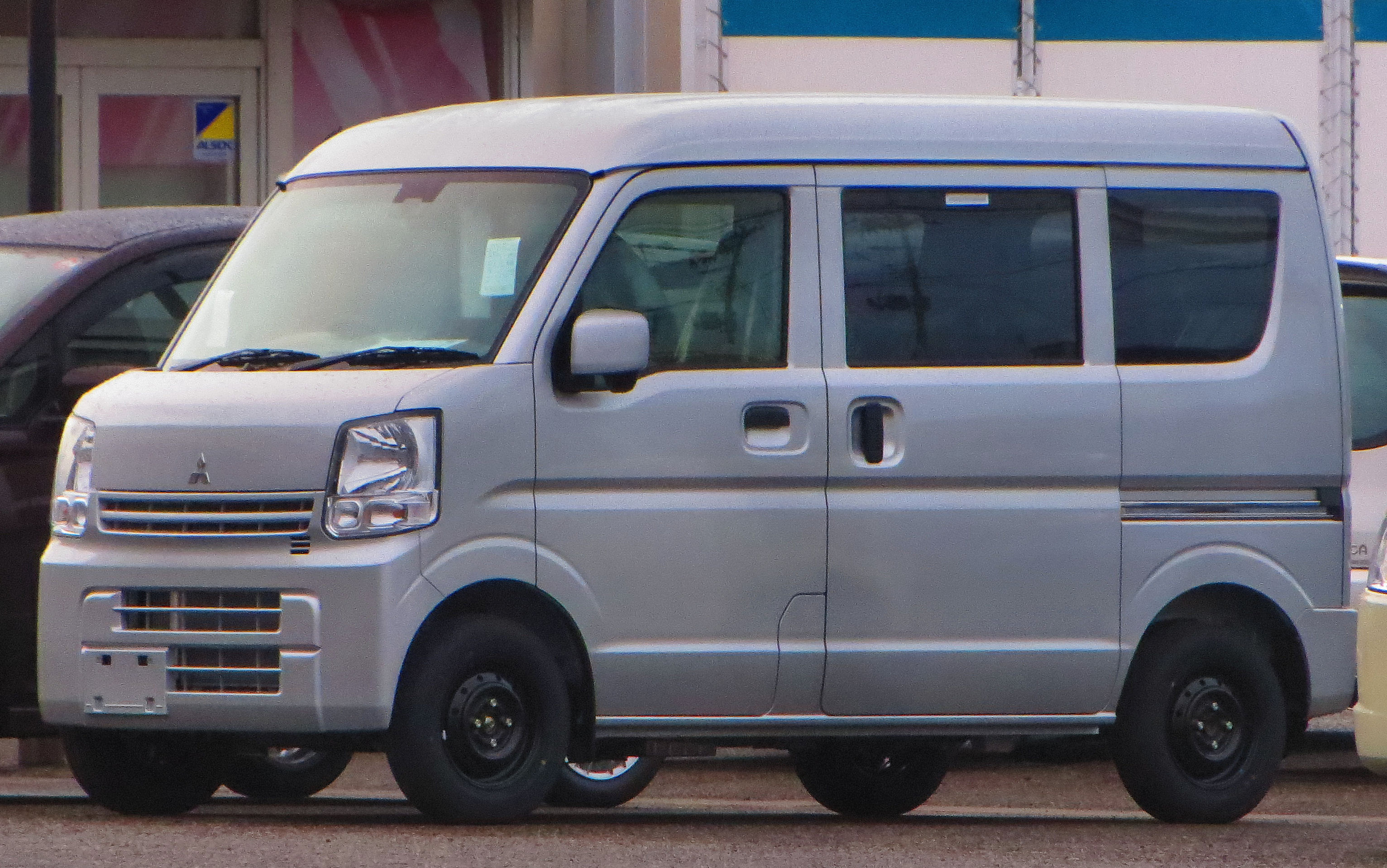
Mitsubishi Minicab Van Bravo Turbo 4WD

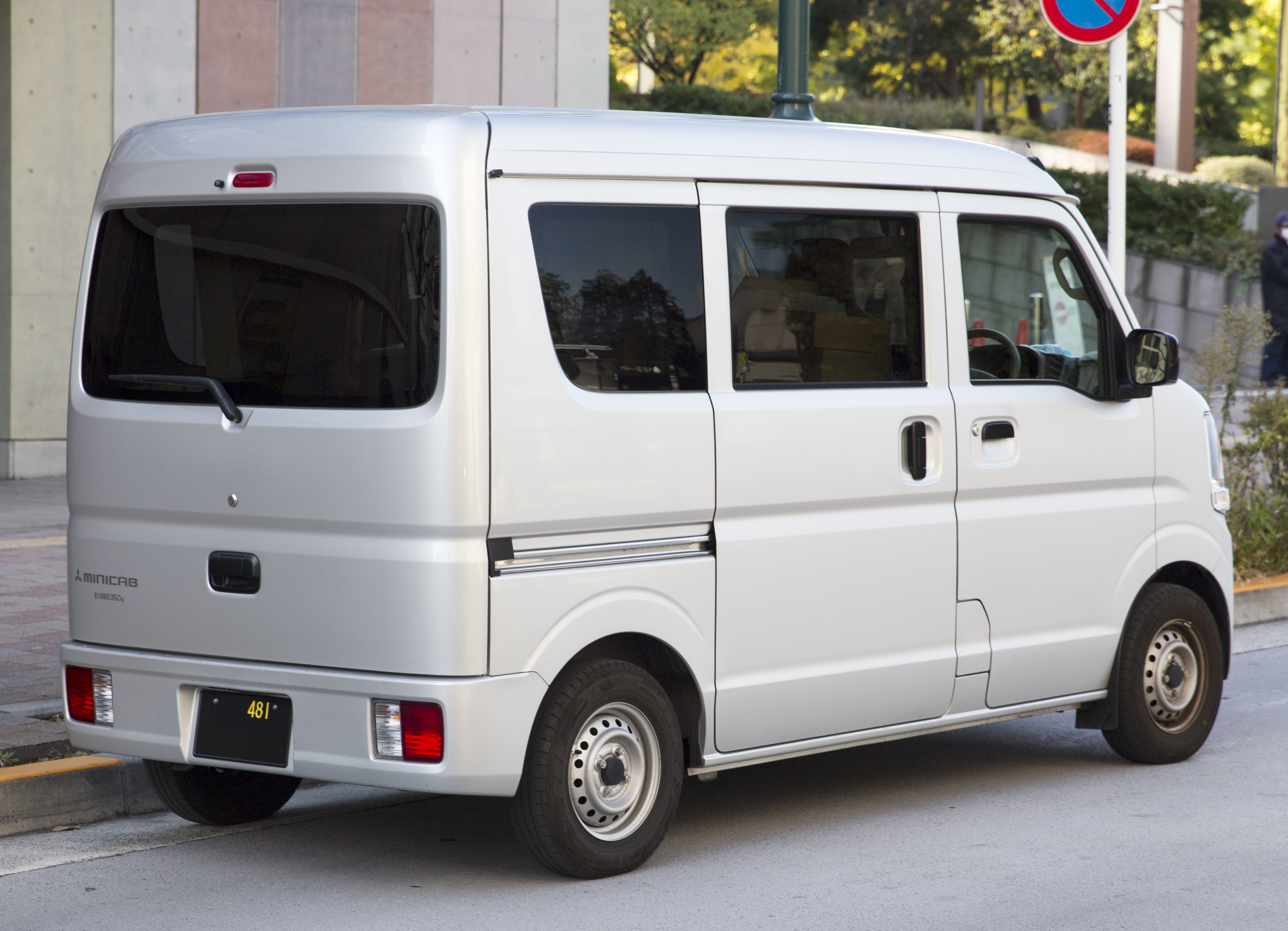
Rear view
