= Mitsubishi Minica =

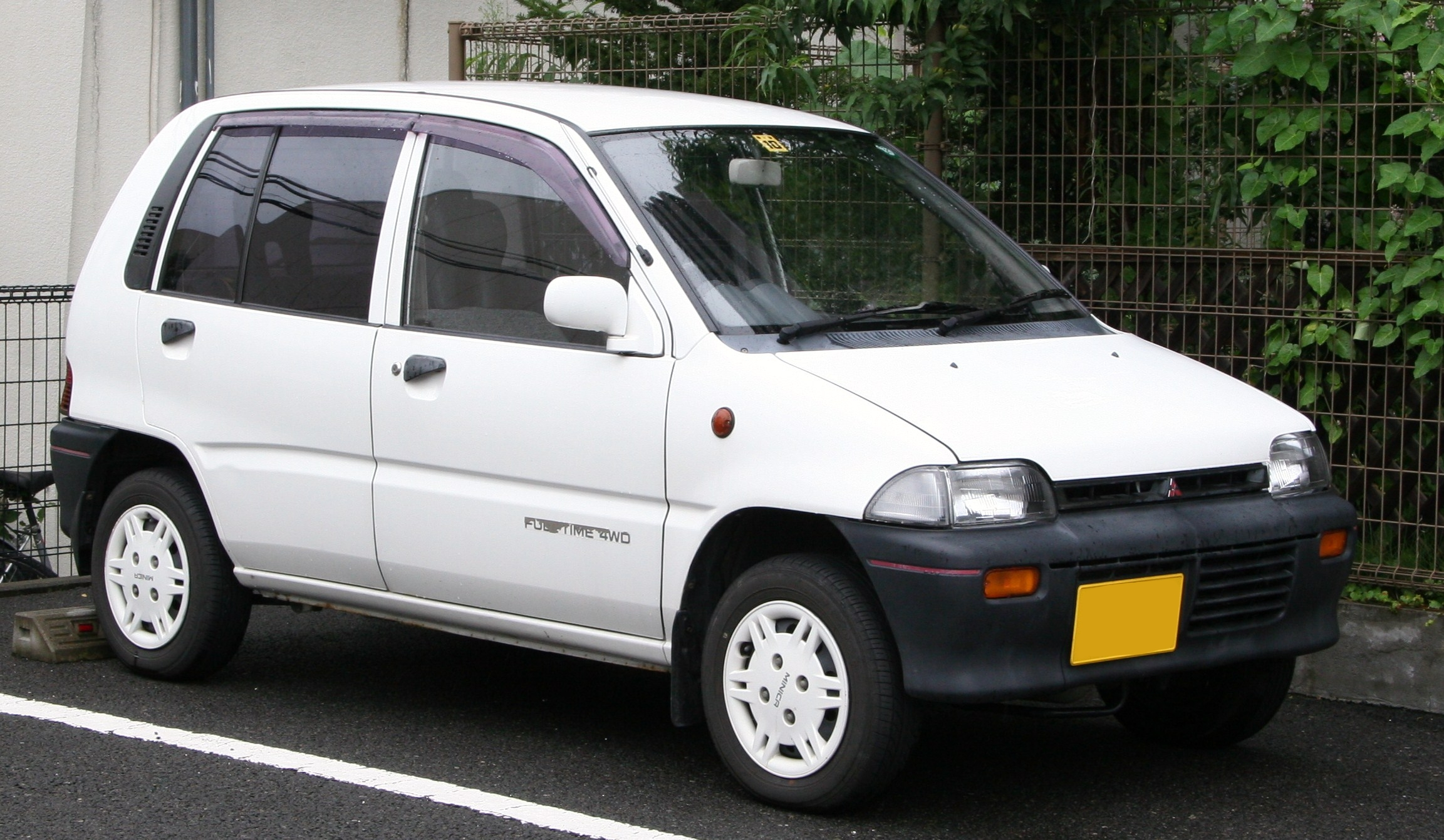
- Sixth generation Minica

Overview
- Manufacturer: Shin Mitsubishi Heavy-Industries (1962–1964); Mitsubishi Motors (1964–2011)
- Also called: Mitsubishi 360; Mitsubishi Towny
- Production: 1962–2011
- Assembly: Mizushima plant, Kurashiki, Okayama, Japan; Cainta, Rizal, Philippines (1974–1988)

Body and chassis
- Class: Kei car
- Related: Mitsubishi Minicab

Chronology
- Successor: Mitsubishi eK; Mitsubishi i

The Mitsubishi Minica (Japanese: 三菱・ミニカ, Hepburn: Mitsubishi Minika) is a model series of kei cars, produced by Mitsubishi Motors Corp. (MMC) over five generations, from 1962 to 2011, mainly for the Japanese domestic market.

The Minica was first built by Shin Mitsubishi Heavy-Industries, one of Mitsubishi Heavy Industries' three regional automotive companies, until they were merged in 1964. As such, the badge predates M.M.C. itself. In Japan, it was sold at a specific retail chain called Galant Shop.

The Minica range was replaced by the Mitsubishi eK and the Mitsubishi i in 2007 and 2011, respectively.

== First generation ==
=== Mitsubishi 360 ===
Mitsubishi 360 (commercials)
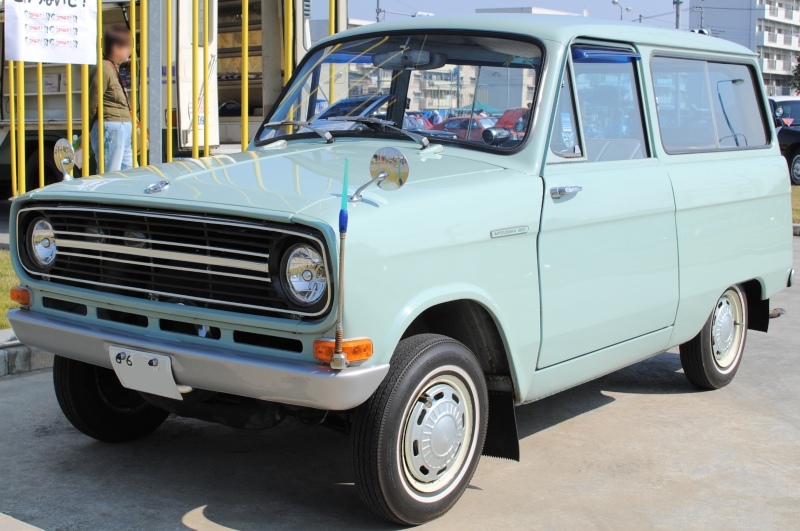
- 1968–1969 Mitsubishi 360 Light Van

Overview
- Also called: Mitsubishi Minica Pick
- Production: April 1961 – July 1969 (Light Van); October 1961 – September 1972 (pickup)

Body and chassis
- Body style: 2-door, 2-seater van (LT20); 2-door light van (LT21/23); 2-seat pickup truck (LT22/25)
- Layout: Front-engine, rear-wheel-drive

Powertrain
- Engine: 359 cc ME21/ME24 air-cooled two-stroke I2
- Power output: ME21: 17 PS at 4800 rpm; ME24: 18 PS at 4800 rpm; ME24D: 21 PS at 5500 rpm; ME24E: 26 PS at 5500 rpm

Dimensions
- Wheelbase: 1,900 mm (74.8 in)
- Length: 2,995 mm (117.9 in)
- Width: 1,295 mm (51.0 in)
- Height: 1,390–1,400 mm (54.7–55.1 in)
- Curb weight: 480–525 kg (1,058–1,157 lb)

The precursor of the Minica was the Mitsubishi 360, a series of light trucks introduced in April 1961. Designed for the lowest kei car vehicle tax classification, it was powered by an air-cooled 359 cc, 17 PS (13 kW) engine, providing a lowly 80 km/h (50 mph) top speed but with a fully syncromeshed four-speed transmission. After the successful 1962 introduction of the passenger car version, called Minica, the 360 van and pickup continued alongside the Minica, sharing its development. The Mitsubishi 360/Minica competed with the established Subaru 360, Daihatsu Fellow Max, and the Suzuki Fronte in the late sixties. The somewhat unexpected success of the 360/Minica led Mitsubishi to end production of three-wheeled vehicles.

Originally available as a panel van or light van (really a Station Wagon, but registered as a commercial vehicle for tax purposes), with a pickup version added in October, the Mitsubishi 360 was rather quaintly styled. Suicide doors and a swage line which continued across the hood were often accented by whitewall tires and lace curtains (both standard on the Light Van DeLuxe, introduced in April 1962) to complete the picture. The 360 and Minica were given a thorough facelift in November 1964, with an entirely new front clip with a pressed metal chrome grille. The more modern look was accompanied by the new, somewhat more powerful ME24 engine, affording a top speed of 85 km/h (53 mph).

The four-seat version of the light van (LT21-4) could carry 200 kg (440 lb), while the strict two-seater (LT20) could take a full 300 kg (660 lb). The Pickup was rated for carrying 350 kg (770 lb).

In August 1966, the Mitsubishi Minicab cab-over pickup truck was launched to complement the Mitsubishi 360 light truck. Powered by the same air-cooled two-stroke 359 cc engine as the Minica, it came with cargo gates on three sides to simplify loading and unloading. In December, the 360 received a less ornate grille. In May 1967, the 360 and Minica were both updated with the new 21 PS ME24D, increasing top speed to 90 km/h (56 mph). In September 1968 a Super Deluxe version of the light van was added, featuring a new plastic grille and more modern interior. At the same time, the pickup dropped the "360" model name and was from now on sold as the "Minica Pick" (ミニカピック, Minika Pikku). By 1969, the new Minica Van had superseded the LT23 and it was no longer produced, although the LT25 pickup continued to be built until September 1972. These late models have the air-cooled ME24E engine with 26 PS (19 kW), although the claimed top speed remained 90 km/h (56 mph). It also has the same blacked-out plastic grille as fitted to the Super Deluxe and late first-generation Minicas.

Mitsubishi 360 Pickup

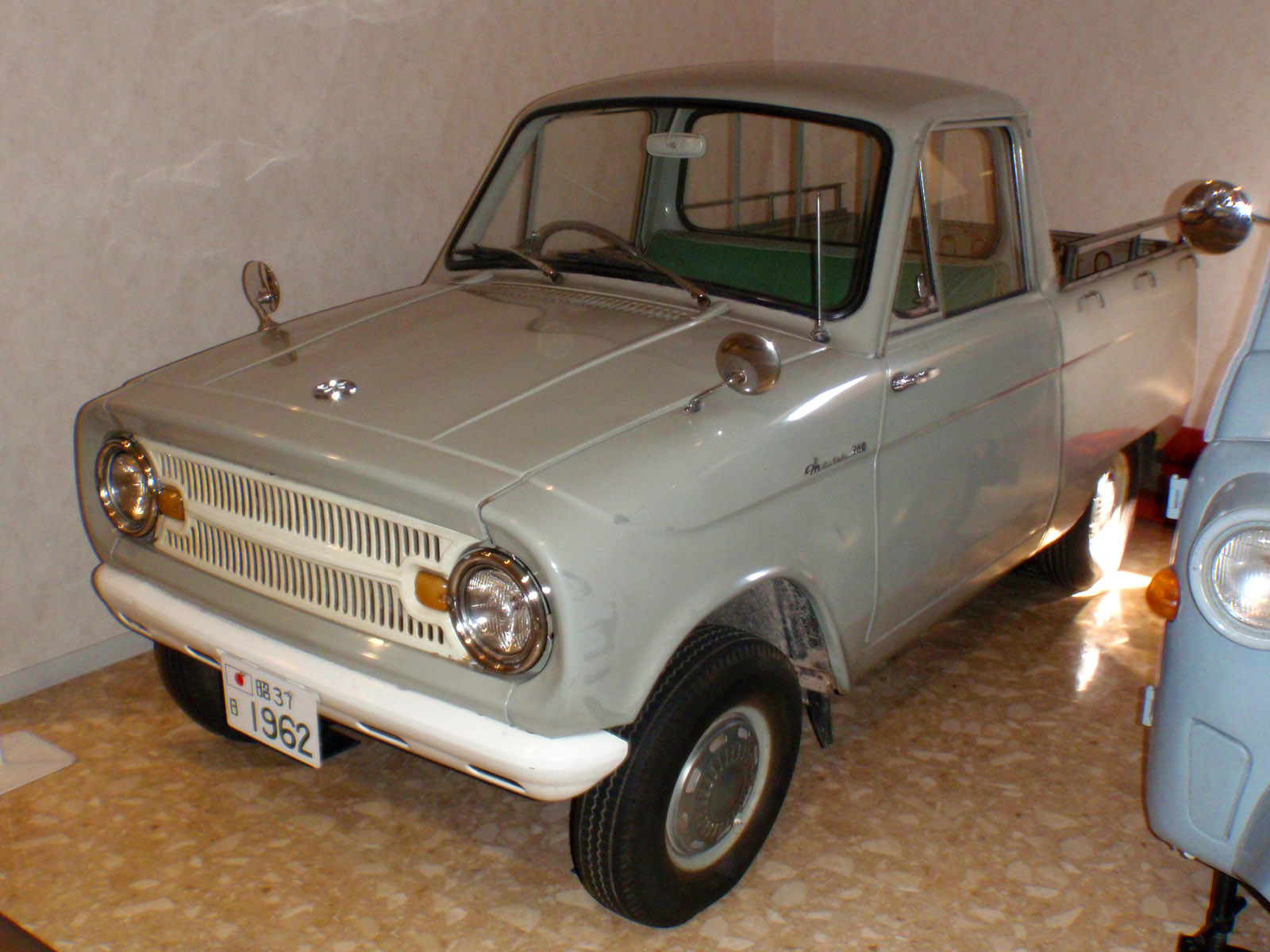
1961–1964 LT22

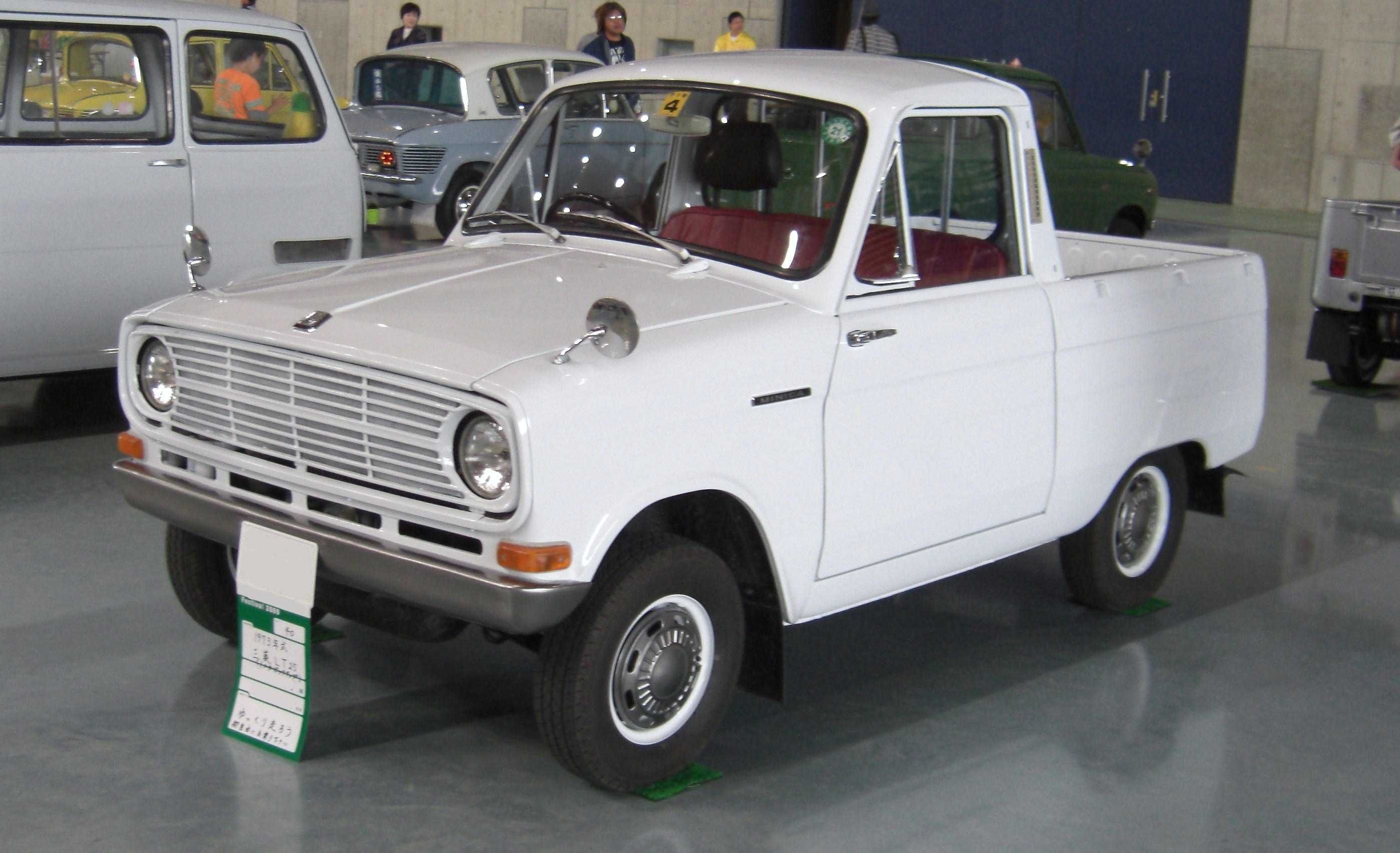
1967–1969 LT25

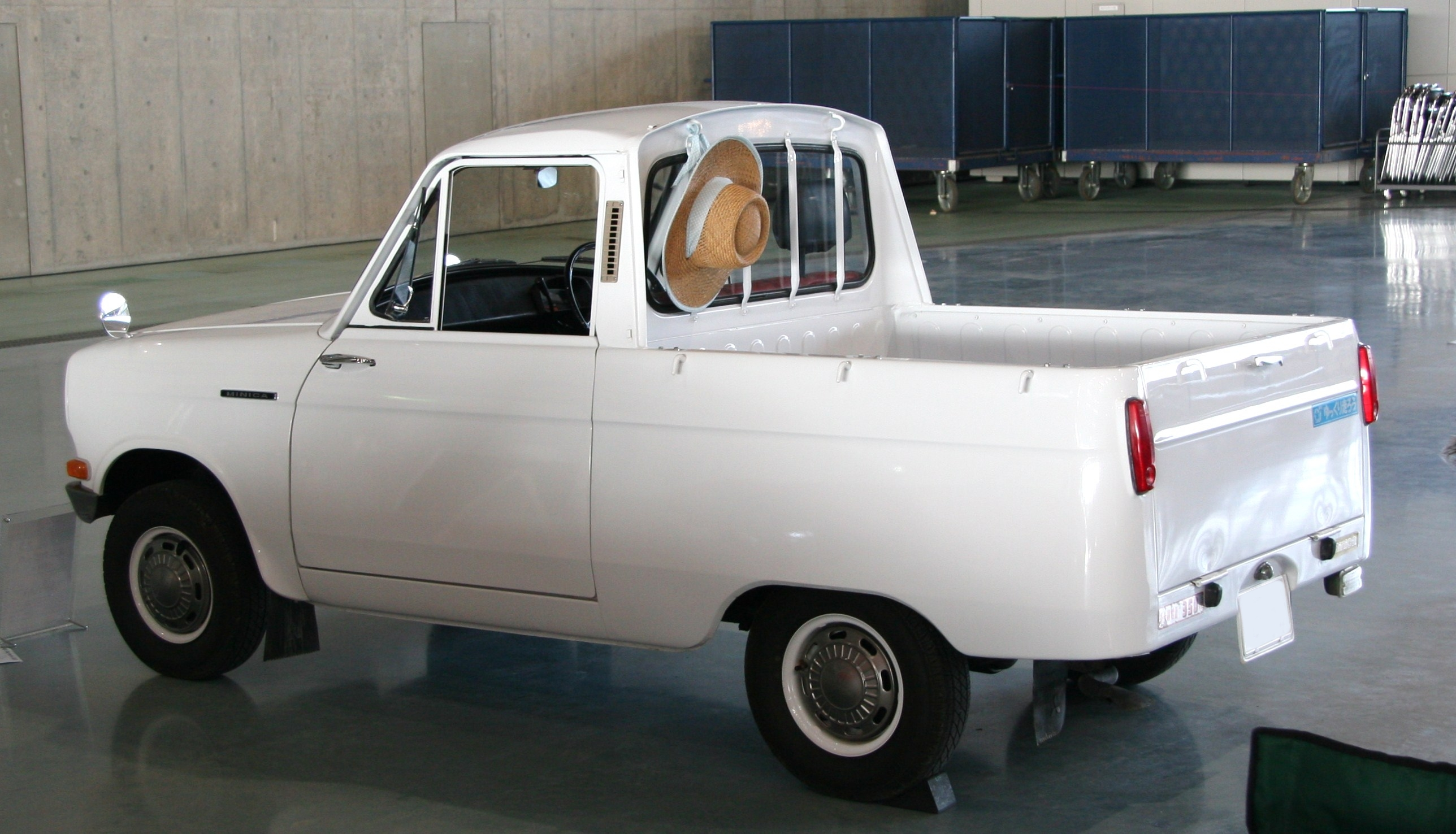
rear view of LT25

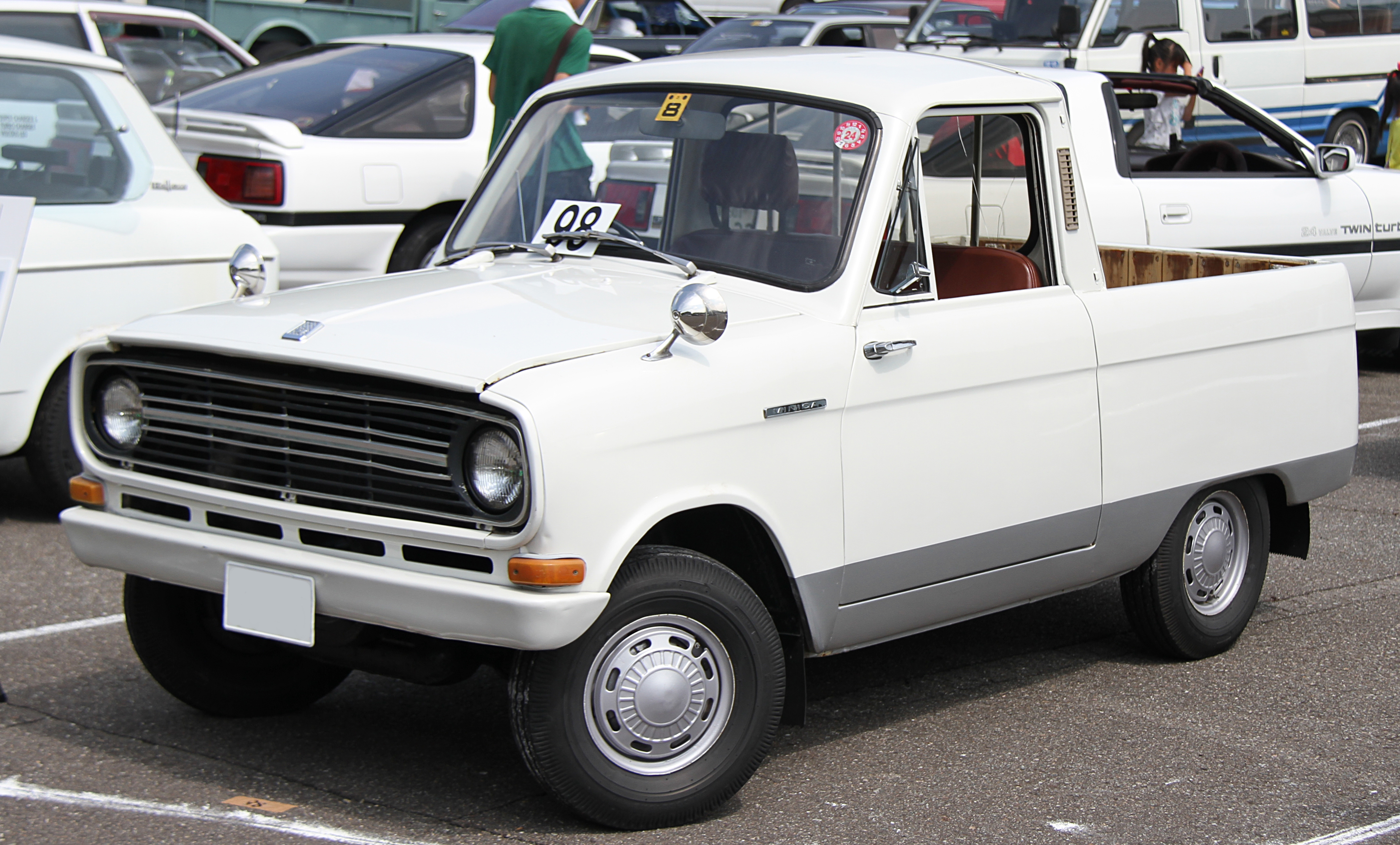
Later model (1969) Minica Pickup

=== Minica Sedan ===
1st generation
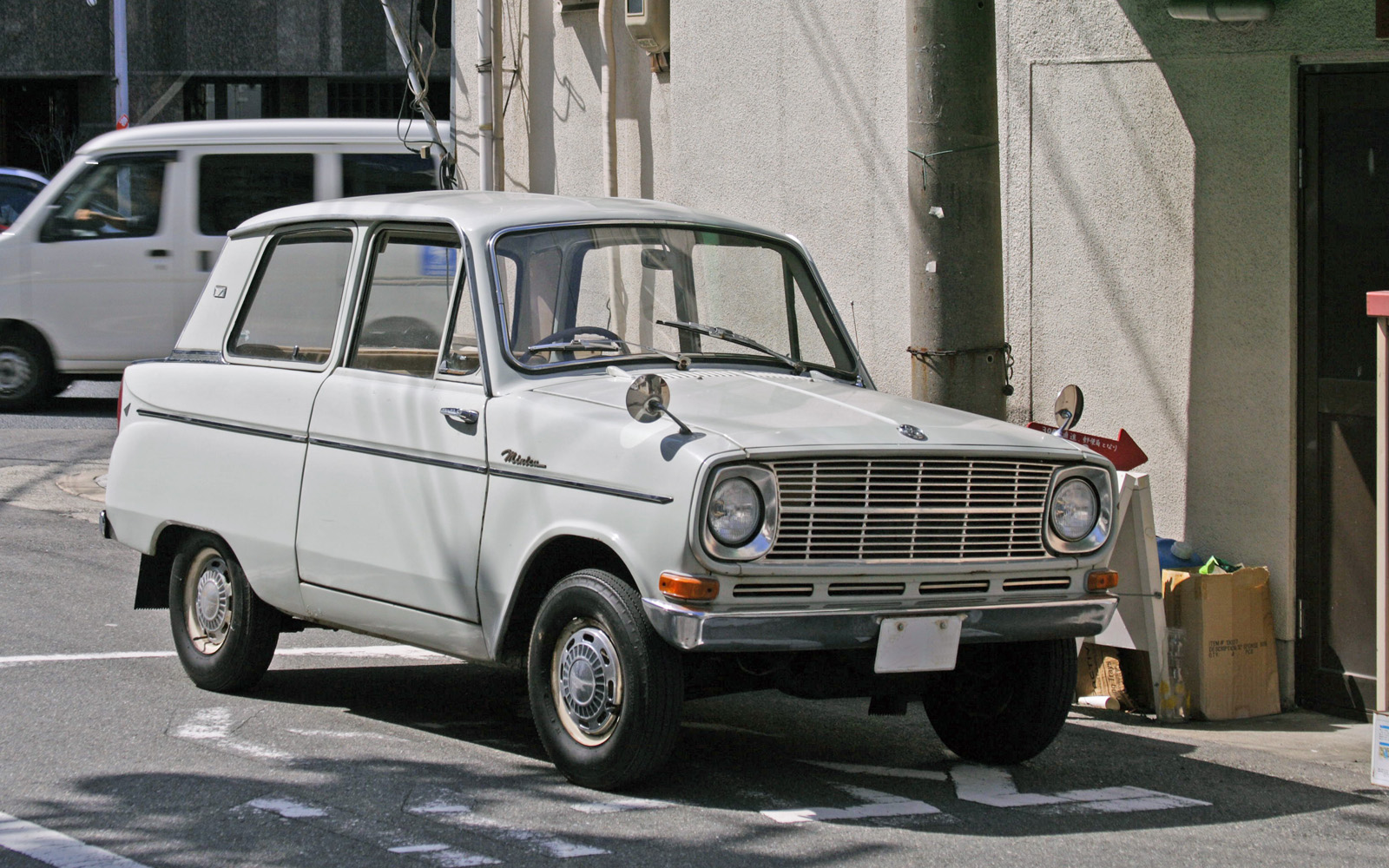
- 1962 Mitsubishi Minica

Overview
- Production: October 1962 – July 1969

Body and chassis
- Body style: 2-door sedan
- Platform: LA20/21/23

Powertrain
- Engine: 359 cc ME21/ME24/ME24D air-cooled two-stroke I2; 359 cc 2G10 two-stroke I2
- Power output: ME21: 17 PS at 4,800 rpm; ME24: 18 PS at 4,800 rpm; ME24D: 21 PS at 5,500 rpm; 2G10: 23 PS at 5,500 rpm

The first Minica (LA20) was first introduced in October 1962 as a two-door sedan based on the Mitsubishi 360 light truck, sharing its front-mounted ME21 359 cc twin-cylinder air-cooled engine driving the rear wheels, transverse leaf springs in front and beam axle/leaf springs at the rear. Top speed was marginally higher at 86 km/h (53 mph). Initially featuring tailfins and a scalloped rear windshield, in November 1964 the Minica (and 360) received a facelift and the improved ME24 engine (LA21). Power output was up by one, to 18 PS (13 kW), with the new "Auto Mix" system removing the need for premixing oil and gasoline.

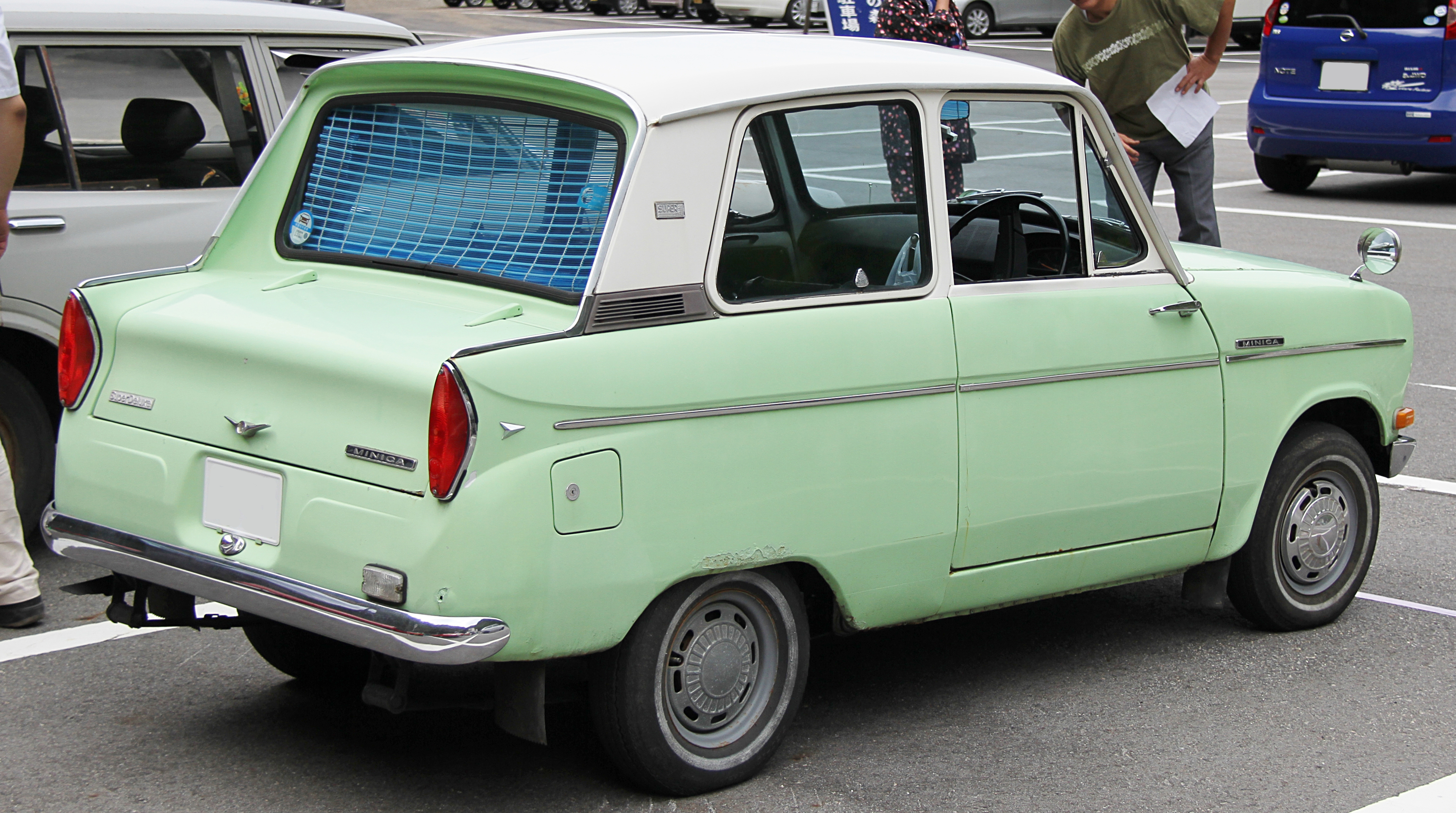
Rear view

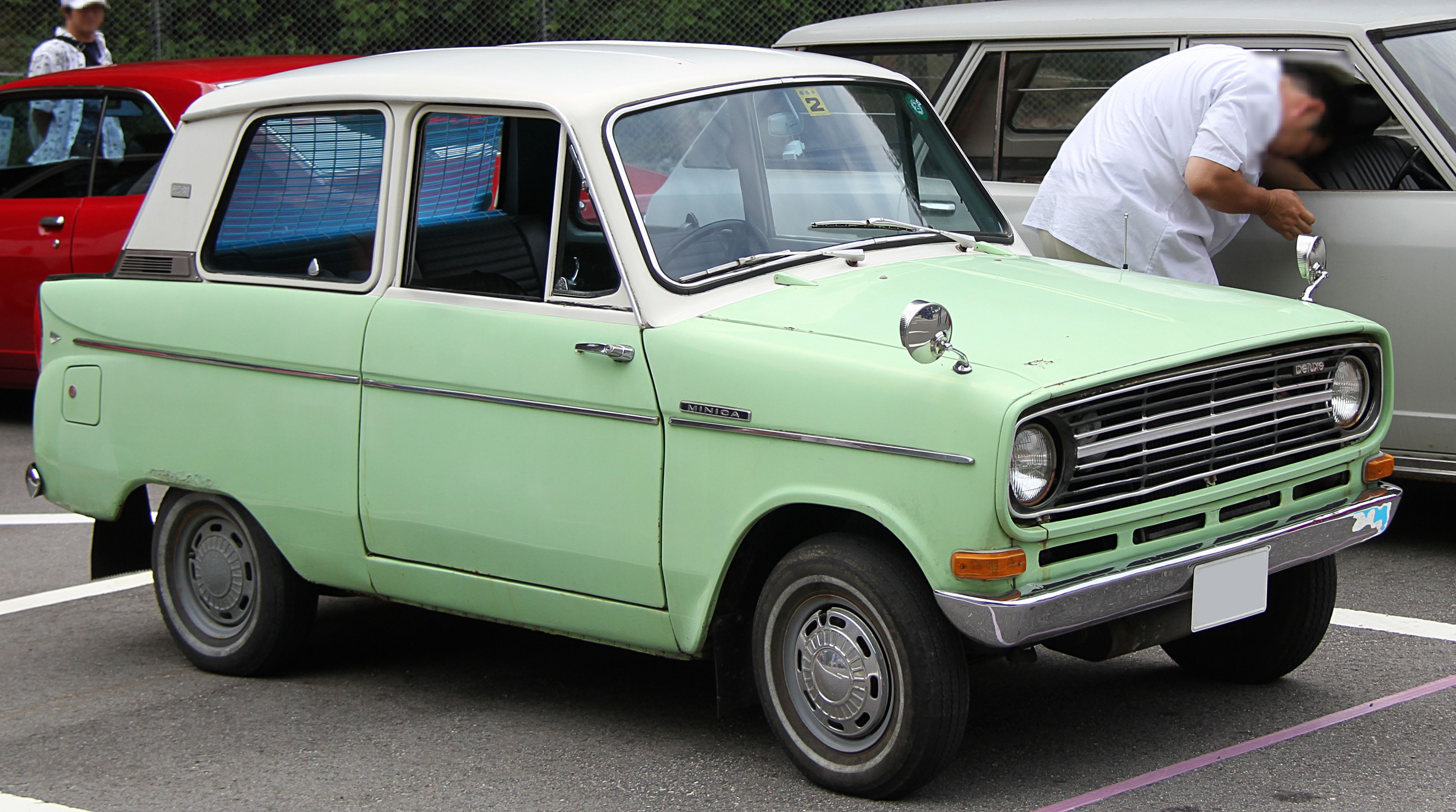
LA23 DeLuxe, note different grille

In December 1966, along with a slightly different grille and new badging, a basic "Standard" Minica sedan was added, while the regular version was promoted to "Deluxe". Prices were ¥340,000 and ¥368,000 respectively.

In May 1967, the Minica was given another minor update, with a modified dashboard and a padded center to steering wheel. The engine was also upgraded, with the new reed valve ME24D providing a useful 21 PS. In September of the following year, a Super Deluxe grade was added, using the new 23 PS (17 kW) water-cooled 2G10 engine developed for the next-generation Minica. This (the LA23) also featured a full vinyl interior and a new plastic grille, as was simultaneously introduced on the Mitsubishi 360 van. With the July 1969 introduction of the second-generation Minica, the LA series was discontinued.

== Second generation ==
2nd generation
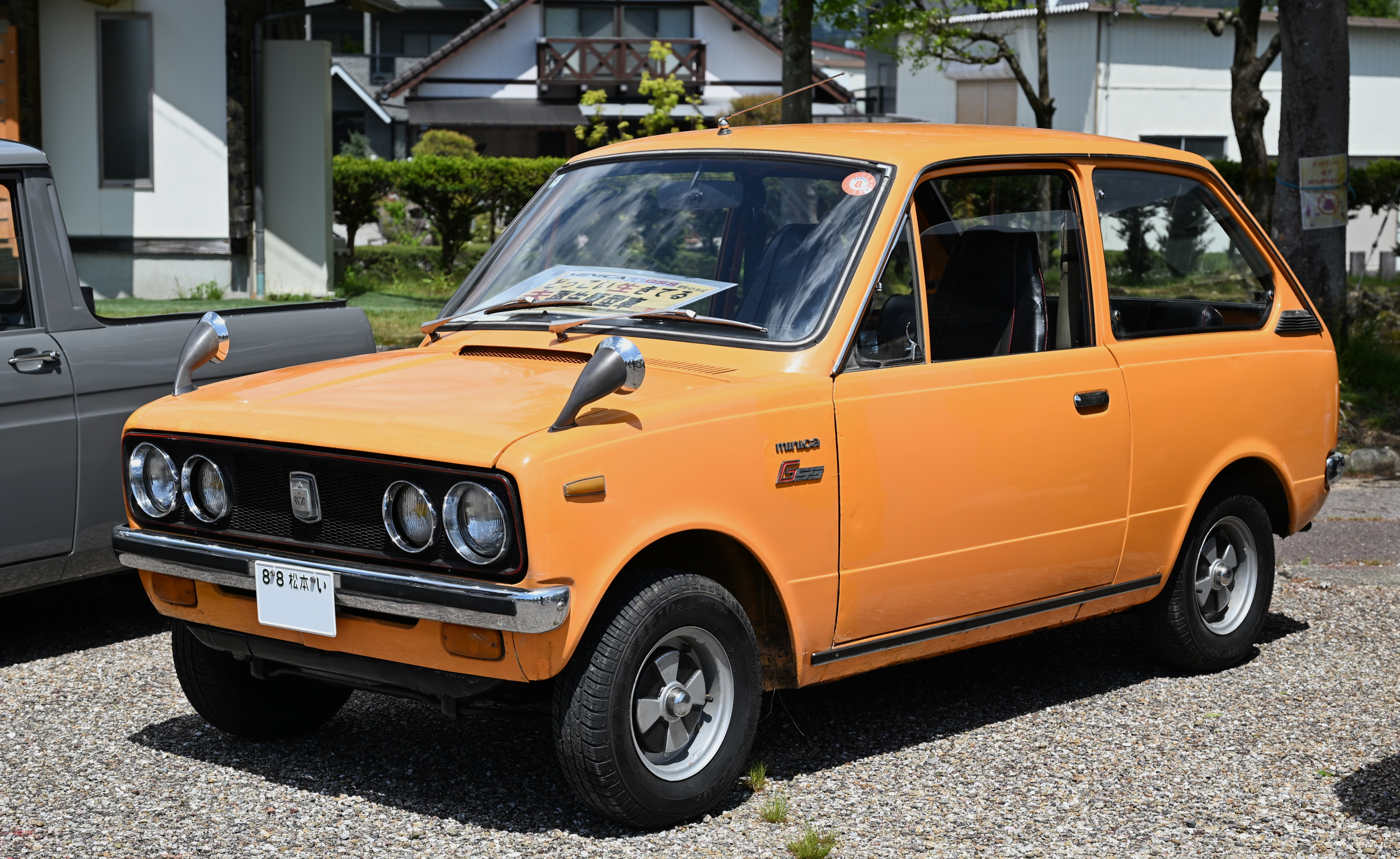
- 1970 Mitsubishi Minica 70 GSS

Overview
- Production: Sedan: 1969–1973; Van: 1969–1981; Coupe (Skipper): 1971–1974

Body and chassis
- Body style: 3-door hatchback 2-door wagon 2-door coupé
- Platform: A100/100V・A101/101V・A102・A104V/105V・A106V

Powertrain
- Engine: 359 cc ME24E/F air-cooled two-stroke I2 (A100/100V); 359 cc 2G10 two-stroke I2 (A101/101V); 359 cc 2G21 SOHC I2 (A102); 471 cc 2G22 SOHC I2 (A104V); 546 cc 2G23 SOHC I2 (A105V)

Dimensions
- Wheelbase: 1,900 mm (74.8 in)
- Length: 2,995 mm (117.9 in)
- Width: 1,295 mm (51.0 in)
- Height: 1,305–1,390 mm (51.4–54.7 in)
- Curb weight: 445–490 kg (981–1,080 lb)

The second-generation Minica 70 was introduced in July 1969 with a three-door hatchback body called a "sedan" by Mitsubishi. Alone in the kei car class, the traditional, front engine, rear-wheel drive layout was retained. The chassis has coil springs front and rear, MacPherson struts up front, and a five-link rigid rear axle. The new styling featured a rear hatch, a Kei class first. Two 359 cc 2G10 water-cooled two-stroke powerplants were optionally available (A101), either the Red 28 PS (21 kW) engine (Super Deluxe, Sporty Deluxe) or the Gold engine fitted with twin SU carburetors developing 38 PS (28 kW). The Gold engine, introduced in December 1969, was fitted as standard to the SS and GSS sport models introduced at the same time. The basic Standard and Deluxe versions (A100) were still fitted with the old 26 PS (19 kW) ME24E air-cooled engine Yellow engine, for a top speed of 105 km/h (65 mph). The better equipped Hi-Deluxe version also appeared in December 1969.

A two-door wagon body was also added in December 1969 and was to remain in production until its eventual replacement by the Minica Econo in 1981. In October 1970 the ME24F Yellow engine gained four horsepower for a total of 30 PS (22 kW) (the Van did not receive this upgrade) while the Red engine went up to 34 PS (25 kW). The GSS version gained integrated foglights and four round headlight, while the SS was discontinued at the same time. A luxurious GL version was also introduced during 1970, featuring high-back bucket seats in front along with the twin headlights and broader taillights seen on the sporting variants.

In February 1971 a very minor facelift meant the car was now called Minica 71. Revised styling featured wider taillights and trim changes, and the water-cooled 2G10 engine became available in the lower priced Family Deluxe.

By September 1971, with the introduction of the Minica 72, the sedan versions were no longer available with the powerful Gold engine. Changes were limited to a new honeycomb grille, taillights (incorporating amber turnsignals) and a new dash similar to that of the Skipper. The Sporty Deluxe version was also discontinued.

In October 1972 the 2nd-generation Minica received its last facelift, becoming the Minica 73 as a low-cost alternative to the new F4. Marketed either as a Standard or a Deluxe, only the de-tuned 31 PS (2G10-5) Red engine also used in the Van versions was now available, placing the "73" firmly at the bottom of the Minica lineup, and air-cooled engines were nolonger available. One year later, a Van Custom was added, with four headlights and more extensive equipment. In late 1974 or early 1975 the Van was updated to accept new larger license plates that were now required. The Van continued with the two-stroke 2G10-5 engine until being replaced by the bigger-engined Minica 5 Van (A104V) in March 1976.

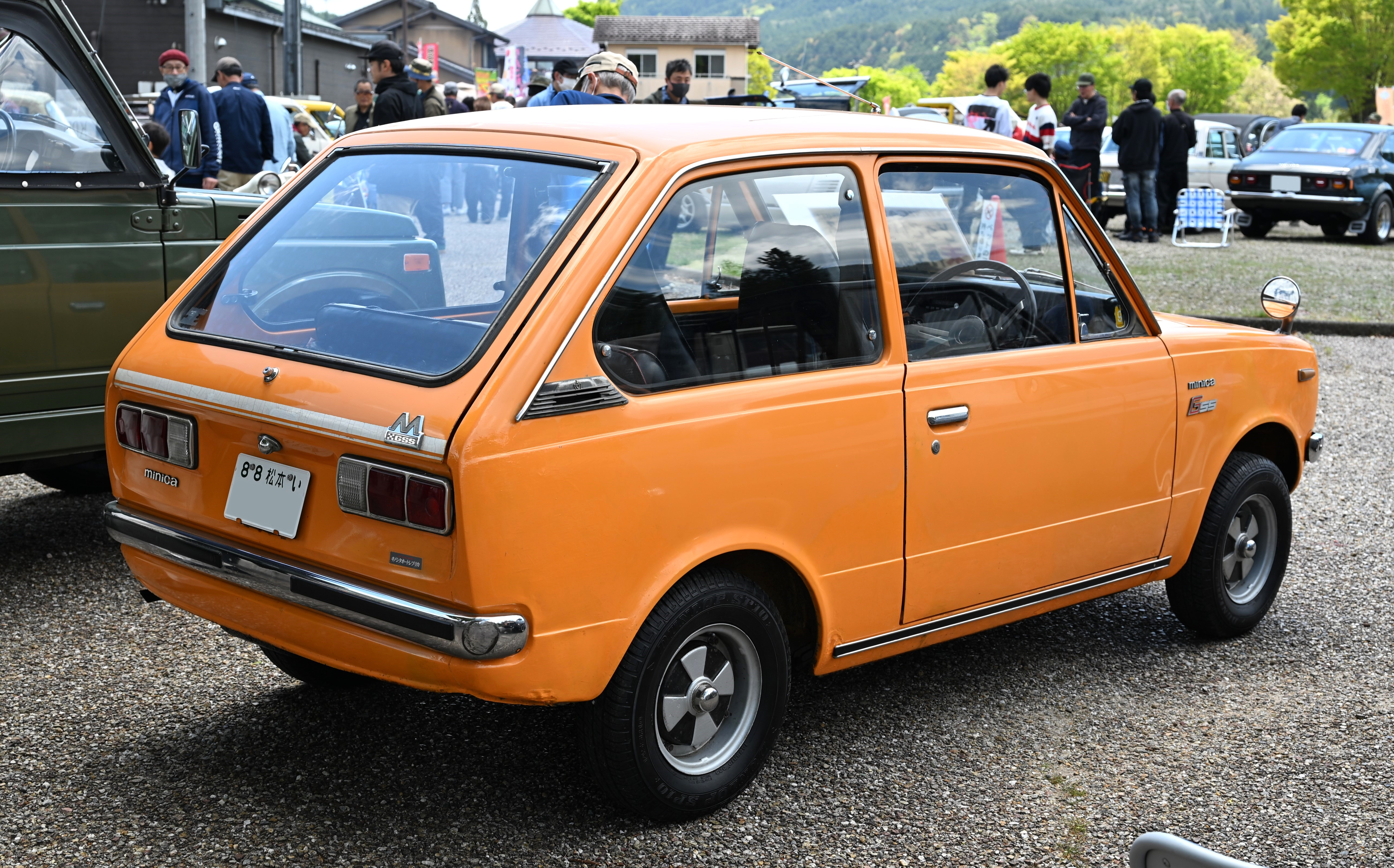
Minica '70 GSS; rear view

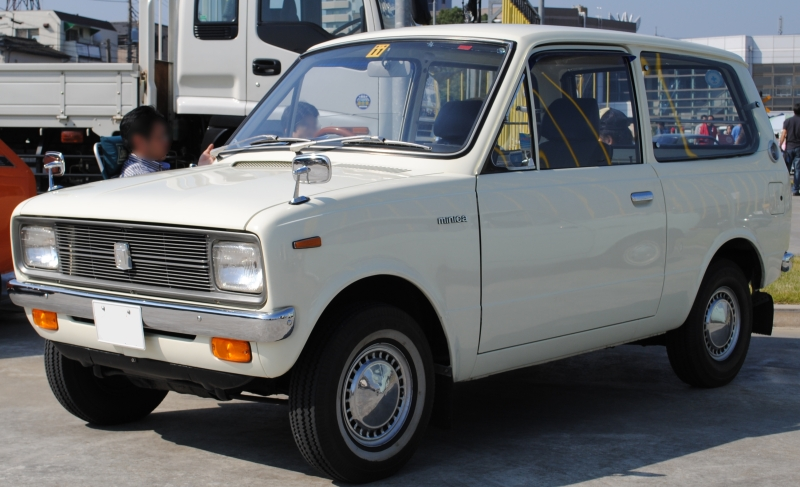
1969–1973 Mitsubishi Minica Van (A100V)

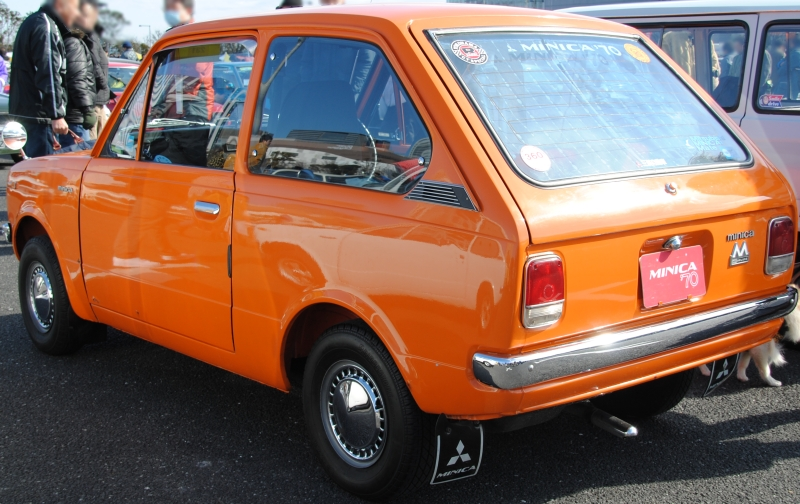
Rear view of Minica '70; lower-end models received different taillight and headlight treatment

=== Minica Skipper ===
The Minica Skipper (A101C) was introduced in May 1971 as a two-door coupé with liftable rear window, and a choice of Red or Gold 2G10 engines. The Skipper was available either as the S/L, L/L or GT. This also meant that the GSS sedan was gradually becoming obsolete, as the focus of the sportier Minicas shifted to the coupé versions. Styling wise, the Skipper represented a miniature version of the seminal hardtop Mitsubishi Galant GTO. To allow for a combination of fastback styling with rearward visibility, the rearmost panel featured a small window. The top rear window opened for access to the luggage area, which featured a folding rear seat. Besides chassis and internals, the Skipper shared the front clip and lower door panels with the sedan.

In October 1972 the coupé was renamed Skipper IV (A102), as it received the new four-stroke 2G21 engine from the Minica F4, with either 32 or 36 PS. A new F/L model replaced the S/L in the lineup. Along with some safety improvements in October 1973 both engines were replaced by the 30 PS (22 kW) "Vulcan S" engine, as the Skipper IV lineup was further narrowed. The coupé continued in production until July (or perhaps December) 1974, and was more restricted by emissions regulations. Mitsubishi revived the "Skipper" nameplate in 1996 on a special, "town" version of the Pajero Mini.

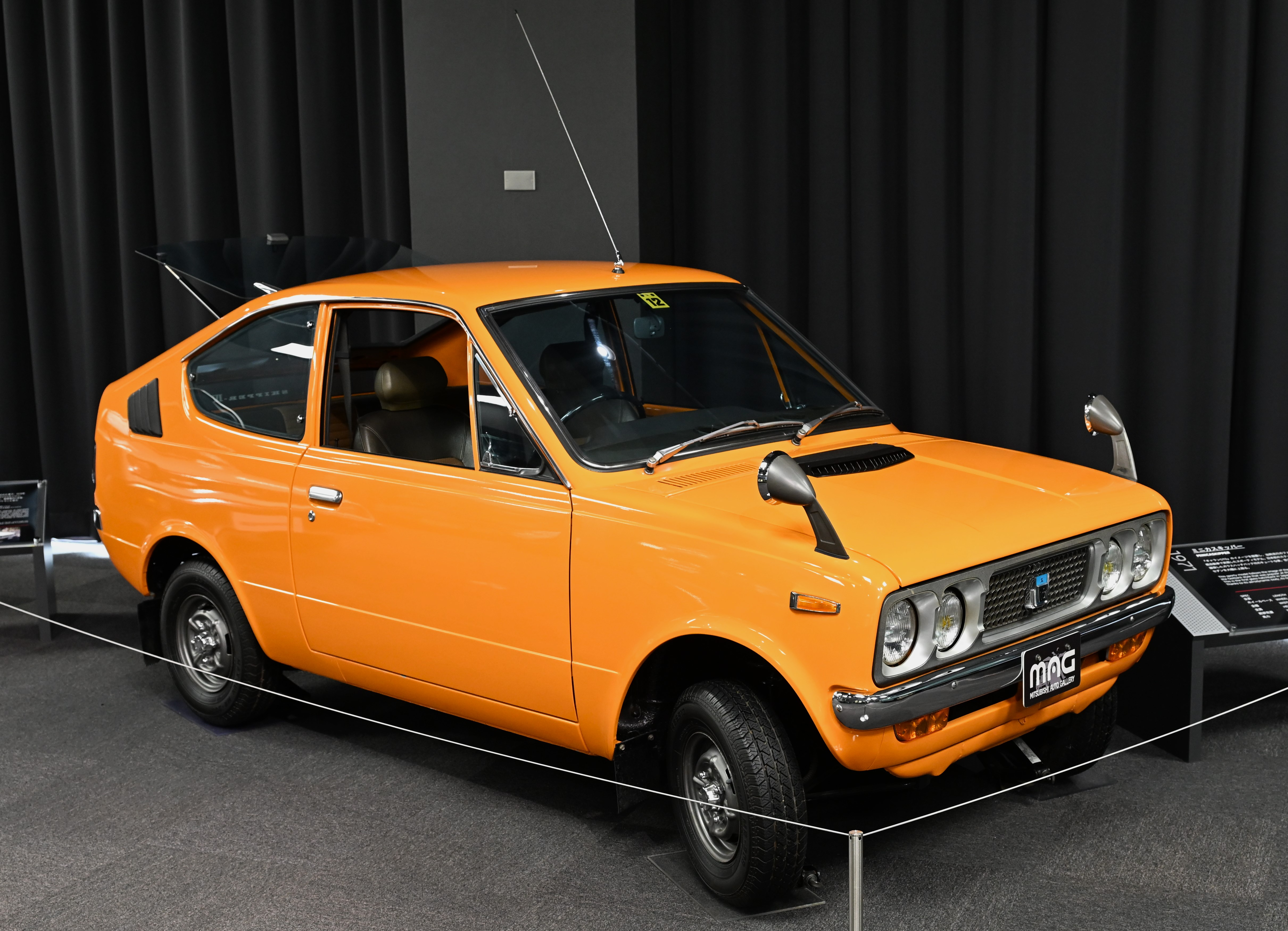
1973 Minica Skipper IV

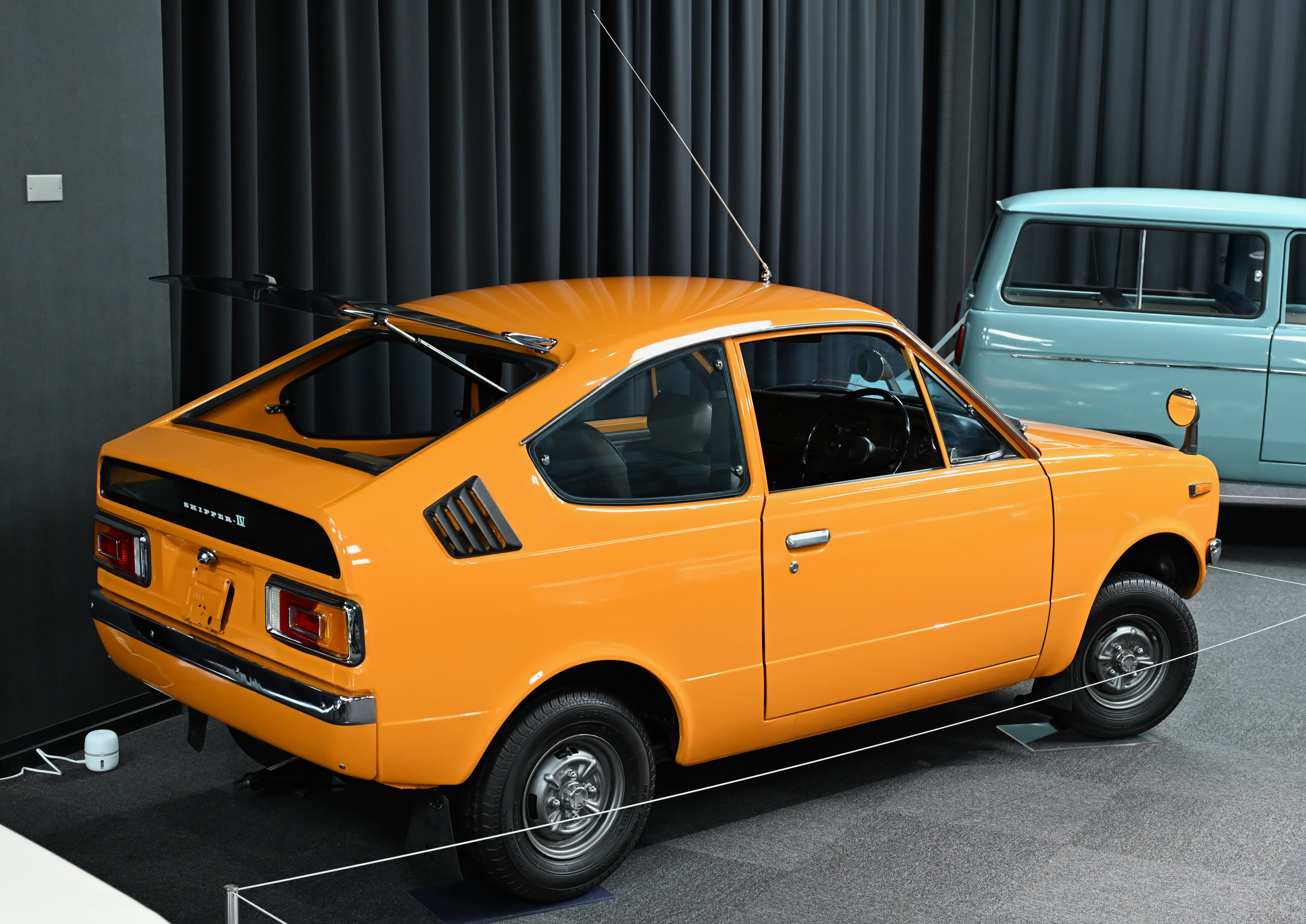
Skipper IV; rear view

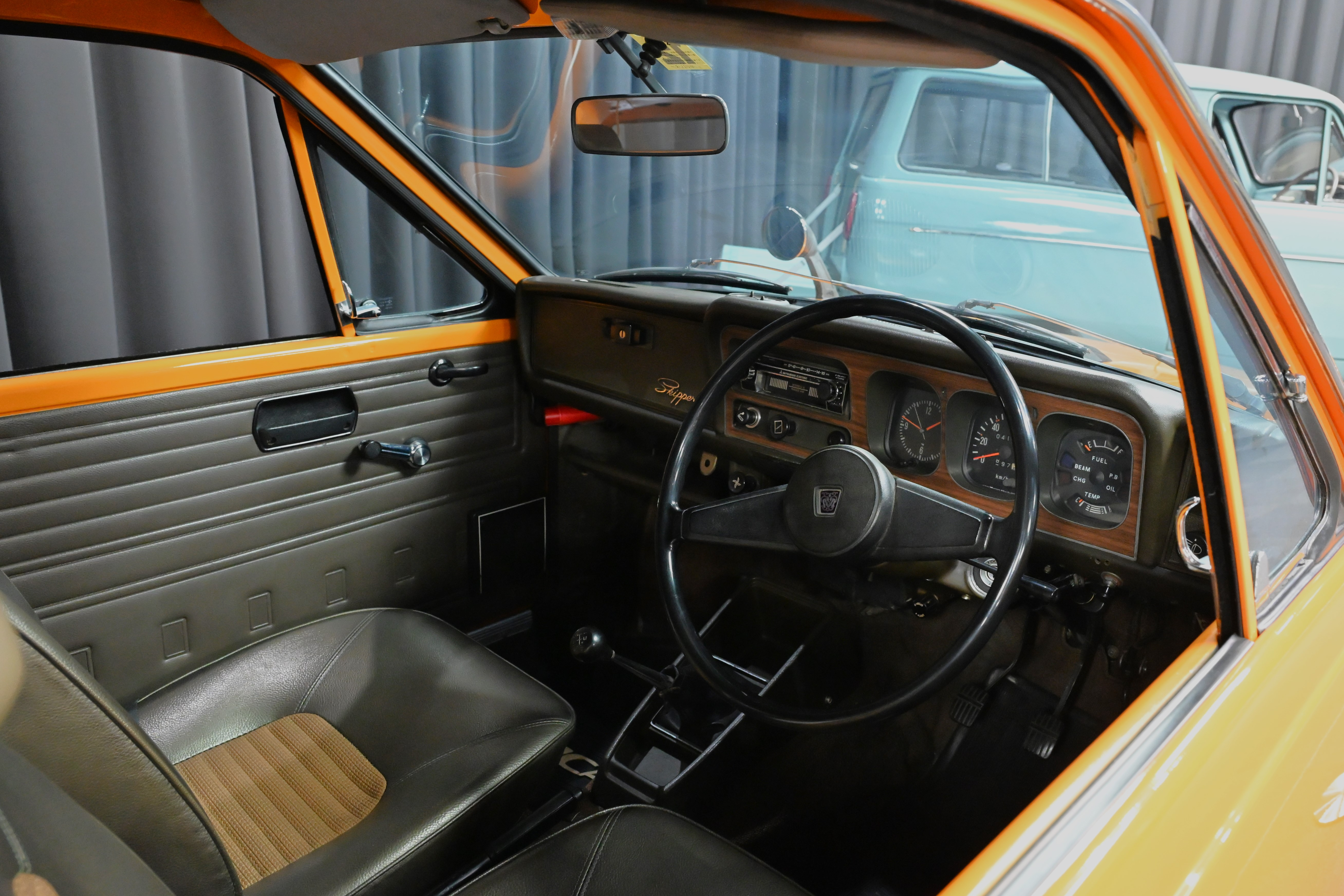
Skipper IV; interior

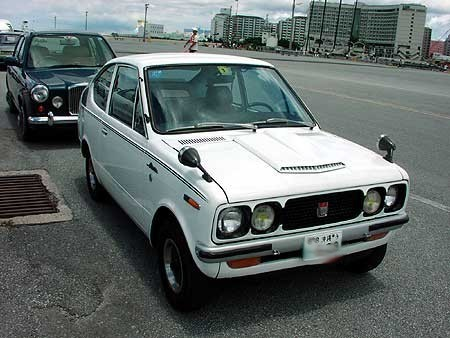
Rare LHD Minica Skipper in Okinawa, a "729 car"

=== Minica Van ===
The Minica Van, based on the 1969 Minica 70, was kept in production until eventually replaced by the Minica Econo in 1981.

The Van's history begins with the air-cooled A100V, which was replaced by the water-cooled A101V in late 1972. There was no A102 nor A103 Van (numbers retained for the water-cooled and four-stroke derivatives), as the A101V remained available only with the air-cooled "Red" two-stroke engine until the introduction of the larger displacement, four-stroke Minica 5 Van (A104V) in March 1976. This was soon followed by the bigger engined "Minica 55 Van" (A105V), which has the newer 2G23 engine with 29 PS (21 kW) at 5500 rpm. The 55 Van was available in a few different equipment levels, from the Standard at the bottom to the Super Deluxe on top.

Mitsubishi also used the Minica Van as the basis for an experimental electric vehicle. In December 1969 the Mitsubishi E12X was presented, a small electric van which had been in development since 1966, together with Mitsubishi Electric, Japan Storage Battery Company, and TEPCO. A small number was built and field tested by TEPCO. This was followed up in mid-1971 with an additional ten examples of the E12, an improved version based on the A101V Minica Van. The E12's top speed was 80 km/h (50 mph), and it had a range of 70 km (43 mi). It could reach 30 km/h (19 mph) from standing in 3.5 seconds; these figures represented a considerable improvement over the earlier E12X.

== Third generation ==
3rd generation
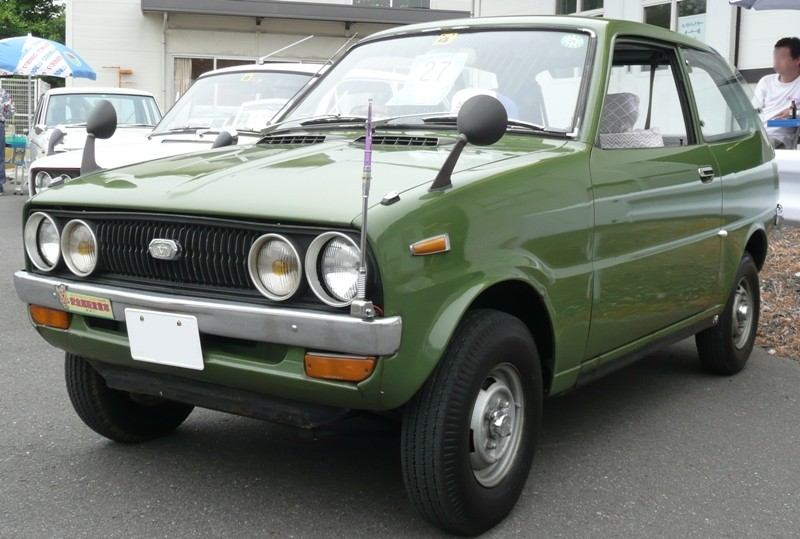
- 1973/74 Minica F4 GL

Overview
- Production: 1972–1977

Body and chassis
- Body style: 3-door sedan
- Platform: A103A・A104A

Powertrain
- Engine: 359 cc 2G21 SOHC I2; 471 cc 2G22 SOHC I2; 546 cc 2G23 SOHC I2

Dimensions
- Wheelbase: 2,000 mm (78.7 in)
- Length: 2,995–3,175 mm (117.9–125.0 in)
- Width: 1,295–1,395 mm (51.0–54.9 in)
- Height: 1,315 mm (51.8 in)
- Curb weight: 515–565 kg (1,135–1,246 lb)

The third-generation Minica was introduced as the Minica F4 (A103A) in October 1972 with a 359 cc OHC engine in the same layout, but featuring a liftable clam-shell rear window as on the coupé. The Skipper continued in production, as of October 1973 with the new engine (becoming the Minica Skipper IV). The new four-stroke Vulcan 2G21 MCA engine (Mitsubishi Clean Air) was much cleaner than, but not as smooth running as its two-stroke predecessors. The six single-carb-engined versions provided 32 PS (24 kW) while the twin-carb version listed for the GS and GSL models offered 36 PS (26 kW). The Van range continued to use the previous body.

In late 1973, facing shrinking Kei-car sales, Mitsubishi narrowed the Minica F4 range down to four equipment levels (Hi-Standard, Deluxe, GL and SL), with the cheaper versions featuring a new grille. The sporty versions were discontinued, as the twin-carb engine fell foul of new emissions regulations. The modified Vulcan S engine came equipped with a balance shaft (later baptised "Silent Shaft") and was cleaner yet, hence the "MCA-II" tag. Power, however, was down to 30 PS. Top speed was 115 km/h (71 mph). In December 1974, the lineup was again revamped, with the GL and SL becoming the Super Deluxe and Custom. Mitsubishi also lightly redesigned the Minica to accept the new, bigger license plates now required for Kei cars.

On 12 April 1976 (March for the Minica 5 Van), corresponding to revised kei car regulations of January 1976 (length up to 3.2 m, width to 1.4 m and engine size to 550 cc) both the sedan and the van received a new long-stroke 471 cc engine, a small increase in length (entirely due to new, larger bumpers), and a new name, the Minica 5. The Minica 5 was the first kei passenger car to meet the new regulations. Both models were also lightly facelifted, featuring new grilles, while equipment levels remained the same. While power output of the new Vulcan 2G22 did not change for the sedan (A104A), the van (A104V) received a lower powered 28 PS (21 kW) version thereof. The Minica 5 was a mere interim model, anticipating the more thoroughly revised Minica Ami 55 which was soon to arrive.

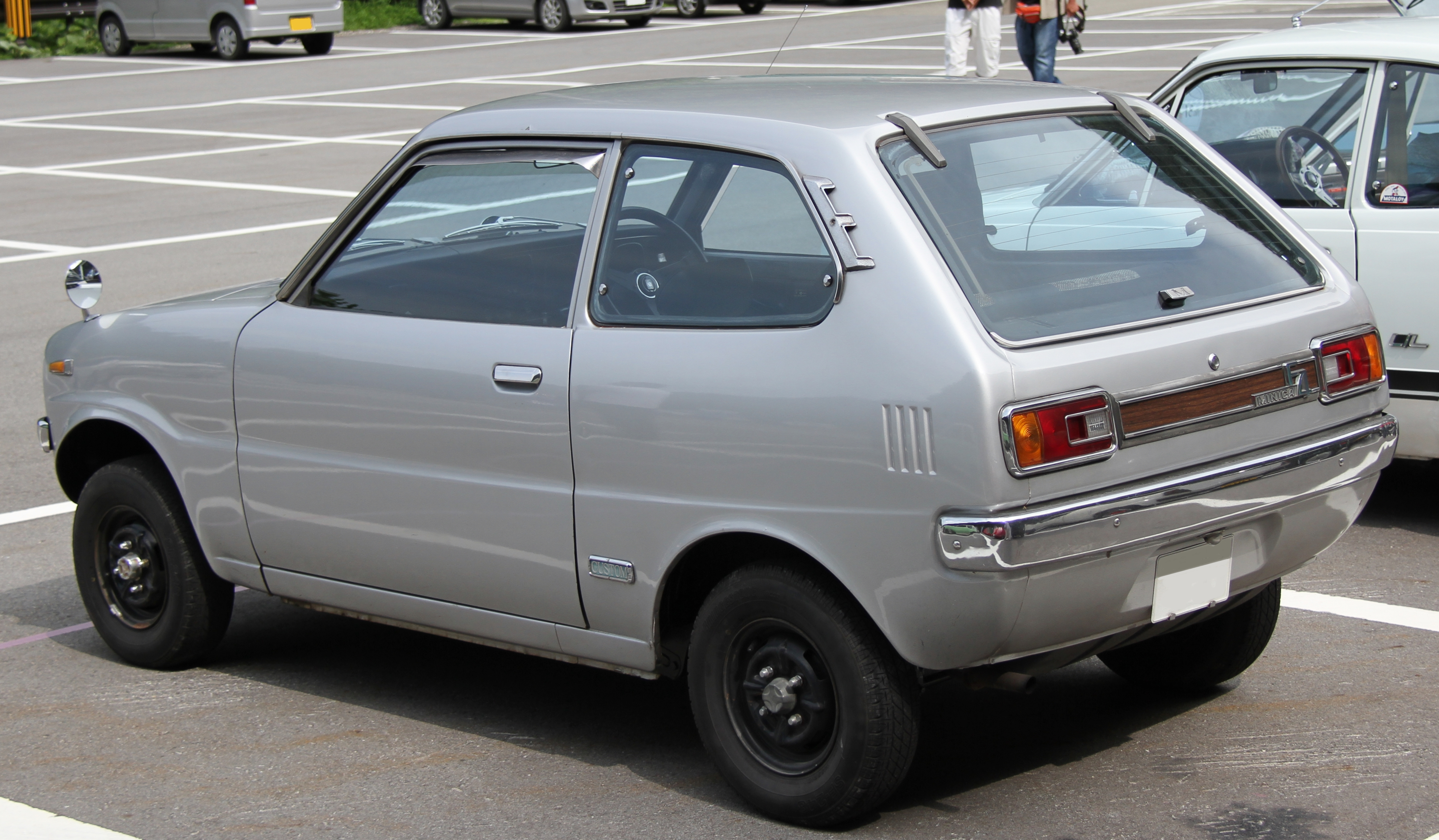
1972–1973 Mitsubishi Minica F4 Custom

1972 Mitsubishi Minica F4 GL

== Fourth generation ==
4th generation
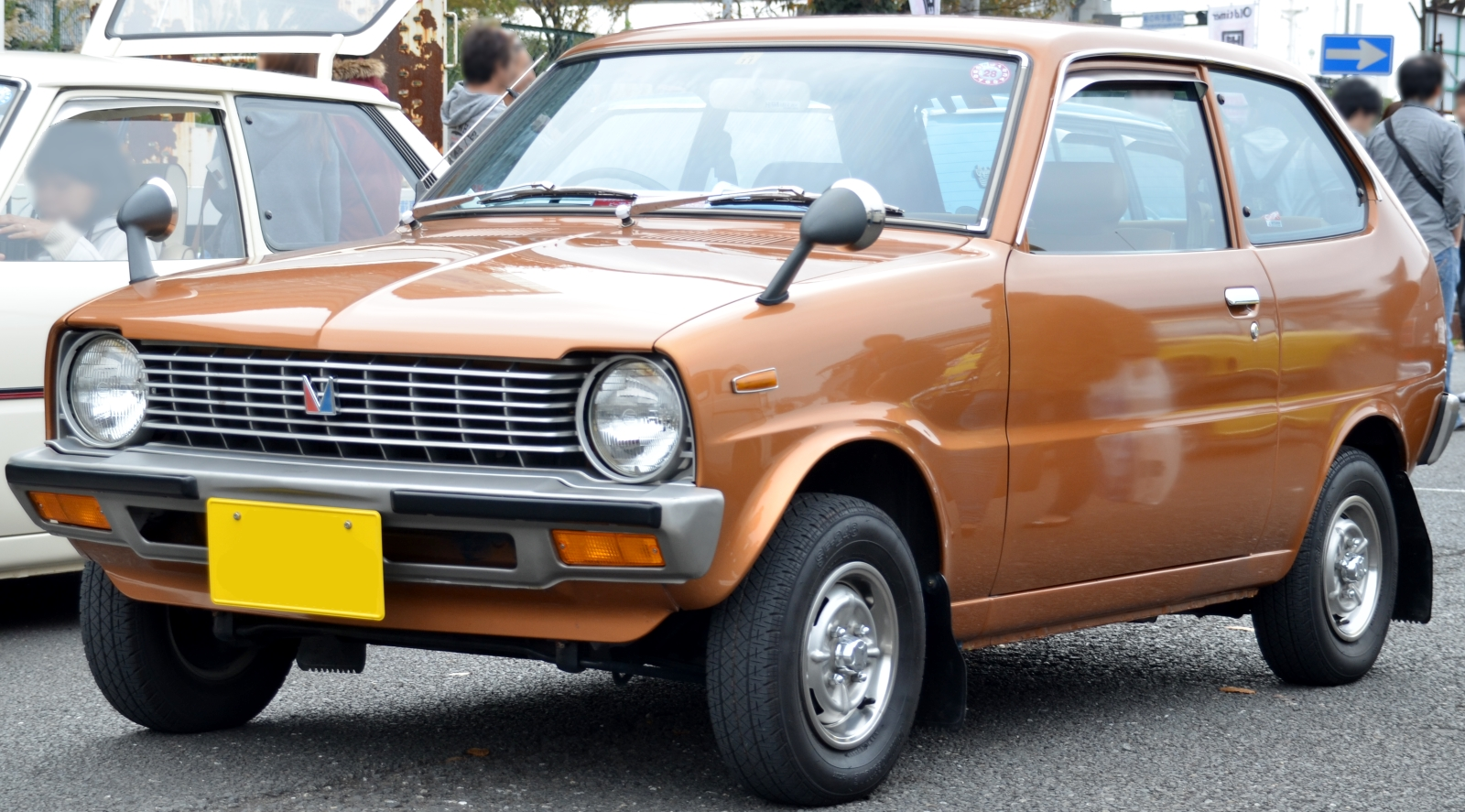
- Minica Ami 55 XL (A105A)

Overview
- Production: 1977–1984

Body and chassis
- Layout: FR
- Platform: A105A・A106A・A107A/V

Powertrain
- Engine: 3-cylinder watercooled

Dimensions
- Wheelbase: 2,050 mm (80.7 in)
- Length: 3,175 mm (125.0 in)
- Width: 1,395 mm (54.9 in)
- Height: 1,315 mm (51.8 in)
- Curb weight: 565 kg (1,246 lb)

In June 1977 the car and engine grew once again, creating the Minica Ami 55. While the side body panels remained the same, length increased yet a little more (3175 mm) and the entire car was widened by 10 mm (0.4 in). The updated 546 cc Vulcan 2G23 engine provided 31 PS (23 kW) for the A105A. Its sibling, the Minica 55 Van (A105V) was updated in March 1977 and was almost impossible to distinguish from the previous Minica 5 Van, aside from badging and a slightly less plasticky front end. The bigger engine provided some useful additional torque, but the sporting Minicas of the early seventies were now a memory. The traditional (and unusual amongst Kei cars) Panhard layout remained.

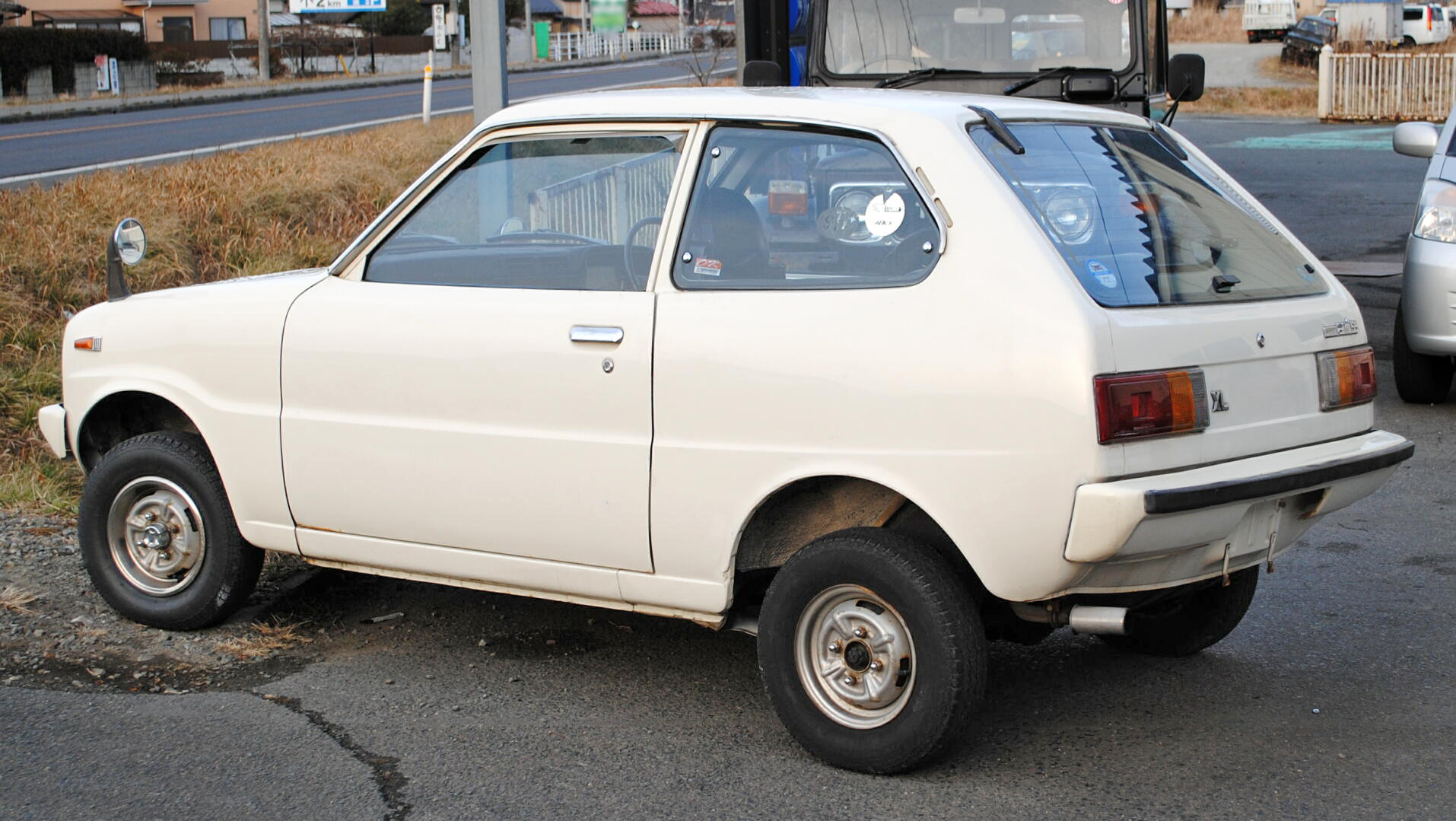
Minica Ami 55 XL (1977–1981 model)

September 1978 brought another engine upgrade: The new "Vulcan II" G23B featured the lean burn MCA-Jet emissions control system with a hemispherical head, aluminium rocker arms and three valves per cylinder, but power outputs remained static. The model code became A106, with A106V used for the van which continued to use the bodywork of the second generation.

In September 1981 the car received another redesign. An entire new rear end meant a slightly longer wheelbase (up to 2,050 mm) and a somewhat longer and taller body. The somewhat boxy rear end, still with a clamshell rear window, looked a bit incongruous paired with the original Minica F4 front wings and doors. The new Minica was renamed the Minica Ami L (A107A), but bigger news was that the Minica 55 Van, based on the 1969 A100V, was finally retired. The new A107V Minica Econo ("Econo" hinting at its primary use as a private economy car rather than as a commercial vehicle) looked very similar to the Ami L but featured a proper rear hatch and folding rear seat, allowing it to be registered as a light commercial vehicle like its competitors the Daihatsu Mira, Suzuki Alto and Subaru Rex. Cargo capacity, compared to the more workmanlike Minica 55 Van, was reduced from 300 to 200 kg (441 lb).

A two-speed, semi-automatic gearbox was also available on all models, while the standard four-speed manual received lower gearing for the Econo model. The engine was more quiet than before, featuring a milder cam profile. Power output of the G23B remained the same, although the Econo was stuck with a 29 PS (21 kW) version of the old 2G23 engine. Top speed of the Ami was 110 km/h (68 mph). In December 1981 a strict two-seater version of the Econo was added. One year later, the Minica was sold with the new "MMC" logo rather than the old "three diamonds". In March 1983 the Minica Ami L Turbo became the first kei car to be offered with a turbocharger, offering 39 PS (29 kW) and glitzy graphics. This proved short-lived, as by January 1984 production of the A107 Minicas had ended, with Mitsubishi preparing for the release of an all new, front-wheel drive Minica.

== Fifth generation ==
5th generation
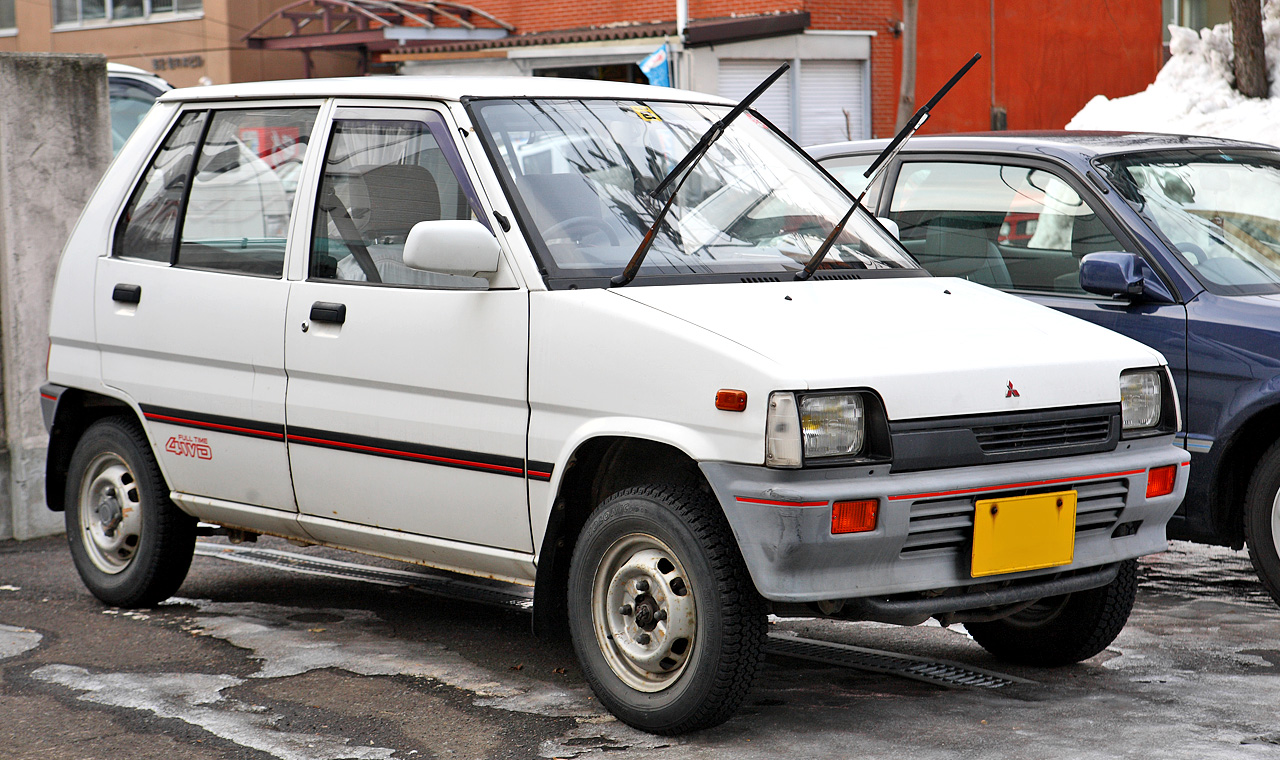

Overview
- Also called: Mitsubishi Towny
- Production: 1984–1989

Body and chassis
- Platform: H11A/V・H12V・H14A/V・H15A/V

Powertrain
- Engine: 546 cc G23B SOHC I2; 548 cc 3G81 SOHC I3; 783 cc 2G25 SOHC I2; 796 cc 3G82 SOHC I3

Dimensions
- Wheelbase: 2,260 mm (89.0 in)
- Length: 3,195 mm (125.8 in)
- Width: 1,395 mm (54.9 in)
- Height: 1,430 mm (56.3 in)
- Curb weight: 580 kg (1,280 lb)

The fifth-generation Minica was introduced in February 1984 as a front engined, front wheel drive vehicle for the first time. It offered three- and five-door configurations, increased size and a torsion beam/coil spring rear suspension. With its "tall-boy" design it was much more spacious inside. It retained the G23B engine, but modernized with a timing belt rather than the old noisy timing chain. The Minica sedan had 33 PS (24 kW), the sparsely trimmed Econo commercial version 31 PS (23 kW), and the Turbo gained an intercooler and now offered 42 PS (31 kW). Air conditioning finally became an option. Reflecting the design improvements, Mitsubishi advertised the car as a worthy competitor for the considerably larger cars of the one-litre class. A considerable improvement on the old model, sales of the passenger model tripled year-on-year in its first month on the market. Sales of the Econo doubled.

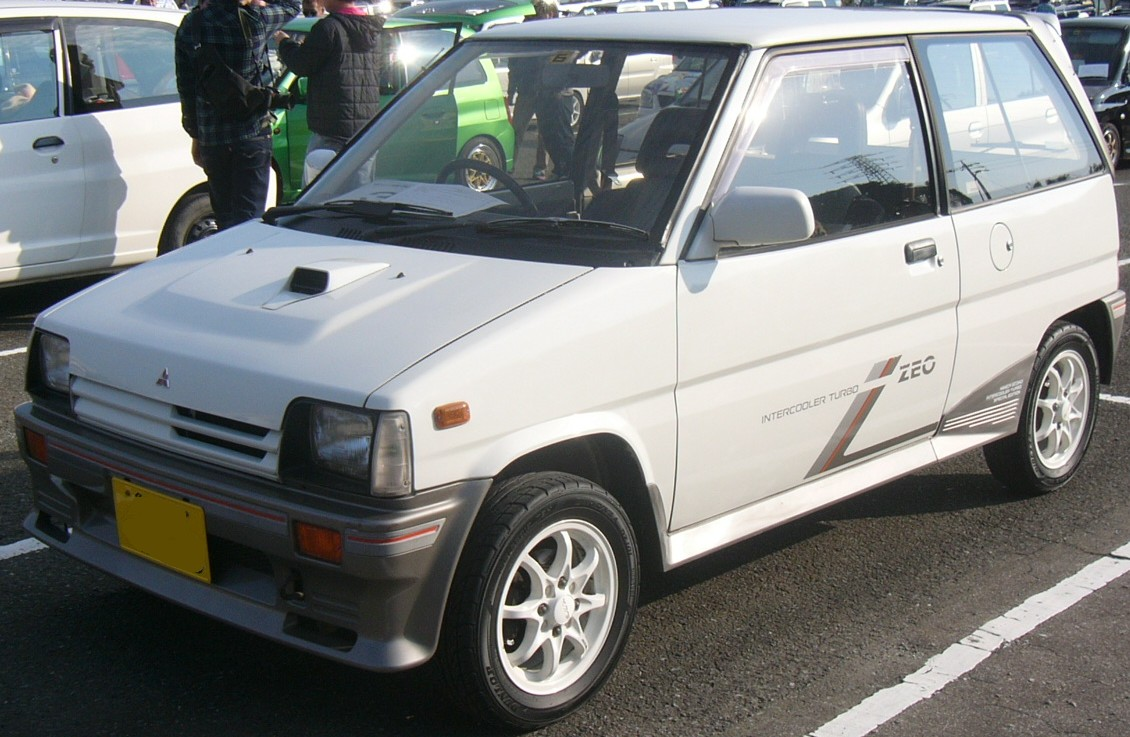
Mitsubishi Minica Econo Turbo ZEO (H14V)

In September 1985, a four-wheel drive model with a live rear axle was introduced. In January 1988, as the bubble economy and the kei-class horsepower war were both heating up, an aero-kit version of the Turbo was introduced to compete with Suzuki's Alto Works and Daihatsu's Mira Turbo TR-XX. Called the Turbo ZEO it was equipped with the same 50 PS (37 kW) carburetted engine as the regular Turbo model; sales were low. There was also a low-priced, well-equipped version of the Minica Econo called the Tico, as well as a new top-of-the-line five-door sedan called the Minica Exceed.

This generation was the first to reach export markets, usually labelled Mitsubishi Towny, originally with a two-cylinder 783 cc engine and a four-speed manual transmission. Beginning in March 1985, the Towny was also locally manufactured by CMC in Taiwan, only as a five-door. In 1987, a three-cylinder 796 cc engine with 45 PS (33 kW) and a five-speed gearbox replaced the earlier drivetrain; a three-door panel van was also marketed abroad.

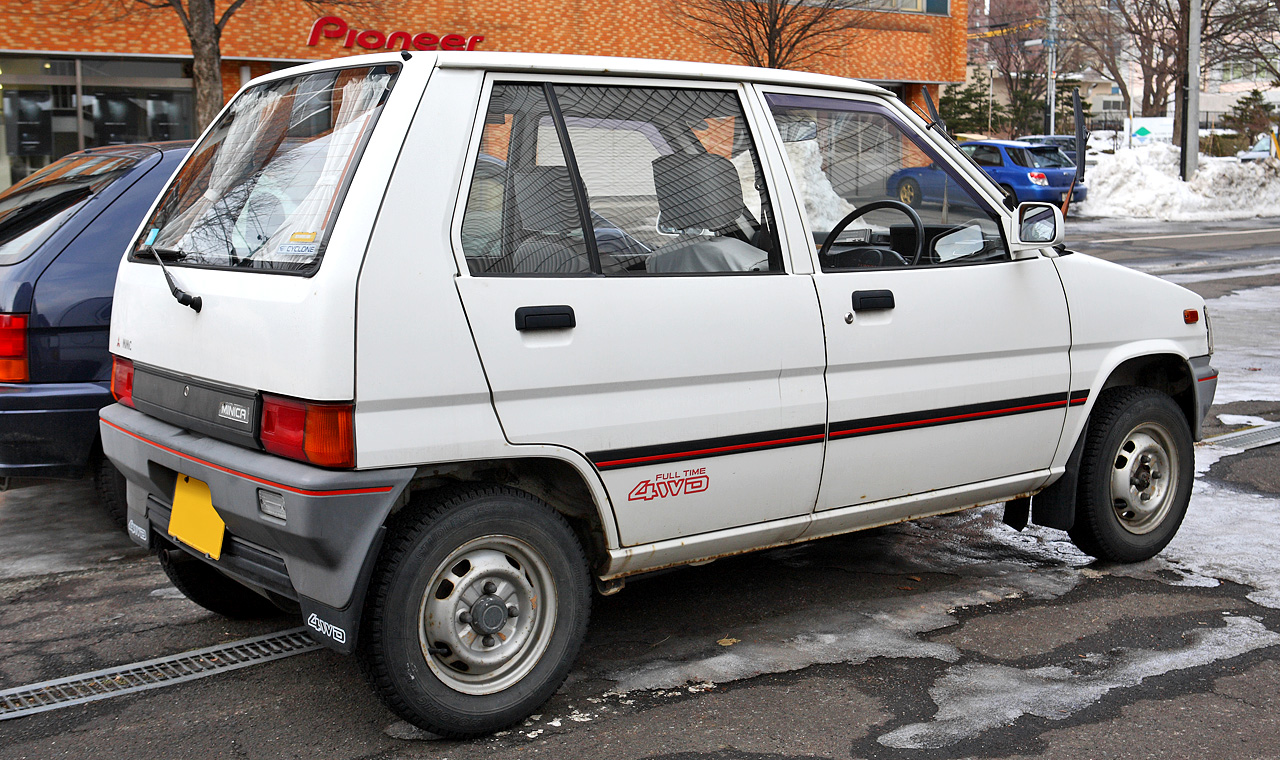
Rear

== Sixth generation ==
6th generation
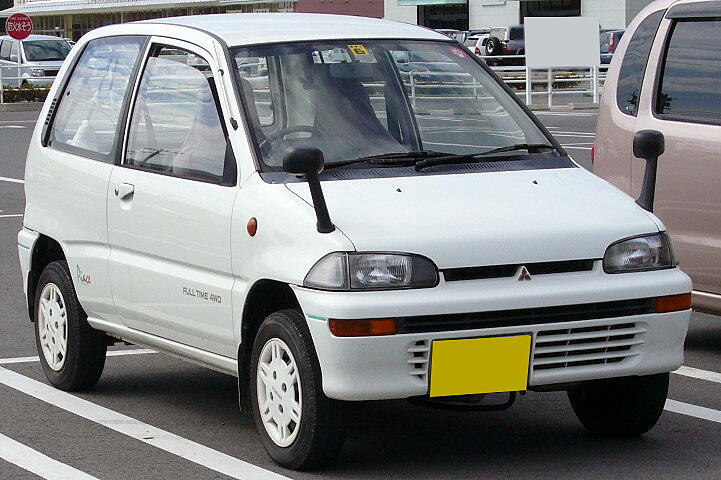
- 1989 Minica Piace 4WD

Overview
- Also called: Mitsubishi Towny
- Production: 1989–1993

Body and chassis
- Related: Mitsubishi Minica Toppo

Powertrain
- Engine: 548 cc 3G81 I3; 548 cc 3G81T turbo I3; 657 cc 3G83 I3; 657 cc 3G83T turbo I3; 796 cc 3G82 SOHC I3

Dimensions
- Wheelbase: 2,260 mm (89.0 in)
- Length: 3,195 mm (125.8 in) (550 cc models); 3,295 mm (129.7 in) (660 cc models)
- Width: 1,395 mm (54.9 in)
- Height: 1,420–1,515 mm (55.9–59.6 in)
- Curb weight: 580–720 kg (1,280–1,590 lb)

In January 1989, the sixth-generation Minica (H21/H26 for front- and four-wheel-drive models respectively) was officially introduced, although the engine, wheelbase, and suspension remained unchanged. In addition to the three-door vans (hatchbacks presumably intended for commercial use) and five-door "sedans" (hatchbacks for private use), a variant with a single door on the right side, two doors on the passenger side, and a liftgate was introduced, named the Minica Lettuce. This was originally a van with a foldable rear seat and flat loading floor, to meet special tax breaks available. In May 1989, the tax benefits were lowered and the Lettuce became classified as a sedan. A three-door passenger car version was introduced at the same time. The asymmetric Minica Lettuce was developed together with the Seiyu supermarket chain, which also sold the car directly. It was meant specifically to simplify the loading of children and shopping.

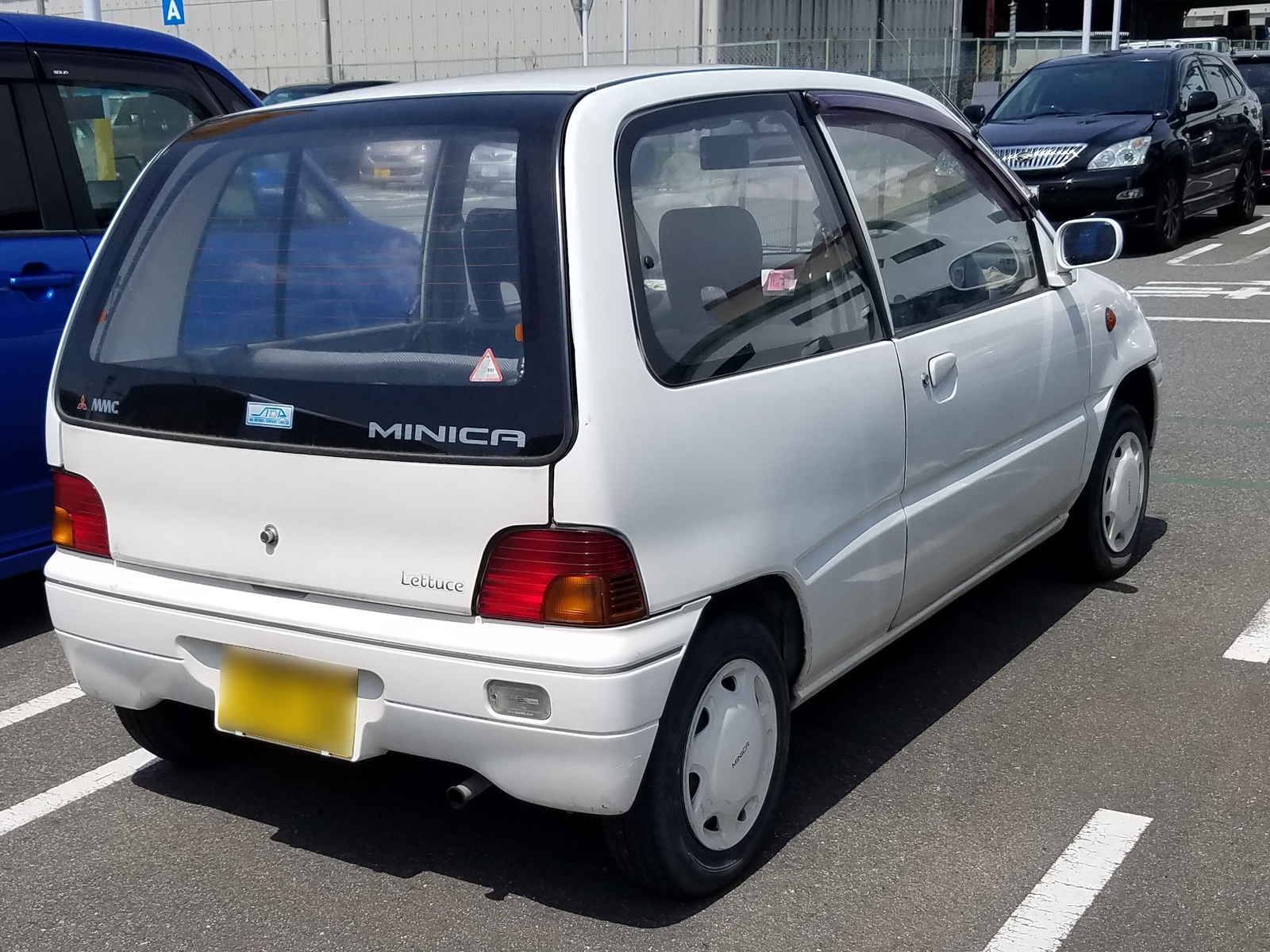
The Minica Lettuce (H21V), notice the two doors on the left side and a single door on the right

The pace of development in the Japanese automobile industry was relentless in the 1980s, leaving the fifth generation Minica looking rather outmoded towards the decade's end. Sales of the fifth generation had dropped to under 27,000 cars in 1988, while almost 77,000 Minicas were sold in 1989 (nearly all being of the new generation).

An advanced new turbocharged engine with double overhead cams and the world's first mass-produced five-valve-per-cylinder engine was introduced for the Dangan ZZ model, producing 64 PS (47 kW). The Dangan was originally a commercial vehicle, but became a passenger car in August 1989. It was later made available in naturally aspirated form as well, as the Dangan Si and Dangan Ri. In May 1991, an automatic option was added to the Dangan ZZ.

The van models gradually lost importance as their tax advantages were whittled away, with buyers increasingly going for the passenger models. In August 1989, however, a new commercial use model appeared in the form of the Minica Walk-Through Van. This version took full advantage of the maximum 2-metre height limitation on kei cars at 1,990 mm (78 in). A response to the Daihatsu Mira walk-through van, the Minica was a hastier, cut-and-shut job and did not sell well enough to be continued for the next generation.

The Kei car standards were altered for 1990, allowing for a 10 cm (3.9 in) increase in length and an increase in displacement to 660 cc. The Minica's engine was now 657 cc, while the front bumper gained 3 cm (1.2 in) and the rear bodywork was altered to grow by 7 cm (2.8 in). The wheelbase remained unchanged, while a black plastic element was added behind the rear windows to fill the extra space. Chassis codes changed to H22 and H27. A tall three-door MPV model with optional four-wheel drive, the Minica Toppo, was also introduced in February 1990 - the Toppo, being developed before the new regulations were finalized, did not take full advantage of them and ended up 4 cm (1.6 in) shorter than other kei cars. The Dangan Turbo only received its increase in displacement and increase in length in August 1990, six months after the rest of the range had been updated.

In January 1992, the range received a light facelift, along with some new models. New were the Piace and Milano sedans, celebrating the thirtieth anniversary of the Minica, and the Dangan ZZ-Limited which received standard ABS brakes. In January 1993, shortly before the line was replaced, the Milano Limited and Milano four-wheel-drive models were added.

Export versions were still usually carrying the "Towny" label and featured an 800 cc 41 PS (30 kW) engine.

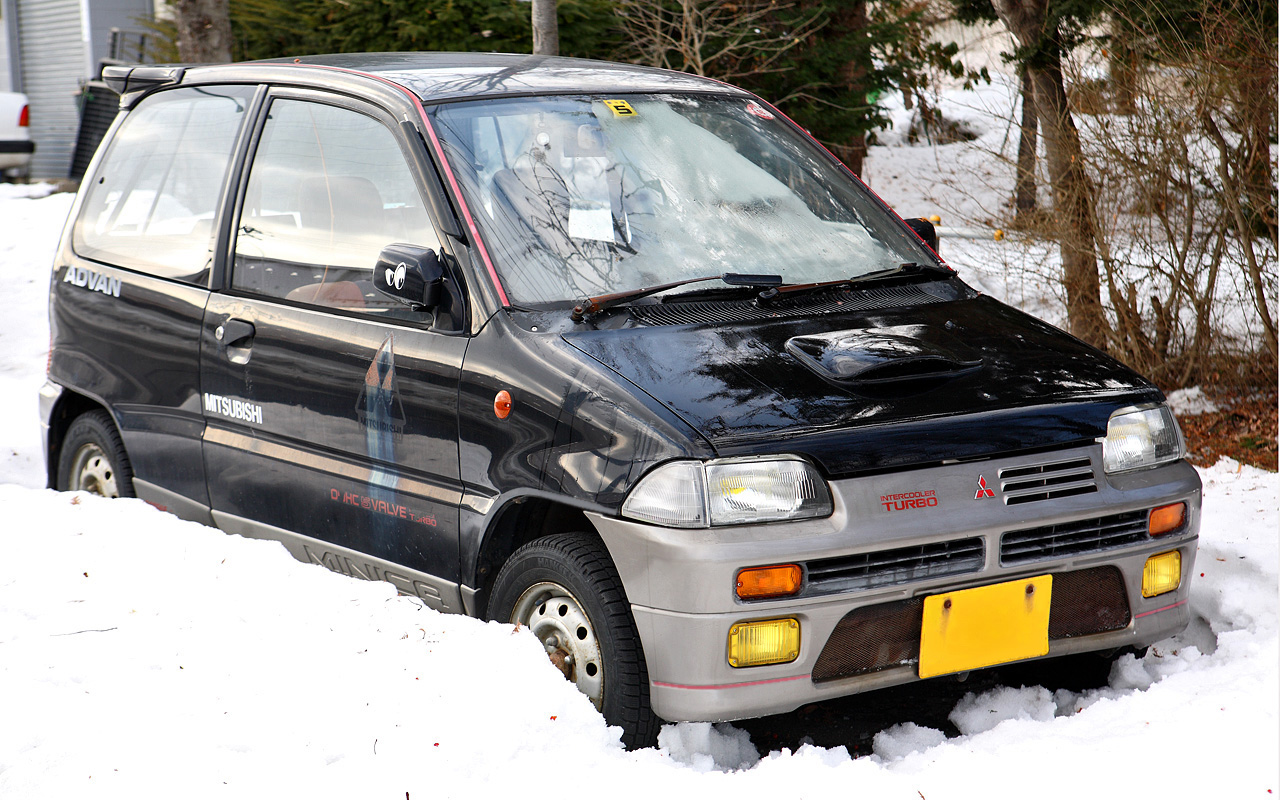
1989 Mitsubishi Minica Dangan ZZ (van)

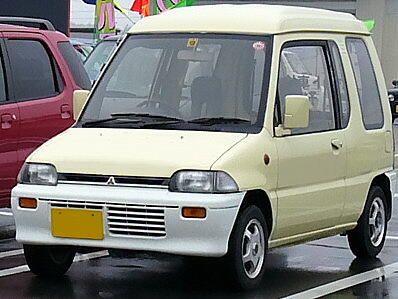
Mitsubishi Minica Toppo

== Seventh generation ==
Mitsubishi Minica
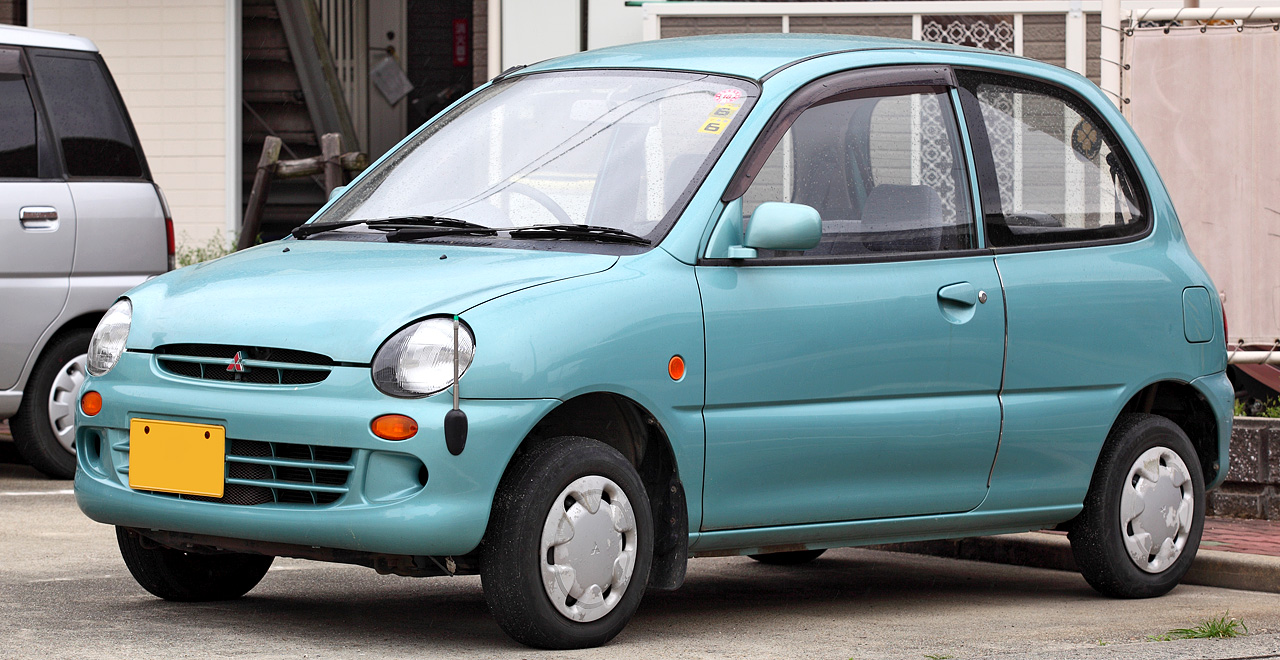

Overview
- Production: 1993–1998

Body and chassis
- Layout: Front-engine, front-wheel-drive; Front-engine, four-wheel-drive

Powertrain
- Engine: 657 cc 3G83 I3; 659 cc 4A30 16V I4; 659 cc 4A30 DOHC 20V turbo I4
- Transmission: 4MT/5MT/3AT/4AT

Dimensions
- Wheelbase: 2,280 mm (89.8 in)
- Length: 3,295 mm (129.7 in)
- Width: 1,395 mm (54.9 in)
- Height: 1,475–1,505 mm (58.1–59.3 in)
- Curb weight: 590–780 kg (1,300–1,720 lb)

In September 1993, the seventh-generation three- and five-door Minica and Minica Toppo were introduced, with longer wheelbase. The five-valve-per-cylinder three-cylinder engines were replaced with a pair of 659 cc four-cylinder engines; one normally aspirated with single overhead cam and four valves per cylinder, and one turbocharged with double overhead cam and five valves per cylinder. The Toppo continued to use the rear bodywork of the original Minica Toppo, combined with the new front-end design. A version of the Toppo with two doors on the passenger side, similar to the "Lettuce", was made available, along with a limited edition RV version.

In January 1997, versions of the Minica and Toppo with retro-styled front ends were introduced as the "Town Bee" model.

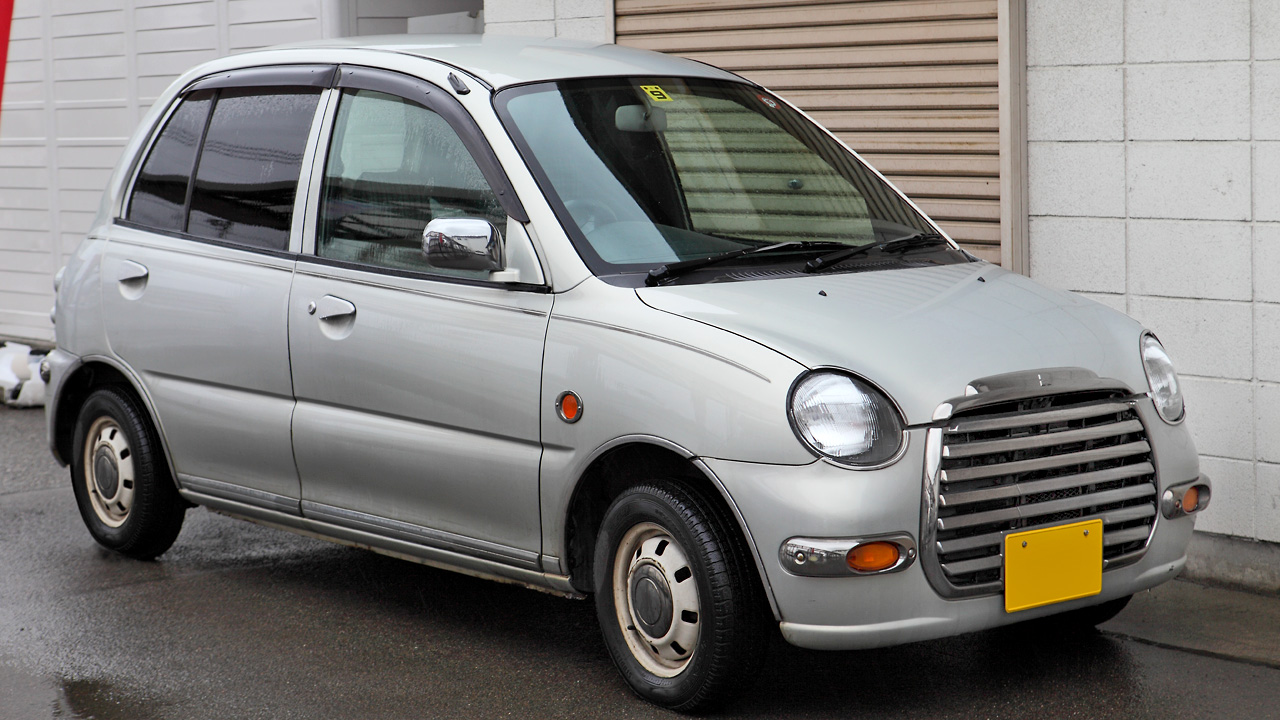
Mitsubishi Minica Town Bee

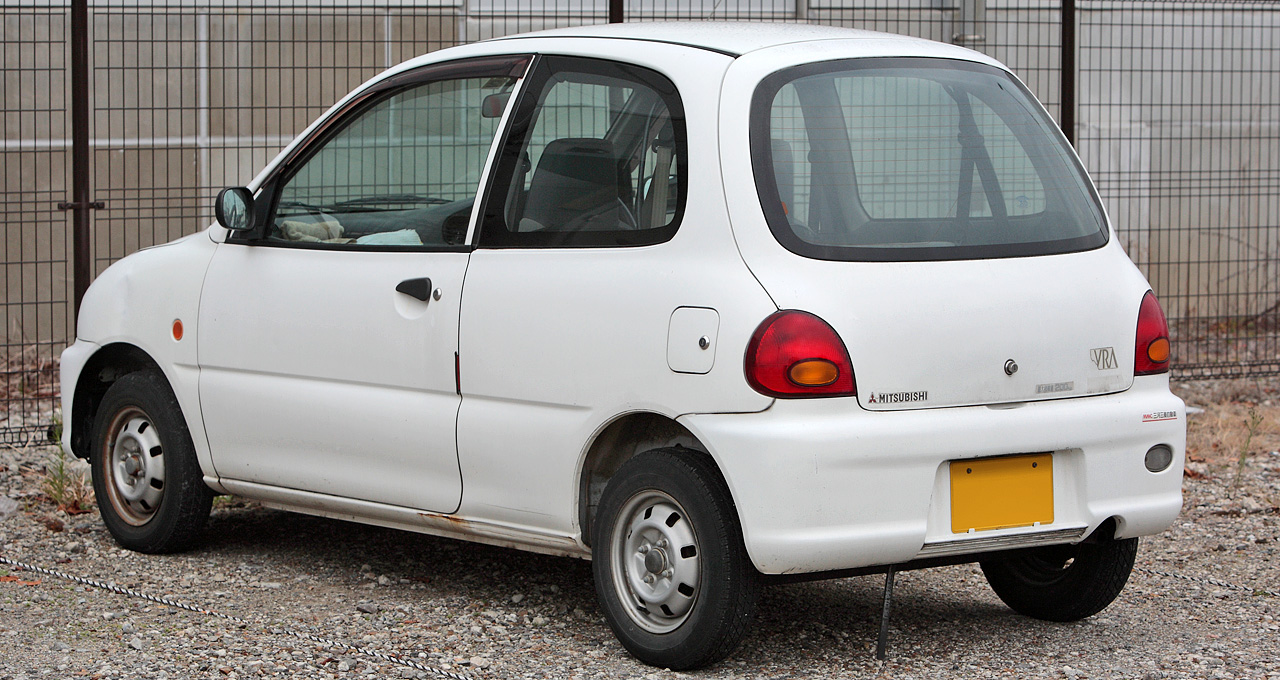
Mitsubishi Minica Van Lyra

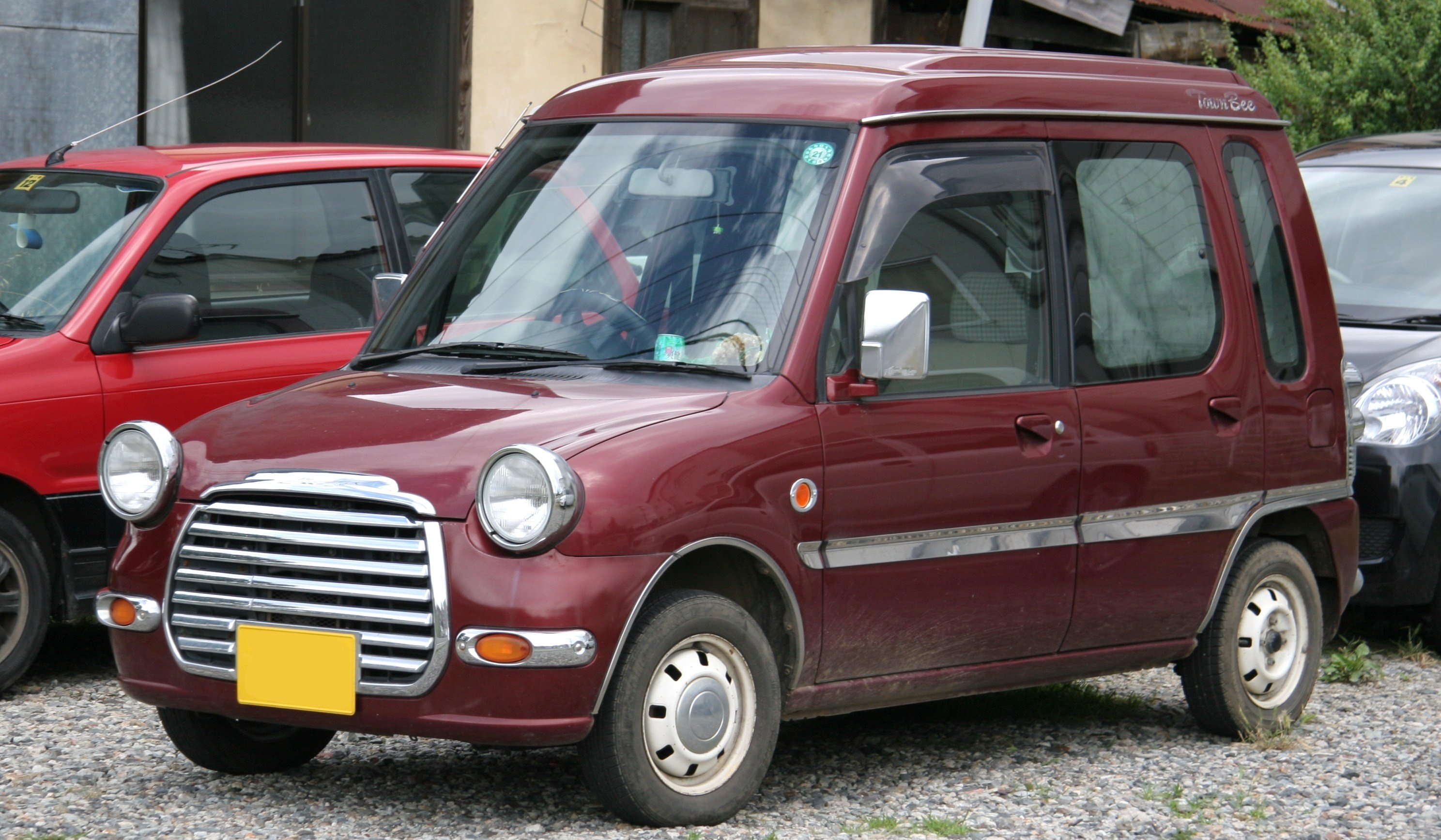
The retro-styled Minica Toppo Town Bee

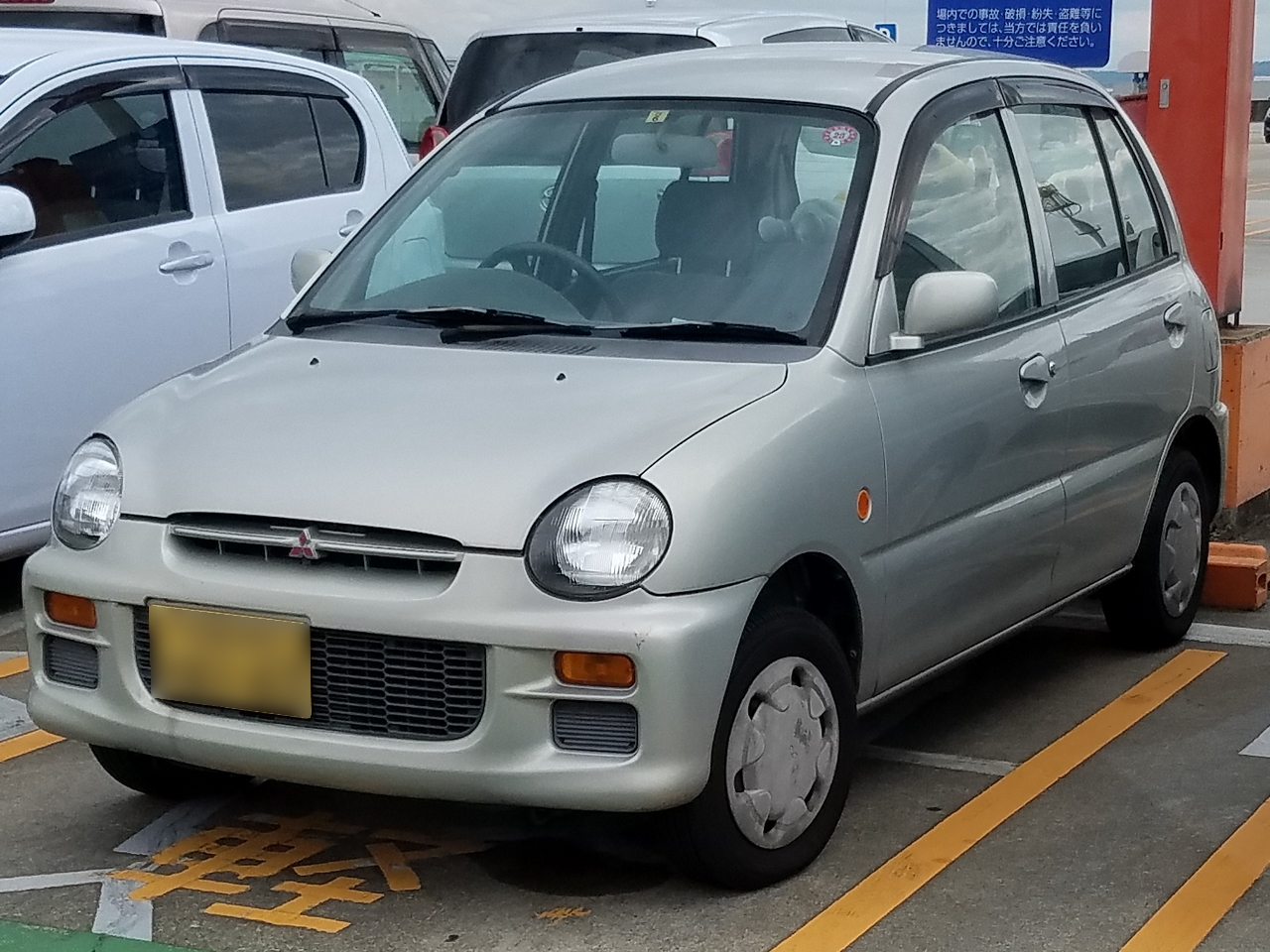
1995 Mitsubishi Minica PJ

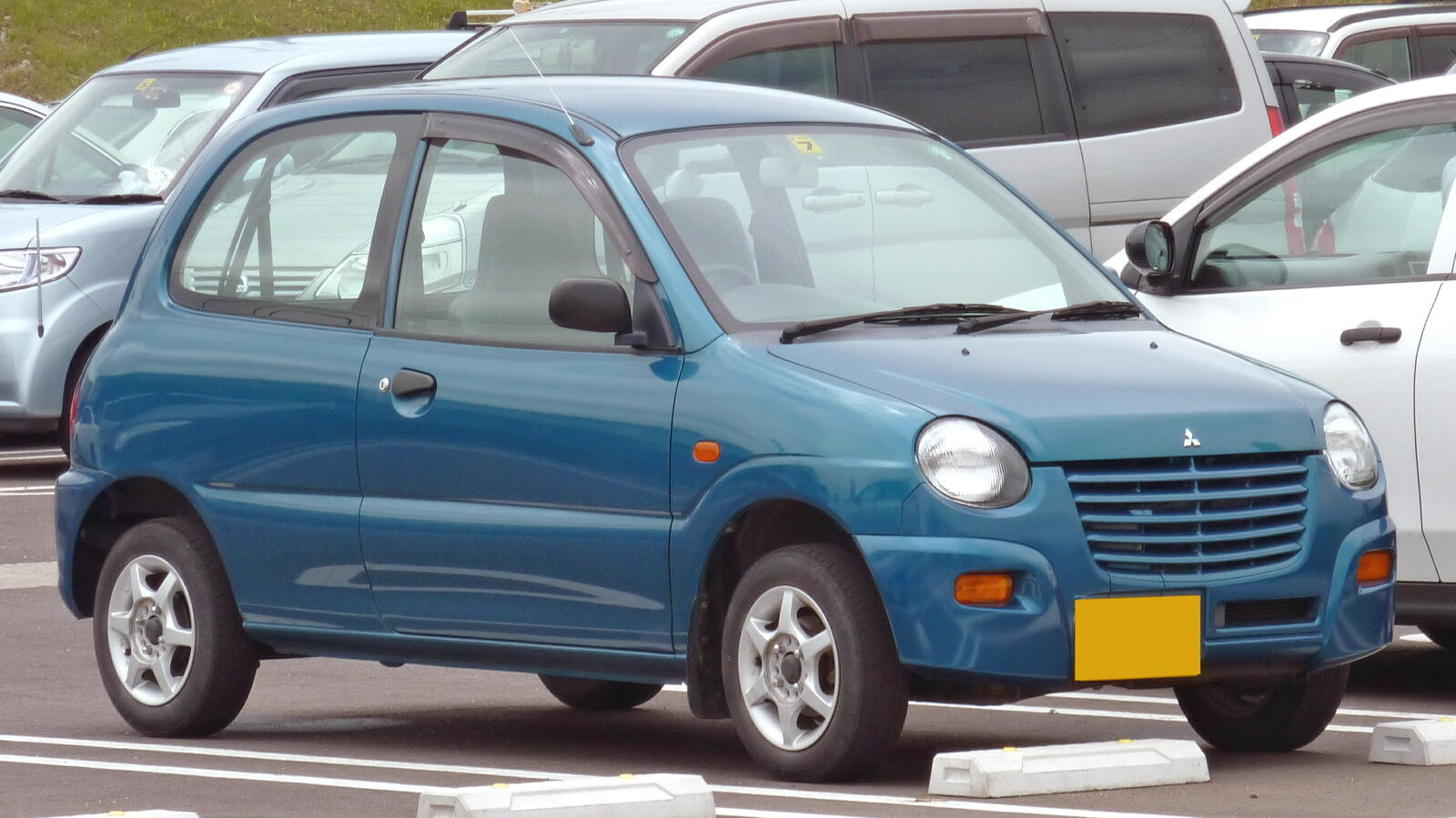
1995 Minica Van

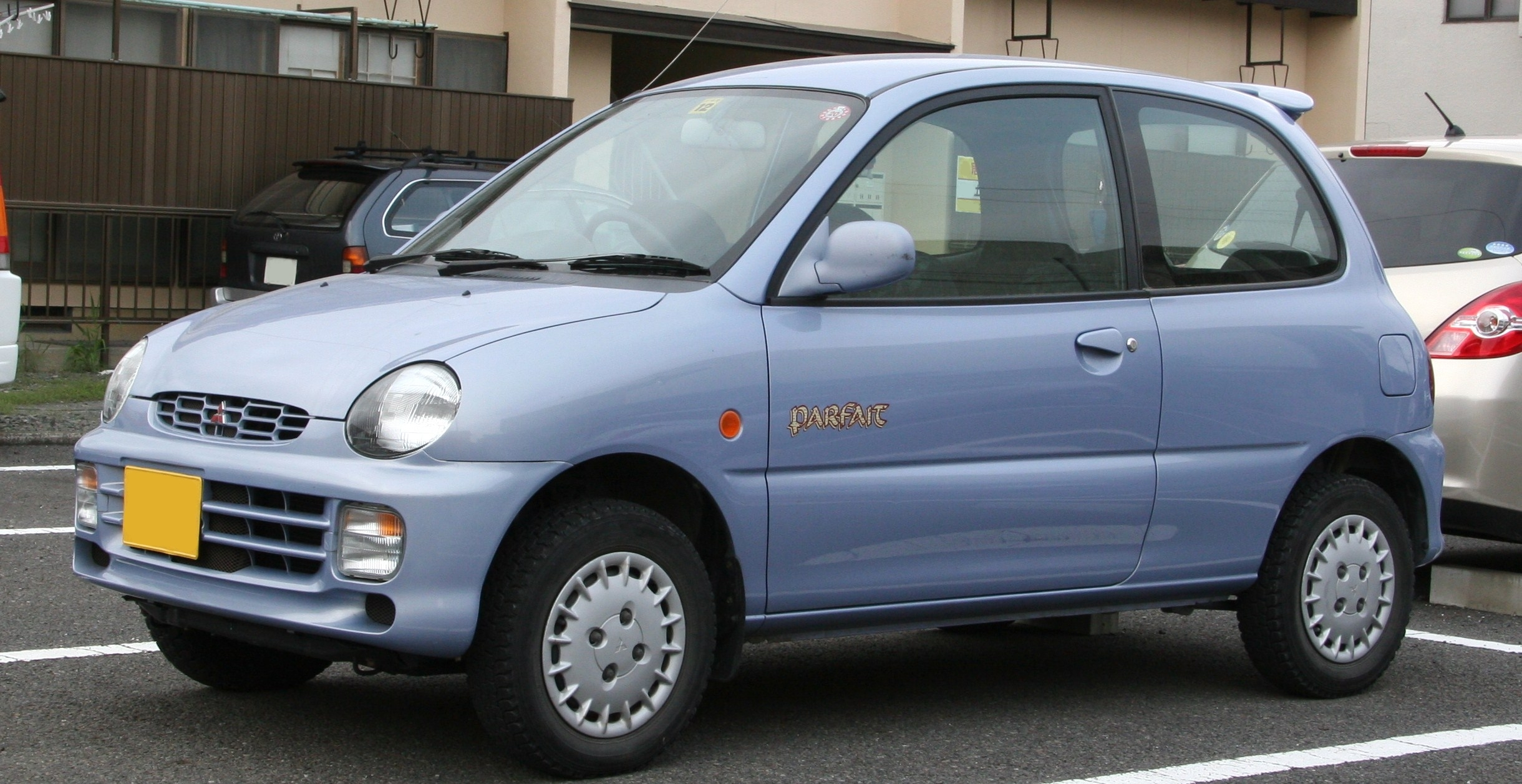
1997 Minica Parfait, featuring honeycomb grille

== Eighth generation ==
H42/H47
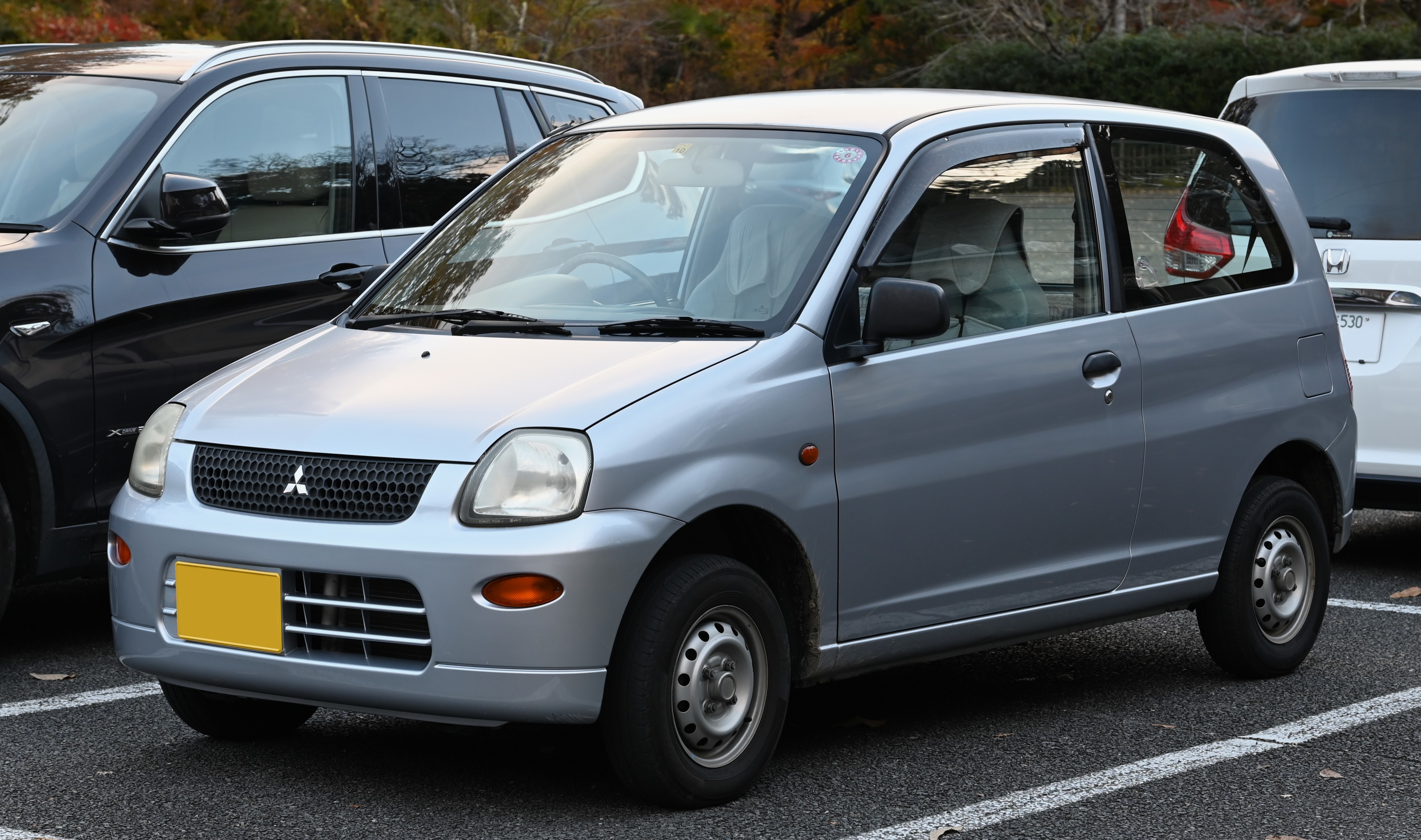
- 2006-2011 Mitsubishi Minica Van (facelift)

Overview
- Production: 1998–2007 (passenger models); 1998–2011 (commercial models)

Body and chassis
- Layout: Front-engine, front-wheel-drive; Front-engine, four-wheel-drive
- Related: Mitsubishi Pistachio

Powertrain
- Engine: 657 cc 3G83 I3
- Transmission: 4MT/5MT/3AT/4AT

Dimensions
- Wheelbase: 2,340 mm (92.1 in)
- Length: 3,395 mm (133.7 in)
- Width: 1,395 mm (54.9 in)
- Height: 1,475–1,510 mm (58.1–59.4 in)
- Curb weight: 680–790 kg (1,500–1,740 lb)

The enlarged eighth-generation Minica was introduced in October 1998 to take advantage of the new regulations, as a pair of three-door and five-door sedans with torsion beam rear suspension and optional four-wheel drive, with the only available engine the 657 cc three-cylinder single overhead cam unit, now equipped with four valves per cylinder. A lean-burn variant, using Mitsubishi's "Vertical Vortex" system, lowered fuel economy and CO_{2} emissions by about 10 percent even though the new model was somewhat heavier.

A five-door MPV built on this platform but with a four-cylinder double overhead cam five-valve-per-cylinder turbocharged engine, known as the "Mitsubishi Toppo BJ" was also introduced. Front-wheel-drive models carry the H42 chassis code, four-wheel-drives are H47. This is followed by an "A" for passenger models and a "V" for commercials. This generation was exported in small numbers as the Mitsubishi Minica Towny, being sold in Singapore, Hong Kong, and some Caribbean markets.

In January 1999, the retrostyled Town Bee version of this generation of Minica and the "Mitsubishi Toppo BJ Wide" were introduced. In October 1999, a 659 cc four-cylinder single overhead cam four-valve-per-cylinder turbocharged engine was introduced, and in December 1999, a limited edition of 50 "Mitsubishi Pistachios" with a 1094 cc double overhead cam four-valve-per-cylinder direct-injection engine was made available only to organizations working to protect the environment. In October 2001, a five-door wagon version of the Minica was introduced as the Mitsubishi eK Wagon, and now serves as Mitsubishi's primary product in the "kei" class. Passenger versions were discontinued in 2007, while the models intended for commercial use continued to be built until 2011.

The Mitsubishi eK is a kei-car which is the direct successor of the Minica.

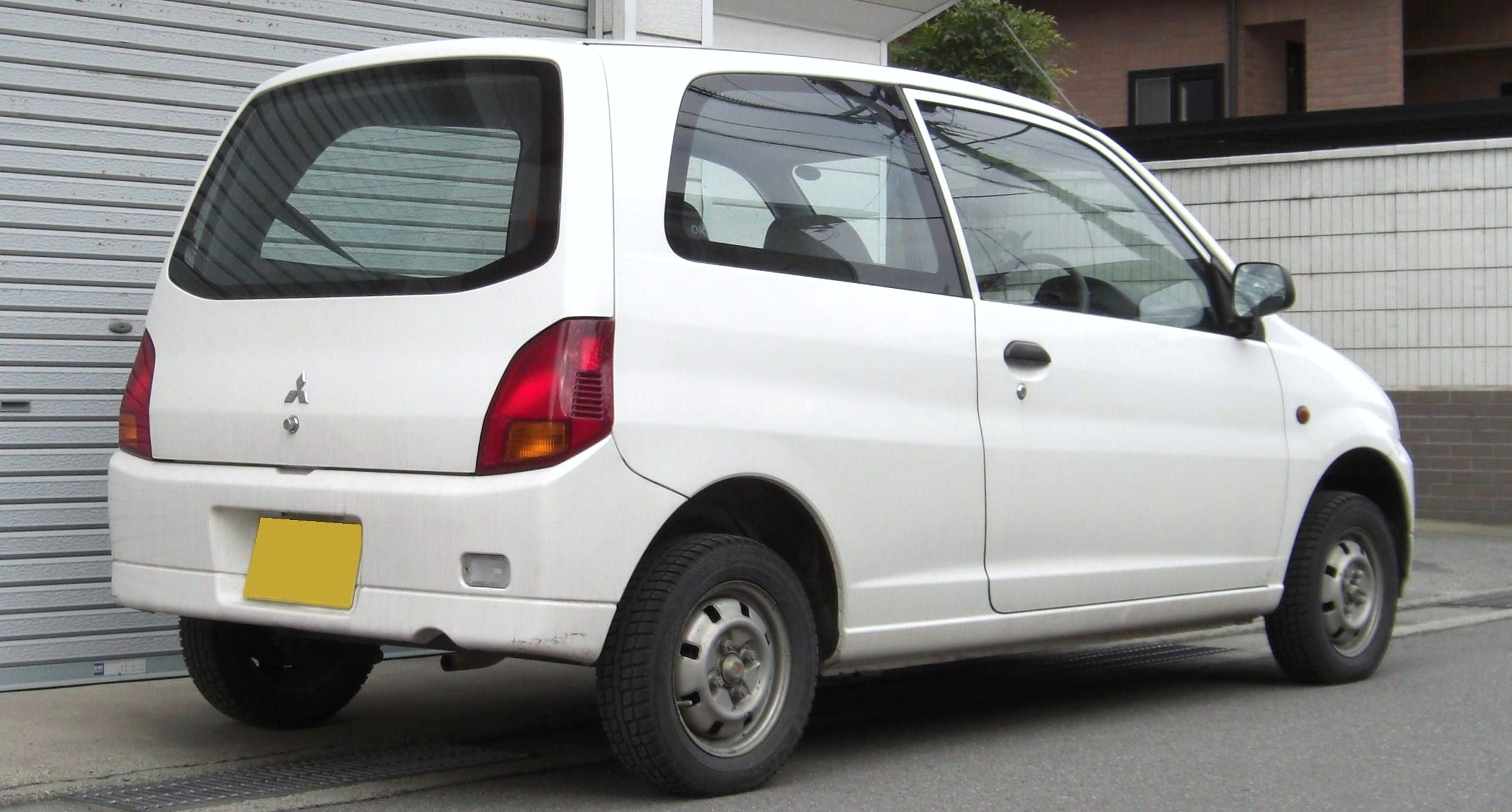
Rear view

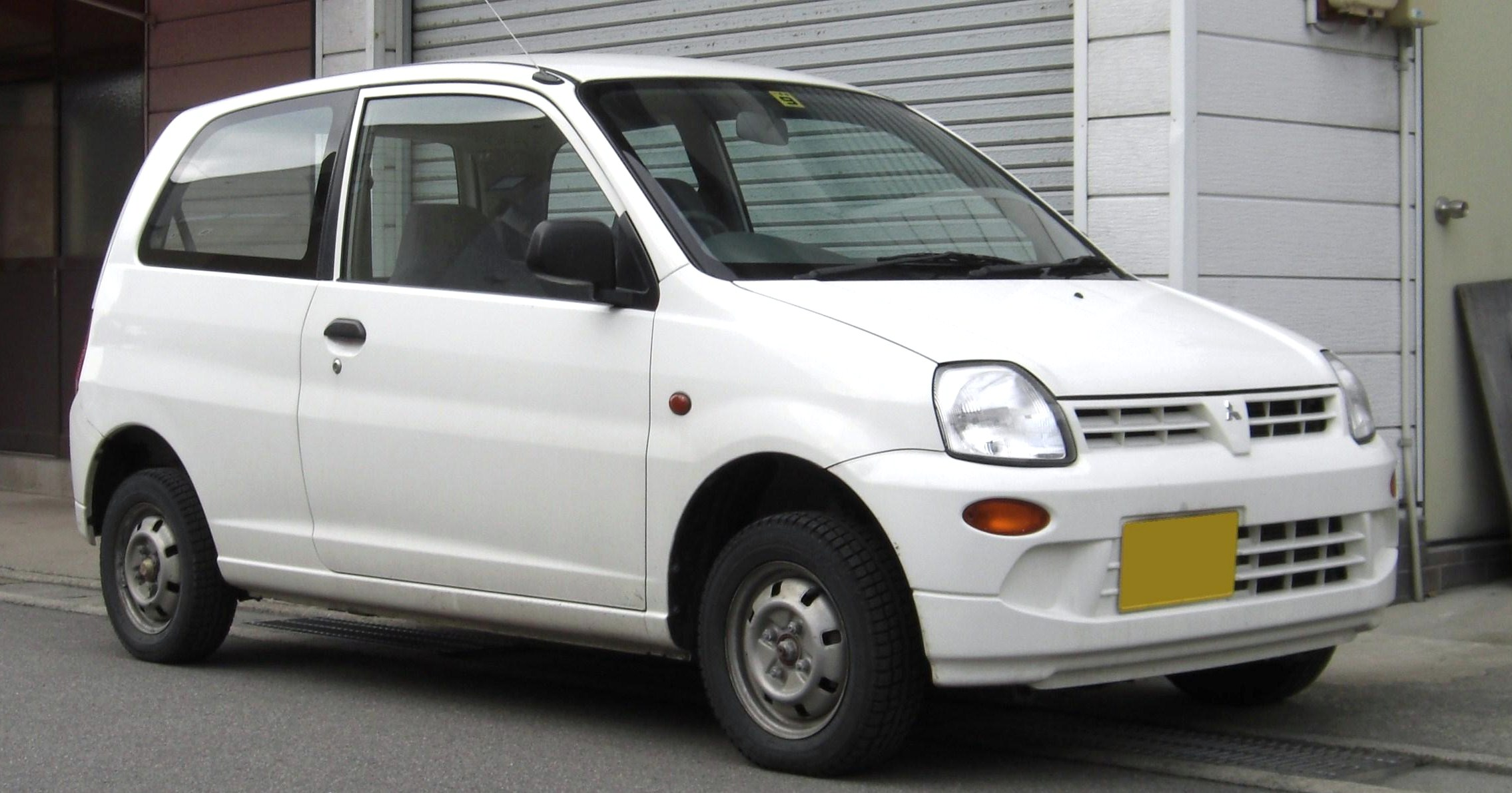
Pre-facelift Mitsubishi Minica 3-door

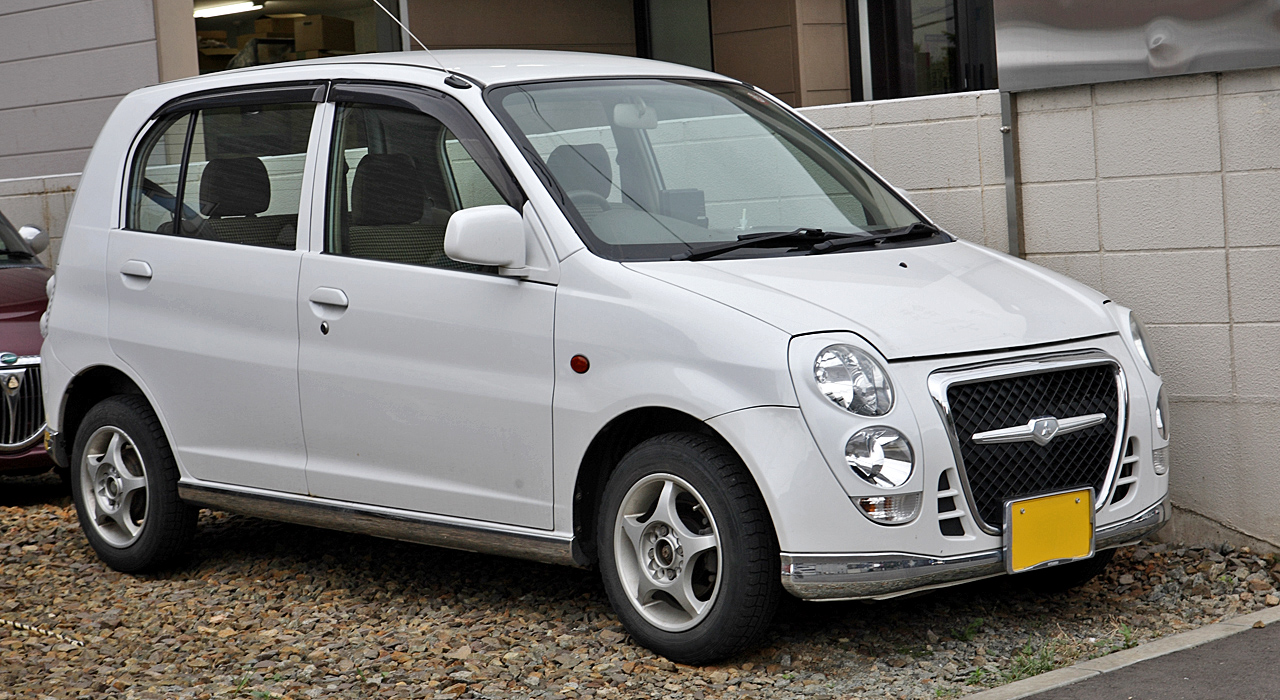
Mitsubishi Minica Town Bee

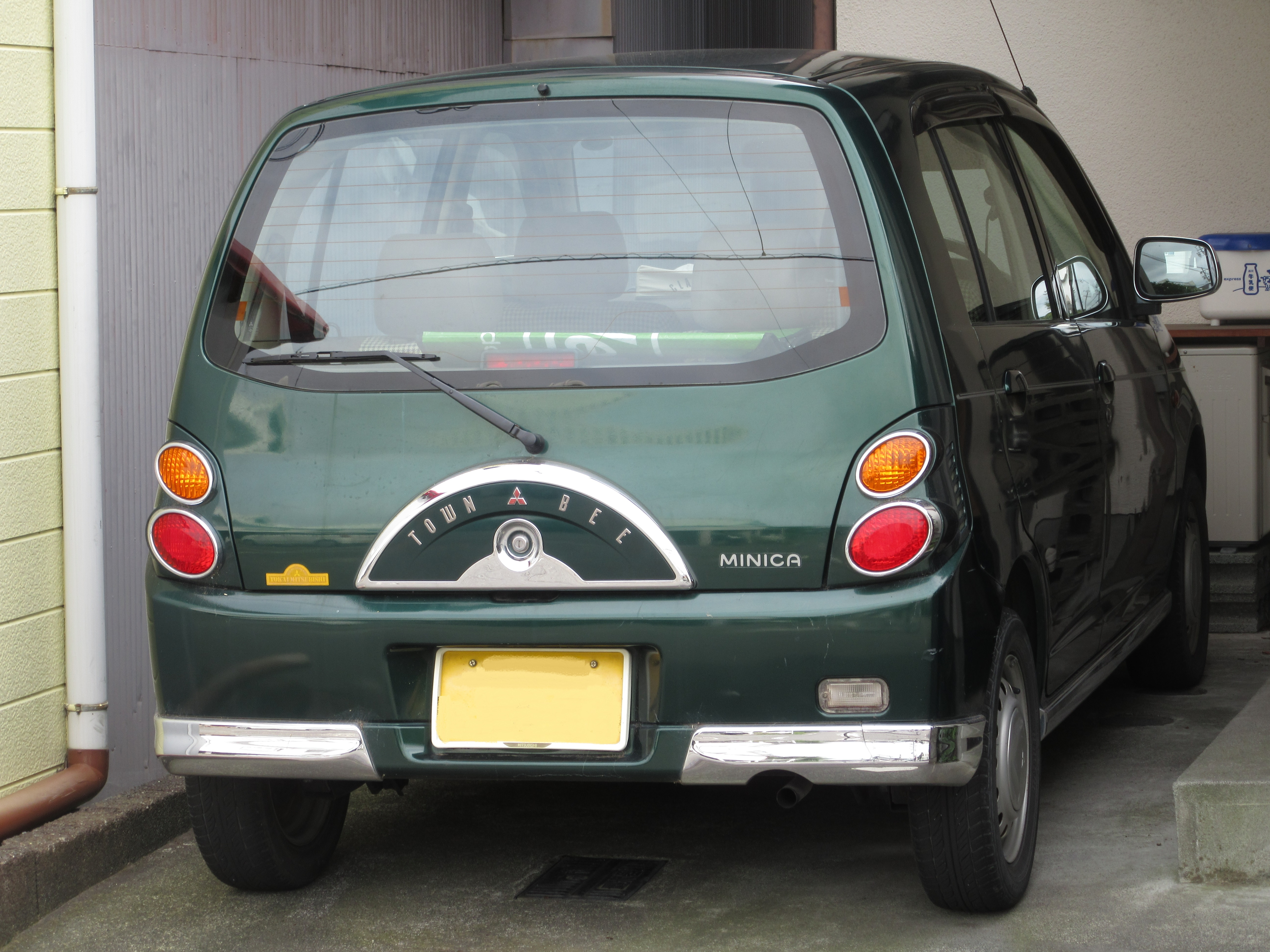
Minica Town Bee rear view

== Legacy ==
- The Filipino tongue twister Minekaniko ng mekaniko ni Monico ang makina ng Minica ni Monica (lit. "Monico's mechanic fixed the engine of Monica's Minica") refers to the Minica, which gained popularity in the Philippines during the Marcos dictatorship.
