= Mitsubishi Motors concept cars =

Prototype Mitsubishi automobiles

Mitsubishi Motors concepts are the prototype and concept cars exhibited around the world by Mitsubishi Motors. In common with other automakers, Mitsubishi has used concept cars as both show cars—stylistically adventurous motor show exhibits with no production intentions behind them—or as precursors of future models destined for mass production.

The first Mitsubishi concept car was a two-seat convertible version of the Colt 600, which was introduced at the 9th Tokyo Motor Show in 1962 by Shin Mitsubishi Heavy-Industries, one of the companies which would combine to form Mitsubishi Motors in 1970. Although the company had no intention of marketing it, the convertible helped attract the public's attention to the more mundane sedan.

Mitsubishi has presented its heritage in its motor show exhibits, using vehicles from its past displayed in parallel with new model introductions. The Colt 600 convertible was brought out from the Mitsubishi Museum in 2005, alongside the new cabriolet version of the Mitsubishi Colt which debuted at the 75th Geneva Motor Show. The following year they revisited the theme by promoting the newest version of their Mitsubishi Pajero sport utility vehicle alongside a 1934 Mitsubishi PX33, a pre-World War II military prototype which was the first Japanese sedan equipped with four-wheel drive. They took the same approach a third time in 2007, with the tenth iteration of the rallying-derived Mitsubishi Lancer Evolution. It was exhibited at the North American International Auto Show in 2007 alongside the Mitsubishi Lancer 1600 GSR, which gained renown after winning the Safari Rally in 1974.

== List of Mitsubishi concepts and prototypes ==
Automobile	Debut	Year	Description	Image
PX33		1934–37	A prototype passenger car commissioned for military use by the Japanese government. It was the first Japanese-built sedan to have full-time four-wheel drive.	
Colt 600	9th Tokyo Motor Show (Tokyo, Japan)	1962	A two-seat convertible show car exhibited to attract attention to the new Colt 600 sedan. Never intended for production.	
Pajero I	20th Tokyo Motor Show (Tokyo, Japan)	1973	An off-road SUV concept based on the Mitsubishi Jeep.	
SSW	23rd Tokyo Motor Show (Tokyo, Japan)	1979	A prototype people carrier which became the Mitsubishi Chariot.	
Pajero II	23rd Tokyo Motor Show (Tokyo, Japan)	1979	An off-road SUV concept. A precursor to the production Mitsubishi Pajero.	
MP-90X	26th Tokyo Motor Show (Tokyo, Japan)	1985	A streamlined sports car with an advanced navigation and telecommunications system.	
HSR	27th–32nd Tokyo Motor Shows (Tokyo, Japan)	1987–97	An abbreviation of Highly Sophisticated-transport Research, the HSR was a series of concept sports cars exhibited at consecutive Tokyo Motor Shows from 1987 to 1997, typically showcasing the company's engineering technologies.	
X2S	Chicago Auto Show	1988	Two-seat sports car concept.	
HSX	28th Tokyo Motor Show (Tokyo, Japan)	1989	Based on the mechanicals of the HSR-II, the HSX was a near production-ready version of the 1990 Mitsubishi GTO.	
RVR	28th Tokyo Motor Show (Tokyo, Japan)	1989	An off-road concept.	
mR. 1000	29th Tokyo Motor Show (Tokyo, Japan)	1991	One of a pair of complementary "his-and-hers" urban commuter cars alongside the mS. 1000, weighing about 650 kilograms (1,430 lb) and powered by a one-litre aluminium engine. Although the two varied in styling and some technology, both followed the then-current Japanese fashion for retro design.	
mS. 1000	29th Tokyo Motor Show (Tokyo, Japan)	1991	One of a pair of complementary "his-and-hers" urban commuter cars alongside the mR. 1000, weighing about 650 kilograms (1,430 lb) and powered by a one-litre aluminium engine. Although the two varied in styling and some technology, both followed the then-current Japanese fashion for retro design.	
Libero EV		1993–96	One of Mitsubishi's first complete alternative propulsion-based prototypes; 36 wagons were manufactured and sold to power companies for evaluation during the 1990s.	
ESR	30th Tokyo Motor Show (Tokyo, Japan)	1993	An abbreviation of Ecological Science Research, the ESR was a hybrid electric vehicle concept.	
Field Guard	30th Tokyo Motor Show (Tokyo, Japan)	1993	An off-road vehicle styling exercise based on the Pajero.	
Lynx	30th Tokyo Motor Show (Tokyo, Japan)	1993	An off-road kei car.	
MUM 500	30th Tokyo Motor Show (Tokyo, Japan)	1993	A two-seater kei car.	
Gaus	31st Tokyo Motor Show (Tokyo, Japan)	1995	A prototype sport utility vehicle.	
Maus	31st Tokyo Motor Show (Tokyo, Japan)	1995	A two-seater microcar concept.	
Zaus	31st Tokyo Motor Show (Tokyo, Japan)	1995	An off-road concept based on the Pajero.	
Technas	57th Frankfurt Motor Show (Frankfurt, Germany)	1997	A Sport utility vehicle later exhibited as the TETRA.	
TETRA	32nd Tokyo Motor Show (Tokyo, Japan)	1997	A Sport utility vehicle first exhibited as the Technas.	
MAIA	32nd Tokyo Motor Show (Tokyo, Japan)	1997	An abbreviation of Mini Advanced & Ideal Archetype, the MAIA is an evolution of the earlier Mitsubishi Maus microcar concept.	
SST	North American International Auto Show (Detroit, Michigan, United States)	1998	The first concept vehicle exhibited by the company in the United States, the SST sports car was the precursor of the third generation Mitsubishi Eclipse.	
SSU	North American International Auto Show (Detroit, Michigan, USA)	1999	The precursor of the Mitsubishi Endeavor sport utility vehicle.	
SUW	Frankfurt, Tokyo Motor Shows (Frankfurt, Germany, and Tokyo, Japan)	1999	A series of prototypes sharing certain common themes, specifically a GDI engine and increased interior space through the use of an unusually high roofline.	
FTO EV		1999	A BEV-powered version of the FTO sports car, which broke the world record for the most distance covered by an electric vehicle in 24 hours.	
SSS	North American International Auto Show (Detroit, Michigan, USA)	2000	The precursor of the ninth generation of the Mitsubishi Galant.	
ASX	North American International Auto Show (Detroit, Michigan, USA)	2001	One of a pair of complementary prototype crossover SUVs, alongside the RPM 7000. The ASX presaged the first Airtrek/Outlander, which was released in Japan later the same year, while the more radical RPM 7000 was a styling exercise unconstrained by the demands of mass production.	
RPM 7000	North American International Auto Show (Detroit, Michigan, USA)	2001	One of a pair of complementary prototype crossover SUVs, alongside the ASX. The RPM 7000 was a styling exercise unconstrained by the demands of mass production, while the less radical ASX presaged the first Airtrek/Outlander which was released in Japan later the same year. while the more radical	
CZ2	35th Tokyo Motor Show (Tokyo, Japan)	2001	Prototype urban car which presaged the next generation of Mitsubishi Colt.	
CZ3 Tarmac	35th Tokyo Motor Show (Tokyo, Japan)	2001	A larger version of the CZ2, sharing the same platform but with more interior space and a larger engine. It was also a possible replacement for the Mitsubishi Lancer Evolution as the company's vehicle in the World Rally Championship.	
Space Liner	35th Tokyo Motor Show (Tokyo, Japan)	2001	A concept multi-purpose vehicle which later became the Mitsubishi Grandis.	
SUP	35th Tokyo Motor Show (Tokyo, Japan)	2001	A Compact SUV styling exercise, designed soon after the arrival of stylist Olivier Boulay to Mitsubishi, and which helped introduce his vision of the company's "corporate face" on their future vehicles.	
Eclipse EV	Shikoku EV Rally, Shikoku, Japan	2001	Part of Mitsubishi's research into alternative propulsion, a Mitsubishi Eclipse fitted with lithium ion batteries and a permanent magnetic synchronous motor.	
Pajero Evo 2+2	58th Frankfurt Motor Show (Frankfurt, Germany)	2001	A prototype of the racing car developed for Dakar Rally in 2003 following the introduction of new Super Production rules.	
FCV	Japan Hydrogen & Fuel Cell (JHFC) Demonstration Project	2003	A Grandis-based fuel cell vehicle to participate in the JHFC Project in 2003, developed in partnership with DaimlerChrysler, the then-controlling shareholder of Mitsubishi Motors.	
Tarmac Spyder	North American International Auto Show (Detroit, Michigan, USA)	2003	A convertible version of the CZ3 Tarmac concept.	
"i" Concept	60th Frankfurt Motor Show (Frankfurt, Germany)	2003	A prototype kei car which later became the Mitsubishi i.	
CZ2 cabriolet	73rd Geneva Motor Show (Geneva, Switzerland)	2003	An open-topped version of the earlier CZ2 prototype.	
Se-Ro	37th Tokyo Motor Show (Tokyo, Japan)	2003	An aluminium-bodied styling exercise based on the mechanical underpinnings of the Mitsubishi i prior to its release. It followed a classical aeronautical theme, with its name alluding to the Mitsubishi Zero fighter aircraft of World War II, and its bodywork resembling an airship.	
Eclipse Concept-E	North American International Auto Show (Detroit, Michigan, USA)	2004	A concept car previewing the next generation of the Mitsubishi Eclipse which was released in 2005.	
Sport Truck Concept	North American International Auto Show (Detroit, Michigan, USA)	2004	A mid-size prototype pickup truck intended to promote the announcement of the Mitsubishi Raider, although the concept truck shared no styling or mechanical components with the production vehicle.	
Goku Shin Ka ("The Ultimate Evolution")	Los Angeles Auto Show (Los Angeles, California, USA)	2005	A combined sports car, convertible, pickup truck, and SUV. The featured vehicle in a comic book created for the 2005 Los Angeles Auto Show by staff at Mitsubishi Motors North America's Californian design studio.	
Nessie	75th Geneva Motor Show (Geneva, Switzerland)	2005	A hydrogen-powered sport utility vehicle concept co-designed with Italian engineering firm Italdesign Giugiaro and German industrial gases company The Linde Group.	
Concept-Sportback	61st Frankfurt Motor Show (Frankfurt, Germany)	2005	The precursor of the hatchback version of the Mitsubishi Lancer, being introduced to the European market in 2008.	
Colt EV		2005	A concept car using the company's MIEV in-wheel motor technology; the first car so equipped which was mooted for mass production and sale.	
Concept D-5	39th Tokyo Motor Show; Tokyo, Japan	2005	A pre-production version of the fifth generation of the Mitsubishi Delica multi-purpose vehicle.	
Concept-X	39th Tokyo Motor Show (Tokyo, Japan)	2005	A prototype of the tenth generation of the Mitsubishi Lancer Evolution.	
Concept-CT MIEV	North American International Auto Show (Detroit, Michigan, USA)	2006	A hybrid electric prototype based on the mid-engine, rear-wheel drive platform of the Mitsubishi i kei car.	
Concept-EZ MIEV	76th Geneva Motor Show (Geneva, Switzerland)	2006	A compact monobox design, created to demonstrate the benefits of the company's MIEV in-wheel motor technology in giving greater interior space.	
Concept-cX	62nd Frankfurt Motor Show (Frankfurt, Germany)	2007	A mini SUV designed to promote Mitsubishi's environmental credentials; the car used a clean-burning diesel engine which passed strict future emissions requirements, and featured an interior constructed largely from plant-based resins.	
Evolander	SEMA Show (Las Vegas, Nevada)	2007	A high performance version of the Mitsubishi Outlander.	
i MiEV Sport	40th Tokyo Motor Show (Tokyo, Japan)	2007	A kei-class fastback using the Mitsubishi i platform and the company's MIEV alternative propulsion system.	
Concept-ZT	40th Tokyo Motor Show (Tokyo, Japan)	2007	A sedan developed as a potential next-generation model of the Mitsubishi Galant and the Galant-based Mitsubishi 380 in Australia., which were later canceled.	
Concept-RA	North American International Auto Show (Detroit, Michigan, USA)	2008	A sports coupe developed as a potential next-generation model of the Mitsubishi Eclipse, which was later canceled.	
Prototype-S	78th Geneva Motor Show (Geneva, Switzerland)	2008	A development of the Mitsubishi Concept-Sportback, the Prototype-S was the pre-production version of the Ralliart version of the 2008 Mitsubishi Lancer hatchback.	
Concept PX-MiEV	Tokyo Motor Show; LA Auto Show (NA debut)	2009	A plug-in hybrid SUV. Previewed the styling of the third-generation Mitsubishi Outlander.	
Concept Global Small	Geneva Motor Show	2011	A next-gen B-segment hatchback. Previewed the sixth-generation Mitsubishi Mirage (previously known as the Colt).	
MiEV Evolution; MiEV Evolution II; MiEV Evolution III		2012; 2013; 2014	A series of electric race cars made for the Pikes Peak International Hill Climb.	
Concept G4	Bangkok Motor Show	2013	A small sedan which previewed the Mitsubishi Mirage G4 (aka Mitsubishi Attrage).	
Concept GC-PHEV	Tokyo Motor Show; Chicago Auto Show (NA debut, 2015)	2013	A full-size plug-in hybrid SUV. Some styling cues were later seen in the third generation Montero Sport/Pajero Sport.	
Concept XR-PHEV	Tokyo Motor Show; LA Auto Show (NA debut, 2014)	2013	A compact crossover SUV with sporty styling. A precursor to the Mitsubishi Eclipse Cross.	
Concept GR-HEV	Geneva Motor Show; Bangkok Motor Show	2013	A diesel-hybrid sport-utility truck. Previewed the styling of the fifth-generation, four-door Mitsubishi Triton and Fiat Fullback.	
Concept CA-MiEV	Geneva Motor Show	2013	An electric car concept made as a larger, potential successor to the i-MiEV.	
Concept AR	Tokyo Motor Show	2013	A next-generation compact MPV.	
Concept XR-PHEV Evolution		2014	A two-door rally racer made for the Vision Gran Turismo series of Gran Turismo 6.	
Concept XR-PHEV II	Geneva Motor Show	2015	Successor to the 2013 Concept XR-PHEV, closer to the production Eclipse Cross and now dubbed an "urban crossover".	
eX Concept	Tokyo Motor Show; LA Auto Show (NA debut, 2016)	2015	An electric compact SUV. The front end previewed the styling of the Mitsubishi Eclipse Cross.	
GT-PHEV Concept	Paris Motor Show	2016	A plug-in hybrid "grand tourer" crossover SUV. First preview of the fourth-generation Mitsubishi Outlander.	
XM Concept	GAIKINDO Indonesia International Auto Show	2016	A small crossover MPV with SUV-like features. Previewed the production Mitsubishi Xpander.	
e-Evolution Concept	Tokyo Motor Show; LA Auto Show (NA debut, 2018)	2017	An electric high-performance SUV.	
Re-Model A	Los Angeles Auto Show	2017	A 100th anniversary tribute to the Mitsubishi Model A built by West Coast Customs. The body is built on the chassis of the Outlander PHEV.	
Engelberg Tourer	Geneva Motor Show	2019	A plug-in hybrid SUV. Second preview of the fourth-generation Mitsubishi Outlander.	
MI-Tech Concept	Tokyo Motor Show	2019	A doorless, roofless buggy-type electric SUV.	
Super Height K-Wagon Concept	Tokyo Motor Show	2019	A tall Kei-class wagon. Previewed the production Mitsubishi eK X Space.	
Triton Absolute	Bangkok International Motor Show	2019	Mitsubishi first unveiled the Absolute Concept at the Bangkok Motor Show in March 2019, before taking the hardcore Triton on a tour of Australia to gauge consumer and dealer feedback to the truck.	
Shogun Sport / Pajero Sport SVP Concept	The Commercial Vehicle Show	2019	The Mitsubishi Pajero Sport SVP concept has been revealed in the UK overnight with Mitsubishi UK announcing the SVP Pack that will be available towards the end of the year.	
Delica D:5 Tough×Tough	Tokyo Auto Salon	2022	The Delica D:5 Tough x Tough is equipped with various aftermarket parts and Ralliart accessories to further emphasize the tough, off-road styling.	
K-EV concept X Style	Tokyo Auto Salon	2022	It's meant to preview a new generation of electric kei cars in Japan. Mitsubishi is light on details, but it does specify that this particular kei car is meant to be SUV-like in feel. It features a raised ride height, X-shaped logos all about and a copper roof meant to remind of the motor winding of an EV. Previewed the production Mitsubishi eK X EV.	
Vision Ralliart Concept	Tokyo Auto Salon	2022	Mitsubishi is using the Outlander PHEV as the basis of this concept, but it appears as though nothing has been done to the powertrain to make it any more potent than the standard car.	
Minicab MiEV B-Leisure Style	Tokyo Auto Salon	2022	The Minicab-MiEV B-Leisure Style is a kei-car class electric commercial vehicle that offers convenience from private to business use by serving as a source of power supply.	
XFC	Vietnam Motor Show	2022	The XFC is a concept crossover SUV first showcased in Vietnam in October 2022. Previewed the production Mitsubishi Xforce.	
XRT	Bangkok International Motor Show	2023	The XRT is a concept and Prototype of mid-size prototype pickup truck first showcased in Thailand in March 2023. Previewed the Sixth generation Mitsubishi Triton.	
D:X	Japan Mobility Show	2023	The D:X is a concept MPV first showcased in Japan in October 2023.	
DST	Philippine International Motor Show	2024	The DST is a 7-passenger concept crossover SUV first showcased in the Philippines in October 2024. This previewed the production of the Mitsubishi Destinator and later previewed the styling of the fifth-generation Mitsubishi Pajero.	
Elevance	Japan Mobility Show	2025	The Elevance is a plug-in hybrid concept Off-road SUV first showcased in Japan in October 2025.	
