= Nessi =

Nessi, or variants, may refer to:

== People with the surname ==
- Antonio Nessi (1834–1907), Italian engraver, painter and photographer
- Giuseppe Nessi (1887–1961), Italian opera singer
- Lino Nessi (1904–unknown), Paraguayan footballer
- Marzio Nessi (born 1957), Swiss experimental physicist

== Other uses ==
- NeSSI (New Sampling/Sensor Initiative), at the University of Washington
- New Mexico Exoplanet Spectroscopic Survey Instrument (NESSI)

== See also ==
- Nessie (disambiguation)
