= Tetra (disambiguation) =

Tetra is the name of many species of freshwater fish in the family Characidae from Africa, Central America and South America.

Tetra may also refer to:

== Arts and entertainment ==
- Tetra (album) (stylised as Tetr4), the first album from the French break-beat band C2C
- Tetra, an alias for Princess Zelda in The Legend of Zelda: The Wind Waker and The Legend of Zelda: Phantom Hourglass
- Tetra Galaxy, the fictional galaxy in the game Metroid Prime Hunters

== Businesses ==
- Tetra (company), a supplier of aquarium equipment and fish food
- Tetra Pak, a multinational food packaging and processing company of Swedish origin
- Tetra Tech, an environmental engineering and resource management firm

== Science and technology ==
- TETRA (Terrestrial Trunked Radio), a European standard for trunked radio networks
- Tetra (mite), a genus of mites in the family Eriophyidae
- Tetra (monkey), a rhesus macaque that was the first successfully birthed primate created via an artificial cloning technique
- Tetra (unit), a proposed unit of information by Donald Knuth denoting 32 bits
- Mitsubishi TETRA, a concept car first exhibited in 1997

== Other uses ==
- Tetra-, a numeral prefix for 4
  - Tetraphobia, the practice of avoiding instances of the digit 4
- Tetraplegia, shortened to tetra, dysfunction or loss of motor and/or sensory function of the spinal cord

== See also ==
- Humbert Tétras, a French ultralight aircraft
