= Mitsubishi 3B2 engine =

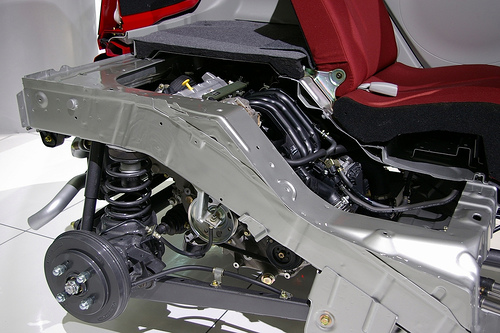

Overview
- Manufacturer: Mitsubishi Motors
- Production: 2005–2020

Layout
- Configuration: Three cylinder
- Displacement: 659 cc (0.7 L); 999 cc (1.0 L)
- Cylinder bore: 65.4 mm (2.57 in); 72 mm (2.83 in)
- Piston stroke: 65.4 mm (2.57 in); 81.8 mm (3.22 in)
- Cylinder block material: Aluminum die cast
- Cylinder head material: Aluminum die cast
- Valvetrain: Direct acting DOHC, 12 valves, intake continuously variable valve timing MIVEC
- Compression ratio: 8.8:1-10.8:1

Combustion
- Turbocharger: On 3B20T and 3B21T
- Fuel system: Fuel injection
- Fuel type: Gasoline
- Cooling system: Water-cooled

Output
- Power output: 38–50 kW (52–68 PS)
- Torque output: 57–95 N⋅m (42–70 lb⋅ft)

Dimensions
- Length: 286 mm (11.3 in)
- Height: 191 mm (7.5 in)
- Dry weight: 67 kg (148 lb)

Chronology
- Predecessor: Mitsubishi 3G8 engine
- Successor: NMKV BR06 engine

The Mitsubishi 3B2 engine is a family of all-alloy three cylinder engines developed by Mitsubishi Motors, first produced in December 2005 at the company's Mizushima powertrain facility in Kurashiki, Okayama, for introduction in their 2006 Mitsubishi i kei car. All engines developed within this family have aluminum cylinder block and head, double overhead camshafts, four valves per cylinder, and MIVEC continuous variable valve timing.

The 3B20 was designed with the "rear midship" layout in mind but is not limited to that. The basic dimensions chosen reduced the powerplant's height, the cylinder block's structure was simplified, a timing chain was adopted, modularized components were used for the oil and water pumps, engine mounts, and fuel system. The aluminum construction and lightweight parts and materials in the manifolds helped reduce the weight of the engine by 20 percent compared with its iron-block 3G83 predecessor, while gains were also seen in torque, fuel economy and emissions. Bore pitch is 80 mm.

The preliminary version of the 0.7 L (659 cc) engine was first seen in the "i" Concept test car introduced in 2003, and used Mitsubishi's Smart Idling system which turns off the engine automatically when the vehicle is stationary, and can restart it within 0.2 seconds. So equipped, Mitsubishi claimed the prototype was capable of fulfilling the "three litre initiative" for gasoline engines, meaning fuel consumption of no more than 3 L/100 km (94 mpg_{‑imp}; 78 mpg_{‑US}).

The larger 1.0 L (999 cc) capacity of the development engine was outside the limits of the kei class in Japan and was introduced in the second generation of the smart fortwo.

== Specifications ==
=== 3B20 ===
Production	2006-2013	2013 - 2020
Configuration	Three cylinder 45° inclined	Three cylinder upright
Valve Train	chain driven DOHC	
Aspiration	naturally aspirated	
Displacement	0.7 L (659 cc)	
Bore x stroke	65.4 mm × 65.4 mm (2.57 in × 2.57 in)	
Compression ratio	10.8:1	10.9:1 or 12:1
Fuel type	Regular unleaded gasoline	
Peak power	38 kW (52 PS) at 7000 rpm	36 kW (49 PS) at 6500 rpm
Peak torque	57 N⋅m (42 lb⋅ft) at 4000 rpm	56–59 N⋅m (41–44 lb⋅ft) at 5000-5500 rpm

Applications:

- 2006 - 2013 Mitsubishi i
- 2013 - 2019 Mitsubishi eK
- 2013 - 2019 Nissan Dayz
- 2014 - 2020 Mitsubishi eK Space
- 2014 - 2020 Nissan Dayz Roox

=== 3B20T ===
Production	2006-2013	2013 - 2020
Configuration	Three cylinder 45° inclined	Three cylinder upright
Valve Train	chain driven DOHC	
Aspiration	turbocharger and Intercooler	
Displacement	0.7 L (659 cc)	
Bore x stroke	65.4 mm × 65.4 mm (2.57 in × 2.57 in)	
Compression ratio	8.8:1	9.0:1
Fuel type	Regular unleaded gasoline	
Peak power	47 kW (64 PS) at 6000 rpm	47 kW (64 PS) at 6000 rpm
Peak torque	94 N⋅m (69 lb⋅ft) at 3000 rpm	100 N⋅m (74 lb⋅ft) at 3000 rpm

Applications:

- 2006 - 2013 Mitsubishi i
- 2013 - 2019 Mitsubishi eK
- 2013 - 2019 Nissan Dayz
- 2014 - 2020 Mitsubishi eK Space
- 2014 - 2020 Nissan Dayz Roox

=== 3B21 ===
This engine is also known as Mercedes-Benz M132 E10

Engine Type	3B21	3B21	3B21 (North America)
Configuration	Three cylinder, 45° inclined, DOHC		
Aspiration	naturally aspirated		
Displacement	1.0 L (999 cc)		
Bore x stroke	72 mm × 81.8 mm (2.83 in × 3.22 in)		
Compression ratio	10.0:1		
Fuel type	95 Octane		Premium unleaded gasoline
Peak power	45 kW (61 PS) at 5800 rpm	52 kW (71 PS) at 5800 rpm	50 kW (68 PS) at 6000 rpm
Peak torque	89 N⋅m (66 lb⋅ft) at 3000 rpm	92 N⋅m (68 lb⋅ft) at 4500 rpm	92 N⋅m (68 lb⋅ft) at 3000 rpm

Applications:

- 2007 - 2014 Smart Fortwo

=== 3B21T ===
This engine is also known as Mercedes-Benz M132 E10 AL

Engine Type	3B21T	3B21T (Brabus)	3B21T (Brabus)
Configuration	Three cylinder, DOHC		
Aspiration	turbocharger and Intercooler		
Displacement	1.0 L (999 cc)		
Bore x stroke	72 mm × 81.8 mm (2.83 in × 3.22 in)		
Peak power	62 kW (84 PS) at 5250 rpm	72 kW (98 PS) at 5500 rpm	75 kW (102 PS) at 6000 rpm
Peak torque	120 N⋅m (89 lb⋅ft) at 3250 rpm	140 N⋅m (103 lb⋅ft) at 3500 rpm	147 N⋅m (108 lb⋅ft) at 2500 - 3600 rpm

Applications:

- 2007 - 2014 Smart Fortwo

== See also ==
- List of Mitsubishi engines
