= SUW =

SuW or SUW may refer to:

- Mitsubishi SUW, a series of concept cars manufactured by Mitsubishi Motors
- Richard I. Bong Airport, Wisconsin, IATA and FAA LID code
- Surface warfare, one of the four divisions of naval warfare
- Sung Wong Toi station, Hong Kong, MTR station code
