= Loch Ness Monster (disambiguation) =

The Loch Ness Monster is a cryptid that reputedly inhabits the Loch Ness lake in Scotland.

Loch Ness Monster may also refer to:

- Alex Harvey Presents: The Loch Ness Monster, an album by Alex Harvey
- Loch Ness Monster (roller coaster), a roller coaster in Busch Gardens Williamsburg
- The Loch Ness Monster (wrestler), British professional wrestler
- Loch Ness monster surface, a surface in mathematics
- "Loch Ness Monster", a hockey segment by Glenn Healy

== See also ==
- Nessie (disambiguation)
