= NeSSI =

Global and open initiative sponsored by the Center for Process Analysis and Control

NeSSI (for New Sampling/Sensor Initiative) is a global and open initiative sponsored by the Center for Process Analysis and Control (CPAC) at the University of Washington, in Seattle.

The NeSSI initiative was begun to simplify the tasks and reduce the overall costs associated with engineering, installing, and maintaining chemical process analytical systems. Process analytical systems are commonly used by the chemical, oil refining and petrochemical industries to measure and control both chemical composition as well as certain intrinsic physical properties (such as viscosity). The specific objectives of NeSSI are:

1. Increasing the reliability of these systems through the use of increased automation,
2. Shrinking their physical size and energy use by means of miniaturization,
3. Promoting the creation and use of industry standards for process analytical systems,
4. Helping create the infrastructure needed to support the use of the emerging class of robust and selective microAnalytical sensors.

To date, NeSSI has served as a forum for the adoption and improvement of an industrial standard which specifies the use of miniature and modular Lego-like flow components. NeSSI has also issued a specification which has been instrumental in spurring the development and commercialization of a plug and play low power communication bus (NeSSI-bus) specifically designed for use with process analytical sample systems in electrically hazardous environments. As part of its development road map, NeSSI has defined the electrical and mechanical interfaces, as well as compiled a list of automated (smart) software features, which are now beginning to be used by microanalytical manufacturers for industrial applications.

== Background ==
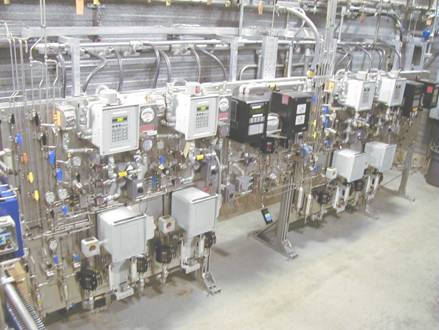
Conventional sample system in an analyzer house ca. 2006

Modern chemical and petrochemical processing plants are complex systems containing many steps (often called unit operations) involved in producing one or more products from various raw materials. In order to control the many processes, for both improved product quality and operational safety, many measurements are made at the different stages of processing. These measurements, either from simple sensors (such as temperature, pressure, flow, etc.) or from sophisticated chemical analyzers (providing composition of one or more components in the chemical stream), are typically used as inputs to process control algorithms to give a "snapshot" of the process operation and to control the process to ensure it is operating efficiently and safely.

Traditionally, most of the measurements (with the exception of temperature, pressure and flow) were performed "off-line" by taking a sample from the process and analyzing it in the laboratory. Beginning in the latter of part of the 1930s, a trend aimed at moving the analysis from the laboratory to the process plant began. With the advent of more sophisticated analyzers, this concept known as Process Analytics become much more prevalent in the 1980s and a new discipline called Process Analytical Chemistry (PAC) emerged which combined chemical engineering and analytical chemistry.

One of the main driving forces for PAC (See also: PAT) is to remove the bottleneck and time lag associated with sending the samples to the lab and waiting for the analysis results. By moving the analysis to the process, results can be obtained closer to real-time which effectively improves the ability for the control action to correct for process changes (i.e., feedback and feed forward control).

By far, the most common implementation of PAC (especially for more complex analyzers) utilizes what is known as extractive sampling. This typically involves the continuous (or sometimes periodic) removal of a small portion of sample from a much larger piping system or process vessel. This sample is then conditioned (filtered, pressure regulated, flow controlled, etc.) and introduced to the analyzer where the chemical composition or the intrinsic physical properties of process fluids (vapours and liquids) are measured. In industrial plants, the majority of sample systems and their related analyzers are installed in analyzer houses.

The hardware (traditionally metal tubing, compression fittings, valves, regulators, rotameters and filters) associated with extractive sampling is collectively referred to as the sampling system. Sample systems are used to condition or adjust the sample conditions (pressure, amount of particulate allowed, temperature and flow) to a level suitable for use with an analytical device (analyzer) such as a gas chromatograph, an oxygen analyzer or an infra red spectrometer. Despite the simple explanation just given, modern sampling systems can be quite large, complex, and expensive. The design features of analytical sample systems have changed little, when the discipline of Process Analytics began in Germany, right through until the present day. An example of an early analyzer and sample system used at the Buna Chemical Works (Schkopau, Germany), is shown in the following photograph. Process analytics remains exceptional in the fact that it is the last outpost of low level automation (retains manual adjustments and visible checks) within the process industries.

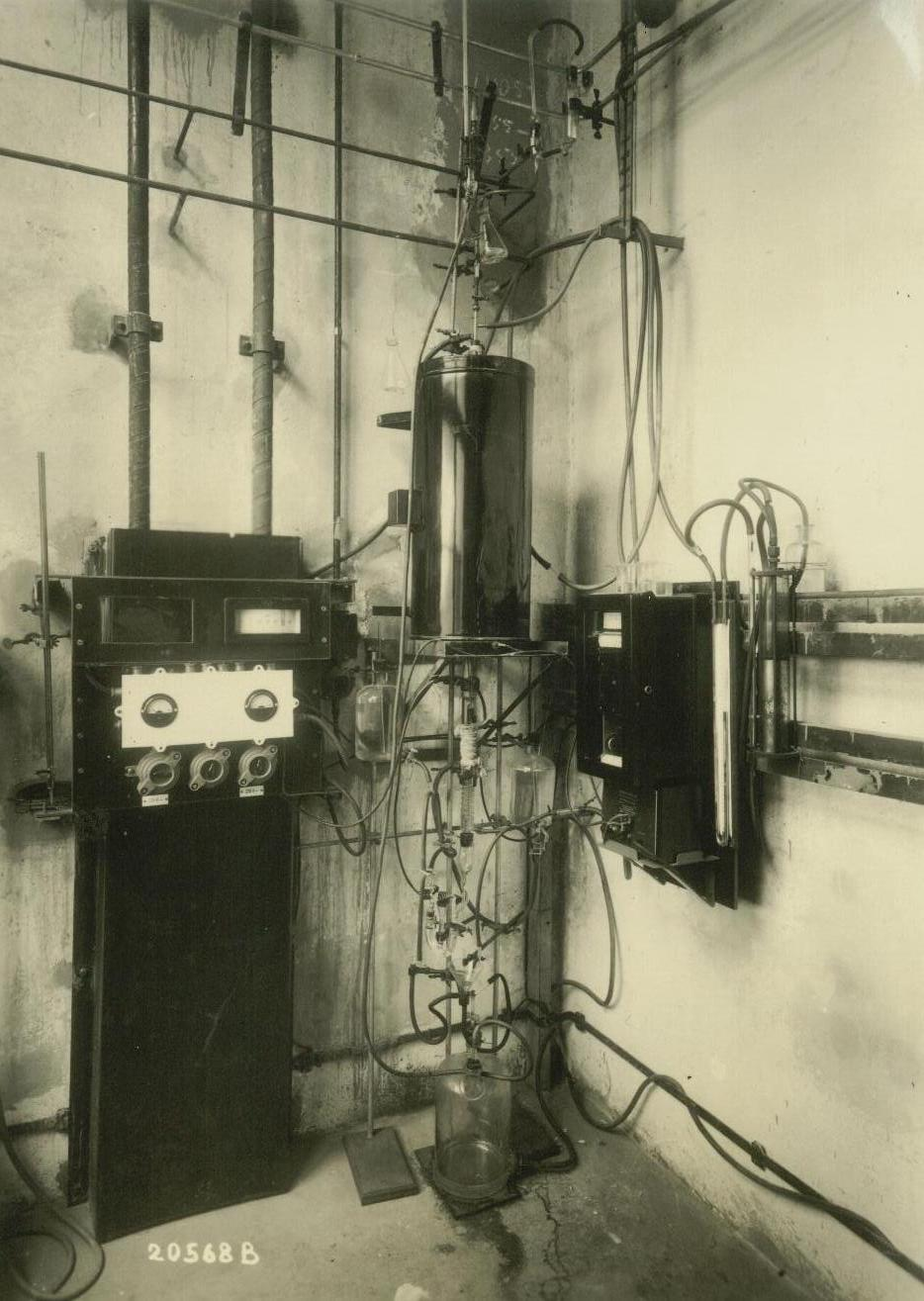
Analyzer and associated sample system Schkopau, Germany ca. 1954

== History ==
The rationale for NeSSI originated from focus group meetings held in 1999 at the Center for Process Analytical Chemistry (CPAC) which called out for more reliable sampling and analysis for the manufacturing processes. Early work with NeSSI was started in July, 2000 by Peter van Vuuren (of ExxonMobil Chemical) and Rob Dubois (of Dow Chemical) with the initial aim of adopting new types of modular and miniature hardware which were being addressed in a standard being developed by an ISA (Instrumentation, Systems and Automation Society) technical committee. (Reference 1)

The term NeSSI, along with the futuristic concepts of a communication/power bus specifically designed for process analytical (the NeSSI-bus) and fully automated sampling systems were first introduced outside of CPAC at a presentation given in January 2001 at the International Forum of Process Analytical Chemistry (IFPAC) at Amelia Island, Florida, USA. These new concepts were collected in the NeSSI Generation II Specification and released by CPAC in 2003 as an open publication. The specification is located on the CPAC website. (Reference 2)

== NeSSI Technical Objectives ==
- Facilitate the acceptance and implementation of modular, miniature and automated (smart) sample system technology using the mechanical design based on the ANSI/ISA SP76.00.02-2002 standard.
- Provide the mechanical, electrical and software infrastructure needed to accelerate the use of microanalytical sensors within the process industries.
- Move the analytical systems out of the analyzer houses by promoting the use of field-mounted analytical systems (similar to pressure transmitters) which are close-coupled to the major process equipment. (NeSSI refers to this concept as By-Line analysis)
- Lay the groundwork for the adoption of an open communication standard(s) for process analytical. This includes communication between sample system components such as flow sensors, actuators, and microanalytical sensors, as well as communication to a Distributed Control System (DCS).

Comparison of Current Technology vs. NeSSI Technology (Extractive Systems)

Current Technology	NeSSI Technology (when fully developed)
Analyzer shelters	Analytical system close to the sampling point (By-Line)
Long, heat-traced transfer lines	Short lines, fast response
Extensive design required	Simplify design by the use of web based design tools, standard component symbol sets, and more common use of modular/functional design blocks
Custom assembly	Modular assembly
Field repair	Modular replacement
Preventive maintenance required, personnel needed to monitor flows, temperatures and pressures, sometimes on a daily round basis	Predictive maintenance, diagnostic data is logged automatically, and action taken only when needed
Typically a low level of automation in the sampling system	High level automation - pressure, temperature, flow and heaters monitored and controlled
Large amount of sample	Small amount of sample, less material to condition
Conduits, seals, armoured cable, purging and pressurization	Simple plug-in connector, unarmoured wiring using miniature, flexible cable
Large space required	Small, compact, low internal volume
Multiple independent systems	Tighter integration of the sampling system with its analyzer and other support infrastructure such as heat tracing and sample disposal

== Technology Development Roadmap ==
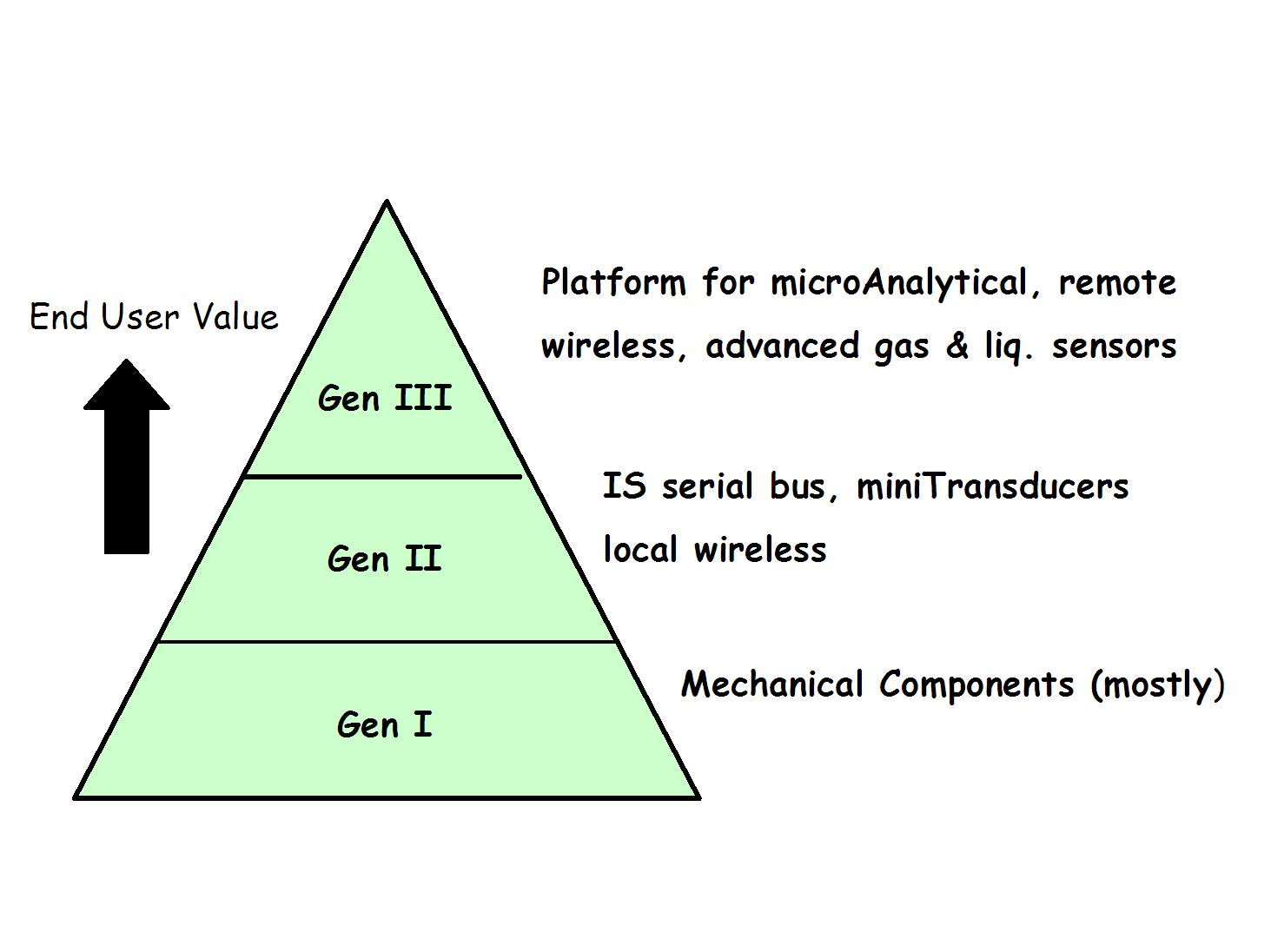
Technology Development Roadmap Pyramid

The NeSSI Technology Development Roadmap groups the technology into three generations, which are backward compatible. Generation I is a commercial product and proven in numerous industrial and laboratory applications. Generation II products have been proven in the laboratory but have yet to be commercialized. Generation III (microanalytical) is in development.

== Technical Development Generations ==
=== Generation I Fluid Components ===
Generation I covers the commercially available mechanical systems associated with the fluid handling components. Generation I has adopted the ANSI/ISA SP76.00.2002 miniature, modular mechanical standard. This standard precisely defines inlet and outlet ports and overall dimensions which allow Lego-like interchangeability of components, between different manufacturers. The ANSI/ISA standard is referenced by the International Electrotechnical Commission in publication IEC 62339-1:2006.

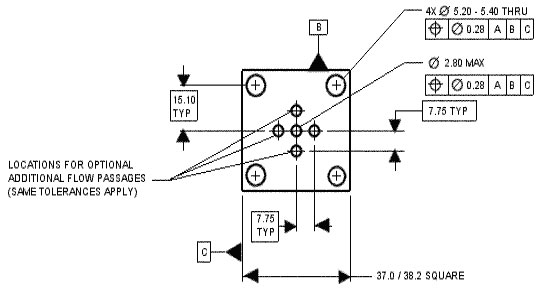
The ANSI/ISA SP76.00.02-2002 standard defines dimensions and porting.

Currently three manufacturers produce the mechanical mounting system (known as a substrate) which serves as the platform for attaching various components. Since the components are bolted to the surface of the substrate, sealed by O-rings, they are sometimes referred to as surface mount devices. (The semiconductor industry has a related system; however, the sealing is done by metallic seals rather than elastomeric O-rings.) There are currently over 60 different types of surface mount components available from various suppliers who provide valves, filters and regulators as well as pressure and flow sensing devices. Although the platform for mounting various components is common among the manufacturers, the interconnections below the surface are proprietary. The following figure shows three of the common designs. (From left to right) A Swagelok system which uses various lengths of tube connectors set in rigid channels; a CIRCORTech design which uses a single block with assorted flow-tubes; and a Parker Hannifin design which uses various blocks ported together with small connectors which also serve as flow paths.

=== Generation II Connectivity using NeSSI-bus and the SAM ===
The key elements of the NeSSI Generation II Specification are as follows.

- Adoption of a digital communication bus (NeSSI-bus) that is specifically tailored for process analytics and intended to replace 4-20 mA systems. This bus can handle up to 30 devices. (This bus would be equivalent to a plug-and-play USB bus on a personal computer but with special requirements.)
- For electrical equipment in hazardous areas, classifying the interior of an enclosure handling hazardous (flammable) fluids (e.g. hydrogen and ethylene) as Division 1/Zone 1 rather than Division/Zone 2.
- Adopting the use of a safe low energy, globally accepted method of electrical protection called intrinsic safety for the NeSSI-bus.
- Adopting the use of miniature smart/automated electronic devices including sensors (flow, pressure temperature), on/off and proportional actuators and enclosure heater controls.
- A move away from the use of local indicating devices such as gauges and rotameters in order to reduce labor-intensive manual checking (rounds).
- A move away from centralized control (automation) model to a local/field control model which is represented by a small computing device called the Sensor Actuator Manager (SAM).
- Adopting the concept of portable, commercially available software smart applets for the purpose of automating specific sample system functions. These applets would be resident in the SAM.
- Employing an Ethernet network between the SAM, the DCS and the Operator & Maintenance (O & M) user station. (NeSSI refers to this bus as the ANLAN)
- Introduction of a graphical user interface (GUI) for better visualization of physically compact sampling systems.

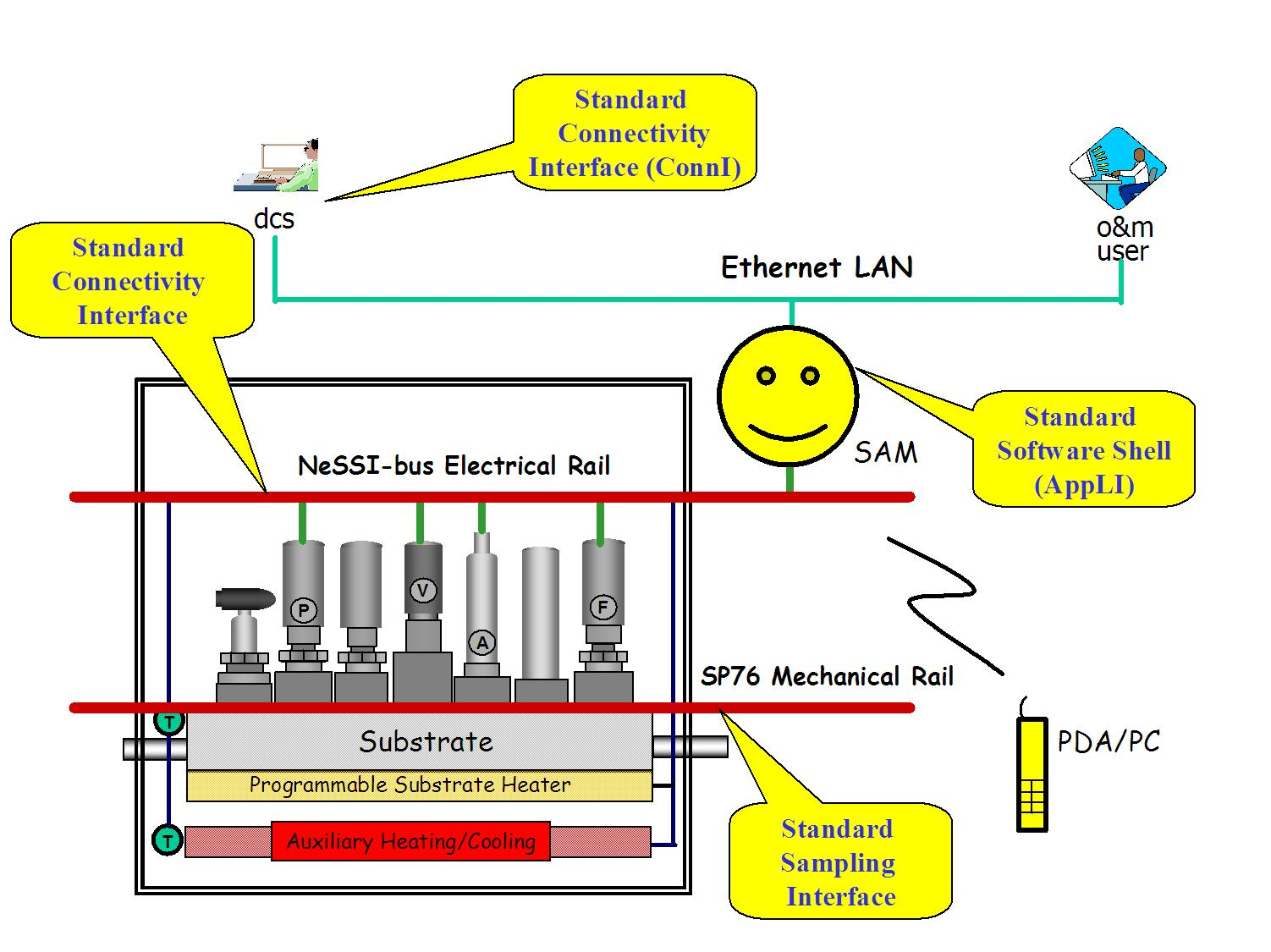
Generation II Connectivity Model using NeSSI-bus and SAM

The first prototype of a multi node/miniature Generation II system was demonstrated by Siemens Process Analytics in 2006. Siemens has adapted an existing bus system called I^{2}C to operate in an intrinsically safe mode. This work was undertaken once it was determined that existing intrinsically safe capable digital communication systems such as Foundation Fieldbus and Profibus could not meet the requirements of reduced physical size as well as the lower cost and power draw defined by the NeSSI-bus. Whether or not this bus will go into wide commercial production is unknown at this time.

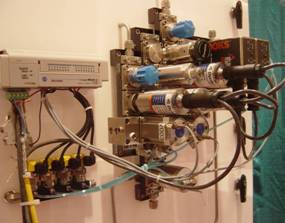
An example of a Generation 1.5 system

A nonprofit organization, CAN in Automation (CiA) released a 2007 Draft Standard Proposal (DSP-103), that specifies the physical layer of an intrinsically safe bus. [CAN = Controller Area Network] The specification has been developed by members of the CiA organization among them ABB, Pepperl+Fuchs, Texas Instruments, and Siemens. By using a lower voltage (9.5 V) for its power supply, this bus can provide more current (up to 1,000 mA) to power multiple devices in a hazardous environment. This group has standardized upon the 5-pin M8 pico connector for providing both power and signal to the devices. A commercial implementation of a process analytical system using this bus has yet to be demonstrated.

An interim development called Generation 1.5 uses both conventional 4-20 mA analogue sensors and discrete signals to actuate valves. A Programmable Logic Controller (PLC) is used as the Sensor Actuator Manager (SAM).

=== Generation III - microAnalytical ===
The introduction of new microAnalytical devices to the process industries can be enabled by employing standard physical, electrical and software interfaces. Generation III will allow tighter integration of the sample conditioning and analytical measurement devices.

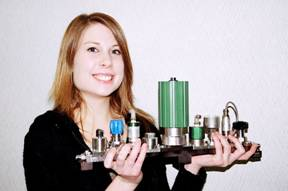
An example of an integrated analytical device (oxygen transmitter) and sampling system.

== Applications ==
NeSSI is used for process analytical measurements in the petrochemical, chemical and oil refining industries. These measurements may be for quality control of raw material or final product, environmental compliance, safety, energy reduction or process control purposes. Vapour applications may include hydrocarbon feed stocks and intermediates (ethylene, ethane, propylene, etc.), natural gas streams, liquefied petroleum gas (LPG) streams, hydrogen and air gas streams.

Liquid systems suitable for use with the Generation I mechanical portion of NeSSI are hydrocarbons such as diesel fuel as well as aqueous streams. Highly viscous fluids and solids are not suitable for use with NeSSI. Very dirty, high particulate streams need to be filtered. Some liquid service applications may be limited by pressure drops associated with components hooked up in a serial configuration. NeSSI systems have found applications in areas other than the process analytical environments including micro reactor, mini plant and laboratory environments where small size, unskilled assembly and flexible configuration is important.

== Role of CPAC ==
The development of NeSSI has been a collaborative effort between industrial end-users, manufacturers who supply the industries, and academic researchers working in the area of process analytics. CPAC continues as the focal point for NeSSI development, and sponsor of the NeSSI steering team. CPAC provides a neutral umbrella under which interested companies have been able to meet, discuss needs and issues, and make progress towards defining the future of industrial sampling and analyzer systems. The NeSSI name is trademarked by the University of Washington to ensure that it remains freely associated with the open nature of the initiative anyone can use the name NeSSI to refer to products or services that are consistent with the specifications and guidelines of NeSSI as long as they refrain from exclusively tying the name to a proprietary product or service.

== Criticism, Impact and Summary ==
Criticism of NeSSI mechanical systems have included higher initial cost, inability to troubleshoot at a component level (due to compact/intensive spacing), and the lack of performance data associated with the use of elastomeric seals in long term installations. From a design perspective, it may be difficult to design a modular, mechanical system which meets the needs of the diverse process applications found in industry. Development of the NeSSI-bus has been an iterative exercise, and it will need the close cooperation of both component and analyzer manufacturers to make their equipment NeSSI-bus compliant. At this time, there are missing elements such as a low cost, low power flow sensor which is capable of providing a continuous reading of sample system flow as well as a proportional, miniature control valve.

The predicted impact of NeSSI systems are as follows:

- Adoption of a universally accepted method of protection (intrinsic safety) for sample systems will globalize and harmonize system design and help overcome geographical restrictions currently mandated by various electrical certification/approval bodies such as Factory Mutual (FM) and Underwriters Laboratories (UL), ATEX (Europe), GOST (Russian Federation) and Canadian Standards Association (CSA).
- Analyzer technical staff will have the capability of accessing the status of all the key indicators of analytical sample system performance both locally and remotely. Predictive rather than preventive maintenance can be performed and remote diagnostics and graphical user interfaces are the norm. Analyzer rounds will be eliminated. Analyzer systems will become more reliable and trustworthy. The analyzer technician will have the power to configure a sampling/analytical system, as he/she desires using the smart applets. The adjustable wrench and screwdriver will be replaced with software.
- Molecular management meaning tighter process control by more analysis of the chemical processes - will become feasible with better, faster, less costly and more abundant analysis. This will help reduce manufacturing energy costs and minimize environmental emissions in the process industries.

Since its debut in 2000, NeSSI the mechanical portion has seen gradual but steady acceptance in industry. Currently, there are three major commercial suppliers of NeSSI compliant mechanical systems along with dozens of components available for mounting on these systems. There is also a growing list of companies implementing NeSSI systems in their manufacturing and pilot-plant facilities. Recently, two of the largest suppliers of process analyzers have committed to supporting NeSSI hardware and the development of the intrinsically safe NeSSI-bus communication into their products. NeSSI is gaining status as a de facto standard for many process sampling system applications.

NeSSI (Generation I) acceptance has spread beyond its initial chemical and petrochemical industry roots to find applications in the automotive, food, and pharmaceutical industries, as well as applications as an analytical development system in research laboratories. Generation II electrical systems are now close to commercialization with the first industrial systems scheduled for operation in 2008.
