= Mitsubishi i =

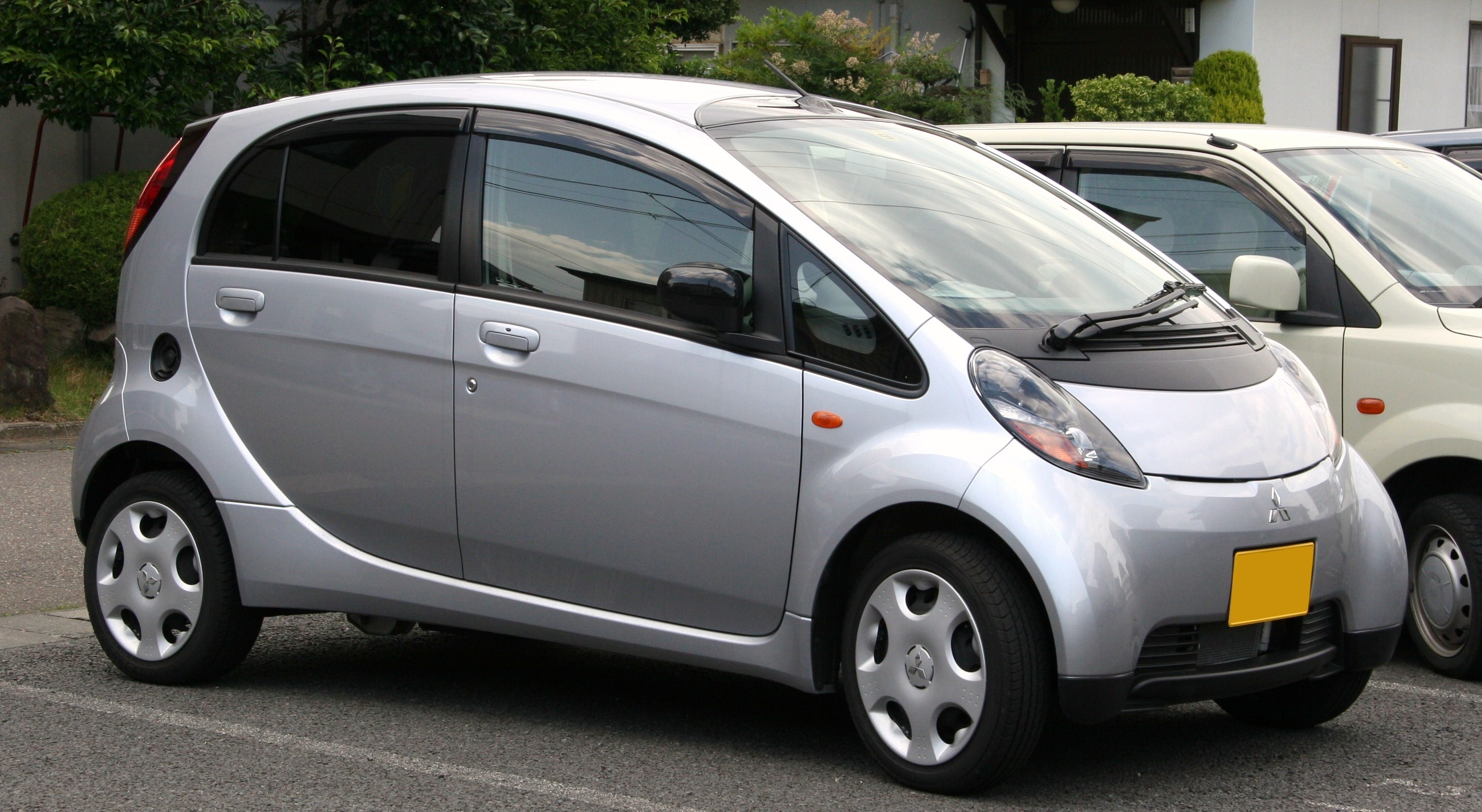

Overview
- Manufacturer: Mitsubishi Motors
- Production: 2006–2013
- Assembly: Kurashiki, Okayama, Japan (Mizushima plant)
- Designer: Olivier Boulay

Body and chassis
- Class: Kei car (A)
- Body style: 5-door hatchback
- Layout: Mid-engine, rear-/four-wheel drive
- Platform: Mitsubishi MR platform

Powertrain
- Engine: 659 cc 3B20 DOHC MIVEC 12v normally aspirated or turbocharger I3
- Transmission: 4-speed automatic

Dimensions
- Wheelbase: 2,550 mm (100.4 in)
- Length: 3,395 mm (133.7 in)
- Width: 1,475 mm (58.1 in)
- Height: 1,600 mm (63.0 in)
- Curb weight: 890–900 kg (1,960–1,980 lb)

Chronology
- Predecessor: Mitsubishi Pistachio; Mitsubishi Minica
- Successor: Mitsubishi i-MiEV; Mitsubishi eK

The Mitsubishi i (三菱・i, Mitsubishi i) is a kei car from automaker Mitsubishi Motors, first released in January 2006, twenty eight months after its debut at the 2003 Frankfurt Motor Show. It is the first four-door automobile since the 1960s to employ a "rear midship" setup with the engine behind the passengers, in an attempt to improve safety and interior space without enlarging the overall exterior.

The innovative layout and styling of the i proved an immediate critical and commercial success, exceeding Mitsubishi's initial sales targets by 20 percent and winning thirteen awards in its first year. Although designed with the Japanese keijidōsha light automobile class in mind, the attention it generated led to its subsequent introduction in right hand drive markets in Asia, Oceania and Europe. It is also used as a basis of the 2009 i-MiEV battery electric vehicle.

== Concepts: i, Se-Ro ==
A very early sketch of the i during preliminary design and development of the vehicle.

The 2003 Mitsubishi "i" Concept debuted the car's striking exterior.

Two prototypes were exhibited during the car's development. The first was the "i" Concept, which debuted at the 60th Frankfurt Motor Show in 2003, and previewed the car's striking exterior. Motoring journalists were quick to seize on the distinctive silhouette, calling it "a very good egg", and a "crystal ball" with which to see the future of Mitsubishi. One reviewer even speculated it to be an allusion by the vehicle's French-born designer Olivier Boulay to the Renault 4CV, France's popular post-war "people's car" with which the i shared its four-seat, rear-engined layout. Its styling was formally lauded when the i won the Grand Prize at the 50th anniversary Good Design Awards from the Japanese Ministry of Economy, Trade and Industry in October 2006, the first kei car to win the award.

Explaining the choice of name, the company claimed that "i" could represent the owner (I, the nominative personal pronoun) as an encouragement to personal expression, or innovation, intelligence and imagination, keywords in the car's development. It was also a play on the Japanese word for love, 愛 (pronounced [ai]).

The "i" Concept was powered by a 999 cc powerplant with the company's Mitsubishi Smart Idling (MSI) system, which turns off the engine automatically when the vehicle is stationary, and can restart it within 0.2 seconds. So equipped, Mitsubishi claimed the car was capable of fuel consumption of no more than 3.8 litres per 100 kilometres (74.3 mpg_{‑imp}; 61.9 mpg_{‑US}).

The 2003 Mitsubishi Se-Ro concept, which introduced the 660 cc engine used in the production version of the i.

The second prototype, called the Se-Ro and exhibited at the 2003 Tokyo Motor Show, previewed the production model's more conventional mechanical underpinnings, despite having a more radical appearance which bore little resemblance to the final design. Instead, its polished aluminium body was styled to resemble a zeppelin or airship, which Se-Ro design head Shuji Yamada described as a realization of his fantasies of the future from childhood. The aviation theme continued with the name; Se-Ro, short for "secret room", was a veiled reference to the Mitsubishi Zero fighter aircraft of World War II.

== Technical details ==
=== Body and dimensions ===
A lightweight steel (not aluminium) structure and a rear-engined layout allowed Mitsubishi to incorporate a larger front crumple zone, in order to meet current safety legislation requirements without compromising interior space. With no powertrain in front of the driver, the designers were able to shorten the front overhang and lengthen the wheelbase to 2,550 mm (100.4 in), giving greater legroom for passengers than many comparable kei cars whose wheelbase is typically 130–190 mm (5.1–7.5 in) less. The downside of this design was a reduction in cargo-carrying capacity, which was necessarily compromised by the engine's location in the rear.

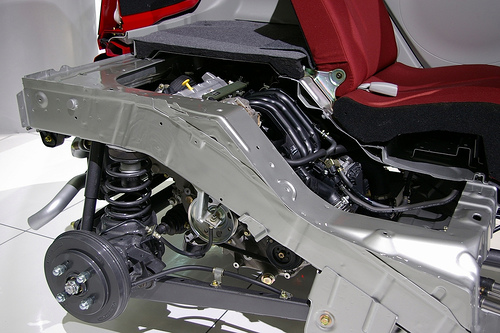
The engine of the i as seen in cutaway, behind the rear seats and under the floor of the rear hatch storage area, just ahead of the rear axle.

=== Drivetrain ===
The i has a "rear-midship" engine mounted just ahead of the rear axle, a highly unusual configuration in a small car where front-engine design has dominated since the 1970s. The 3B20 three-cylinder powerplant has an aluminium cylinder block, a displacement of 659 cubic centimetres, and incorporates double overhead camshafts with MIVEC variable valve timing in the cylinder head. Initially only an intercooled and turbocharged engine was offered, until a naturally aspirated version was introduced for 2007. A four-speed automatic gearbox transmits power to the rear or all four wheels, depending on specification.

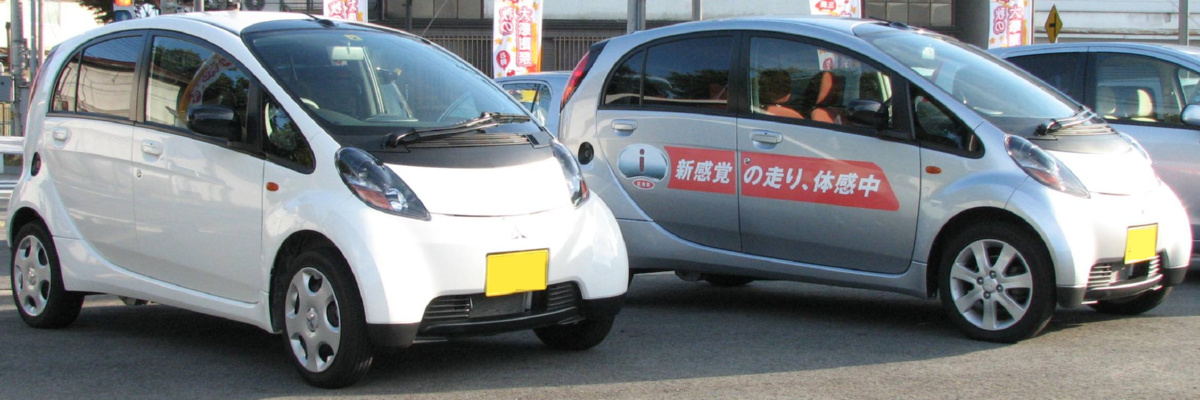
Two Mitsubishi i kei cars photographed together in Japan. The silver i is a dealer model for customers to test drive.

=== Suspension, brakes and tires ===
MacPherson struts are used in the front suspension, and an unusual three-link De Dion tube/Watt's linkage is used in the rear. Front discs with anti-lock braking (ABS) and electronic brakeforce distribution (EBD) are standard across the range. In common with many other mid- or rear-engined vehicles its fifteen-inch wheels have uneven-sized tires, 145/65 on the fronts and wider 175/55 on the rears, in an effort to minimise the chances of oversteer caused by the rear-biased weight distribution.

=== Specifications ===
Three individual models, or grades, were available on the car's release in 2006; S, M, and G, in ascending order of price. They all shared the same five-door hatchback body style and turbocharged engine, but offered differing levels of options and standard equipment. In 2007 the base S model was given the new naturally aspirated powerplant, and was positioned below the two new grades, L and LX, whose engine it shared.

Model/grade	Engine	Peak power	Peak torque
S (2007)	3B20 659 cc, DOHC, MIVEC	38 kW (52 PS) at 7000 rpm	57 N⋅m (42 lb⋅ft) at 4000 rpm
L	3B20 659 cc, DOHC, MIVEC	38 kW (52 PS) at 7000 rpm	57 N⋅m (42 lb⋅ft) at 4000 rpm
LX	3B20 659 cc, DOHC, MIVEC	38 kW (52 PS) at 7000 rpm	57 N⋅m (42 lb⋅ft) at 4000 rpm
S (2006)	3B20T 659 cc, DOHC, MIVEC, turbocharger	42–48 kW (57–65 PS) at 6000 rpm	85–95 N⋅m (63–70 lb⋅ft) at 3000 rpm
M	3B20T 659 cc, DOHC, MIVEC, turbocharger	42–48 kW (57–65 PS) at 6000 rpm	85–95 N⋅m (63–70 lb⋅ft) at 3000 rpm
G	3B20T 659 cc, DOHC, MIVEC, turbocharger	42–48 kW (57–65 PS) at 6000 rpm	85–95 N⋅m (63–70 lb⋅ft) at 3000 rpm

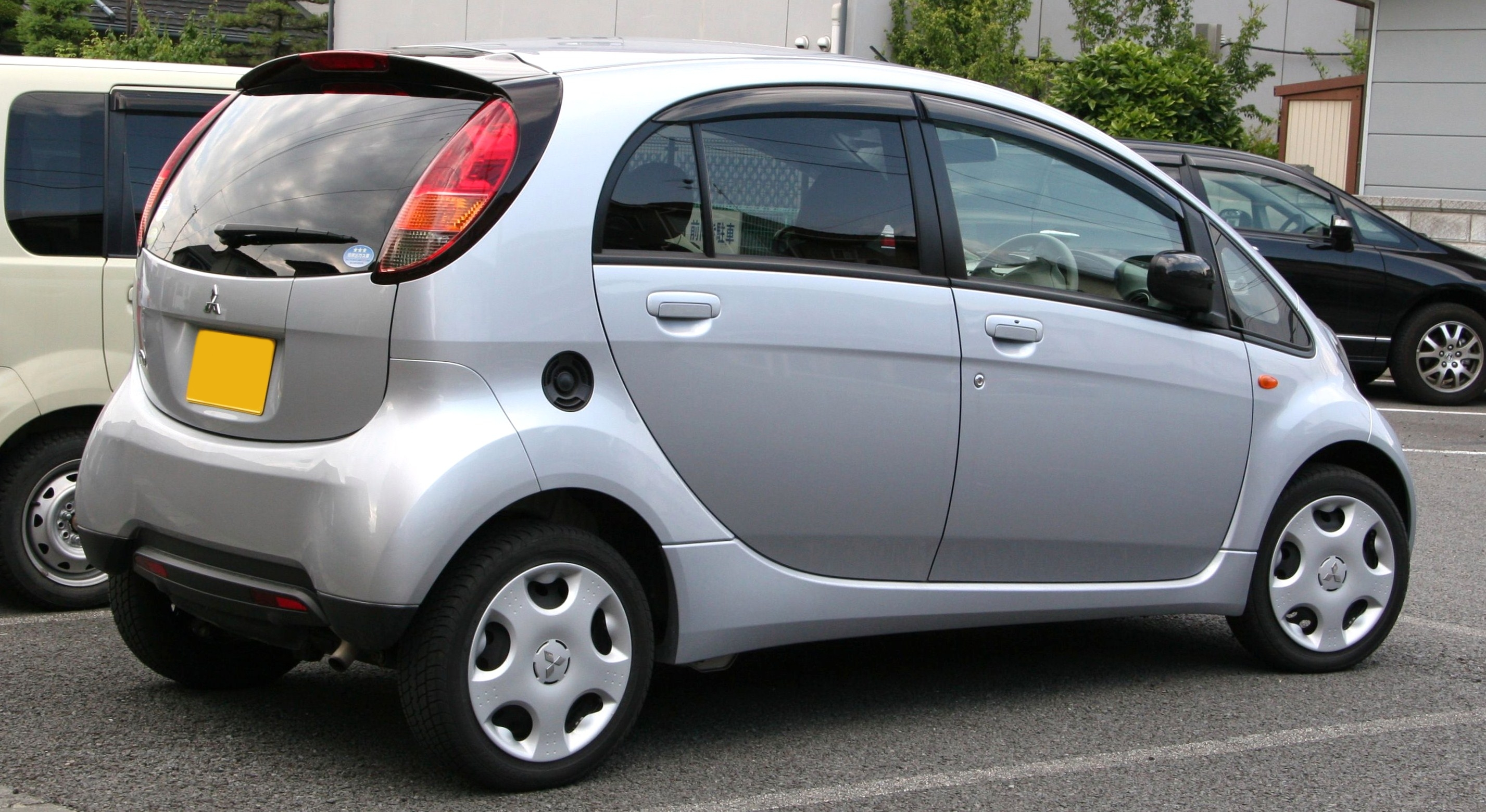
Rear view

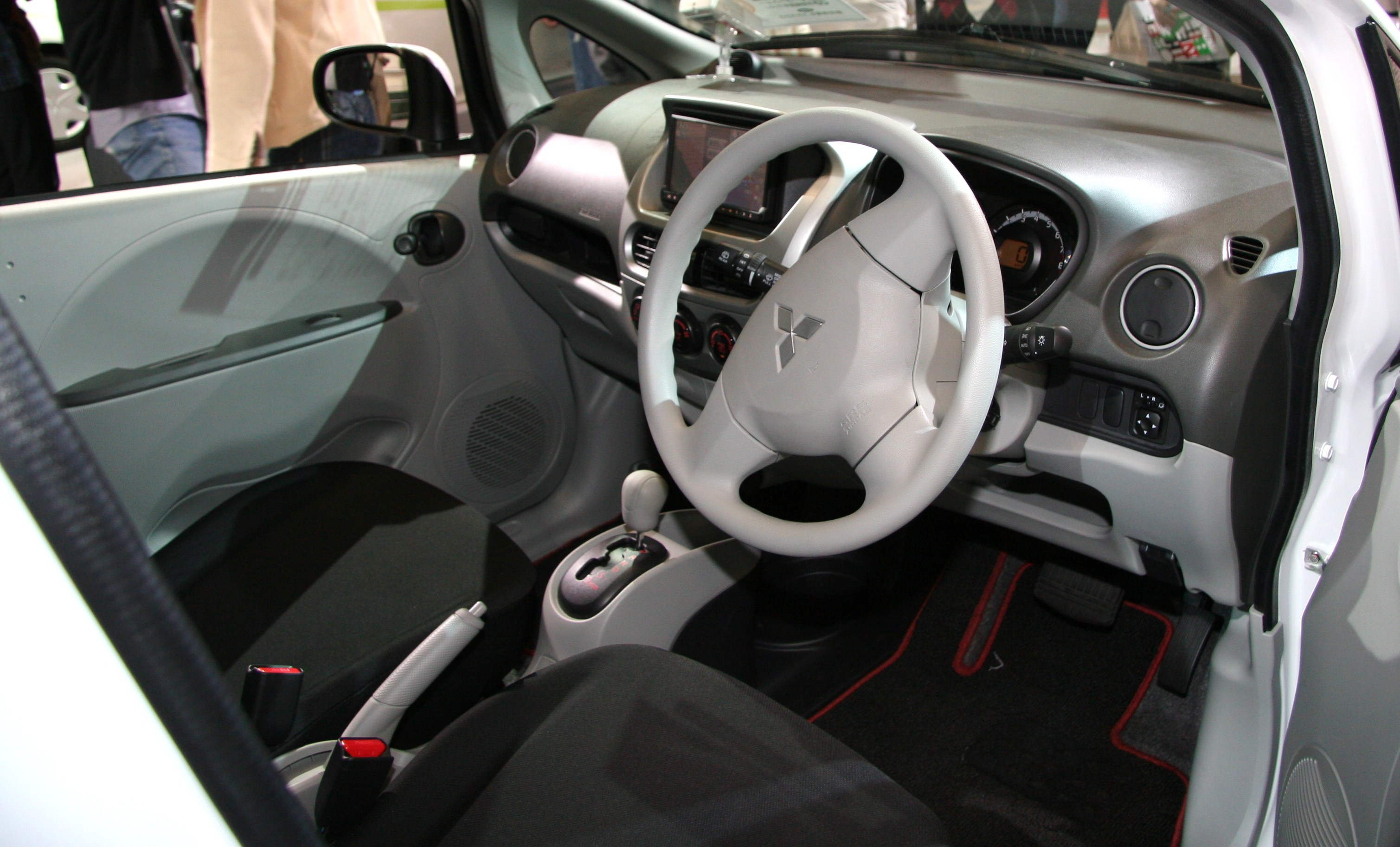
Interior

== Domestic and international markets ==
Mass production began at the company's Mizushima plant in Kurashiki, Okayama, in December 2005, before it was released for sale on January 24, 2006. Priced from ¥1,281,000 to ¥1,617,000, Mitsubishi initially aimed for 5,000 cars per month within the domestic market, and managed to exceed its target in its first month by over 1,000. By the end of 2006, approximately 37,000 had been sold. The company has already exported the i to Singapore, Brunei, Hong Kong, and New Zealand, where like Japan they drive on the left, and introduced it to the United Kingdom on July 1, 2007, with a price of GBP£9,000 and a target of 300 sales per year.

=== Annual production and sales ===
Fiscal year	Production	Sales		
Fiscal year	Production	Japan	Overseas	Total
2005	19,705	16,105	3	16,108
2006	31,725	29,498	454	29,952
2007	12,163	15,540	892	16,432
2008	8,501	8,793	267	9,060
2009	6,344	6,439	36	6,475
2010	4,655	4,685	–	4,685
2011	3,651	3,828	–	3,828
2012	2,340	2,328	–	2,328

(source: Facts & Figures 2012 , Mitsubishi Motors website)

== Special editions ==
The unique Hello Kitty edition of the Mitsubishi i, which was on public display in Tokyo for one week before being auctioned for charity.

From July 25 to 31, 2006 the company displayed a unique Mitsubishi i Hello Kitty edition at the Mitsukoshi department store in Tokyo's Nihonbashi district. Based on the two-wheel drive G model, it had a pink paint scheme with co-ordinated interior, "Princess Kitty" decals on the doors and windows, a ribbon decal on the roof, and themed headrests with small, feline ears. The car, which was described as "the most quintessentially Japanese car...ever" for fusing two of the country's cultural icons—Hello Kitty and keijidōsha—was eventually sold in a charity auction on behalf of UNICEF.

Other limited production models include the i Play edition, a run of 3,000 cars only available in white or black, and featuring a dashboard-mounted slot for an iPod nano,

Also 100 of the i Kurashiki edition with faux denim upholstery, to be sold at a single Mitsubishi dealership in Kurashiki, Okayama, the prefecture where the bulk of Japan's domestic blue jeans manufacturers are located.

1st Anniversary special editions based on the L and M grades were also introduced in early 2007 to commemorate the car's first year on sale.

== Electric car version ==
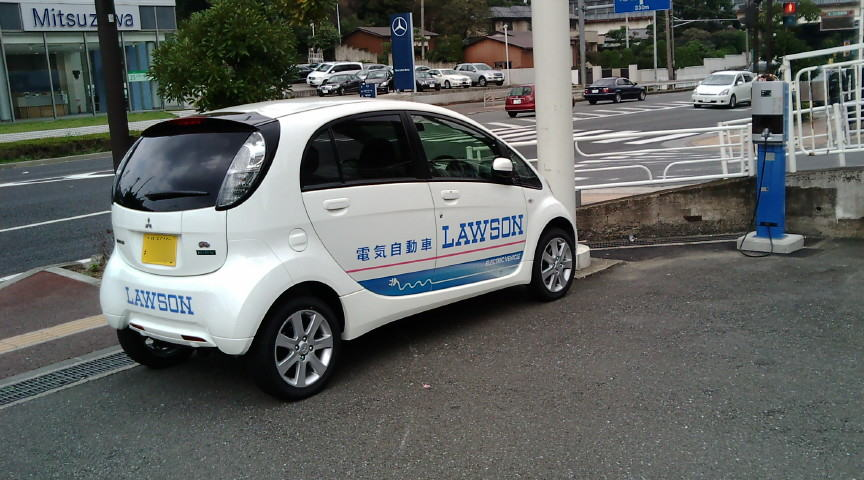
Mitsubishi i-MiEV recharging from an on-street charging station in Japan.

Mitsubishi has given the i a prominent role in the company's alternative propulsion research projects, developing a version using their MiEV (Mitsubishi innovative Electric Vehicle) technology in 2006 and exhibited at the 22nd International Battery, Hybrid and Fuel Cell Electric Vehicle Symposium & Exposition in Yokohama. MMC provided three power companies with vehicles in 2006 and 2007 in order to evaluate how a "fast-charge" infrastructure might be developed for electric vehicles. Fleet testing by five power companies was conducted later in 2007, with a view to future public sales between 2008 and 2010.

The Mitsubishi i-MiEV electric car was launched in Japan for fleet customers in July 2009 and for the general public in April 2010. Sales to the public in Hong Kong began in May 2010, and a trial began in Australia in September 2010. Sales in several European countries began in late 2010 and between December 2011 and March 2012 for the United States west and east coasts, respectively.

== Awards ==
The i won the 2007 Car of the Year award from the Japanese Automotive Researchers and Journalists Conference (RJC), and two other "Car of the Year" awards, from the Carview Corporation website and the Consumer's Choice. It also won the "Most Advanced Technology" Special Achievement Award at the 2006–07 Japan Car of the Year awards, where it was nominated unsuccessfully in the overall Car of the Year category, and ranked first in the Japan Mini-Car APEAL Study published by J.D. Power Asia Pacific in October 2006, with a higher score than any previous winner.

Aside from the 2006 Good Design Grand Prix, its style won Design Awards from the Japan Automotive Hall of Fame (JAHFA), and the magazines Popeye and Car Styling.

== See also ==
- Mitsubishi i-MiEV electric car
