= Mitsubishi MR platform =

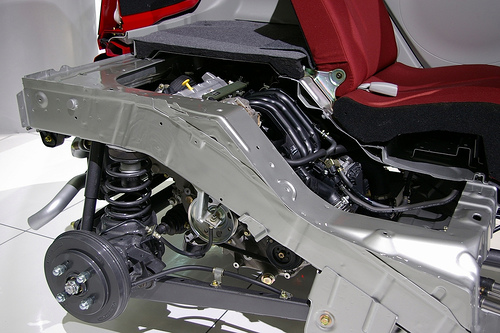
- The rear suspension of the Mitsubishi i as seen in cutaway, showing the engine behind the rear seats and under the floor of the rear hatch storage area, just ahead of the rear axle.

Overview
- Manufacturer: Mitsubishi Motors
- Production: January 2006–2021

Body and chassis
- Class: Kei car
- Vehicles: Mitsubishi i

Dimensions
- Wheelbase: 2,550–2,600 mm (100.4–102.4 in)

The Mitsubishi MR platform is an automobile platform first developed by Mitsubishi Motors in 2003 for their Mitsubishi i kei car. The name is derived from the Mid-engined, Rear-wheel drive ("MR") configuration, which locates the powertrain behind the rear seat and just ahead of the rear axle. This allows for a longer wheelbase and a consequently more spacious interior without compromising crashworthiness or fuel economy. However, in the case of the Evo, MR stands for Mitsubishi Racing.

The company has also used the platform in several of its concept cars, particularly those using alternative propulsion. The i-Concept and Se-Ro were the first publicly exhibited vehicles to use the MR platform, as they previewed the production version of the i at motor shows in advance of the car's release. Since then, the Concept-CT, i-MiEV, and i MiEV Sport battery electric concept cars all exploited the MR platform.
