= Nessie (disambiguation) =

Nessie is a nickname of the Loch Ness Monster, a cryptid that reputedly inhabits the Loch Ness lake in Scotland.

Nessie or NESSIE may also refer to:

== People ==
- Andrew Nesbitt Nessie Snedden (1892–1968), New Zealand cricketer
- Nessie Stewart-Brown (1864–1958), British suffragist and politician

== Fictional characters ==
- Renesmee Carlie Cullen or Nessie, in the novel Breaking Dawn, part of the Twilight series
- Vanessa Kapatelis or Nessie, in the Wonder Woman comic books
- Nessie, an amphibious character in the Boneyard comic book series
- Nessie, in Kaiju ouji, a Japanese tokusatsu/kaiju television series
- Nessie, a fictional shark, specifically Loch Ness Monster, (possibly also a reptilian creature or dinosaur) present as a playable character in the video game Hungry Shark Evolution, an installment in the video game series Hungry Shark

== Other uses ==
- NESSIE or New European Schemes for Signatures, Integrity and Encryption, a European research project to identify secure cryptographic primitives
- Mitsubishi Nessie, a concept automobile
- Tropical cyclone Nessie, in the 1973–74 South Pacific cyclone season
- Nessie Rock in Antarctica
- Nessie (film), a 2023 British-American film

== See also ==
- National Survey of Student Engagement (NSSE), a survey instrument for student participation levels at universities and colleges in Canada and the United States
- Nessi
