= Mitsubishi Pistachio =

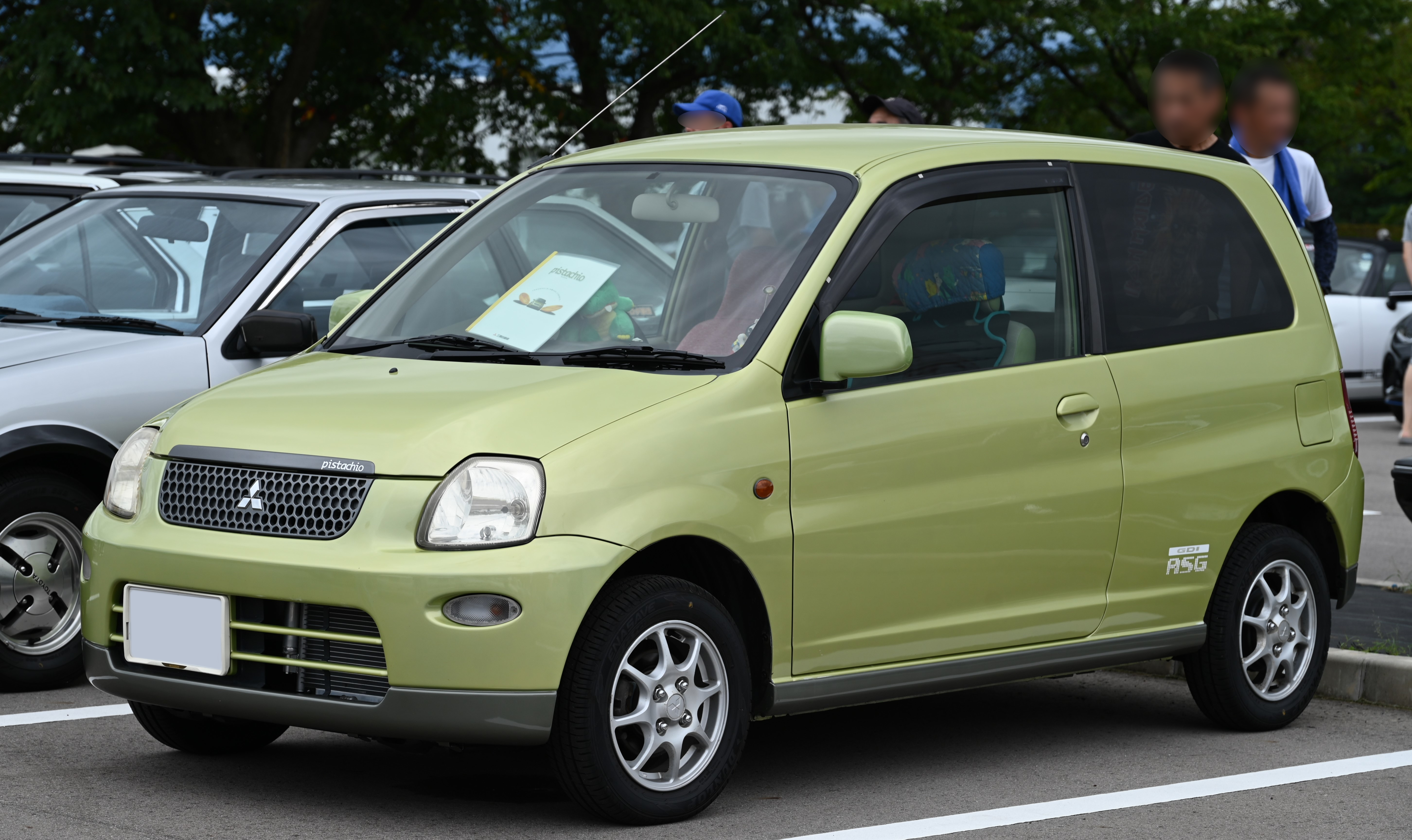

Overview
- Manufacturer: Mitsubishi Motors
- Production: 1999; 50 produced

Body and chassis
- Body style: 3-door hatchback
- Related: Mitsubishi Minica

Powertrain
- Engine: 1094 cc 4A31 DOHC 16v GDI I4
- Transmission: 5-speed manual

Dimensions
- Wheelbase: 2,340 mm (92.1 in)
- Length: 3,440 mm (135.4 in)
- Width: 1,475 mm (58.1 in)
- Height: 1,510 mm (59.4 in)
- Curb weight: 700 kg (1,543 lb)

Chronology
- Successor: Mitsubishi i

The Mitsubishi Pistachio is a three-door hatchback introduced by Mitsubishi Motors in December 1999, based on the platform of their Minica kei car. Only 50 Pistachios were sold in either Citron Yellow and Loire Green colour schemes, priced at ¥959,000, to local authorities and public corporations working to protect the environment.

== Specifications ==
Powered by a 4A31 1094 cc DOHC 16v engine capable of 54 kW (73 PS; 72 hp) at 6000 rpm and 100 N⋅m (74 lb⋅ft) of torque at 4000 rpm, the car was designed to maximize fuel economy and minimize emissions. It had a 700 kg (1,543 lb) kerb weight, slim 135/80R13 tyres, electric power steering, lightweight stainless steel exhaust manifold, lightweight aluminium wheels, aluminium hood, thin-gauge glass, and an aluminium seatback. Under the hood, it utilized both gasoline direct injection (GDI) and Automatic Stop-Go (ASG), a system which turns off the engine while the vehicle is stationary and automatically restarts it when the clutch is depressed. So equipped, the Pistachio recorded fuel consumption of 3.33 l/100 km (84.8 mpg_{‑imp}; 70.6 mpg_{‑US}), unprecedented for an exclusively gasoline-powered vehicle.
