= Mitsubishi ESR =

Overview
- Manufacturer: Mitsubishi Motors

Body and chassis
- Class: Concept car

Dimensions
- Length: 4,530 mm (178.3 in)
- Width: 1,720 mm (67.7 in)
- Height: 1,580 mm (62.2 in)

The Mitsubishi ESR (Ecological Science Research) is a hybrid electric vehicle (HEV) concept exhibited by Mitsubishi Motors at the 30th Tokyo Motor Show in 1993. It was designed to demonstrate the company's technological developments in alternative energy, and used a 70 kW AC induction motor to drive the front wheels. 28 alkaline batteries housed under the passenger compartment, and a rear-mounted 1.5-litre gasoline engine powered an onboard electrical generator system. It also recycled its own kinetic energy, and absorbed solar power through roof-mounted cells.

The car was estimated to have a range of 620 miles (1,000 km) on hybrid power at a constant 25 miles per hour (40 km/h), or 310 miles (500 km) using only the batteries. A Global Positioning System (GPS) receiver could automatically switch the vehicle from hybrid to battery-only operation when entering an urban area. Mitsubishi claimed a maximum speed of 200 kilometres per hour (120 mph), thanks in part to a drag coefficient of 0.25.
