= Mitsubishi RPM 7000 =

Overview
- Manufacturer: Mitsubishi Motors
- Production: 2001
- Designer: Mike Desmond

Body and chassis
- Class: Concept car
- Body style: Sports crossover

The Mitsubishi RPM 7000 is a concept car designed by the Cypress, California Design Studio of Mitsubishi Motors and exhibited at the 2001 North American International Auto Show. Displayed alongside the Mitsubishi ASX, the two vehicles represented the company's vision for sporty, stylish crossover SUVs. However, while the ASX defined Mitsubishi's production plans, the RPM 7000 was a more radical styling exercise and an overt celebration of the company's motorsport heritage. The World Rally Championship-winning Mitsubishi Lancer Evolution and the Dakar Rally-winning Mitsubishi Pajero provided the engine and drivetrain, while chief stylist Mike Desmond acknowledged the influence of Formula One in the "nosecone" front grille and hood. Elements of rallying and GT racing were also incorporated. Other unusual elements included the teardrop silhouette, side exit exhaust pipe, and the suicide doors on the passenger side only.

Although it was speculated that the RPM could make it to production within two years of its exhibition, these rumours proved unfounded.
