= Marzio Nessi =

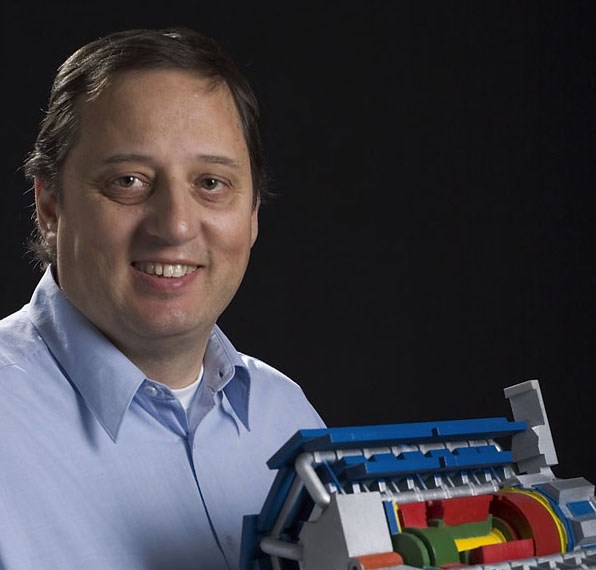
- Marzio Nessi (CERN photograph)
- Education: ETH Zurich
- Scientific career
- Fields: Physics
- Workplaces: CERN - European Organization for Nuclear Research; Fermilab - Fermi National Accelerator Laboratory; University of Geneva

Marzio Nessi (born 1957 in Muralto, Switzerland) is an experimental physicist with a focus on high-energy and high-intensity particle physics.

Nessi studied mathematics and physics at ETH Zurich (Switzerland) where he obtained his Ph.D. degree on an experiment at Lawrence Berkeley National Laboratory. Since 1989, he has been working at CERN. He has been the coordinator of the CERN Neutrino Platform (CENF) and a titular professor in the physics department of the University of Geneva.

== Biography and scientific career ==
Marzio Nessi received his undergraduate and graduate education at ETH Zurich, studying mathematics and physics. After obtaining his Ph.D. degree and a short period as a postdoctoral research scientist at ETH, working on medium energy physics and accelerator-based mass spectrometry, he moved to Rice University in Houston, USA. There, he changed the focus of his research towards experimental particle physics. During his time in the US, Nessi participated in experiments at Brookhaven National Laboratory, Fermilab, Los Alamos and CERN.

In 1989, he transferred to CERN as a research fellow, becoming a staff physicist soon after. Since then, he has been involved in various experiments. He took part in the UA2 experiment and was spokesman of the RD34 project.

Marzio Nessi contributed to the ATLAS experiment from its beginning on. He was a founder and later project leader of the ATLAS tile calorimeter as well as overall ATLAS technical coordinator. He served as ATLAS project manager from 2000 until 2013, when the Higgs boson was discovered.

Since 2011 he has been a titular professor in the physics department of the University of Geneva, and for ten years he has been the general coordinator of the CERN Neutrino Platform (CENF), which he founded in 2012.

Since April 2014, he is the Scientific Director of the Journal of Instrumentation.

In 2014 he co-founded the CERN IdeaSquare innovation platform, which became the basis of the European Union ATTRACT programme and the GRADE research programme.

Since the beginning of the LBNF/DUNE research programme, Marzio Nessi became involved in the US neutrino program. This meant first rebuilding at CERN the ICARUS detector and installing it at Fermilab, then participating in the SBND Fermilab experiment, leading the Liquid Argon membrane cryostat and cryogenics construction.

In 2020 he has been asked by the Italian INFN president to become the construction director for the experiment DARKSIDE-20K at LNGS.

Since the creation of the LBNF/DUNE neutrino programme in 2014, Marzio Nessi took a leading role in the definition and R&D of the far detectors, promoting and supporting the concept of protoDUNE, which has given a strong realistic basis to the entire neutrino US program. In 2017 he took the leadership in defining all integration and installation activities of the LBNF/DUNE far detectors.

In 2019 he was appointed Deputy Project Director of LBNF/DUNE, responsible for all activities related to the far detectors and cryogenics, a US-Fermilab role that he is still fulfilling at present.
