= Mitsubishi Gaus =

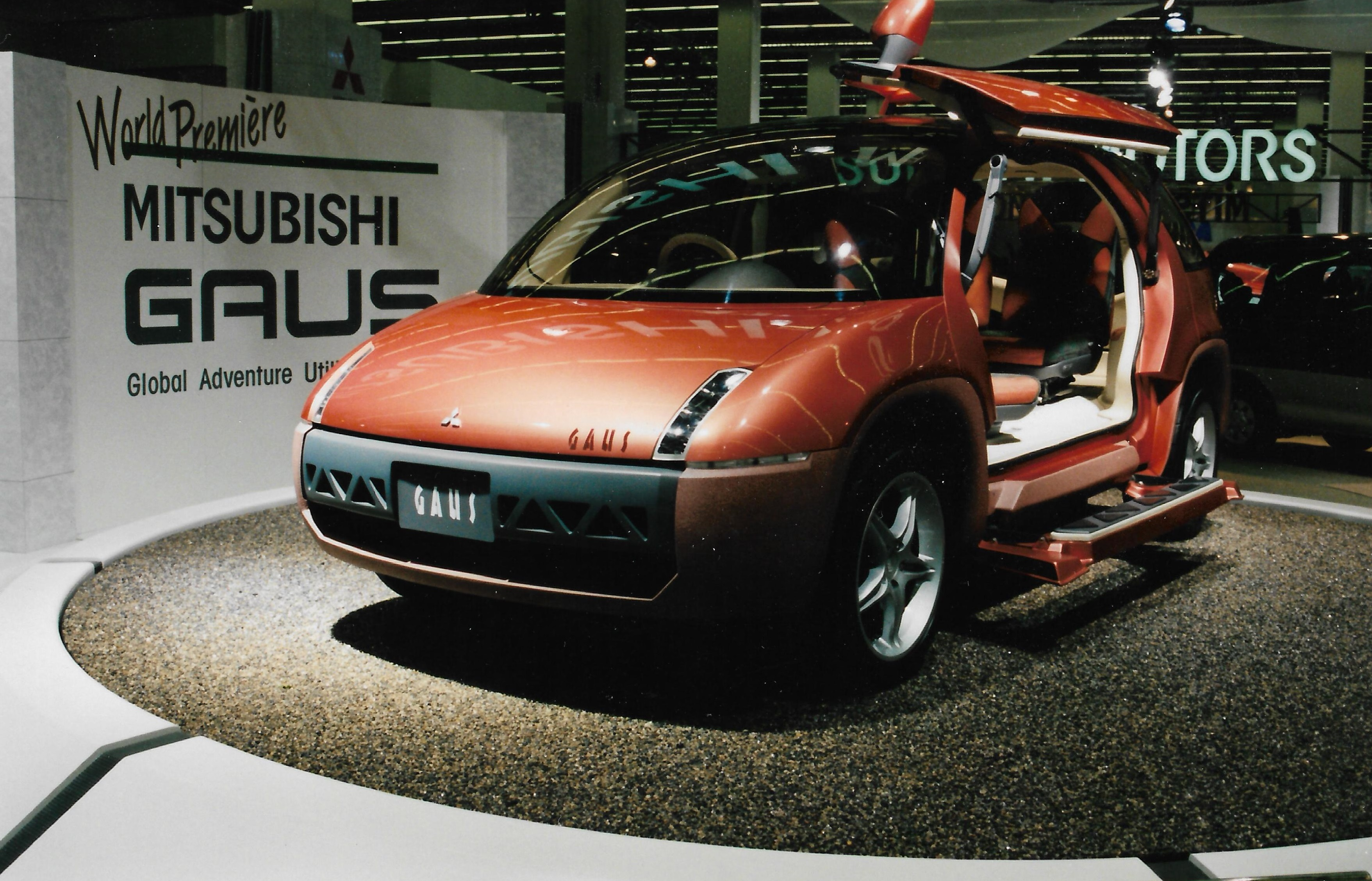

Overview
- Manufacturer: Mitsubishi Motors
- Production: 1995

Body and chassis
- Class: Concept car
- Body style: 5-door SUV
- Layout: Front engine, 4WD

Powertrain
- Engine: 2.0 L straight-4
- Transmission: automatic

The Mitsubishi Gaus is a concept car exhibited by Japanese automaker Mitsubishi Motors at the 31st Tokyo Motor Show in 1995 and the 8th North American International Auto Show in Detroit in 1996.

A "new age" SUV, it focused its design on improving interior space and comfort. Access was facilitated by horizontally split doors, where the upper half folded upwards to the roof, while the lower half folded down to act as a step for easier ingress and egress. The front seats could be rotated so that all passengers were facing each other in a "living room" configuration. Alternatively, the rear seats could be removed entirely to provide more space.

The vehicle was powered by a two-litre, sixteen valve engine, with the power transmitted to all four wheels through an automatic transmission.
