= Process analytical chemistry =

Process analytical chemistry (PAC) is the application of analytical chemistry with specialized techniques, algorithms, and sampling equipment for solving problems related to chemical processes. It is a specialized form of analytical chemistry used for process manufacturing similar to process analytical technology (PAT) used in the pharmaceutical industry.

The chemical processes are for production and quality control of manufactured products, and process analytical technology is used to determine the physical and chemical composition of the desired products during a manufacturing process. It is first mentioned in the chemical literature in 1946(1,2).

== Process sampling ==
Process analysis initially involved sampling the variety of process streams or webs and transporting samples to quality control or central analytical service laboratories. Time delays for analytical results due to sample transport and analytical preparation steps negated the value of many chemical analyses for purposes other than product release. Over time it was understood that real-time measurements provided timely information about a process, which was far more useful for high efficiency and quality. The development of real-time process analysis has provided information for process optimization during any manufacturing process. The journal Analytical Chemistry (journal) publishes a biennial review of the most recent developments in the field.

The first real-time measurements in a production environment were made with modified laboratory instrumentation; in recent times specialized process and handheld instrumentation has been developed for immediate analysis.

== Applications ==
Process analytical chemistry involves the following sub-disciplines of analytical chemistry: microanalytical systems, nanotechnology, chemical detection, electrochemistry or electrophoresis, chromatography, spectroscopy, mass spectrometry, process chemometrics, process control, flow injection analysis, ultrasound, and handheld sensors.
