= Mitsubishi SUW =

- Mitsubishi SUW concepts, from top: SUW Advance, SUW Compact, SUW Active.

Overview
- Manufacturer: Mitsubishi Motors
- Production: 1999

Body and chassis
- Class: Concept cars
- Body style: 3-door hatchback 5-door hatchback 5-door sport utility vehicle

The Mitsubishi SUW (Smart Utility Wagon) is a series of concept cars sharing a common design theme, and first exhibited by Japanese automaker Mitsubishi Motors at the 1999 Frankfurt and Tokyo Motor Shows.

The Smart Utility Wagon theme was introduced late in 1998 as a demonstration of the company's corporate slogan of the time, "Innovation in Motion", which was itself to represent "smart design" and "ecology conscious[ness]". Specifically, SUWs shared the company's gasoline direct injection (GDI) engine technology, a taller roofline for easier entry and exit, and interior space competitive with larger vehicles. The three individual vehicles Mitsubishi produced were the SUW Advance, a five-door hatchback family car, the SUW Compact a three-door hatchback small car, and the SUW Active sport utility vehicle.

== SUW Advance ==
The SUW Advance hatchback was designed with accommodation for five adults and high fuel economy as its highest priorities. Externally, it measured 3,880 millimetres (152.8 in), 1,695 mm (66.7 in) wide, and 1,505 mm (59.3 in) high, while suicide doors at the rear and no central vertical pillar allowed easier entry and egress. The car was powered by a 105 PS (77 kW; 104 hp) GDI-HEV hybrid electric powertrain; a 1.5-litre internal combustion engine using gasoline direct injection and an array of lithium ion batteries, mated to a continuously variable transmission. With a lightweight 980 kg (2,161 lb) body and a drag coefficient of 0.28, Mitsubishi claimed it to be capable of 31.5 kilometres per litre (89.0 mpg_{‑imp}; 74.1 mpg_{‑US}).

== SUW Compact ==
The SUW Compact was designed for urban environments, so compactness and manoeuvrability were prioritised alongside fuel economy. The Compact was 3,580 mm (140.9 in) long, 1,685 mm (66.3 in) wide and 1,515 mm (59.6 in) high, and it benefited from a turning circle of 4.4 metres (14.4 ft). The powertrain also utilised GDI technology, this time as a 78 PS (57 kW; 77 hp) 1.1-litre with ASG (Automatic Stop-Go), a system which turns off the engine when it is idling and restarts it on demand. Combined with its drag coefficient of 0.30, the Compact claimed fuel consumption of 4.5 litres per 100 kilometres (62.8 mpg_{‑imp}; 52.3 mpg_{‑US}).

== SUW Active ==
The SUW Active did not appear alongside its siblings at Frankfurt, debuting instead in Tokyo in October. Another GDI powertrain was used, this time fitted with a turbocharger. The car measured 4,240 mm (166.9 in) long, 1,745 mm (68.7 in) wide and 1,535 mm (60.4 in) high.
