= Mitsubishi Nessie =

Overview
- Manufacturer: Mitsubishi Motors
- Production: 2005
- Designer: Italdesign Giugiaro

Body and chassis
- Class: Concept car
- Body style: 2-door SUV coupé
- Layout: Front engine, 4WD
- Platform: Mitsubishi Pajero

Powertrain
- Engine: Linde hydrogen-powered V8

Dimensions
- Wheelbase: 2,780 mm (109.4 in)
- Length: 4,600 mm (181.1 in)
- Width: 1,950 mm (76.8 in)
- Height: 1,810 mm (71.3 in)

The Mitsubishi Nessie is a concept automobile co-developed by Italdesign Giugiaro, The Linde Group and Mitsubishi Motors, and exhibited at the 2005 Geneva Auto Show. It is the latest in a line of SUVs, space-wagons and alternative architectures designed by Giugiaro dating back to 1978 and the Lancia Megagamma, with more recent examples including the Giugiaro Touareg (2002), Maserati Kubang (2003) and Volkswagen Tarek (2003).

It uses the platform of the Dakar Rally-winning Mitsubishi Pajero and a hydrogen-powered V8 engine developed by German industrial gases company The Linde Group, mated to an automatic transmission. Styling features include 22 inch front and 23 inch rear wheels, glass panels in the lower half of the doors to enhance visibility in town or off-road, and an arrow-shaped roll bar/roof-rack which extends from the C-pillars over the glass roof, without being affixed to it.

Although it was rumoured that the second generation Airtrek/Outlander might have incorporated styling elements from the Nessie, this never materialised, as the overall shape and design details proved too complex for practical mass production.
