= MIEV =

Mitsubishi's MIEV logo

MIEV (Mitsubishi In-wheel motor Electric Vehicle) or MiEV (Mitsubishi innovative Electric Vehicle) /ˈmiːv/ is the name given by Japanese automaker Mitsubishi Motors (MMC) to its alternative propulsion technologies. From late 2006, “MiEV” encompasses all of Mitsubishi Motors’s electric drive systems work, including lithium-ion batteries, in-wheel motors and other technologies related to electric vehicle (EV), hybrid-electric vehicle and fuel-cell vehicles.

The Mitsubishi In-wheel motor was first introduced in the Mitsubishi Colt EV, a Colt-based concept car first exhibited at 2005 Tokyo Motor Show which used a series of lithium-ion batteries to power electric motors located in the wheels. Subsequent electrically powered vehicles have included a 200 kW Lancer Evolution, and a battery-equipped Mitsubishi i kei car (i-MIEV).

The i-MiEV was launched for fleet customers in Japan in July 2009, and on April 1, 2010 sales to the public began in the Japanese market at a price of 4 million yen
(~USD43,000). After government incentives the sale price drops to 2.8 million yen (~USD30,500). Sales in other countries are expected to begin in October 2010. Sales in Ireland and the U.K. are scheduled to begin in January 2011.

== History ==
Before developing the first MIEV concept, Mitsubishi built several electric vehicles in the 1990s as they attempted to develop alternative propulsion systems. Development began in the 1970s, and 36 Libero EVs were sold between 1993 and 1996. Their FTO EV broke the record for the furthest distance achieved by an electric vehicle in 24 hours when it covered 2,142.3 km on December 19–20, 1999, and following this success they entered an Eclipse EV in the annual Shikoku EV Rally in 2001, completing over 400 km on a single charge.

== Technology ==
MIEV motors are constructed using an in-wheel motor rotor, an in-wheel motor stator, a rotor bracket, stator bracket and inverter directly behind the brakes. The batteries can be charged from a standard 15 A/200 V car charger in seven hours and with a three-phase electric power charged in 25 minutes (for up to 80 percent of full capacity). The batteries are located under the floorpan and in the Colt uses 22 Li-ion modules to produce a cumulative 325 V. The design allows for an entirely electric vehicle, or a hybrid using the batteries to supplement a traditional internal combustion engine or a hydrogen fuel cell.

== Benefits ==
According to Mitsubishi, locating the motor behind the wheel offers the company three distinct advantages:

1. It allows for a four wheel drive system without need of transmission, driveshafts, differential gears or other complex mechanical components. Mitsubishi Motors has been one of the few companies to persist in offering 4WD on vehicles other than off-road vehicles since the technology's heyday in the 1980s.
2. Placing the drive system entirely in the wheels allows for greater freedom of design for interior stylists.
3. The space created facilitates the storage of the batteries, allowing for extra modules to be fitted which would offer increased power and range compared to previous electric vehicles.

== Vehicles ==
=== Mitsubishi Colt EV (2005) ===
Based on the platform of a Mitsubishi Colt, and first exhibited in 2005, it was the first Mitsubishi EV where mass production and public sales were mooted, with a suggested price tag of US$19,000. The car was driven by two in-wheel motors located in the rear wheels each producing a power of 20 kW (27 hp) and 600 N⋅m (443 lb⋅ft) of torque without the need for a transmission. This gave the car a top speed of 150 km/h (93 mph) and an estimated range of 150 km (93 mi) with a 13 kWh battery pack.

=== Mitsubishi Lancer Evolution MIEV (2005) ===
A Mitsubishi Lancer Evolution IX sedan fitted with four 50 kW (67 hp) motors took part in the 2005 Shikoku EV Rally. The Lancer MIEV is capable of 180 km/h (112 mph), and has a range of 250 km (155 mi).

=== Mitsubishi Concept-CT MIEV (2006) ===
The first MIEV prototype based on the platform and "rear midship" layout of the Mitsubishi i kei car, the Concept-CT is a sport compact prototype, and was first exhibited at the 2006 North American International Auto Show.

=== Mitsubishi Concept-EZ MIEV (2006) ===
The Concept-EZ is a compact mono-box prototype exhibited at the 2006 Geneva Motor Show, and designed to showcase the benefits of MIEV technology on the car's interior design. The wheels are located as close to the corners of the vehicle as possible, and each houses a 20 kW (27 hp) outer rotor in-wheel motor. With no central powertrain the floor could be kept low and flat to liberate extra interior space, despite the vehicle's height of 1,750 mm (68.9 in).

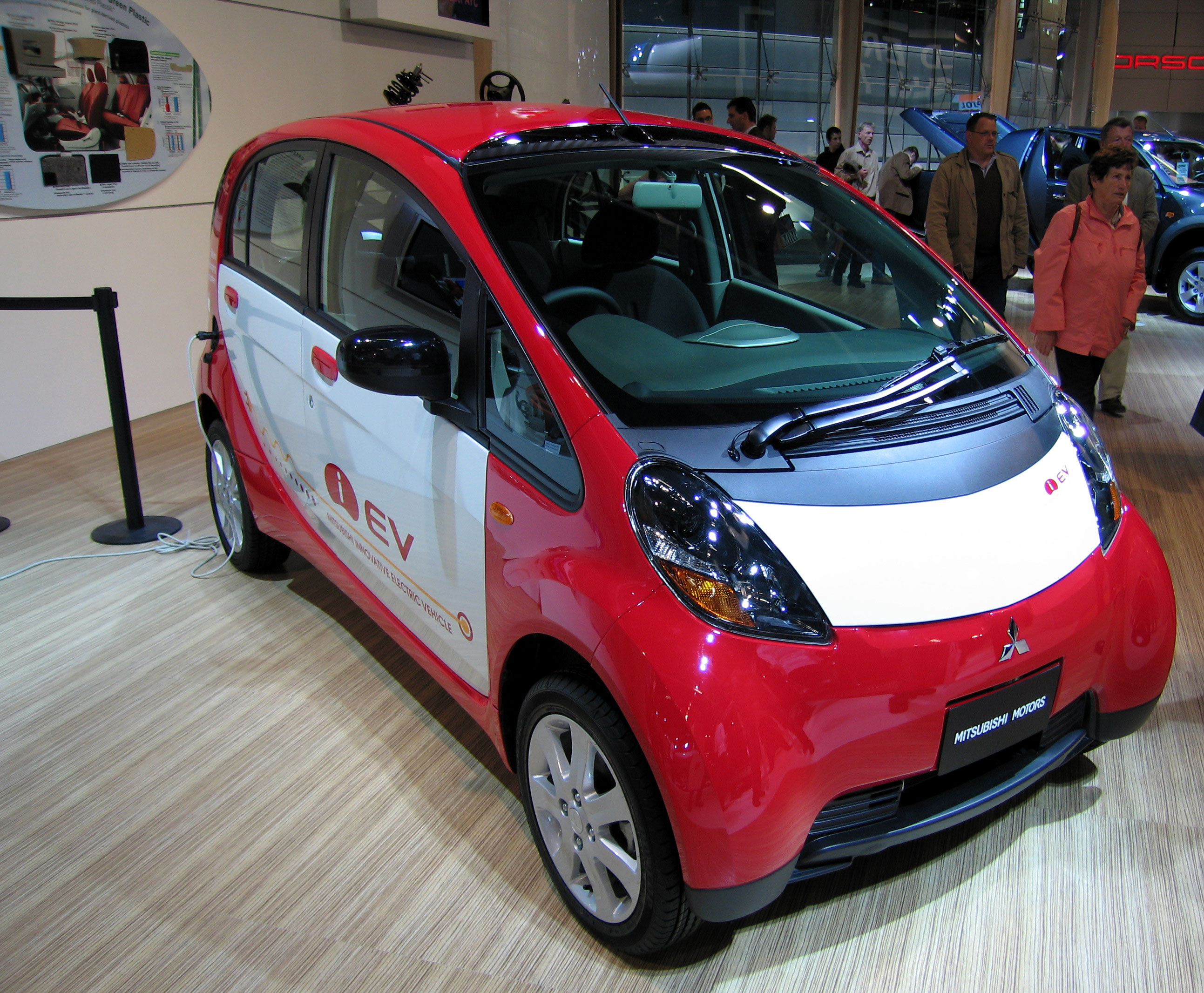
A Mitsubishi i-EV pictured at the Frankfurt Auto Show in 2007.

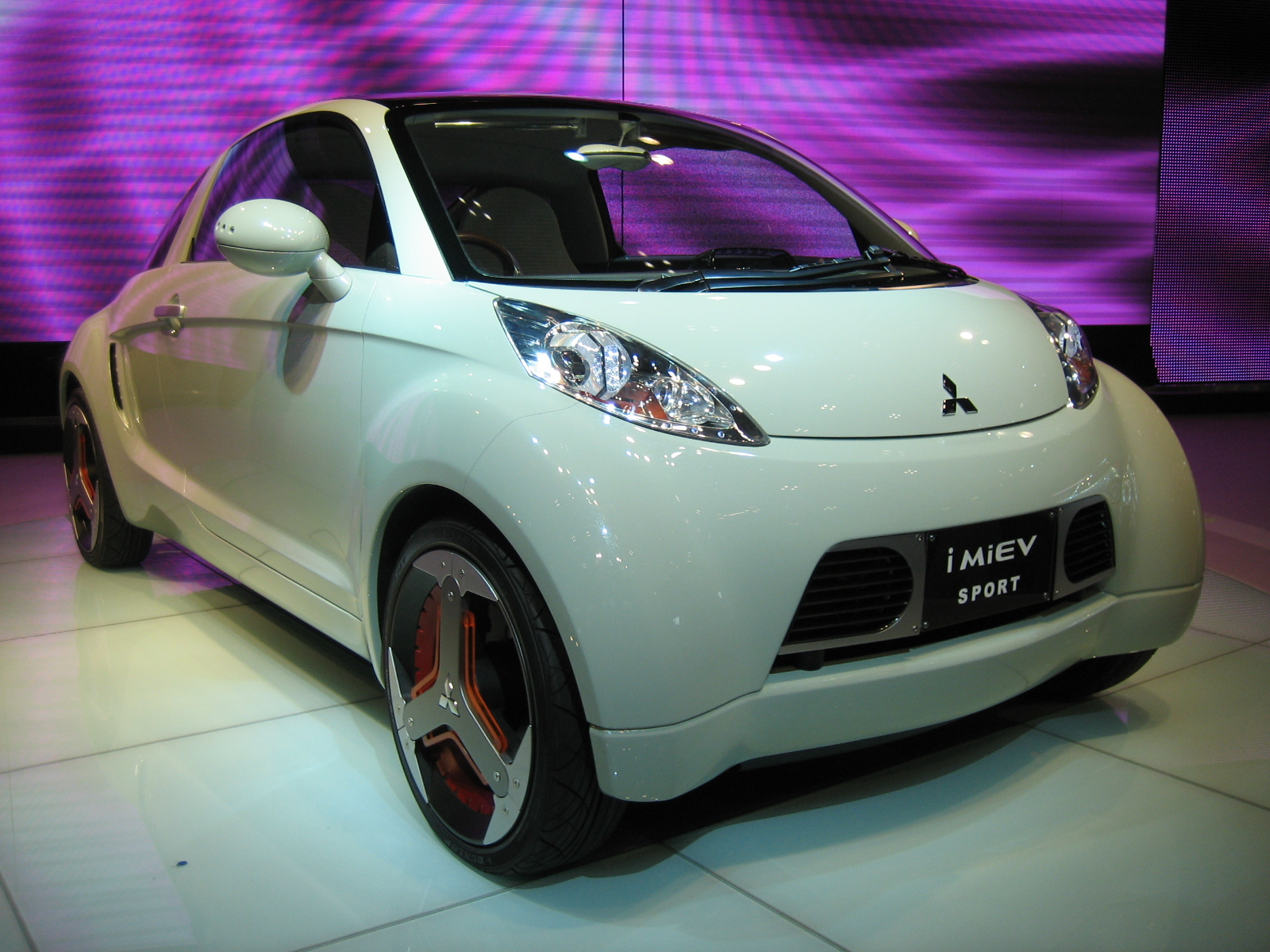
The i MiEV Sport, pictured at the Tokyo Motor Show.

=== Mitsubishi i MiEV (2006) ===
Also based on the Mitsubishi i kei car, it was first exhibited at the 22nd International Battery, Hybrid and Fuel Cell Electric Vehicle Symposium & Exposition in Yokohama. This vehicle was the first where the "i" in MiEV stood for "innovative", as it eschews the in-wheel motors in favour of a more conventional array of batteries, motor and inverter to replace the "rear midship" engine and fuel tank of the conventional car.

Development of the i MiEV EV concept began in 2005. MMC provided three power companies with vehicles in 2006 and 2007 in order to conduct joint research to evaluate how fast-charge infrastructure may be developed for EVs. Fleet testing by five power companies was conducted in 2007. The car has a range of 130 km (81 mi) for the 16 kW·h lithium-ion pack and 160 km (99 mi) for the 20 kW·h pack. Top speed is 130 km/h (81 mph). Also known as the i-EV, it is planned for sale or lease in Japan and other markets in 2009 and 2010 It may also be sold in European markets as the Peugeot iOn and Citroën C-ZERO. (in the European Union in 2010-08-01).

=== Mitsubishi i MiEV Sport (2007) ===
The third concept i Miev based on the platform of the Mitsubishi i, and exhibited at the 40th Tokyo Motor Show in late 2007. In-wheel motors made a return in the front wheels, while a single motor powers the rears. Designed to showcase the sporting potential of zero-emissions vehicles, the i's space efficient exterior design was heavily modified into a more aerodynamic 2+2 fastback silhouette. The company's Super All Wheel Control (S-AWC) system developed for the new Mitsubishi Lancer Evolution X was also utilized.

=== Production version of Mitsubishi i MiEV (2009) ===
The production version of the MiEV does not have in-wheel motors like the many MIEV concepts shown before. Instead it has a single permanent magnet synchronous motor mounted on the rear axle with a power output of 47 kW (63 hp) and torque output of 180 N⋅m (133 lb⋅ft). Due to the motor specification with low torque and hence for direct-drive high RPM to give the stated power, Mitsubishi also had to put a transmission between the motor and wheels. The car has a stated range of 160 km (99 mi) for the Japan 10-15 mode drive cycle with a 16 kWh lithium-ion battery pack. However, the Hungarian online car magazine Autó Pult has recorded 220 km on a single charge. The car's top speed is limited to 130 km/h (81 mph).

During early 2009 the i MiEV was exhibited in Australia at the Melbourne Motor Show, following which it extensively toured Australia.

During January - March 2009 the i MiEV was brought to New Zealand as part of an electric vehicle trial, which saw the i MiEV travel the length of the country testing infrastructure and demonstrating the vehicle to the public.

On 21 September 2009, the Hong Kong Government announced it will procure the first batch of 10 Mitsubishi electric vehicles - the iMiEV - later in 2009, after various government departments have tested the vehicle in the last 6 months. Hong Kong is the first market in Asia, other than Japan, where iMiEVs will be sold before April 2010.

On January 14, 2009, In Canada, Hydro-Québec and Mitsubishi signed an agreement to test 50 i-MiEV, the largest pilot test of electric car in Canada, this test will also allow a better understanding of a winter usage of the technology. BC-Hydro and Mitsubishi had previously tested a 3 vehicle fleet in British Columbia.

In March 2010, it was reported that Mitsubishi i-MiEV will be available in the United Kingdom from January 2011, with a price starting at GBP38,699 (including 17.5% VAT) before deducting incentive of GBP5,000 from the government, to become one of the first battery cars on the market.

In May 2010, Ireland’s first ecar trial-project will be conducted by Trinity College Dublin’s School of Engineering on behalf of ESB was also announced.

The car will be tested in consumer situations the U.S. State of Oregon.

In October 2010 The Government of Canada and Mitsubishi Motor Sales of Canada Inc. (MMSCAN) announced a partnership to test the Mitsubishi i-MiEV (Innovative Electric Vehicle) in Canada. Transport Canada’s for Vehicles (eTV) program will test two i-MiEVs in government facilities, as well as in a variety of real-world conditions, to evaluate the vehicle’s road handling, performance and range. Test results will also help to assess the potential environmental benefits of electric vehicle technologies in Canada.

Mar 4, 2011 - The new generation electric vehicle i-MiEV has been adopted as an electric vehicle to be provided to the Estonian Government from Mitsubishi Corporation. This scale of i-MiEV provision, 507 units has been the largest inquiry MMC has ever received since its sales started. It also marks the first case of provision of electric vehicles under the Green Investment Scheme (GIS).

==== Awards ====
- Japan Car of the Year 2009-2010 Most Advanced Technology Award
