= Start-stop system =

Feature of internal combustion engine vehicles

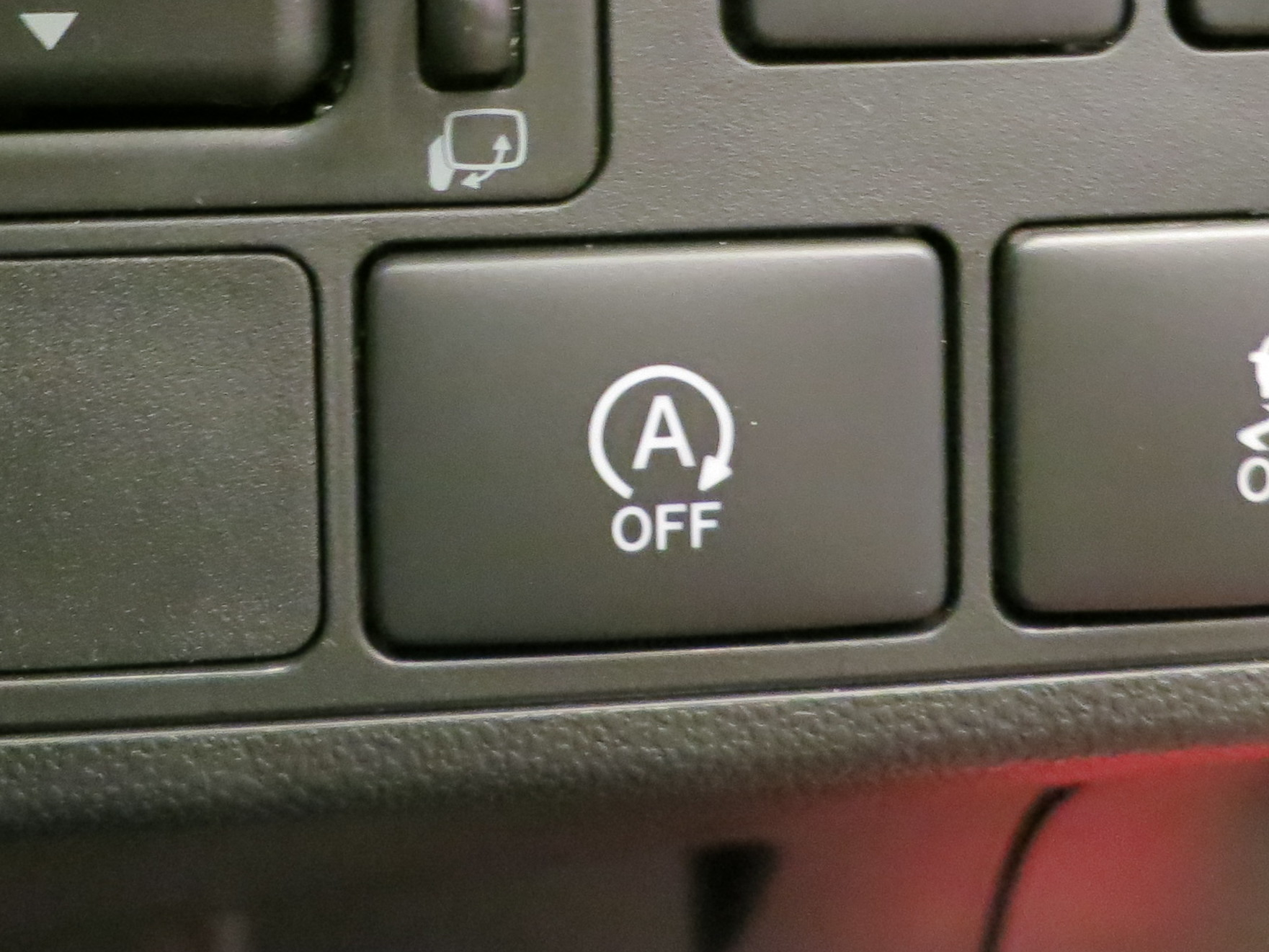
A start-stop system off button on a Perodua Myvi

A start-stop system (also referred to as idling stop or micro hybrid) is a technology that automatically shuts down and restarts a vehicle's internal combustion engine to reduce idle time, with the aim of lowering fuel consumption and emissions. The system is most beneficial in urban environments, where vehicles frequently stop and start, such as at traffic lights or in congestion.

Originally developed for hybrid electric vehicles, start-stop systems are now found in a range of conventional vehicles without hybrid powertrains. Reported fuel economy improvements for non-hybrid vehicles range from 3–10%, with some estimates as high as 12%. According to the United States Department of Energy, idling in the United States consumes more than 6 billion U.S. gallons (23 billion liters; 5.0 billion imperial gallons) of fuel annually.

Start-stop operation varies by vehicle type. In manual transmission vehicles, the system typically activates when the gear is in neutral and the clutch is released, and restarts the engine when the clutch is pressed. Automatic systems monitor engine load and accessory demand, and may override stop-start functionality under certain conditions, such as use of air conditioning or low battery charge.

To support engine-off functionality, accessories traditionally powered by a serpentine belt—such as air conditioning compressors and water pumps—may be redesigned to run electrically. Some vehicles, such as the Mazda3 equipped with the i-ELOOP system, use a supercapacitor to temporarily power accessories when the engine is off.

Start-stop technology has also been implemented in two-wheel vehicles, such as Honda scooters sold in Asian and European markets.

== Characteristics ==
Start-stop technology was introduced in Europe first because of regulatory differences: 25 percent of the New European Driving Cycle (NEDC) is spent idling, while only an estimated 11 percent of the United States Environmental Protection Agency (EPA) test is spent idling. Start-stop activation depends on specific driver inputs as well as operating conditions. The engine must have reached the proper temperature to ensure adequate light-off of its catalytic converter and proper lubrication for an effortless restart.

In a car with a manual transmission, engine shutdown typically occurs when braking to a complete stop, shifting the gearbox to neutral, and releasing the clutch. Cars with automatic transmissions shut down upon braking to a full stop; the shutdown is activated by pressing the foot brake pedal when the car comes to a halt. If the car is slowed initially by manual use of the automatic gearbox and final stoppage is achieved by using the handbrake, the engine will not shut down.

A start-stop system only shuts down the engine when it is warm. Most of an engine's wear occurs during cold starts, so the system avoids unnecessary shut downs when the engine is still cold.

== Enhanced component ==
The system needs to be implemented in conjunction with modifications and reinforcements on many of the car's components in order to reinforce the engine and electrical system durability and long-term wear resistance, as added stopping and starting cycles impose increased loads on those systems. To accomplish similar levels of durability, comfort and user experience to that of older cars without the system, the car's manufacturer can include any of the following enhancements in the car's industrial design:

- The engine main (crankshaft) bearings are coated with special polymers that have properties of dry lubricants, such as polyamide. This aids the lack of the motor oil film and hydrodynamic lubrication when the crankshaft stops, preventing metal-to-metal contact that would otherwise produce accelerated wear on the bearing surfaces.
- The main battery is either absorbent glass mat (AGM) or enhanced flooded battery (EFB) technology, both supporting an increased number of charging cycles and increased load. This is important because all the car's electrical system must be maintained by the battery after the alternator stops generating current. Often the battery will be labeled as supporting or specifically designed for start-stop.
- The starter is reinforced and designed to withstand continuous use without wearing too fast or overheating.
- An independent cooling circuit is added in conjunction with an electrical runoff water pump that keeps on running when the main mechanical pump goes out. This ensures the coolant supply to heat sensitive engine components like turbocharger bearings and to keep cabin temperature in wintertime.
- Special sensors and engine control units (ECUs) can be added to ensure proper system running conditions, and to keep parameters between tolerance like a good battery charge, essential to guarantee future starts.

== History ==
Carbon monoxide emissions and the fuel shortage/oil crisis of the 1970s pushed car manufacturers to find solutions to reduce gas consumption. The first vehicle to use the automatic on/off switch was the six-cylinder Toyota Crown in 1974 and was already claiming a 10% gas saving in traffic. In the 1980s, the Fiat Regata "ES" with the City-matic system and Volkswagen Polo "Formel E" also used similar devices. The Volkswagen Group also adopted it in the Golf Ecomatic in 1994 and in the Volkswagen Lupo "3L" and the Audi A2 "3L" in 1999. Though these early implementations were considered rather disconcerting by many drivers, and high pricing failed to yield these cars much commercial success, both the Volkswagen Lupo and the Audi A2 (in their "3 litre" leverage) were more efficient than any production car available in the US at the time of their release.

Since European emission standard Euro 5, more and more vehicles include a start-stop system, whatever the price level, as reducing idling also reduces vehicles' emissions of CO_{2}, a prime cause of global warming.

Manufacturers continued to refine the system. In 2010, Valeo declared that its second Start-Stop generation would appear in the same year. This new generation would be called "i-StARS".The Valeo system is included in Citroën, Land Rover, Peugeot, Smart, and Volvo, while the Bosch system is included in Fiat, Nissan, SEAT, and Volkswagen, with various motorization including essence and diesel. Bosch developed a system for automatic cars.

The Mazda Smart Idle Stop System (SISS) uses combustion start instead of electrical start. By sensing the position of the pistons in the cylinders, the engine is stopped in a configuration that allows immediate starting by combustion. Mazda claims quieter and quicker engine restart within 0.35 seconds.

The Kia ISG EcoDynamics system uses Bosch, Valeo, and Varta components.

== Manufacturers ==
=== Alexander Dennis ===
Some Alexander Dennis Enviro200 MMC and Enviro400 MMC buses are equipped with stop-start systems that will stop the engine at bus stops.

=== Bentley ===
Stop-start technology was fitted to a Bentley for the first time in 2016 on the Bentayga model. Bentley's system stops the engine when the car is stopped or moving slowly.

=== BMW ===
BMW is including the technology across many of its cars and the MINI line for 2008 as part of its Efficient Dynamics brand. BMW has been interested in ways to reduce parasitic losses on engines, so the company took the technology a step further. Instead of using an Integrated Starter Generator (ISG), BMW has used an enhanced starter which is a conventional starter, developed by Robert Bosch GmbH, that can withstand the increased number of engine-starts in a stop-start vehicle.

BMW has developed the system such that the alternator is not activated most of the time. This means that electrical components in the vehicle are normally running on battery power. When the battery needs to be charged or when decelerating or braking, the alternator is activated to recharge the battery (regenerative braking). Since this battery experiences very different load characteristics than a normal car battery, BMW used an absorptive glass mat (AGM) type instead.

Due to the use of regenerative braking, some have started calling this type of system a micro hybrid, a step below a mild hybrid system where the ISG can be used to assist the engine or even drive the vehicle.

=== Citroën ===
Citroën introduced a more refined system in its C2 and C3 models by 2006, named "Stop and Start". The Citroën implementation combines a SensoDrive automated gearbox and an electronically controlled reversible alternator or integrated starter-generator (ISG). An ISG, also known as "integrated starter-alternator", combines the role of the starter and alternator into one unit; manufacturers include Valeo and Denso.

=== Daihatsu ===
Daihatsu's "Eco Idle" idling stop mechanism was first installed on some grades of the Daihatsu Move and Move Conte, and gradually became standard for all Daihatsu's kei class vehicles. The system installed in the Mira e:S was the world's first for CVT vehicles with petrol engines. By applying the brakes and automatically stopping the engine when the speed is 7 km/h (4.3 mph) or less, the fuel consumption is improved by increasing the idling stop time. In addition, by reducing the number of dedicated parts, it achieved additional weight reduction and "compactification".

=== Fiat Chrysler Automobiles ===
FCA introduced the Robert Bosch GmbH made system in the end of 2008 in the Fiat 500. Starting in September 2009, Alfa Romeo also introduced this system in its Alfa Romeo Mito series utilising Fiat Powertrain Technologies (FPT) 1.4 L Turbo petrol MultiAir engines.

=== Ford ===
Late in 2010, Ford announced that its start-stop system, already used in its hybrids as well as several mainstream models in Europe, would be introduced in North America with the 2012 models, initially with 4-cylinder engines and later proliferating into V6s and V8s. Eventually, the system became available in all Ford vehicles.

In 2013, it announced that start-stop technology would be brought into the second generation Ford Fusion models, and it built start-stop systems into the Ford F150 2015 model for the first time as a standard feature rather than an option. Formerly, only the 2.7-liter turbocharged V-6 version came with stop-start, which requires a more robust (and expensive) absorbent-glass-mat (AGM) battery that can better handle the constant cycling and the heavier draw from vehicle accessories with the engine off.

=== General Motors ===
In 2008, General Motors released its Chevrolet Tahoe hybrid model with AHS2 two-mode technology, which combines start-stop technology with regenerative braking and electric vehicle mode in certain conditions under 29 mph.

In 2012, General Motors released its Chevrolet Malibu Eco model with eAssist technology, which combines start-stop technology with regenerative braking and electric boost in certain conditions.

In 2014, General Motors announced that the Chevrolet Impala and Malibu would have a (non-eAssist) start-stop system across all models.

=== Honda ===
Honda has been using the start-stop function for over a decade via its IMA mild hybrid system in first-generation Insight models in the Japanese domestic market since 1999 and more recently on the Civic Hybrid.

=== Hyundai ===
While both the Kia Rio and Rio5 share the same new direct-injected four-cylinder 1.6 L engine with its cousin Hyundai Accent/Verna (also newly redesigned for 2012), Hyundai made no mention of this feature in their Accent line. Hyundai 1.4 manual has the ISG (Intelligent Stop & Go) system (in Israel).

=== Jaguar ===
Jaguar's Intelligent Eco Stop/Start was first fitted to the XF and XJ models in 2011 before expanding to the rest of the range.

=== Kia ===
The redesigned 2012 Kia Rio and Rio5 (hatchback) debuted at the 2011 New York Auto Show was announced with their Intelligent Stop and Go (ISG) feature, or stop-start technology.

Kia claims the combination of direct fuel injection and stop-start will offer 30 mpg for city driving and 40 mpg on the highway in both 6 speed manual and automatic transmissions.

=== Land Rover ===
In 2008, Land Rover fitted its Freelander with Stop/Start which could reduce fuel consumption and emissions by up to 10%. As of 2016 all Land Rover and Range Rover models are fitted with Intelligent Eco Stop/Start.

=== Mahindra & Mahindra ===
Mahindras were the first in India to launch stop-start based Micro Hybrid system in May 2000. This involved home-grown technology and first of its kind component development like Hall sensor based neutral and clutch pedal sensors, and later a joint venture with Bosch for common rail based vehicles.

=== Mazda ===
The i-Stop system, Mazda's first start stop system, detects which piston is in the best position to restart quickest, which is the one in the combustion stroke phase, where air and fuel are in the cylinder, ready to be ignited. The mixture in this cylinder is ignited by the spark plug, forcing that piston down, and with assistance from the starter motor, results in a near instantaneous engine restart time of 0.35 seconds.

In 2011, Mazda announced i-ELOOP, a system which uses a variable-voltage alternator to convert kinetic energy to electric power during deceleration. The energy stored in a double-layer capacitor, is used to supply power needed by vehicle electrical systems. When used in conjunction with Mazda's start-stop system, i-Stop, the company claims fuel savings of up to 10%.

=== Nissan ===
Nissan uses the S-Hybrid (stylized in all caps as "S-HYBRID") brand for their micro hybrid system. The S-Hybrid system is entirely contained within the engine compartment and does not require a traction battery. Vehicles with the S-Hybrid system are equipped with an Energy Control (ECO) motor, which serves as the gasoline engine's alternator and starter motor. These vehicles are also equipped with an additional "sub-battery" located in the engine compartment to power the vehicle's electric accessories when the gasoline engine has shut down, instead of using a constantly-driven alternator. When the driver lifts off the throttle or brakes, the ECO motor is driven as an alternator to maintain "sub-battery" charge. In addition to being used to restart the engine, the ECO motor also applies 50 N⋅m (5.1 kg⋅m; 37 lb⋅ft) of torque for one second to the crankshaft when driving away from a stop, providing a small amount of electric motor assist.

=== Opel/Vauxhall ===
In 2010, Opel introduced Start/stop in their EcoFLEX branded models. The system is used with Family 0, Ecotec and MGE petrol and MultiJet, Circle L, and Family B diesel engines.

=== Perodua ===
Perodua first introduced the start/stop system in 2016 which is called "Eco idle" in the Bezza. Initially, it was only limited to the range-topping Advance variant. Subsequently, newer models such as the Myvi, Aruz, Ativa, and Alza started to feature this system as standard, even on base models.

=== Renault ===
Renault introduced the technology in all of its European models in 2010.

=== Roewe ===
In 2009, Roewe's Rover 75 based 750 was fitted with stop-start as standard with the hybrid 1.8 Rover K-series engine.

=== SAAB ===
A start-stop function was fitted to the second-generation 9-5 in 2009. The button to control the system was placed next to the gearshift like SAAB ignition keys of old.

=== Subaru ===
Many Subaru vehicles have been equipped with an automatic stop-start system. It was first launched in 2011 for the Impreza and Crosstrek.

=== Suzuki ===
Suzuki's start-stop system is called EASS (Engine Auto Start Stop).

Some car makers such as Suzuki have one additional small 12V lithium-ion battery inside the car. The system is marketed as "SHVS Mild Hybrid System" (Smart Hybrid Vehicle by Suzuki) and available as an option in Ignis, Swift, Baleno in several markets.

=== Tata ===
Tata Motors introduced this system on its LCV Tata Ace.

=== Toyota ===
Toyota showed a prototype of its six-cylinder Toyota Crown equipped with an automatic on/off switch in 1974, claiming a 10-percent gas saving in traffic.

More recently, Toyota has been selling cars with start-stop system on their internal combustion engine vehicles since 2009, and since 1997 in their Prius hybrid line. Both Toyota and Mazda introduced stop-start technology, available also outside of Japan, in some of their 2009 model year vehicles.

=== Volkswagen ===
Volkswagen began using start-stop systems with the Polo Formel E with SSA around 1983, after having previewed the system on the 1981 Auto 2000 research car. Later the LUPO 3L, and after that in the Polo, Golf and Passat BlueMotion, which also include weight and aerodynamic improvements. The system is now commonplace in the Volkswagen range, fitted to all vehicles with the Bluemotion Technology package, though certain other models have the technology too. For the Lupo 3L, with an automated manual gearbox and clutch, the engine stops four seconds after the car becomes stationary with the driver's foot on the brake pedal. No other action is necessary. Removing the foot from the brake pedal initiates engine start and the car can be driven away. The gear lever remains in the drive D position throughout. The same applies to the Audi A2 1.2TDi, which is almost identical mechanically.

=== Volvo ===
Volvo introduced its start-stop technology in 2009 under their DRIVe branding.

=== Mitsubishi ===
Mitsubishi Motors introduced this system in 1999 under its AS&G (Auto Stop & Go) branding, on their kei-car Mitsubishi Pistachio. Mitsubishi has been marketing AS&G Technology in its ClearTec branded models in the European market since 2008. AS&G system is also available on Mitsubishi Colt (EU), which went on sale in Europe in 2008. Since 2010, this system has also been used in the Mitsubishi ASX (EU). In 2015, AS&G was added to the Mitsubishi Eclipse Cross.

== Concerns ==
Hybrid/electric assist vehicles experience almost no delay in power from a stop, thanks to the instant availability of power from the battery to the electric motors. Gasoline and microhybrid vehicles, on the other hand, generally experience slight delays (albeit fractions of a second).

In February 2001, the US National Highway Traffic Safety Administration (NHTSA) raised questions about non-hybrid Honda vehicles equipped with the company's "Idle Stop" transmissions due to concerns over the "sudden lurching forward of a vehicle in an automatic restart" – rather than the "gradual creeping forward found in current transmission designs".

The US Environmental Protection Agency offers gas mileage rating incentives to car manufacturers who ensure their auto stop-start systems default to the "on" position. If the system is "non-latching" (i.e., it does not stay off after the car is switched off), the EPA only calculates fuel economy figures when the system is engaged. If the car manufacturer allows the system to be permanently disabled, then the EPA tests the fuel economy with the system both on and off, then averages the two fuel economy figures. Since that average will always be lower than the economy with the system engaged, car manufacturers choose to switch it back on when the vehicle is restarted, which some operators find inconvenient.

== See also ==
- Idle reduction
- Microcar
