= Mitsubishi TETRA =

Overview
- Manufacturer: Mitsubishi Motors
- Production: 1997

Body and chassis
- Class: Concept car
- Body style: 5-door SUV
- Layout: Front engine, 4WD
- Related: Mitsubishi Legnum

Powertrain
- Engine: 3.0 L GDI V6
- Transmission: 5-speed automatic

Dimensions
- Length: 4,505 mm (177.4 in)
- Width: 1,855 mm (73.0 in)
- Height: 1,645 mm (64.8 in)

The Mitsubishi TETRA is a concept car developed by Japanese automaker Mitsubishi Motors. It was first exhibited at the 57th Frankfurt Motor Show in 1997 as the Mitsubishi Technas, before being displayed at the 32nd Tokyo Motor Show as the TETRA later the same year. The name is an acronym of "Thoroughbred styling Ergonomic multi function interior Technologically advanced sporty performance RISE & All-round information system".

The TETRA was an attempt to combine the traditional benefits of a sports utility vehicle with the more performance-biased handling of a car, by lowering the ground clearance and overall height, and thereby the center of gravity, while using a wide track and wide, low profile tires.

Under the skin, it utilised a 6G72 24-valve 3.0-litre DOHC V6 with gasoline direct injection, mated to an INVECS-II five-speed automatic transmission. The electronically controlled, full-time four-wheel drive system was heavily based on that of the high performance Legnum VR-4 wagon, incorporating a center differential and Active Yaw Control (AYC). The same car was the donor of the four wheel multi-link suspension, rear self-levelling mechanism, and RISE (Reinforced Impact Safety Evolution) passive safety construction.

Styling details included a vertically split rear tailgate, center-opening suicide doors at the rear, and a two-piece split-opening hood.
