= Junie =

- Gender: Unisex
- Language: English

Origin
- Languages: English, Latin
- Origin: 1. Junius; 2. June
- Region of origin: English-speaking world

Other names
- Variant form: Juni
- Related names: Junius, Junior, Juniper, June, Juno, Junot

Junie is a given name and nickname.

== Notable people with the given name include ==
- Junie Anthony (born 1968), West Indian cricketer
- Junie Barnes (1911–1963), American baseball player
- Junius Junie Chatman (born 1956), American professional tennis player
- Junius Junie Cobb (1896–1970), American jazz multi-instrumentalist and bandleader
- Junie Hoang (born 1971), plaintiff in Hoang v. Amazon.com, Inc.
- Junie Joseph (born 1985 or 1986), American attorney and politician
- Junie Lewis (born 1966), American basketball player
- Junie Mitchum (born 1973), West Indies cricketer
- Junie Morosi (born 1933), Australian businesswoman
- Junie Sandgren (born 2004), Swedish actress and director
- Junie Sng (born 1964), Singaporean swimmer

== Notable people with the nickname include ==
- Ernie Andres (1918–2008), American baseball player
- Junie Astor (1911–1967), French actress
- Junie Booth (1948–2021), American jazz bassist
- Wesley "Junie" Donlavey (1924–2014), former NASCAR Sprint Cup Series car owner with a team based in Richmond
- John "Junie" Hovious (1919–1998), American football player
- Marcelino Antonio Maralit (born 1969), Filipino bishop
- Walter "Junie" Morrison (1954–2017), American funk musician
- William "Junie" Sanders (born 1972), American basketball player
- Maia Wright (born 1997), Swedish singer also known as Junie

== Fictional characters ==
- Junie B. Jones, fictional character in a children's series written by Barbara Park

== See also ==
- Junie 5, 1981 solo album recorded by multi-instrumentalist Walter "Junie" Morrison
- Tell Me That You Love Me, Junie Moon, 1970 film directed by Otto Preminger
- Junie (novel), 2025 novel by Erin Crosby Eckstine
