= Jouanneau =

Jouanneau is a surname. Notable people with the surname include:

- Daniel Jouanneau (born 1946), French diplomat and statesman
- Jacques Jouanneau (1926–2011), French actor
- Paul Jouanneau (born 1959), Brazilian freestyle swimmer

== See also ==
- Juneau (surname)
