= Juno Beach (disambiguation) =

Juno Beach was an Allied landing site in France during the Second World War.

Juno Beach may also refer to:

- Juno Beach Centre, a museum located close to the Second World War landing site
- Juno Beach Academy of Canadian Studies, a school named in honour of the famous Second World War landing site
- Juno Beach, Florida, USA, a town in Palm Beach County

== See also ==
- Juno (disambiguation)
- Juneau (disambiguation)
