= Mitsubishi ME21/24 engine =

ME21/24
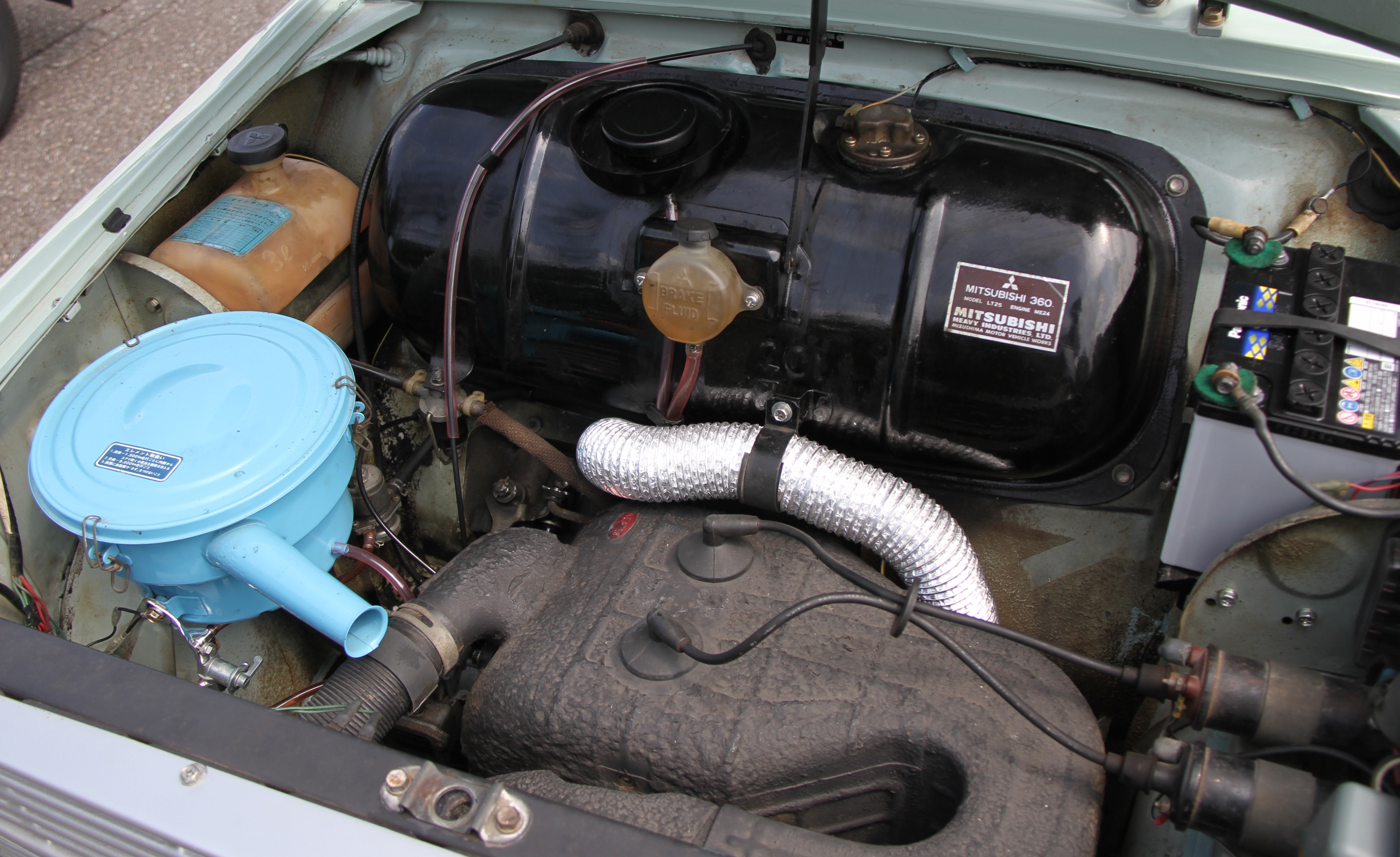
- ME24D engine in a Mitsubishi 360 (LT25)

Overview
- Manufacturer: Mitsubishi Motors
- Also called: "Yellow" engine
- Production: 1961–72

Layout
- Configuration: air-cooled two-stroke I2
- Displacement: 359 cc
- Cylinder bore: 62.0 mm
- Piston stroke: 59.6 mm

Chronology
- Predecessor: ME20 engine
- Successor: Mitsubishi 2G1 engine

The ME21/24 engine was Shin Mitsubishi Heavy-Industries' (one of the three divisions of Mitsubishi Heavy Industries until their consolidation in 1964) replacement for the 309 cc single-cylinder overhead valve ME20 engine. Unlike its predecessor, this was a two-stroke, a concept to which Mitsubishi was to prove faithful for its smallest engines until the 1972 introduction of the Vulcan 2G21.

== General ==
The naming of Mitsubishi engines after the dissolution of the Zaibatsu reflected which factory they were built in. M stood for the Mizushima plant, E for engine, and 21 for being the 21st engine development by Mizushima, thus "ME21". When the 2G10 engine (a water-cooled version of the ME24) was introduced in late 1968, Mitsubishi's new unified naming convention had taken effect and thus its very different name.

The ME21 was first used in the Mitsubishi 360 light commercial of April 1961, and then in the Minica passenger car. The later ME24 engines were seen in a variety of Mitsubishi's lower end Kei cars and trucks, until production ended in late 1972. Due to ever tighter anti-pollution legislation as well as a more demanding customer base, the air-cooled ME24 eventually made way for more modern engines. When installed in the A100/100V Minicas, the ME24 was referred to as the "Yellow" engine.

== ME21 ==
The 359 cc twin cylinder two-stroke ME21/ME21A was used in the 360 pickup truck and the first generation Minica LA20. Power was only 17 PS (13 kW).

== ME24 ==
A lightly modified ME21 introduced in November 1964, featuring an "Auto Mix" system which made away with the need for pre-mixed gasoline/oil. It also gained one extra horsepower. In May 1967 the 21 PS reed valve ME24D was introduced. Later iterations of the ME24 were used in the base models of the second generation Minica and Minicab until replaced by a detuned version of the "Red" 2G10 engine in late 1972. The ME24E actually soldiered on in the LT30V van version of the first generation until 1976, as this was not updated alongside its truck siblings. Along with assorted other Mitsubishi parts, a 21 PS (15 kW) ME24 engine was also used by Hope Motor Company for their tiny ON360 off-roader, the predecessor to the Suzuki Jimny.

== Specifications ==
	ME21/21A	ME24	ME24D	ME24E	ME24F
Engine type	two-stroke I2		reed valve two-stroke I2		
Displacement	359 cc				
Bore × stroke	62.0 mm × 59.6 mm (2.44 in × 2.35 in)				
Fuel type	Pre-mix	"Auto Mix" oil and gasoline			
Peak power	17 PS (12.5 kW)	18 PS (13.2 kW)	21 PS (15.4 kW)	26 PS (19.1 kW)	30 PS (22.1 kW)
at rpm	4800 rpm		5500 rpm		6000 rpm
Peak torque	27.5 N⋅m (20.3 lb⋅ft)	30.4 N⋅m (22.4 lb⋅ft)	31.4 N⋅m (23.2 lb⋅ft)	35.3 N⋅m (26.0 lb⋅ft)	36.3 N⋅m (26.8 lb⋅ft)
at rpm	3500 rpm	3000 rpm	3500 rpm	4500 rpm	5000 rpm
Compression	8.2:1	7.8:1		8.0:1	
Applications	61.04-64.11 Mitsubishi 360, 62.10-64.11 Mitsubishi Minica	64.11-67.05 Mitsubishi 360/Minica	66.08-71.05 Mitsubishi Minicab, 67.05-69.07 360/Minica, 68.04-? HopeStar ON360	69.07-70.10 Minica A100, 69.07-72.10 Minica Van A100V, ?? Minica Pick, ??-76.03 Mitsubishi Minicab LT30	70.10-72.10 Minica A100, 71.05-72.09 Minicab EL T130/T131, 72.10-?? Mitsubishi Minicab EL Van Super Deluxe LT30

=== Applications ===
- 1961-71 Mitsubishi 360/Minica Pick
- 1962-69 Mitsubishi Minica
- 1968-? HopeStar ON360
- 1969-72 Mitsubishi Minica A100/100V
- 1966-71 Mitsubishi Minicab LT30
- 1968-76 Mitsubishi Minicab LT30V
- 1971-72 Mitsubishi Minicab EL (T130)

== See also ==
- List of Mitsubishi engines
