= Juni =

Juni may refer to:

== People ==
=== Given name ===
- Juni Chakma, Bangladeshi kabaddi player
- Juni Dahr (born 1953), Norwegian actress
- Juni Fisher (born c. 1956), American singer-songwriter

=== Characters ===
- Juni Cortez, character from the Spy Kids series

=== Surname ===
- Juan de Juni (c. 1507–1577), French–Spanish sculptor
- Masoud Juni (1939–1991), Syrian writer
- Peter Jüni, Swiss physician

== Places ==
- Juni, Ghana, a village in the Tamale Metropolitan District in the Northern Region of Ghana
- Juni, Iran, a village in West Azerbaijan Province, Iran
- Juni Lake, a lake in Minnesota

== Other uses ==
- Juni (album), by drummer Peter Erskine
- Juni (restaurant), New York City
- Juni Cortez, a character from the Spy Kids films
- June List (Swedish: Junilistan), a Swedish political party
- June Movement (Danish: Juni Bevægelsen), a Danish political party
- Juni, character from Street Fighter, see list of Street Fighter characters
- Juni Ginkuro (吟黒ジュニ), a multilingual singing voice synthesizer mascot to a series of UTAU software voicebanks, DiffSinger AI diffusion model, and COEIROINK TTS model.
