= Powell Manufacturing Company =

Former auto company in Southern California, USA

Coordinates: 33.9185166°N 118.2225673°W

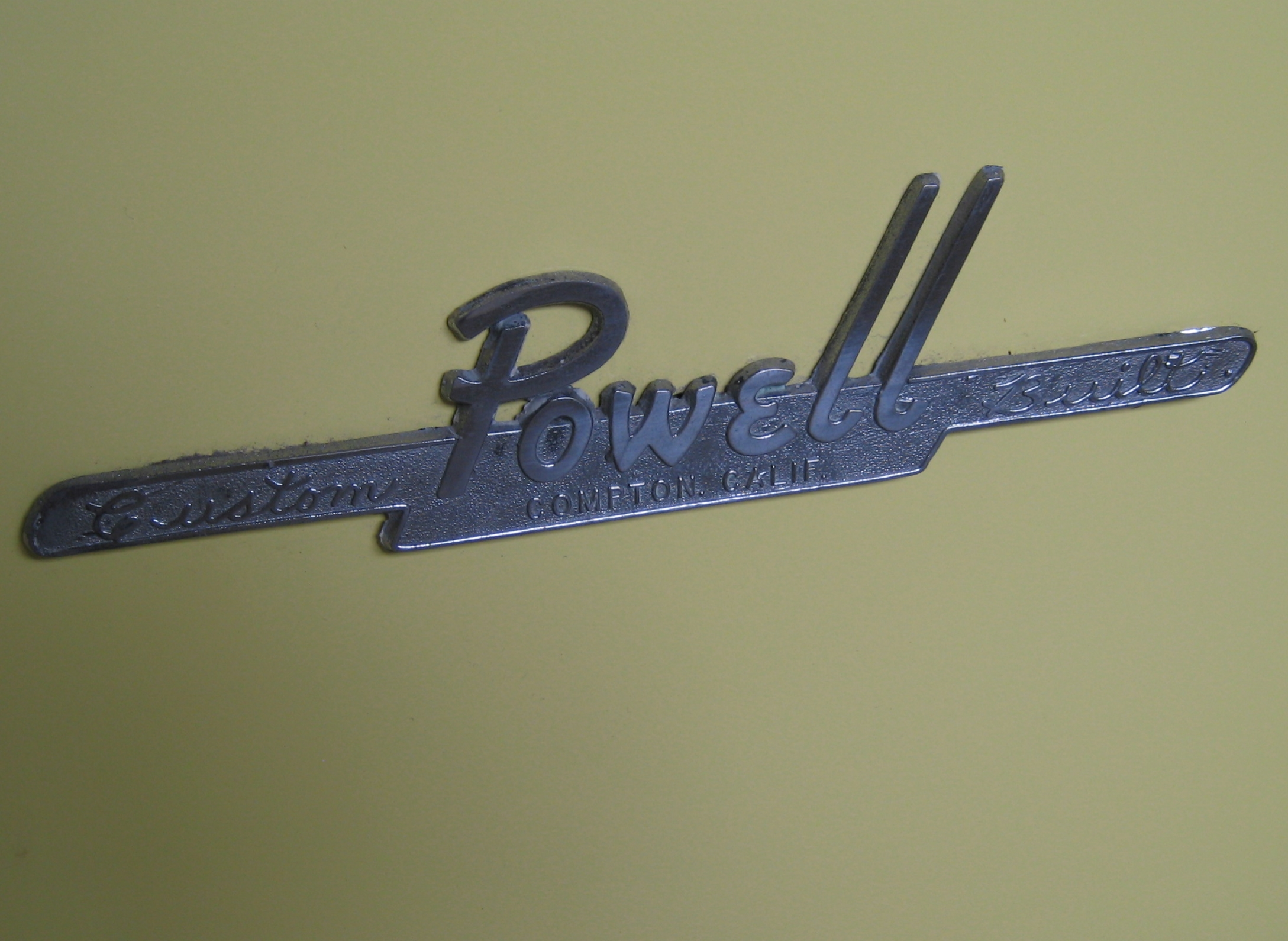
- Founded: 1926; 100 years ago
- Defunct: April 1979
- Headquarters: California

Powell Manufacturing Company (PMC) was a company based in Southern California, widely known for its line of motor scooters that peaked in popularity in the late 1940s. From September 1954 to March 1957, Powell manufactured "Sport Wagon" pickup trucks and station wagons.

In the 1960s and 1970s, they manufactured the "Powell Challenger" trail bikes.

The company originally began operations in 1926, and manufactured radios, then moved on to build around 1,200 pickup trucks, 300 station wagons, three motor homes, and tens of thousands of scooters and trail bikes. Its manufacturing address was listed as 2914 North Alameda Street in Compton, California, which was two miles south of the General Motors South Gate Assembly factory, and it had a showroom listed at 12700 S. Western Avenue.

== History ==
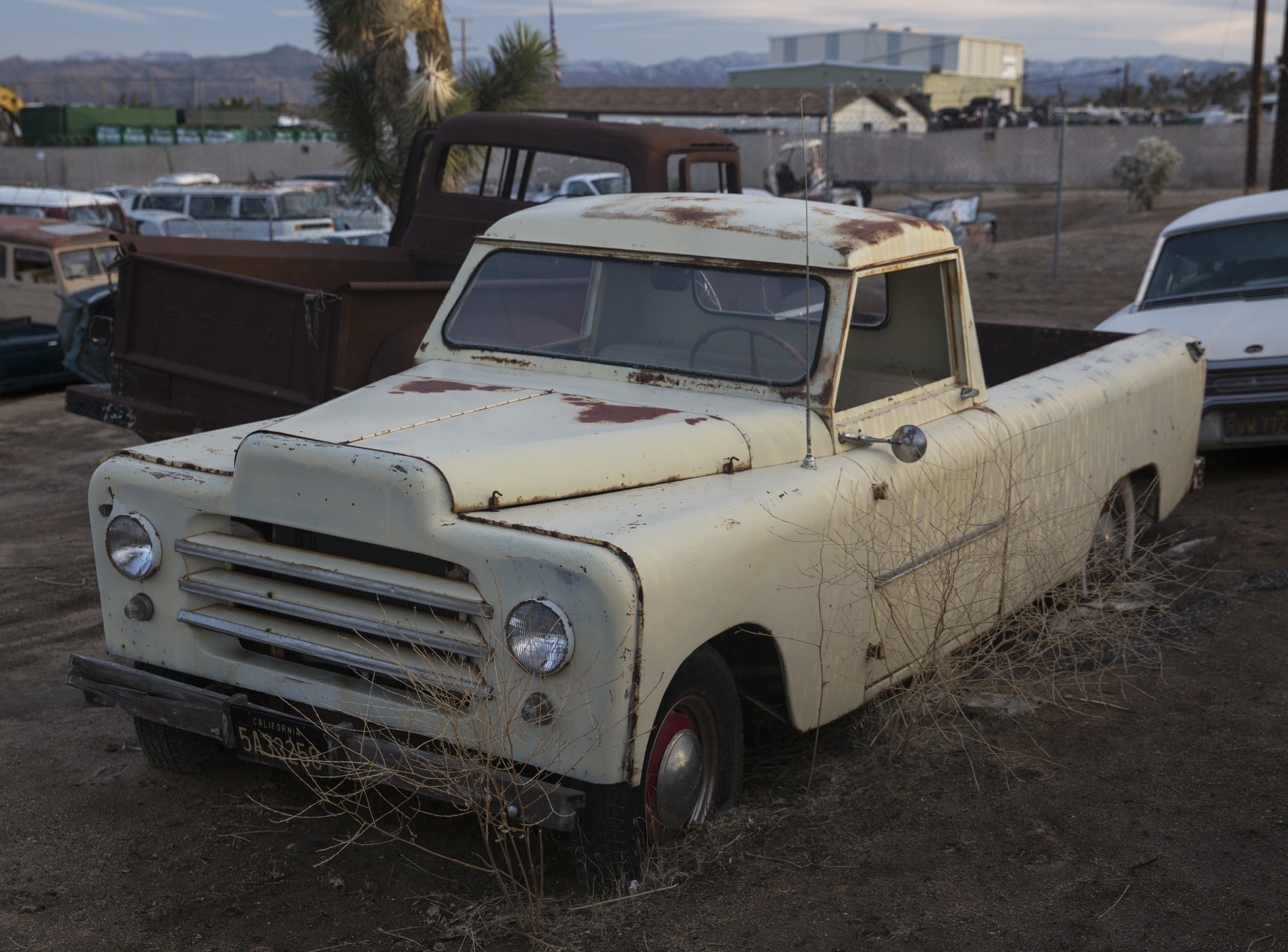

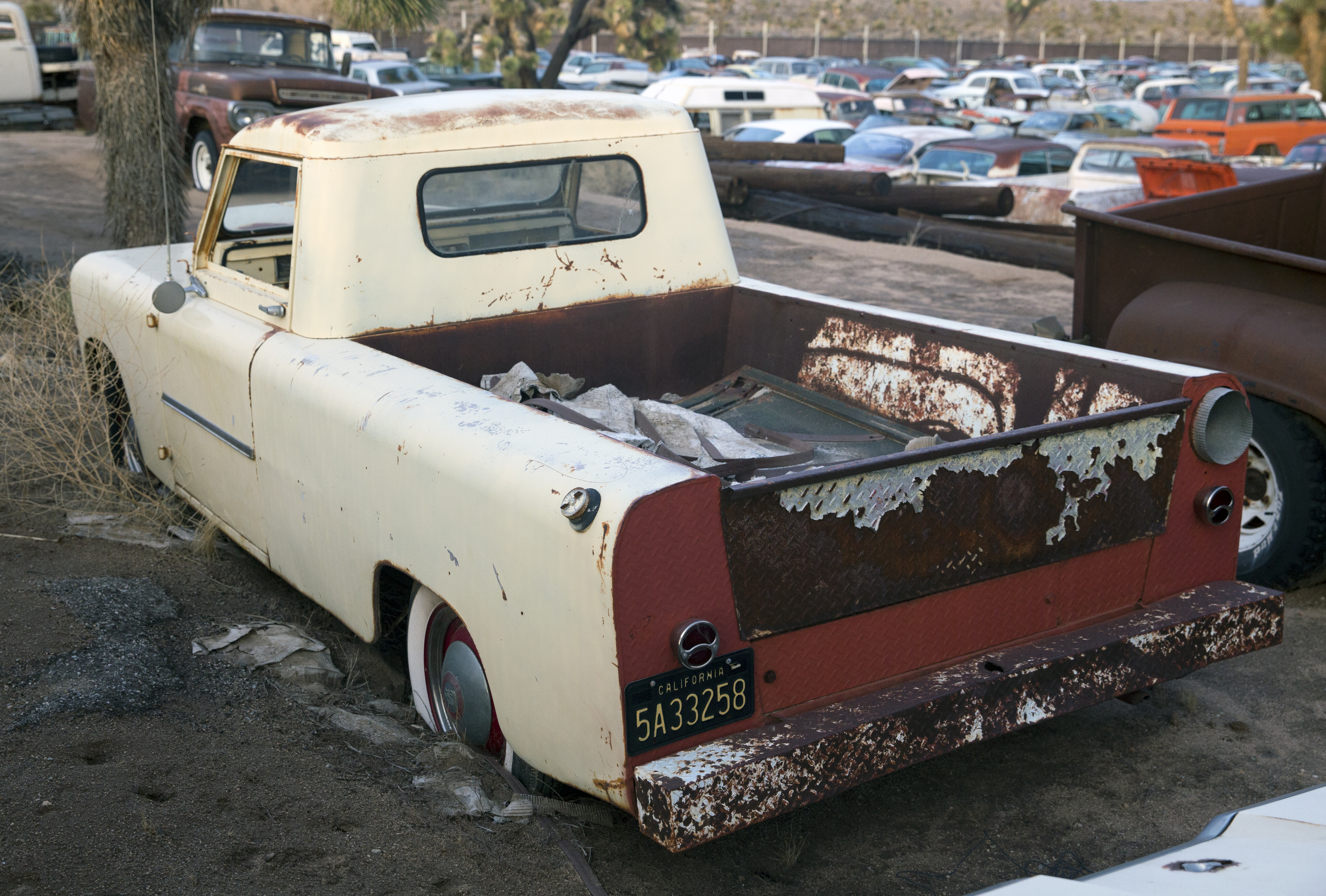
Powell Sport Wagon

The Powell Brothers, Hayward and Channing Powell, started manufacturing radios in the mid-1920s, immediately after they graduated from Manual Arts High School in Los Angeles in 1924. Their first company, Winner Radio, produced expensive radios, which did not sell well, and then inexpensive radios that did.

During 1925, Hayward Powell developed appendicitis and in early 1926 had an appendectomy. During Hayward's recovery, the brothers took a five-month, cross-country trip. When they returned to Los Angeles, they started Powell Manufacturing Company in 1926 to make battery eliminators, soon also making box-style table radios typical of the 1920s.

By 1930, they were part of the reputation of Los Angeles as the "midget capital of the world", making what are now referred to as cathedral-style table radios (midget in comparison to earlier floor-standing consoles and large-box table radios). In 1931, they were also selling the even-smaller "pee-wee" cathedral-style table radios that had become popular. Before they exited the radio business in 1932, they produced an innovative radio that was just 9 inches square and 34 inches high, which was perhaps the forerunner of the chair-side style radios.

In the mid-1930s, they moved into scooter production. The Powell manufacturing facility in Compton, California, switched to war production in 1942. After World War II, Powell again returned to scooter production with the C-47, P-48, and P-49 step-through models. The Powell Streamliner model, used by U.S. Airborne troops during World War II, was copied and served as the basis for the original Fuji Rabbit scooter in June 1946 (6 months before the first Vespa scooter).

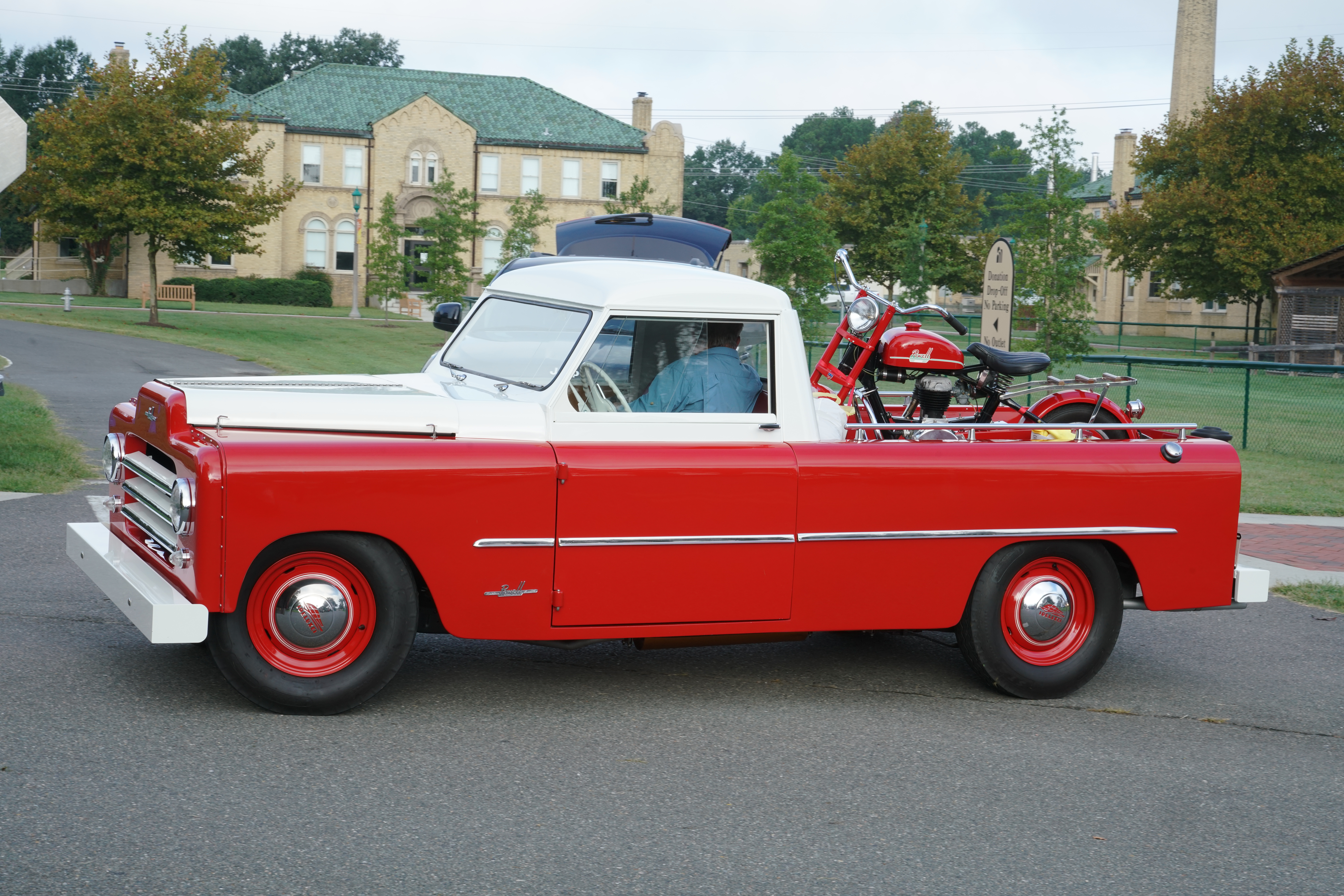
Powell Pickup at the 52nd annual Richmond AACA car show in September 2021

In 1949, the Powell company moved into the lightweight motorcycle market with the introduction of the P-81 model, which was a direct competitor of the Mustang (motorcycle) produced in nearby Glendale. All four of these postwar Powell models used the same single-cylinder, four-stroke, 24-cubic-inch (393 cc) engine, which was developed in-house. Powell again switched to war production for the Korean War in the early 1950s and never returned to scooter production.

PMC was also an early innovator in pickup and SUV design, with several models produced in the 1950s using modified 1941 Plymouth chassis recycled from junkyards. The pickup was sold as the Sport Wagon and the SUV as the Station Wagon. Powell's designs were later echoed in the Ford Ranchero and Chevrolet El Camino models, which appeared a few years later. Motor Life magazine, in its October 1955 issue (with a photo of the Powell Sport Wagon on the cover), called it "an obvious choice as one of the most interesting and unique automobiles in the U.S." In the February 1956 issue of Motor Trend, magazine co-founder Walt Woron concluded his article: "The Powell Brothers, then, have succeeded in their purpose: to provide a vehicle that '... can't be beat for general utility...[that makes] the perfect runabout or 2nd family car...'".

In the 1960s, the company reorganized as Powell Brothers, Inc., and manufactured the "Powell Challenger" trail bikes. During this period, the company relocated to a larger facility at 5903 E. Firestone Boulevard in South Gate, California. Hayward Powell died in March 1978, and with Channing Powell retired, the company officially dissolved and closed its doors in April 1979. Channing Powell died in 1988.
