= Junius =

Junius often refers to:

- Junius (writer), the pseudonym of an 18th-century British political writer of strongly Whig principles
- The nomen of the ancient Roman Junia gens
- Junius or Iunius, the month of June on the ancient Roman calendar
- Rosa Luxemburg's Junius Pamphlet (German: Junius-Broschüre), a nickname for a pamphlet Luxemburg wrote in prison in 1915

Junius may also refer to:

== Surname ==
- Franciscus Junius (the elder) (1545–1602), Huguenot theologian
- Franciscus Junius (the younger) (1591–1677), Germanic philologist
- Hadrianus Junius (1511–1575), also known as Adriaen de Jonghe, Dutch humanist
- Johannes Junius (1573–1628), mayor of Bamberg, and a victim of the Bamberg witch trials
- Robert Junius (1606–1665), Dutch Reformed Church missionary to Taiwan

== Given name ==
- Junius Bassus (fl. 318–331), ancient Roman politician
- Junius Bassus Theotecnius (317–359), Roman politician, son of Junius Bassus
- Junius Bibbs (1910–1980), American baseball infielder in the Negro leagues
- Junius Bird (1907–1982), American archaeologist and curator; possible inspiration for the character Indiana Jones
- Junius Blaesus (died 31), Roman army commander and proconsul of Africa
- Junius Brutus Booth (1796–1852), English actor and father of Abraham Lincoln assassin John Wilkes Booth
- Junius Brutus Booth Jr. (1821–1883), American actor and theatre manager; son of Junius Booth
- Junius Henri Browne (1833-1902), American journalist and Civil War correspondent
- Junius Daniel (1828–1864), American planter and career military officer; Confederate brigadier general in the American Civil War
- Junius Kaʻae (1845–1906), Hawaiian politician
- Junius Marion Futrell (1870–1955), 30th governor of Arkansas
- Junius Hillyer (1807–1886), American lawyer, judge and politician and two-time member of the US House of Representatives from Georgia
- Junius Ho (born 1962), Hong Kong lawyer
- Junius Richard Jayewardene (1906–1996), President of Sri Lanka
- Junius J. Johnson (died 1898), American miner who played a significant role in the Cripple Creek miners' strike of 1894
- Junius Kellogg (1927–1998), American basketball player and member of the Harlem Globetrotters
- Junius Spencer Morgan (1813–1890), American banker and financier, and father of financier J.P. Morgan, Sr.
- Junius Spencer Morgan II (1867–1932), art collector and cousin of J.P. Morgan, Sr.
- Junius Spencer Morgan III (1892–1960), American banker
- Junius W. Peak (1845–1934), Confederate soldier, Dallas city marshall, and Texas Ranger
- Junius Philargyrius, early commentator of the 5th, 6th or 7th century
- Junius Rusticus (c. 100 – c. 170), Stoic philosopher and one of the teachers of Marcus Aurelius
- Junius Scales (1920–2002), a leader of the Communist Party of the United States of America
- Junius Myer Schine (1890–1971), New York theater and hotel magnate
- Junius Rogers (1999-), American rapper and songwriter

== Places ==
- Junius, New York, a town
- Junius, South Dakota, an unincorporated community
- Hughes River (West Virginia), also known historically as the Junius River

== Other uses ==
- Junius (band), an American rock band
  - Junius (album)
- Junius (horse)
