= Hope Motor Company =

Japanese car company

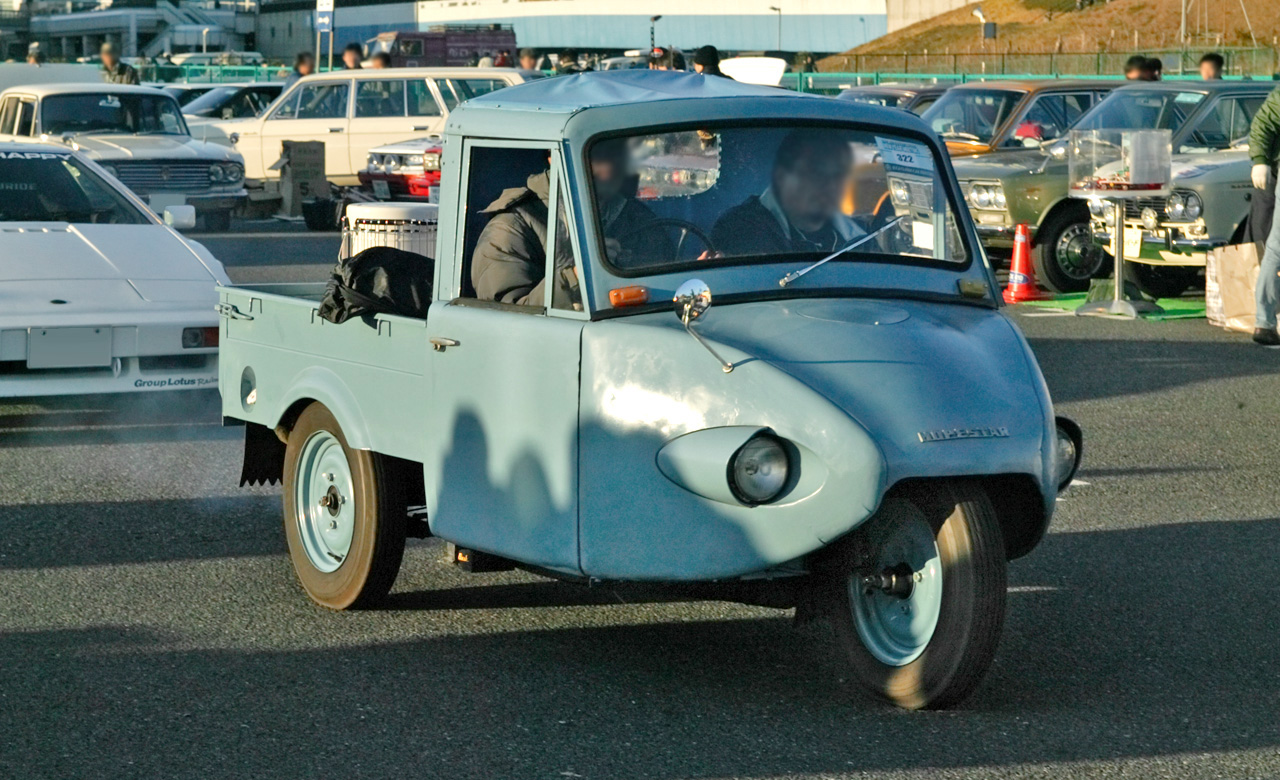
HopeStar SM.

Hope Motor Company was a Japanese car company bought by Suzuki in 1968. In December 1967, they released the HopeStar ON360, with a Mitsubishi 360-cc two-stroke, straight-two ME24 engine producing 21 bhp. The ON360 had a four-wheel drive layout. While 100 engines were purchased from Mitsubishi, most sources state that only 15 ONs were finished, all in 1968. Their earlier model, the HopeStar SM, was affectionately referred to in Japanese as the sanrin (三輪)" or "three wheels".

== HopeStar ON360 ==
The HopeStar ON360 was originally developed in 1967 and was available from April 1968. It used a Mitsubishi 359 cc (21.9 cu in) air-cooled two-stroke ME24 engine, which produced 21 PS (15.4 kW). The rear axle was sourced from the Mitsubishi Colt 1000 and wheels were sourced from the Mitsubishi Jeep. It was a very basic two-seater vehicle with no doors, but a sturdy four-wheel drive system allowed it to go off-road. Top speed was 70 km/h (43 mph), 30 km/h in 4WD mode. The company sold very few ON360s, possibly as few as 15, although 100 ME24 engines were purchased. Hope sold the design to Suzuki, as the Suzuki Jimny, in 1968, after Mitsubishi declined to take over production.

Specs datasheet with technical data and performance data plus an analysis of the direct market competition of HopeStar ON360 (man. 4) in 1968, the model with -door open-top off-road body and Line-2 359 cm3 / 22 cui, 15.5 kW / 21 PS / 21 hp (SAE) offered since April 1968 for Japan. According to the ProfessCars™ estimation. and quarter mile time is 27.8 sec. This car is 2995 mm / 117.9 in long, 1295 mm / 51 in wide and 1765 mm / 69.5 in high.
