= Mitsubishi Silver Pigeon =

Silver Pigeon C-10
- Manufacturer: Mitsubishi Heavy Industries, Ltd.
- Production: 1946–1963
- Class: Scooter
- Engine: 112 cm^{3} (6.8 cu in) 4-stroke, SV air-cooled, single-cylinder
- Bore / stroke: 57 mm × 44 mm (2.2 in × 1.7 in)
- Power: 1.5 hp (1.1 kW) at 3500 rpm
- Transmission: Automatic belt-type CVT
- Tires: 3.50-7 (rear)
- Wheelbase: 935 mm (36.8 in)
- Dimensions: L: 1,550 mm (61 in); W: 560 mm (22 in); H: 1,010 mm (40 in)
- Weight: 70 kg (150 lb) (dry)

The Mitsubishi Silver Pigeon is a series of scooters made in Japan by Mitsubishi between 1946 and 1963. The first was the C-10, based on a scooter imported from the United States by Koujiro Maruyama, which began production at the Nagoya Machinery Works of Mitsubishi Heavy Industries. Along with the Mizushima three-wheeler pickup truck it represented Mitsubishi's first contributions to the Japanese post-war personal transport boom. The Silver Pigeon's primary competitor was the Fuji Rabbit (and in 1954, the Honda Juno). Motor scooters were so important to the post-war vehicle industry that In May 1948 both a Silver Pigeon and a Rabbit were presented to the Emperor of Japan. The Society of Automotive Engineers of Japan (in Japanese) lists the Silver Pigeon C-10 model introduced in 1946 as one of their 240 Landmarks of Japanese Automotive Technology.

The Silver Pigeon proved sufficiently successful to remain in production for almost twenty years. Motor Cyclist magazine voted it "best in styling" for three consecutive years in the 1950s, a decade after its introduction, while from 1950 to 1964 it maintained an average 45 percent share of the domestic scooter market. American retailer Montgomery Ward imported the Silver Pigeon and sold it via their catalog under the Riverside captive import brand. By the time production came to an end in 1963 over 463,000 had been manufactured, with the 1960 C-200 proving the most popular individual model, with almost 38,000 sales.

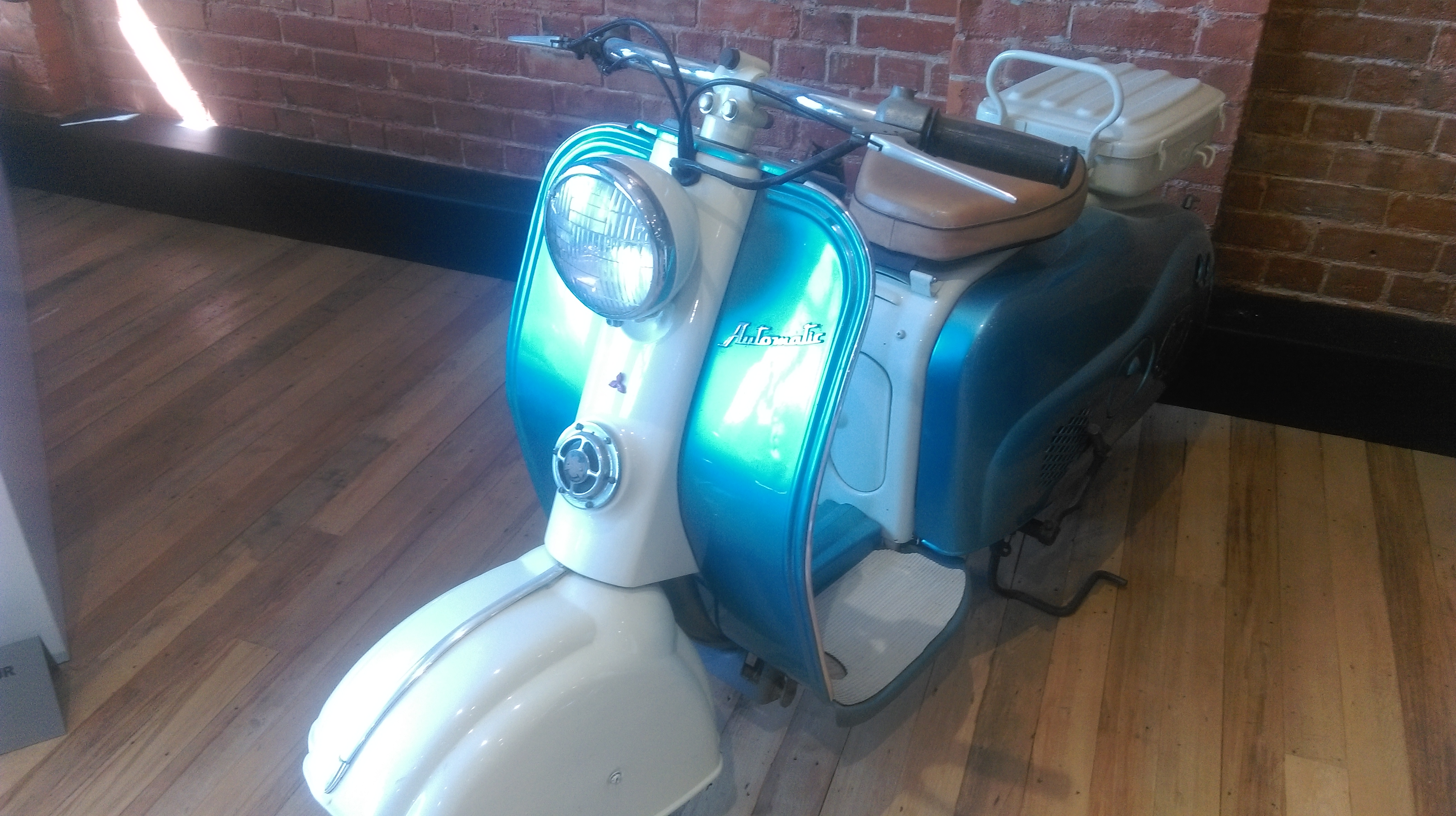
Mitsubishi Silver Pigeon

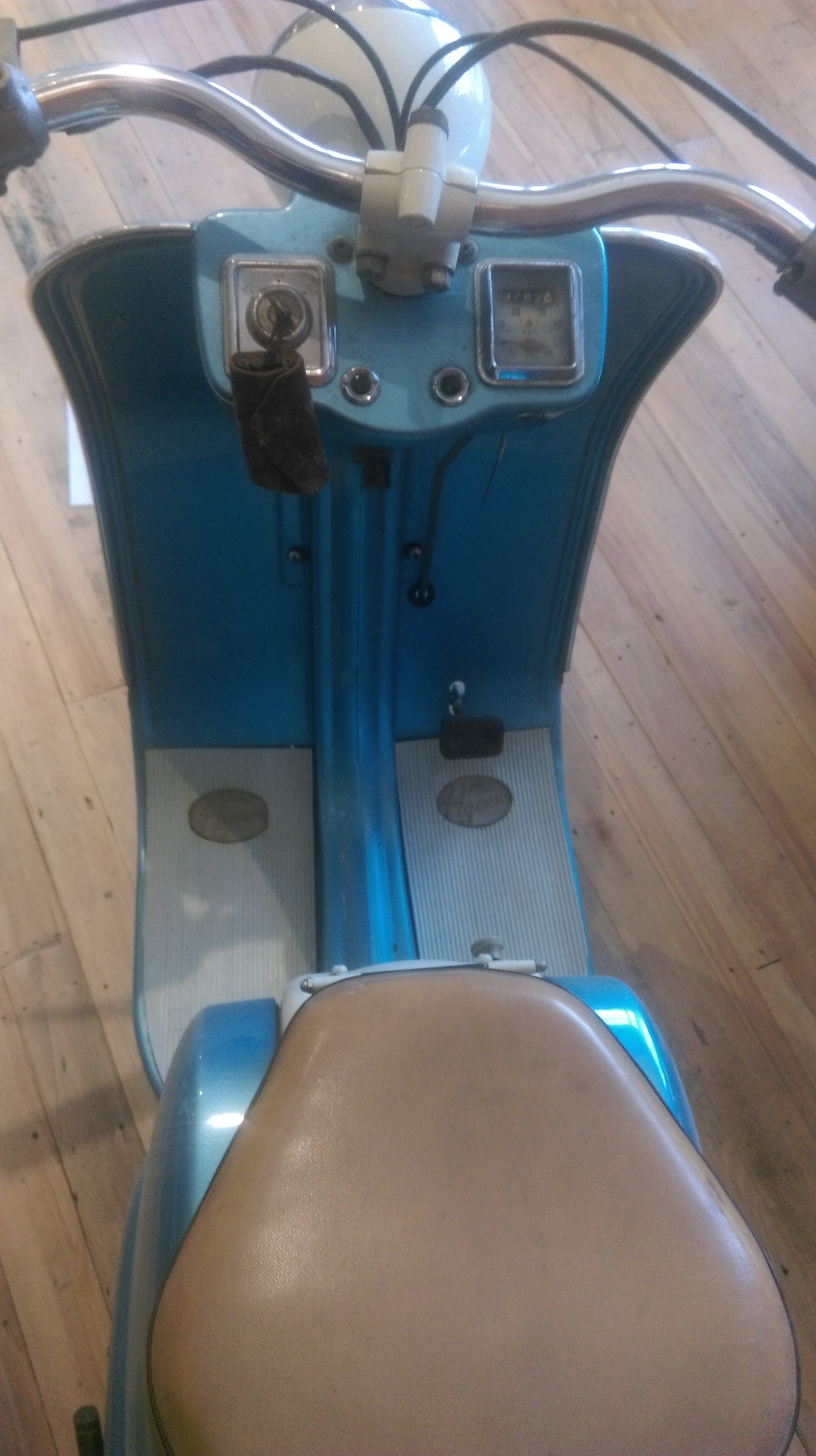
Birds-eye view

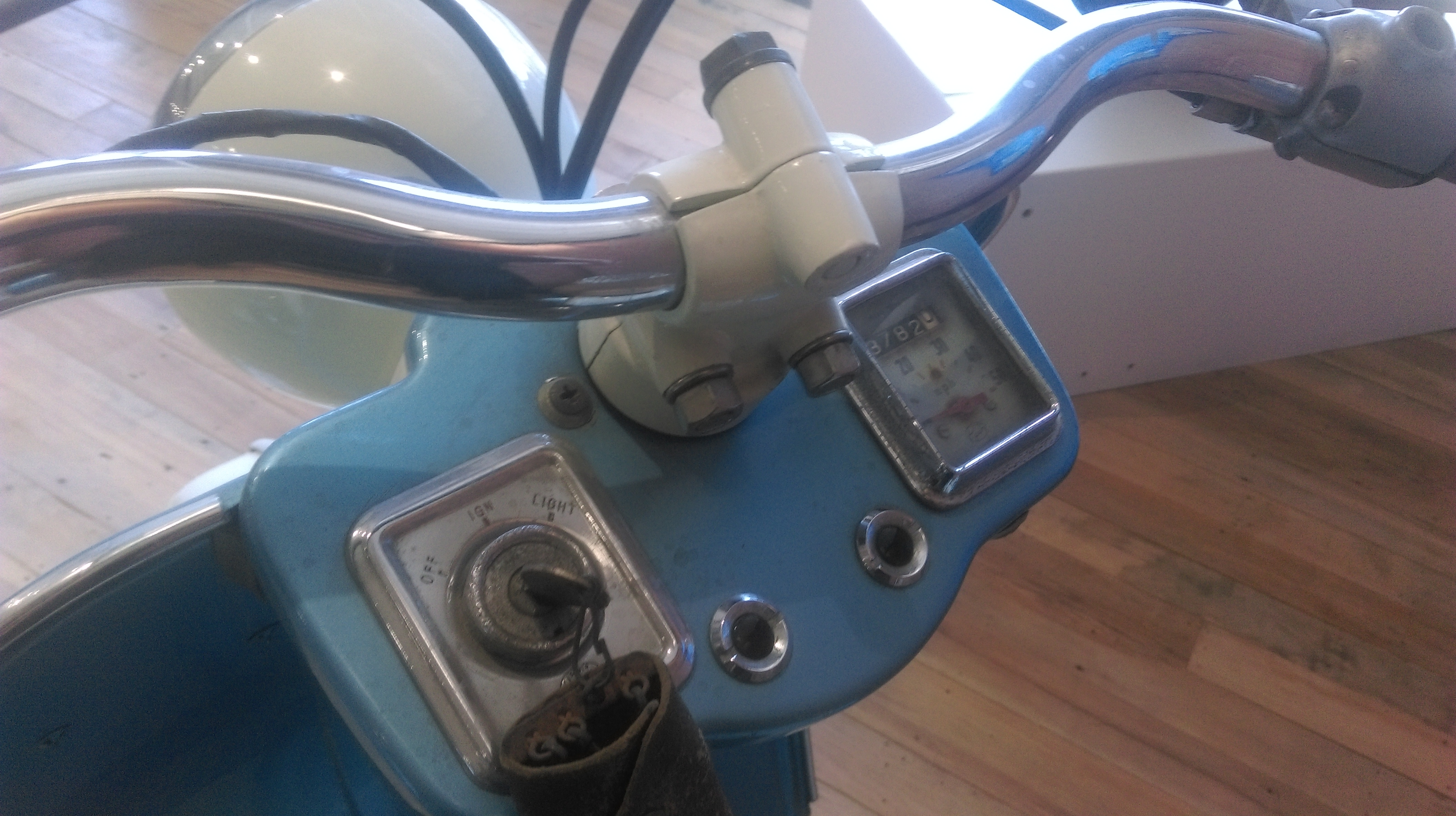
Dashboard

Year	Model	Specification
1946	C-10	NE10 112 cc, 1.5 PS
1948	C-11	
1950	C-25	
1953	C-26	
1955	C-57	192 cc single-cylinder engine
1955	C-70	125 cc two-stroke
1957	C-90	200 cc four-stroke
1958	C-93	210 cc
1960	C-111	210 cc four-stroke
1960	C-200	125 cc two-stroke
1960	C-300	125 cc two-stroke
1960	C-76	192 cc four-stroke
1960	C-110	175 cc
1960	C-300	125 cc two-stroke single-cylinder engine
1961	C-110	175 cc four-stroke, 8.3 hp
1963	C-140	125 cc two-stroke twin cylinder engine, 8 hp, three-speed transmission, 143 kg
1963	C-240	143 cc two-stroke twin cylinder engine, 9.2 hp, three-speed transmission, 143 kg

== See also ==
- List of motorcycles of the 1940s
- List of motorcycles of the 1950s
