= Fuji Rabbit =

Fuji S-1
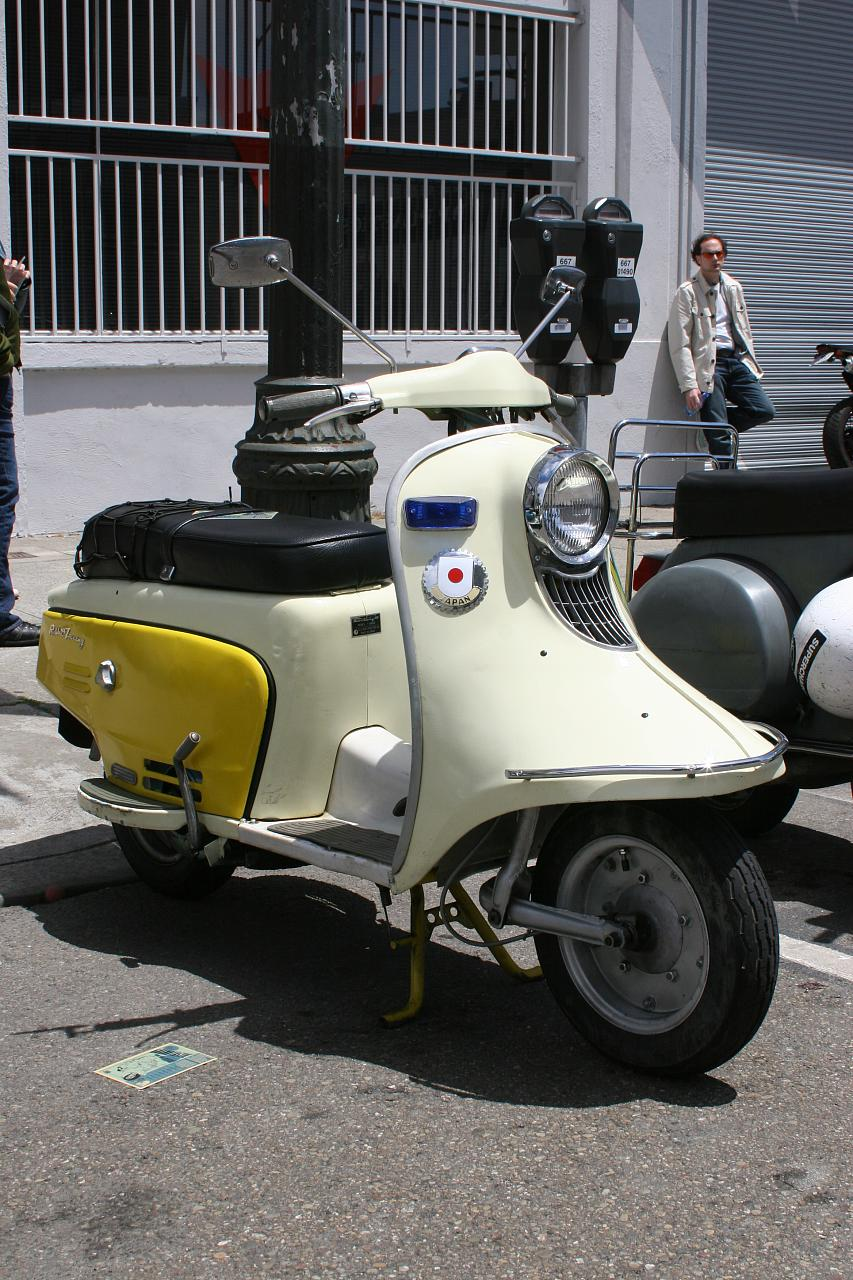
- Fuji Touring 150
- Manufacturer: Fuji-Sangyo now Subaru Corporation
- Also called: Fuji Rabbit scooter
- Production: 1946—1968
- Assembly: Otakita Plant, Ōta, Gunma, Japan
- Predecessor: Powell Streamliner
- Class: Scooter
- Engine: 135 cm^{3} (8.2 cu in) 4-stroke, SV air-cooled, vertical single-cylinder
- Bore / stroke: 55 mm × 57 mm (2.2 in × 2.2 in)
- Power: 2 PS (1.5 kW; 2.0 hp) at 3000 rpm
- Frame type: Ladder tube
- Wheelbase: 1,115 mm (43.9 in)
- Dimensions: L: 1,547 mm (60.9 in); W: 545 mm (21.5 in); H: 940 mm (37 in)
- Weight: 75 kg (165 lb) (dry)
- Fuel capacity: 5.6 L (1.2 imp gal; 1.5 US gal)
- Fuel consumption: 35 km/L (99 mpg_{‑imp}; 82 mpg_{‑US})

The Fuji Rabbit is a motor scooter produced in Japan by Fuji Heavy Industries (now Subaru Corporation) from 1946 through 1968. The Society of Automotive Engineers of Japan (in Japanese) rates the Fuji Rabbit S-1 model introduced in 1946 as one of their 240 Landmarks of Japanese Automotive Technology.

== Production ==
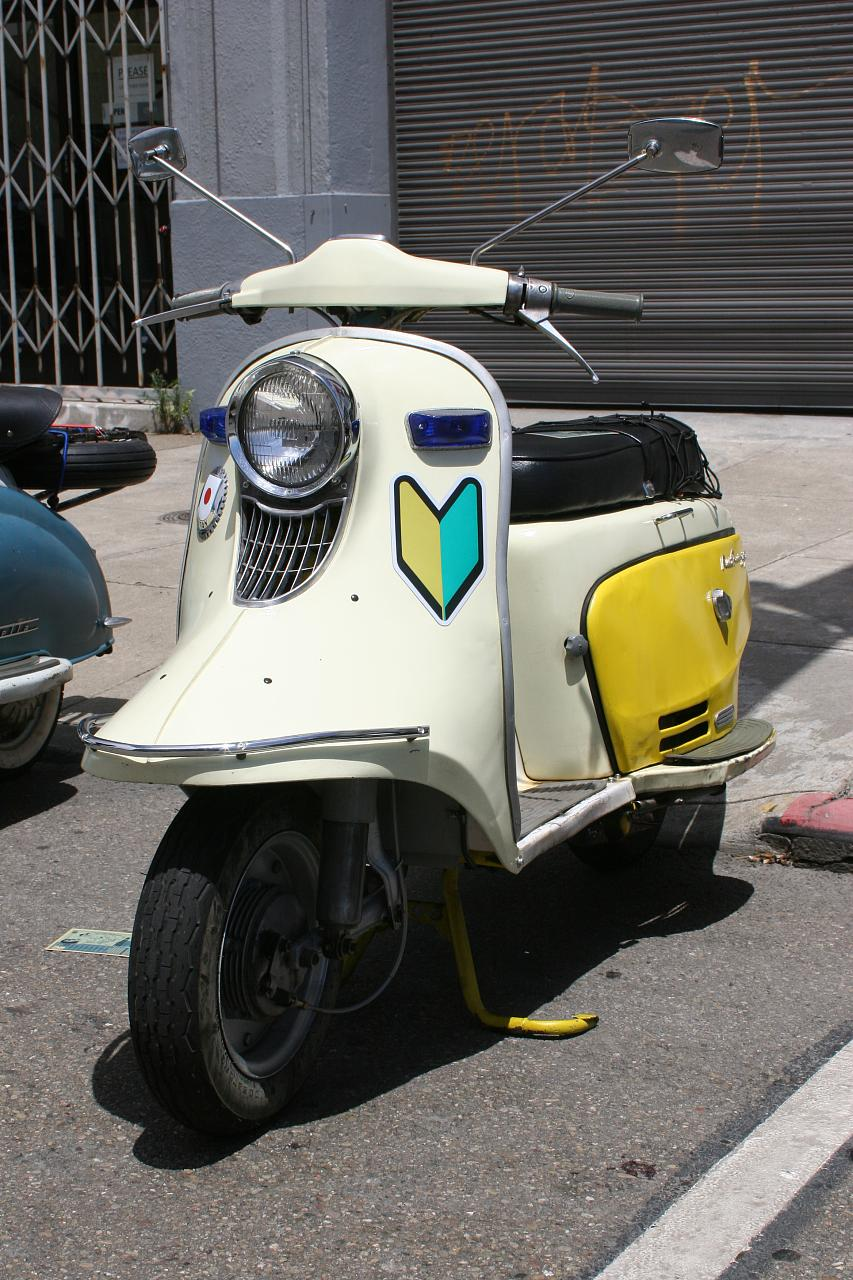
Fuji Rabbit 150, showing a Shoshinsha beginner's mark

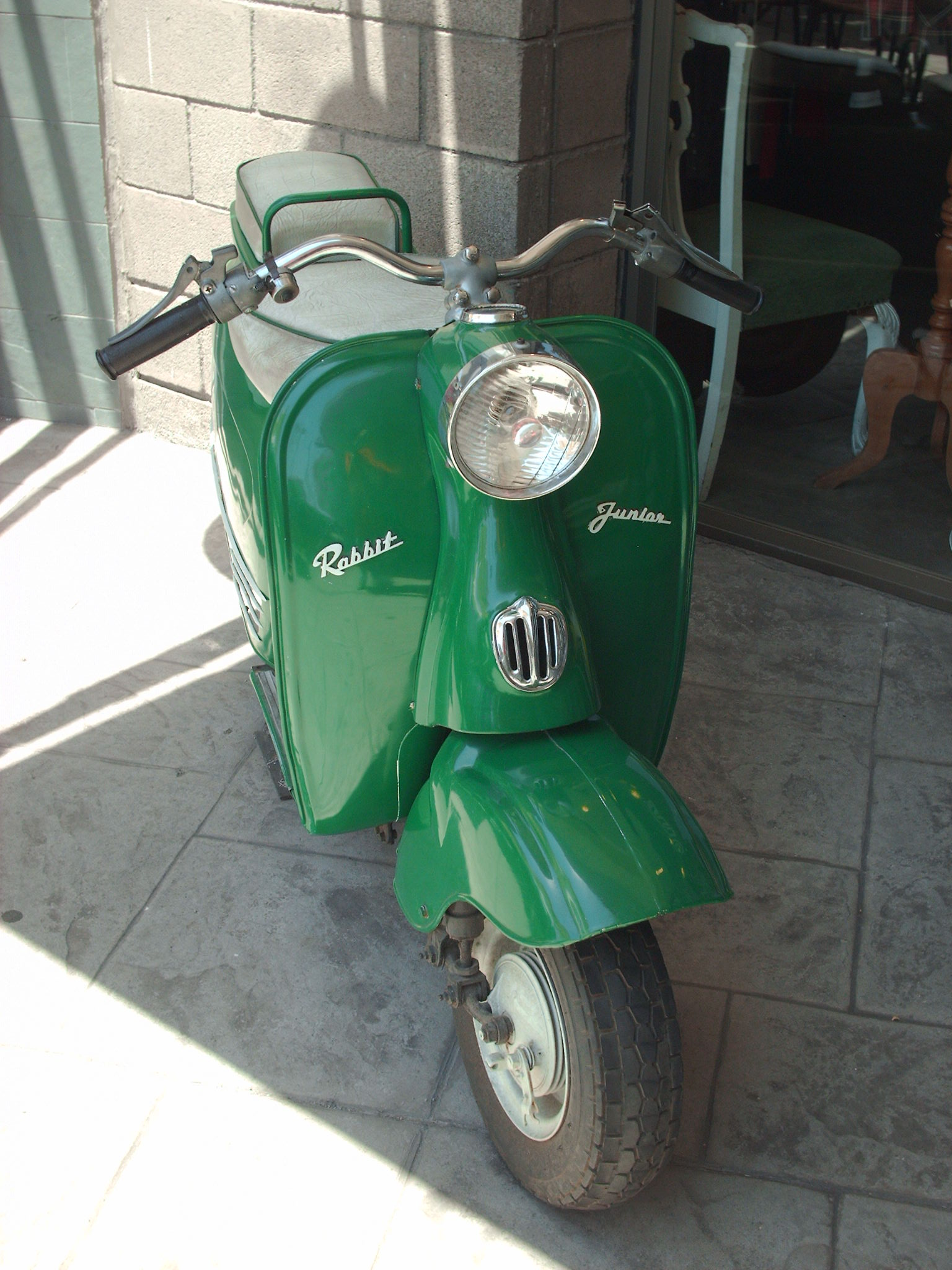
Fuji Rabbit Junior in Chile

Production of the initial model, the S-1, began in 1946, some six months before the Vespa went into production. It was largely inspired by scooters used by American servicemen during and after World War II, benefiting from engineering efforts from the scooter built by the Powell Manufacturing Company. As the first motor scooter manufactured in Japan, it was enormously successful and revolutionized the postwar vehicle industry. Eventually, the Fuji Rabbit scooters evolved into some of the most technologically sophisticated scooters of their era, featuring electric starters, automatic transmissions, and pneumatic suspension systems. The Fuji Rabbit scooters were the first Japanese-made scooters capable of reaching speeds in excess of 60 miles per hour (97 km/h). The Rabbit's primary competitor was the Mitsubishi Silver Pigeon, which started production around the same time. Motor scooters were so important to the postwar vehicle industry that in May 1948, both a Silver Pigeon and a Rabbit were presented to the Emperor of Japan. Starting in 1954, the Rabbit also faced competition from the Honda Juno.

As the Japanese economy expanded, the demand for scooters decreased in favor of more comfortable four-wheel transport, called kei carss, and Fuji followed suit and diversified into automobiles in 1958 with the introduction of the Subaru 360. The last Fuji scooter rolled off the production line in June 1968.

== In popular culture ==
Although not very well known outside Japan, the Fuji Rabbit has earned itself a place in Japanese pop culture as a symbol of nostalgia. Fuji Rabbits have been featured in Japanese animated series, such as Paranoia Agent, and are a favourite amongst collectors of scooters and motorcycles in Japan.

== North America ==
In North America, the Fuji Rabbit is best known for starting Malcolm Bricklin's motor vehicle career. (Bricklin was later responsible for importing the Subaru 360 and the Yugo hatchback, as well as producing his own car, among other things.)

The main importer for North America was the American Rabbit Corporation.
