= Mitsubishi Mizushima =

Truck

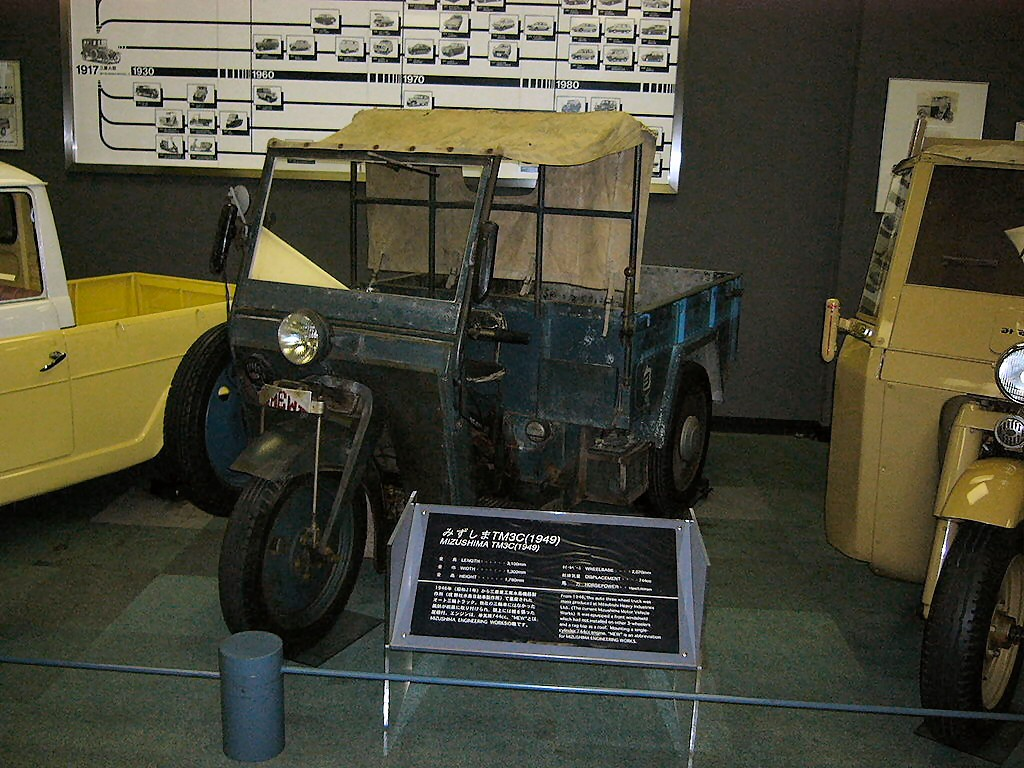
- Mitsubishi Mizushima TM3C

Overview
- Manufacturer: Mitsubishi
- Production: 1947–1962

The Mitsubishi Mizushima (Japanese: 三菱・みずしま) is the first of a series of three-wheeled cargo carriers made in Japan by Mitsubishi between 1947 and 1962. A number of prototypes were built in 1946, leading to series production beginning in May 1947. Along with the Silver Pigeon scooter it represented the company's first contributions to the Japanese post-war personal transport boom.

== Mizushima Works ==
The Mizushima Aircraft works was originally established in September 1943 to build the Mitsubishi G4M2 (504 examples) and later the N1K2-J Shiden-Kai (7 planes completed). The factory was built on mostly virgin land, and the township of Mizushima, Kurashiki was established around the plant. The factory was heavily damaged in a 22 June 1945 B-29 bombing raid and no more planes were produced. In November 1945, the Occupying Forces were petitioned to allow the company to be reorganized for peacetime activities, and Mizushima Engineering Works was born. Originally part of Mitsubishi Heavy Industries, the zaibatsu was broken up into three separate companies in January 1950, with Mizushima becoming part of Central Japan Heavy-Industries, Ltd. This company was renamed Shin-Mitsubishi Heavy Industries in May 1952, as the occupation ended and the Mitsubishi name was once again allowed to be used. The Mizushima factory changed name again in October 1960, becoming the "Mizushima Motor Works."

== TM3 ==
The Mizushima XTM-1 prototype was completed in 1946. The original production version (TM3A) appeared the following year and was a mechanically simple and rugged vehicle, with a 400 kg carrying capacity. Unlike most three-wheeled trucks in the market, however, the TM3A was equipped with a folding canvas covering and a windshield to protect the occupants.

== Evolutions ==
Later models would be introduced offering greater load-bearing abilities and a wider variety of bodystyles. The 1948–50 TM3D model was built with a hardtop passenger cabin in response to customer demands, while the final development of the Mizushima line, the TM18 Mitsubishi 1500 pickup introduced in 1955, could carry up to two tons in its cargo bed. The first models had air-cooled single-cylinder engines, but with the 1955 TM7 a 1.3-liter OHV twin-cylinder engine with 36 PS (26 kW) appeared. This engine type diverged into a 1145 and a 1489 cc version in 1958, to help cover weight classes ranging from one to two tonnes (2,200 to 4,400 lb).

During the Mizushima's life approximately 91,000 were produced, before it was replaced by the Mitsubishi Minicab and various other four-wheeled light- and medium-duty trucks in 1962.

=== Mizushima models ===
Model	Engine		Power			Trans- mission	Top Speed		Payload		Weight		Length		Width		Wheelbase		Cargo bed length			Years produced	Notes
Model	Layout	Type	PS	kW	at (rpm)	Trans- mission	km/h	mph	kg	lb	kg	lb	mm	in	mm	in	mm	in	mm	尺	in	Years produced	Notes
TM3A	744 cc air-cooled SV single	3A	13.5	10	3000	3MT	50	31	400	882	585	1,290	2,797	110	1,750	69	1,880	74				1947-1954	TM3C/F capacity 500kg
TM4E	886 cc air-cooled SV single	ME10	20.5	15	3400	3MT	55	34	1,000	2,205	780	1,720	3,610	142	1,452	57	2,360	93	1,950	6.43	76.8	1952-1956?	width later 1550mm
TM4F	886 cc air-cooled SV single	ME10	20.5	15	3400	3MT	55	34	1,000	2,205			3,810	150	1,452	57	2,460	97	2,150	7.10	84.6	1954-1956?	width later 1550mm
TM5F	886 cc air-cooled SV single	ME10	20.5	15	3400	3MT	55	34	1,000	2,205	875	1,929	3,810	150	1,550	61	2,460	97	2,150	7.10	84.6	1955-195?	
TM5G	886 cc air-cooled SV single	ME10	20.5	15	3400	3MT	55	34	1,000	2,205	920	2,028	4,210	166	1,550	61	2,575	101	2,550	8.41	100	1955-195?	
TM6	744 cc air-cooled SV single	6A	15	11	3400	3MT			750	1,653			3,360	132	1,452	57	2,120	83				1955-195?	
TM7A	1276 cc air-cooled OHV twin	ME7	36	26.5	3600	4MT	74/78	46/48.5	1,500	3,307	1,235	2,723	4,500	177	1,680	66	3,000	118	2,500	8.25	98.4	1955-195?	steering wheel
TM8B	1276 cc air-cooled OHV twin	ME7	36	26.5	3600	4MT	72/76	45/47	2,000	4,409	1,310	2,888	5,100	201	1,680	66	3,300	130	3,100	10.2	122	1955-195?	TM8A is shorter; dimensions as per TM7A
TM11F	886 cc air-cooled SV single	ME10	20.5	15	3400	3MT	55	34	1,000	2,205	867	1,911	3,790	149	1,550	61	2,465	97	2,150	7.10	84.6	1956-195?	
TM11G	886 cc air-cooled SV single	ME10	20.5	15	3400	3MT	55	34	1,000	2,205	891	1,964	4,180	165	1,550	61	2,535	100	2,550	8.41	100	1956-195?	
TM12F	851 cc air-cooled OHV single	ME12	27	20	3600	4MT	74	46	1,000	2,205	900	1,984	3,940	155	1,550	61	2,575	101	2,150	7.10	84.6	1957-195?	
TM14G	851 cc air-cooled OHV single	ME12	27	20	3600	4MT	72	45	1,250	2,756	925	2,039	4,290	169	1,550	61	2,700	106	2,550	8.41	100	1957-195?	Also shorter TM14F; dimensions as per TM12F
TM15	1145 cc air-cooled OHV twin	ME15	36	26.5		4MT	78	48.5	1,000	2,205	980	2,161	4,130	163	1,640	65	2,765	109	2,150	7.10	84.6	1958-1962	
TM16	1145 cc air-cooled OHV twin	ME15	36	26.5		4MT	78	48.5	1,250	2,756	1,010	2,227	4,480	176	1,640	65	2,890	114	2,500	8.25	98.4	1958-1962	
TM17	1489 cc air-cooled OHV twin	ME18	47	34.5		4MT	80	50	1,500	3,307	1,160	2,557	4,510	178	1,690	67	3,050	120	2,500	8.25	98.4	1958-1962	
TM18	1489 cc air-cooled OHV twin	ME18	47	34.5		4MT	80	50	2,000	4,409	1,230	2,712	5,110	201	1,690	67	3,350	132	3,100	10.2	122	1958-1962	

=== Leo ===
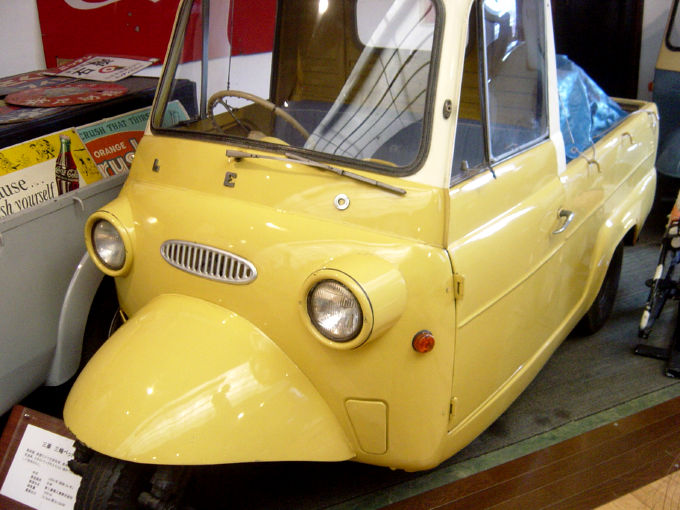
A Mitsubishi Leo, photographed at Fukuyama Motor and Clock Museum.

The 1959 Mitsubishi Leo, heavily influenced by the Mizushima, was a transition between the company's first post-war vehicles and the Mitsubishi Minica, which represented the company's future in the 1960s. The Leo used a 309 cc air-cooled single-cylinder engine, the ME20, producing 12.5 hp at 4,500 rpm. Payload was 300 kg (660 lb), top speed 65 km/h (40 mph).

Almost four decades later, Olivier Boulay would borrow heavily from the Leo for styling cues for his first prototypes when he became Mitsubishi Motors' design chief in 2001.
