= Riverside (brand) =

- Company type: brand
- Industry: motorcycles
- Area served: North America
- Parent: Montgomery Ward

Riverside was a store brand used by North American retailer Montgomery Ward to market a range of captive import motorcycles, mopeds and scooters. The vehicles were typically manufactured by Motobecane, Benelli, Bianchi, Lambretta, or Mitsubishi. Benelli models included 250cc, 125cc, and 49cc models, Motobecanes with 49cc motors were also offered.

== Benelli models ==
- 150-D (2-cycle 49cc)
- FFA-14002 (2-cycle 49cc)
- FFA-14003 (2-cycle 49cc)
- FFA-14017, 14017C, 14017D, 14023 (4-cycle 247cc)
- FFA-14020 (4-cycle 326.8cc)
- FFA-14040, 14041 (4-cycle 356.3cc)
- FFA-14043, 14047 (4-cycle 269.2cc)
- FFA-61-14016, 14016B, 14019 (2-cycle 125cc)
- FFA-61-14021A (2-cycle 175cc)

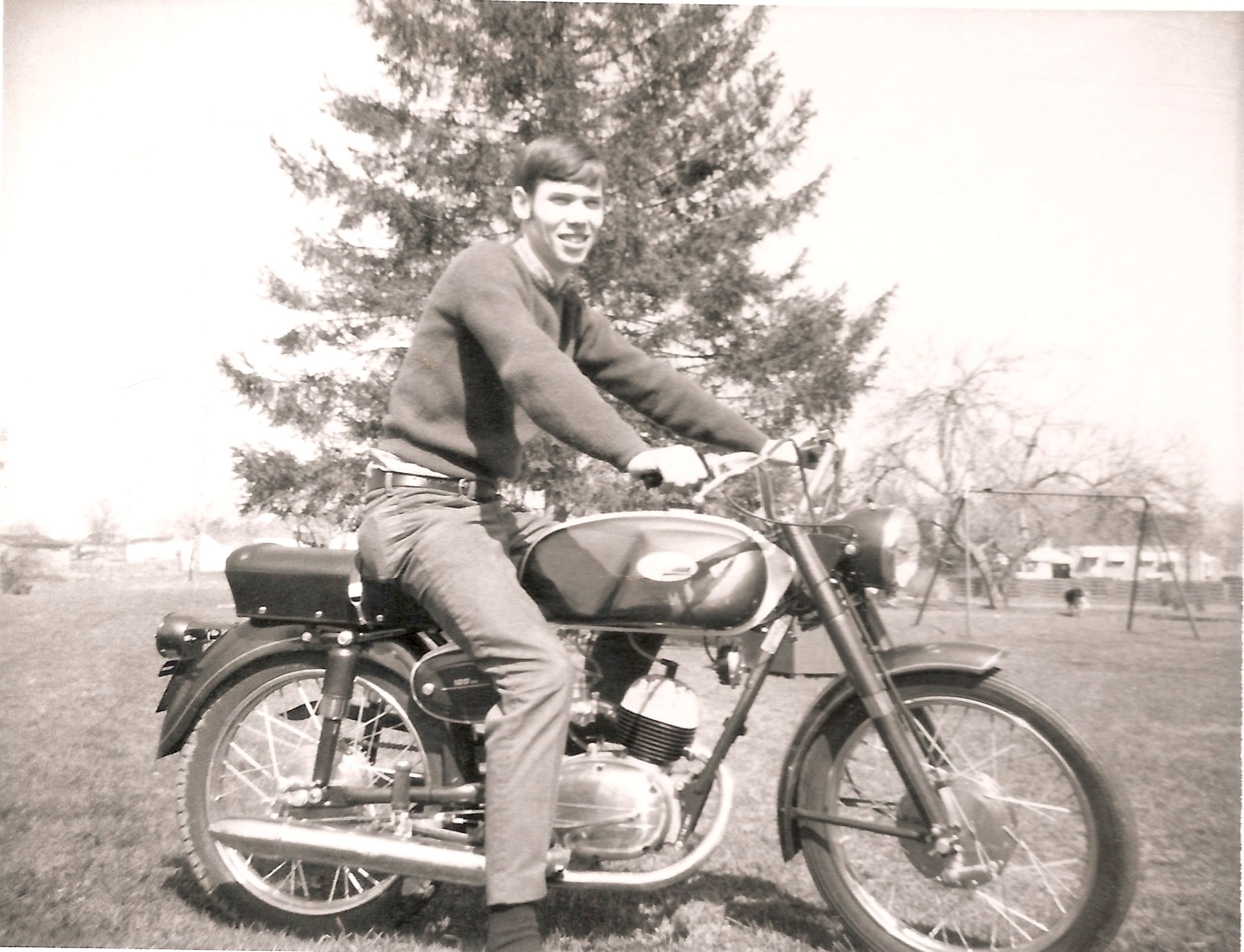
1968 Riverside 125cc

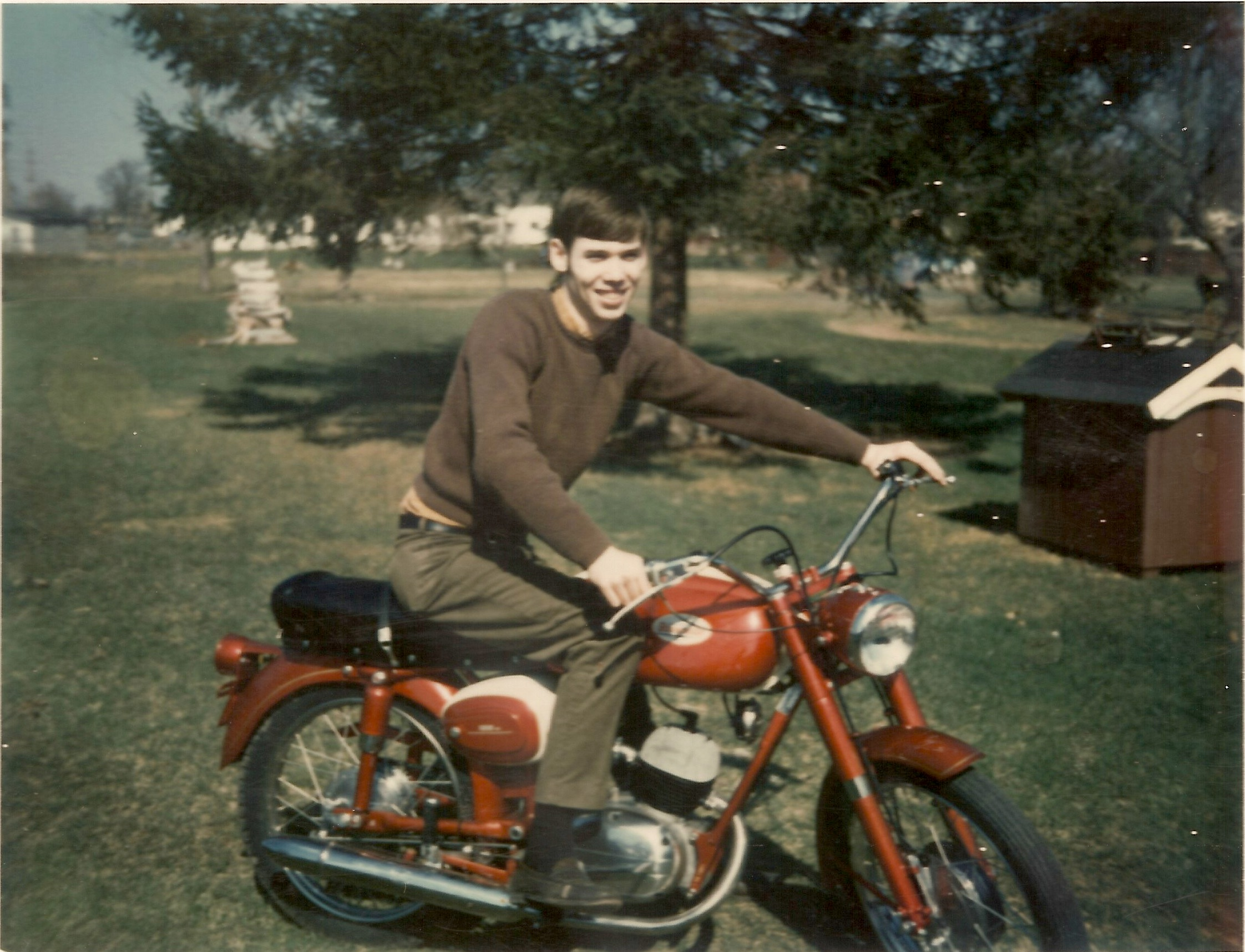

== Lambretta models ==
- 125Li (2-cycle 125cc)

== Mitsubishi models ==
- Miami (2-cycle 200cc)

== Motobecane models ==
- Mo-Ped (2-cycle 49cc)

== Bianchi models ==
- Orsetto (2-cycle 80cc)
