= Juno =

Juno commonly refers to:

- Juno (mythology), the Roman goddess of marriage and queen of the gods
- Juno (film), the 2007 film

Juno may also refer to:

== Arts, entertainment and media ==
=== Fictional characters ===
- Juno, a character in the book Juno of Taris by Fleur Beale
- Juno, a character in the film Jenny, Juno
- Juno, a character in the film Beetlejuice
- Juno, a character in the manga series Beastars
- Juno, a character in the video game Assassin's Creed
- Juno, a character in the video game The Banner Saga
- Juno, a character in the video game Jet Force Gemini
- Juno, a character in the video game Omega Strikers game
- Juno (Dune), a character in the Dune universe
- Juno (Overwatch), a character in the video game Overwatch 2 and related franchise media
- Juno Boyle, in the play Juno and the Paycock
- Juno Eclipse, a character in the Star Wars Legends universe
- Juno MacGuff, a character from Juno (film)
- Juno Steel, a character in The Penumbra Podcast
- Mega Man Juno, in Mega Man Legends game
- Sailor Juno, a character in the manga series Sailor Moon

=== Music ===
==== Musicians and groups ====
- Juno (band), a 1995–2003 American rock band
- Juno (rapper) (born 1987), Finnish hip hop artist
- Juno (singer) (born 1986), South Korean singer

==== Albums ====
- Juno (album), by Remi Wolf, 2021
- Juno (soundtrack), from the 2007 film

==== Songs ====
- "Juno" (song), by Sabrina Carpenter, 2024
- "Juno" (Funeral for a Friend song), or "Juneau", 2002/2003
- "JUNO", by Blank Banshee from Mega, 2016
- "Juno", by Life Without Buildings from Any Other City, 2001
- "Juno", by Running Touch, 2021
- "Juno", by Tesseract from Sonder, 2018
- "Juno", by Throwing Muses from House Tornado, 1988
- "Juno", by Tokyo Police Club from Elephant Shell, 2008
- "Juno", by Cavetown from Worm Food, 2022

==== Other uses in music ====
- Juno (musical), 1959
- Juno Awards, a Canadian music award
- Juno Records, an online music store
- Juno, synthesizers by the Roland Corporation

== Business ==
- Juno (cigarette), a German brand
- Juno (company), a transportation network company formed in 2016
- Juno Online Services, an internet service provider
- Juno Therapeutics, a biopharmaceutical company
- Juno, a German home appliance manufacturer, now part of Electrolux

== People ==
=== Given name ===
- Juno Birch, English drag queen and sculptor
- Juno Calypso (born 1989), English photographer
- Juno Dawson, English author
- Juno Mak, Hong Kong Chinese pop singer
- Juno Frankie Pierce (1864–1954), African-American suffragist
- Juno Roxas (born 1967), Australian musician
- Juno Sauler (born 1973), Filipino basketball coach
- Juno Temple (born 1989), English actress
- Juno Callender, multi-instrumentalist member of Femtanyl

=== Surname ===
- Madeline Juno (born 1995), German singer-songwriter

== Places ==
=== United States ===
- Juno, Georgia
- Juno, Tennessee
- Juno, Texas

=== Elsewhere ===
- Juno, Limpopo, South Africa
- Juno Beach (disambiguation)

== Science and technology ==
=== Space ===
- Juno (spacecraft), a NASA mission to Jupiter
- 3 Juno, an asteroid
  - Juno clump, a probable asteroid family in the vicinity of 3 Juno
- Juno I, a satellite launch vehicle
- Juno II, a rocket
- Project Juno, a private British space programme

=== Other uses in science and technology ===
- Juno (plant), common name of Iris subg. Scorpiris
- Juno (protein), on the surface of the mammalian egg cell that facilitates fertilisation
- Jiangmen Underground Neutrino Observatory (JUNO), a neutrino experiment in Jiangmen, China
- Eclipse Juno, an Eclipse software development environment
- OpenStack Juno, an OpenStack open-source software platform

== Transportation ==
- HMS Juno, a list of ships
- MV Juno, a list of ships
- Juno (1793 ship), an English whaler and naval transport
- Juno (1797 ship), an English merchantman
- Honda Juno, a scooter
- Juno Racing Cars
- Juno, a locomotive in the South Devon Railway Dido class
- Juno, a locomotive in the GWR Banking Class

== Other uses ==
- January 2015 North American blizzard, informally called Juno
- Juno (bear), a polar bear and official mascot of the Canadian Army
- Juno (whale), a captive beluga whale who has been in several viral videos

== See also ==
- Juneau (disambiguation)
- Junos OS, Juniper Networks Operating System
- JUNOS – Young liberal NEOS
