= Mitsubishi 2G1 engine =

Overview
- Manufacturer: Mitsubishi Motors
- Also called: Red, Gold engine
- Production: 1968–1976

Layout
- Configuration: two-stroke I2

Chronology
- Predecessor: ME21/24
- Successor: Vulcan 2G2

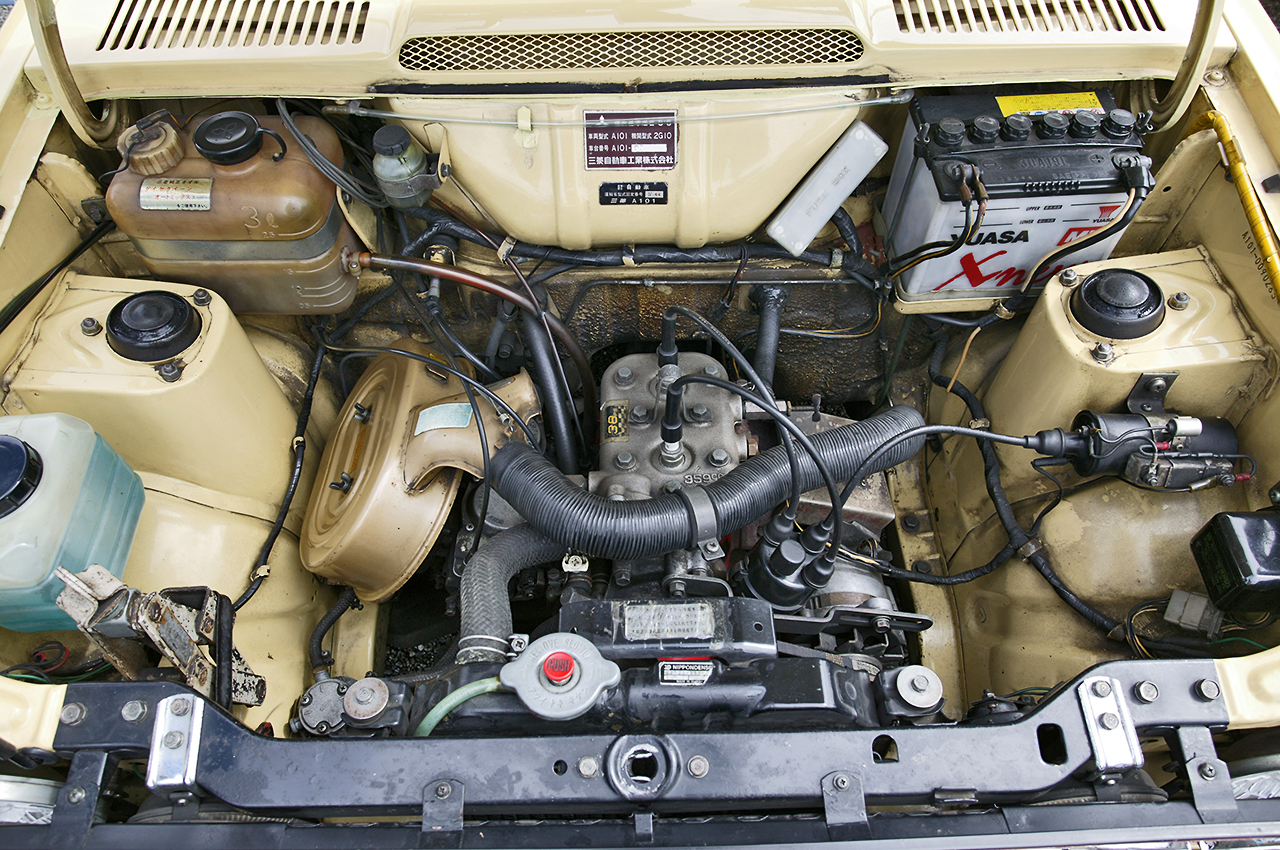

The Mitsubishi 2G1 engine is a water-cooled iron-block two-stroke twin-cylinder engine built by Mitsubishi Motors for the kei car class from 1968. They were first introduced in the first generation Minica to replace (and to complement) the otherwise similar but air-cooled ME24 powerplant. The difference of nomenclature compared to the ME24 is due to Mitsubishi's 1967 change of engine naming practice, 2G1 meaning it was in the first family of two-cylinder gasoline-powered engines. The "0" in "2G10" means that it was the first displacement version produced, with numbers after a dash (e.g. 2G10-5) then denoting the various subiterations.

The 2G10 engine was replaced by the 2G21 "Vulcan" engine, a four-stroke unit of identical displacement which first appeared in September 1972. The two-stroke 2G10 did continue to be produced as a low-cost alternative until new Kei car regulations took effect in January 1976, mainly for commercial vehicles.

== 2G10 ==
=== Specifications ===
Engine type	Twin-cylinder two-stroke
Displacement	359 cc
Bore × stroke	62.0 mm × 59.6 mm (2.44 in × 2.35 in)
Fuel type	Self mix oil and gasoline
Peak power	23 PS (16.9 kW) at 5500 rpm 2G10, Minica LA23 SDX
Peak power	28 PS (20.6 kW) at 6000 rpm 2G10-1, first "Red"
Peak power	38 PS (27.9 kW) at 7000 rpm 2G10-2, "Gold"
Peak power	34 PS (25.0 kW) at ? rpm 2G10-4, second "Red"
Peak power	31 PS (22.8 kW) at 6500 rpm 2G10-5, third "Red" (Minica 73, Minica Van); 28 PS (21 kW) at 6000 rpm (Minicab W, 1972-197?)
Peak torque	3.4 kg⋅m (33 N⋅m; 25 lb⋅ft) at 5000 rpm 2G10, Minica LA23 SDX
Peak torque	3.6 kg⋅m (35 N⋅m; 26 lb⋅ft) at 5000 rpm 2G10-1 first "Red"
Peak torque	3.9 kg⋅m (38 N⋅m; 28 lb⋅ft) at 6500 rpm 2G10-2 "Gold"
Peak torque	3.8 kg⋅m (37 N⋅m; 27 lb⋅ft) at 5500 rpm 2G10-5 third "Red" (Minica 73, Minica Van); 3.7 kg⋅m (36 N⋅m; 27 lb⋅ft) at 4000 rpm (Minicab W, 1972-197?)

=== Applications ===
- 1968-69 Mitsubishi Minica LA23
- 1969-76 Mitsubishi Minica A101/101V
- 1972-76 Mitsubishi Minicab W

== See also ==
- List of Mitsubishi engines
