= Mitsubishi Motors engines =

Motors made by Mitsubishi

This is a list of engines produced by Mitsubishi Motors since 1964, and its predecessors prior to this.

== Explanation of codes ==
The Mitsubishi zaibatsu had been broken up into three companies by the US occupying forces. Automobile and truck engines were mainly built by three branches of one of these companies, Central Heavy Industries (Shin-Mitsubishi Heavy Industries from 1952). These three branches (Mizushima, Nagoya, and Kyoto Engineering Works) were established as clusters of the many small aircraft factories built during the war. Thus, Mizushima developments gained the ME code, followed by a numerical, while engines developed in Nagoya became the NE-series and Kyoto-developments were named KE. The numbers do not in any way relate to each other or across letter codes and were purely issued in order of development. In 1964 the three companies were merged into Mitsubishi Heavy Industries and eventually a new naming system emerged.

Since the introduction of the 2G10 engine in October 1968, Mitsubishi engines use a four-digit naming convention:

- The first (digit) signifies the number of cylinders; "2" = straight-2, "3" = straight-3, "4" = straight-4, "6" = V6, "8" = V8.
- The second (letter) formerly referred to the fuel type; "D" = diesel, "G" = gasoline. However, since the 1980s, this has changed. Two engine families were introduced using the letter "A" to denote that all the engines in the family had an alloy cylinder head. Their latest engines, however, do not follow any previous conventions (e.g. 4M4, 3B2, etc.).
- The third (digit) previously denoted the engine family. Five of the "4G" straight-four engine families had distinct names; "4G1" = Orion, "4G3" = Saturn, "4G4" = Neptune, "4G5" = Astron, and "4G6" = Sirius.
- The fourth (digit) is the specific engine model within the family, issued in order of development. It is not a guide to its place within that family, nor is it a guide to the capacity of the engine.

There may also be supplementary letters after the initial four characters. "T" can indicate that the engine is turbocharged (e.g. 4G63T), "B" that this is the second version of the engine (e.g. 4G63B). Where engine codes are used which include the supplemental letters, the first digit denoting the number of cylinders may be omitted, so 4G63T may be seen as G63T.

== Configurations ==
=== Single-cylinder ===
These were used in Mitsubishi's very first vehicles, motor scooters and three-wheelers.

- A-series — A 744 cc air-cooled OHV engine installed as the 3A in the 1947 Mitsubishi TM3A three-wheeled truck. The TM6 three-wheeler of 1955 was equipped with an improved 6A engine.
- 1952-196? — ME10/12 — A development of the A family engine ("Mizushima Engine"). The sidevalve ME10 displaces 886 cc (TM4 and TM5 three-wheeled trucks), while the later, OHV ME12 is of 851 cc.

As fitted to the 1.25-tonne (2,760 lb) Mitsubishi "Mizushima" TM14G three-wheeled truck, the ME12 developed 27 PS (20 kW) at 3600 rpm.

- NE/NE1 — "Nagoya Engine," First introduced as the 112 cc side-valve, air-cooled 1.5 hp NE10 for the famous Silver Pigeon scooter. Later iterations included the NE7, the enlarged 192 cc NE9, and the OHV 125 cc NE8 and 175 cc NE13.
- ME20 — This 309 air-cooled OHV engine served in the three-wheeled Leo.

=== Two-cylinder/inline 2 ===
Mitsubishi's smallest powerplants, most commonly found in their earliest models in the 1960s:

- 1955-1962 — ME7/15/18 — This was Mitsubishi's first air-cooled OHV engine over one liter's displacement. In 1955, the 1276 cc ME7 was developed for the 1.5-tonne (3,310 lb) Mitsubishi TM7. The 1145 cc ME15 and the 1489 cc ME18 were premiered in 1958 for the TM15/16 and TM17/18 trucks; production of this engine series ended when Mitsubishi discontinued heavier three-wheeled trucks.
- 1960-1962 — NE19A — 0.5 L — The air-cooled 493 cc OHV twin-cylinder engine in the Mitsubishi 500, the first passenger car built by the company after the Second World War. Bore and stroke were 70.0 x 64.0 mm
- 1961-1965 — NE35A — 0.6 L — a 594 cc iteration of the NE series, 72.0 x 73.0 mm. This engine was used in the Mitsubishi 500 Super DeLuxe and Mitsubishi Colt 600.
- 1961-1976 — ME21/24 — 0.36 L — This air-cooled two-stroke first served in the Mitsubishi 360 but was used in various Minicas until 1972 and in Minicabs until 1976.
- 1968-1976 — 2G1 — 0.36 L — First introduced in late first generation Minicas in October 1968 to gradually replace the air-cooled ME24 powerplant. The water-cooled 2G10 was a two-stroke engine like its predecessor.
- 1972-1988 — 2G2 "Vulcan" — 0.36-0.8 L — a new four-stroke OHC design introduced in 1972 to succeed the 2G1, fitted to Minicas and Minicabs. 359 cc, 471 cc, 546 cc, 644 cc and 783 cc versions were produced. It also equipped the Mazda Porter Cab.

=== Three cylinder/inline-3 ===
- 1987–present — 3G8 — 0.55-0.8 L
- 2005-? — 3B2 — 0.66-1.0 L
- 2003–present — 3A9 — 1.0-1.2 L

=== Four-cylinder/inline-4 ===
Gasoline:

- 1963-1975 — KE4 — 1.0-2.0 L

- KE42, 1962 (Canter 1st generation 66kW, 2nd gen 66kW @ 4800 rpm, 3rd gen 1995cc, 70kW) or earlier til ???, on Canter replaced in January 1975
- KE47, 1968 (Canter 2nd gen 70kW @ 4500 rpm, 172Nm @ 2800 rpm, 3rd gen 2315cc, 74kW) or later til January 1975 (Canter) or later

- 1969-1999 — 4G3 — 1.2-1.8 L — nick name "Saturn"
- 1971-1979 — 4G4 — 1.2-1.4 L — nick name "Neptune"
- 1972-? — 4G5 — 1.8-2.6 L — nick name "Astron"
- 1978-present — 4G1 — 1.2-1.6 L — nick name "Orion"
- 1980-present — 4G6 — 1.6-2.4 L — nick name "Sirius"
- late 1980s — 4G8 — 1.1 L
- 1991-2007 — 4G9 — 1.5-2.0 L
- 1993-? — 4A3 — 0.66-1.1 L
- 2003–present — 4A9 — 1.3-1.6 L (2010–present)
- 2007–present — 4B1 — 1.8-2.4 L — nick name "GEMA engine"
- 2013–present — 4J1 — 1.8-2.4 L
- 2017–present — 4B4 — 1.5 L
- 2014–present — 4K1 — 1.8-2.4 L - Based on 4G6 block
- 2017–present — 4K2 — 1.8-2.4 L - Based on 4G6 block
- 2022–present — 4K3 — 2.0 L - Based on 4G6 block

Diesels:

- 1963-? — KE4 — 2.0 L
- 1970-? — 4DR — 2.7 L

Two 2659 cc straight-4 normally aspirated and turbodiesels, 4DR5 and 4DR6, fitted to some Canter light trucks, and also fitted to the company's Jeep which it built under licence from Willys between 1953 and 1998. Also used in some larger forklift trucks.

- 4DR5: Bore x stroke 92.0mm x 100.0mm. Capacity 2659cc. Compression ratio 20.0:1. Naturally aspirated power output 80PS @ 3,800rpm. Torque output 18.0 kg/m @ 2,200rpm. The indirect injected 4DR5 produced from naturally aspirated 75 to 80 PS (55 to 59 kW), while the turbocharged and intercooled versions produced a torque of 22.5 kg/m (220.65 Nm) at 2000 RPM and had a compression ratio of 21.5:1, with a maximum power of 100 PS (74 kW) at 3,300 rpm.
- 4DR6 with direct injection has a lower compression ratio of 17.5 producing a torque of 21.0 kgm (205.94 Nm) at 2000 rpm with a maximum power of 94 PS (69 kW) at 3,500 rpm

- 1980–present — 4D5 — 2.3-2.5 L — diesel versions of the "Astron" engine
- 1983-2008 — 4D6 — 1.8-2.0 L — diesel versions of the "Sirius" engine
- 1991-2019 — 4M4 — 2.8-3.2 L
- 2010–present — 4N1 — 1.8-2.4 L

=== Six-cylinder/inline-6/V6 ===
Mitsubishi has three families of V6 engines, which have seen use in its midsize lines, coupés and compacts.

- 1963-1970 — KE6 — 2.0-3.5 L — A straight-6 as gasoline or diesel engines.
- 1970-1976 — 6G3 — 2.0 L — "Saturn 6" straight-6
- 1986-2021 — 6G7 — 2.0-3.8 L — "Cyclone V6"
- 1992-2009 — 6A1 — 1.6-2.5 L
- 2005–2021 — 6B3 — 3.0 L

=== Eight-cylinder/V8 ===
- 1999-2008 — 8A8 — 4.5 L — For its Japan-only Proudia and Dignity models, Mitsubishi built an alloy-headed 4.5 L V8 with GDI. The vehicles proved unsuccessful, and were quickly discontinued. However, the range had been developed in conjunction with the Hyundai Motor Company, whose Hyundai Equus fared much better.

== See also ==
- List of Mitsubishi Fuso engines
