= Juneau (disambiguation) =

Juneau is the capital city of Alaska, United States.

Juneau may also refer to:

== Places in the United States ==
- Juneau, Pennsylvania, a populated place
- Juneau, Wisconsin, a city
- Juneau County, Wisconsin
- Juneau Icefield or Juneau Icecap, Alaska
- Mount Juneau, Alaska
- Juneau mining district, a gold mining area in Alaska
- Roman Catholic Diocese of Juneau

== Ships ==
- Juneau-class cruiser, a class of United States Navy light cruisers
- USS Juneau (CL-52), a World War II US Navy cruiser
- USS Juneau (CL-119), a US Navy ship
- USS Juneau (LPD-10), Austin-class amphibious transport
- SS Solomon Juneau, Liberty ship

== Other uses ==
- Juneau (surname)
- Juneau (band), a pop-punk band from Houston, Texas
- "Juneau" (song), a song by Funeral for a Friend

== See also ==
- Juno (disambiguation)
