= Junot =

Junot (English: /ʒuːˈnoʊ/, French: [ʒyno]) is a French name that may refer to the following notable people:

Given name

- Junot Díaz (born 1968), Dominican American writer and academic

Surname

- Jean-Andoche Junot, 1st Duke of Abrantès (1771–1813), French general during the Revolutionary and Napoleonic Wars
- Laure Junot, Duchess of Abrantes (1784–1838), French writer
- Mara Junot, American voiceover actress
- Philippe Junot (1940–2026), French venture capitalist and property developer

== See also ==
- Juno (disambiguation)
