= Juno (cigarette) =

Former German cigarette brand

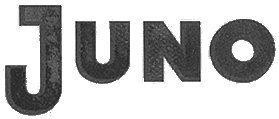
- Product type: Cigarette
- Produced by: Reemtsma
- Country: German Empire
- Introduced: 1896
- Discontinued: 2016; 10 years ago
- Markets: Germany
- Previous owners: Cigarettenfabrik "JOSETTI" GmbH
- Tagline: "Thick and round", "For a good reason is Juno round"

Juno was a German brand of cigarettes, owned and manufactured by Reemtsma, a subsidiary of Imperial Tobacco. The brand was discontinued in 2016.

== History ==
Juno was launched in 1896 with new Virginia tobaccos from the Berliner Cigarettenfabrik "JOSETTI". To distinguish between flat oriental cigarettes with an oval cigarette cross section, a thick and round shape was chosen. The slogan of the launch phase was "Thick and round", also to be found on the cigarette packs of the Gründerzeit. The name "Josetti Juno" was registered on February 9, 1898 at the DPMA under no. 34169. and is still maintained by the Hamburg Reemtsma Cigarettenfabriken GmbH.

=== The Cigarettenfabrik Josetti ===
An old German pack of Juno cigarettes, with a German text warning at the bottom of the pack

The Berlin company was founded in 1888 by Oskar Josetti at the Hamburger Straße 8. In 1892 the founder emigrated to the United States and sold the company for 500 Deutsche Mark, who, together with his partner Leopold Peters, continued the company in 1895 as "Cigarettenfabrik Josetti, Inh. Meier & Peters oHG" in 1895. New premises in the Rosenthaler Straße 40, in the new Friedrichstrasse 9-10 in Hamburg and at the Zeughaus market 35-37 (1896-1902) had to be rented to produce the new cigarette. During this time, the Berlin Cigarettenfabrik Manoli with 200 workers belonged to the largest industry in the German Empire.

- In 1905, the Jasmatzi AG in Dresden took over Josetti GmbH (since 1902 under the leadership of the American Tobacco Company (now British American Tobacco). In addition to the main brand JUNO as a round cigarette with and without filters, the brands VERA and ELJEN were also produced.
- In 1908 the Manoli Cigarettenfabrik expanded its production against the competitors by moving into a new building complex at the Runge Street 22-24 in Berlin-Mitte 52°30′44.56″N 13°25′7.23″E, cast in 1921 in an AG.
- In 1910 a small plant in the Wusterhauser Straße 15-16 was set up for the Josetti GmbH company in close proximity (Berlin postal Borough SO 16) 52°30′39.31″N 13°25′13.03″E

During World War I, a state-run anti-trust campaign financed by Deutsche Bank was conducted against foreign holdings. In 1915, Deutsche Bank was able to buy back foreign shares in Jasmatzi AG.

=== Takeover by Reemtsma ===
A Reemtsma (Hamburg)-dominated interest group (IG) of several cigarette manufacturers such as Jasmatzi AG (Berlin), Yenidze GmbH (Dresden) and Constantin KG (Hanover, Dresden) was formed after the hyperinflation of 1923/24. in 1928, Reemtsma AG began a process of consolidation in the course of which they absorbed all their competitors into a single company with 14,000 employees by 1935.

- In 1924, Reemtsma took majority shareholding in OJSC Manoli (1000 employees) and moved the production of Josetti GmbH into the Manoli building at the Rungestraße 22-24, Berlin-Mitte.
- On February 18, 1928 Reemtsma registered its own trademark rights to the Josetti JUNO cigarette. At this time, Reemtsma was only involved in shares in Jasmatzi AG and its JUNO production.
- In 1930 the production of Manoli AG, whose trademark rights were further maintained only pro-forma, was discontinued. In In 1935, Reemtsma liquidated Manoli AG
- The popular saying "For a good reason is Juno round" of a "Berlin cigarette factory GmbH Hadlichstr. 44" as a trademark was registered on 26 April 1934. The local cigarette factory Garbáty GmbH was previously transferred to 50% of the Reemtsma group for political reasons.
- In 1935 Reemtsma took over all the shares of the competitors Jasmatzi AG, which was transformed into a KG. Jasmatzi had met until then the function to take over smaller competitors. Also the Garbáty GmbH was transformed into a KG and forcibly sold in 1938.

During World War II, the JUNO-cigarette end of 1943 was abruptly withdrawn from the market, as apparently the manufacturing plant in Berlin had been destroyed by air strikes.

=== Post war ===
After World War II had ended, Germany got split up into Allied-occupied Germany and through the division of Berlin was the German Democratic Republic in the possession of the former Josetti company documents (VEB Josetti), and the "Ost-JUNO" ("East JUNO" ) production (flat and oval) was incorporated into VEB Tabak Nordhausen. Reemtsma Hamburg produced from March 5, 1951 a "West JUNO" (thick and round) variant in Berlin. Later in the GDR followed the "Format 100 Juno Filter", these cigarettes had to demonstrate the superiority of the socialist system in everyday life through their extra length.

In the 1970s, the "West Juno" was first limited to the filter version and then withdrawn from the market due to poor sales, only in 1983 was a renewed placement in the German market. Reemtsma has since distributed the JUNO 100 ("traditional blend tobacco"), as well as the JUNO ("German blend tobacco", "long and round").

In May 2016, the Reemtsma Group announced that it had discontinued production of the Juno brand, due to the decision of Reemtsma to focus more on its main, big brands and because the EU introduced new packaging with shock picture warnings.

== Advertising ==
In the period up to the first World War, small stickers for everyday products were common as advertisement, who showed the price of two Pfennigs for a JUNO. The slogan of that time was "Fat and round". After the takeover by Reemtsma, the JUNO cigarette advertising was not just purely focused on Berlin, but also all throughout the German Empire and primarily in Hamburg. The advertising slogan was changed to "For a good reason Juno is round". The JUNO-cigarette costed four Reichspfennig (or two Dimes in the six-pack) at this time. JUNO advertisements were also frequently seen on buses throughout the 1920s, with the slogan "Berlin Raucht JUNO" ("Berlin Smokes JUNO")

In the post-war period, the matching advertising pad was texted and composed by Just Scheu, and Bully Buhlan recorded it with the orchestra Erich Börschel for a shellac advertising album in 1951.

== See also ==
- Tobacco smoking
