= Junius W. Peak =

Confederate soldier and Dallas city marshal

- Born: April 5, 1845; Warsaw, Kentucky, US
- Died: April 20, 1934 (aged 89); Dallas, Texas, US
- Military career
- Allegiance: Confederate States
- Branch: Confederate States Army
- Battles: American Civil War

Junius "June" Peak (April 5, 1845 – April 20, 1934) was a Confederate veteran of the American Civil War, a Dallas city marshal, and a Texas Ranger.

== Sources ==
- Perez, Joan J. (1952). "Peak, Junius W. (1845–1934)". Handbook of Texas (online ed.). Texas State Historical Association. April 7, 2018. Accessed 20 May, 2023.
