= Juneau (surname) =

Juneau is a surname. Notable people with the surname include:

- Carmen Juneau (1934–1999), Canadian politician
- Carol Juneau (born 1945), American politician
- Curry Juneau (born 1934), Canadian football player and coach
- Denis Juneau (1925–2014), Canadian painter
- Denise Juneau (born 1967), American attorney, educator, and politician
- Joé Juneau (born 1968), Canadian ice hockey player, Olympic medalist, and engineer
- Joe Juneau (prospector) (1836–1899), Canadian miner and prospector; founder of Juneau, Alaska
- Josette Vieau Juneau (1803-1855), Menominee humanitarian
- Madeleine Juneau (1945–2020), Canadian museologist, teacher, nun
- Michael J. Juneau (born 1962), American judge and lawyer
- Pierre Juneau (1922–2012), Canadian film and broadcast executive and civil servant; Juno Award namesake
- Solomon Juneau (1793–1856), Canadian fur trader, land speculator, and politician; a founder of Milwaukee, Wisconsin
- William Juneau (1879–1949), American football player and college sports coach

== See also ==
- Michel Juneau-Katsuya, Canadian intelligence officer, criminal investigator, and author
- Juneau (disambiguation)
