= Juneau, Pennsylvania =

Coordinates: 40°53′18″N 078°57′45″W

Juneau is a populated place in Indiana County, Pennsylvania, United States.

The city shares a name with Juneau, Alaska and Juneau, Wisconsin

== See also ==
- Canoe Township, Indiana County, Pennsylvania
