= Mitsubishi Vulcan engine =

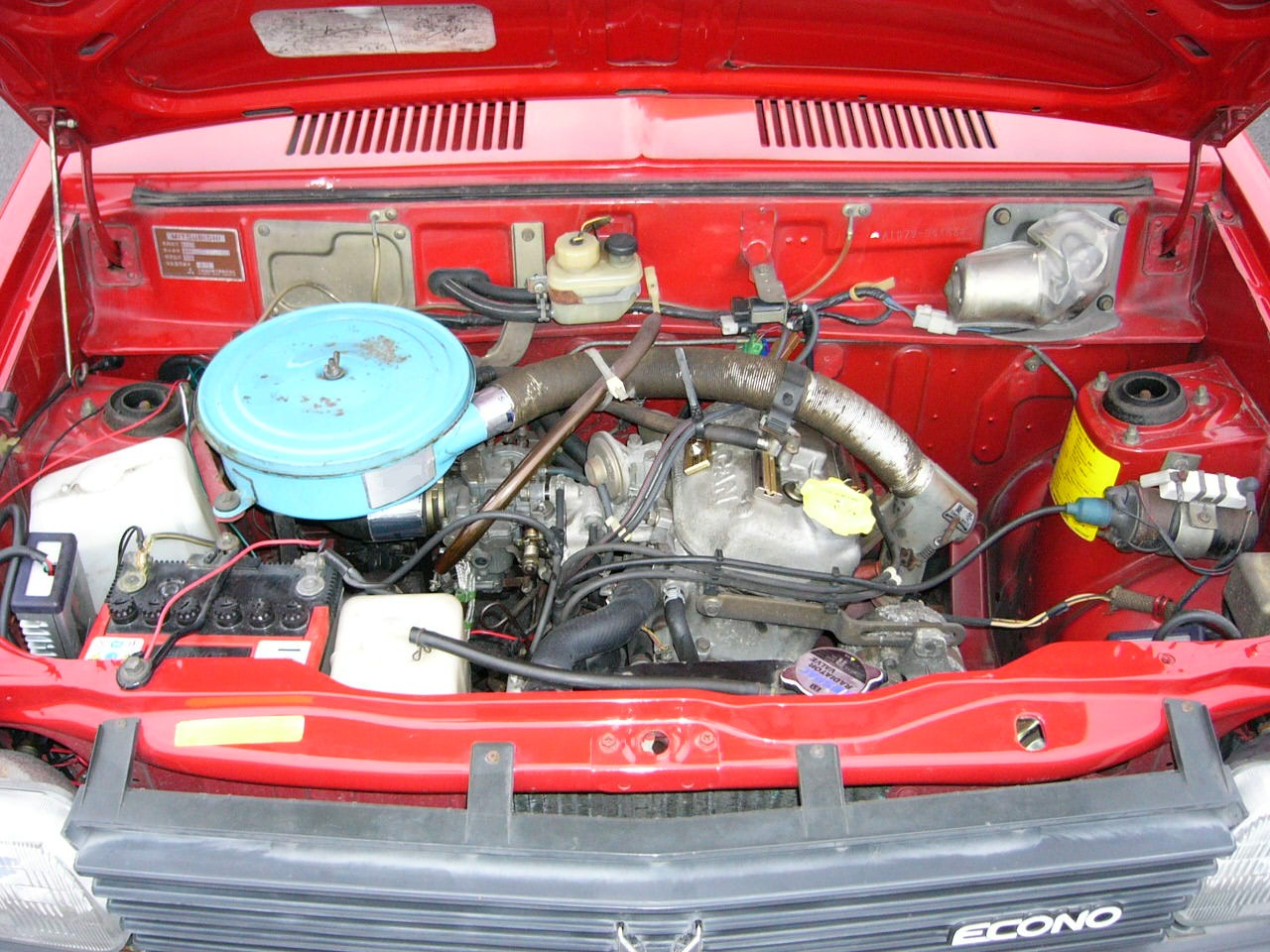

Overview
- Manufacturer: Mitsubishi Motors
- Also called: Vulcan
- Production: 1972–1989

Combustion
- Fuel type: Gasoline

Chronology
- Predecessor: Mitsubishi 2G1 engine
- Successor: Mitsubishi 3G8 engine

The Mitsubishi Vulcan engine, identified by the code 2G2, is an iron-block twin cylinder engine with three main bearings, built by Mitsubishi Motors for kei car class vehicles from September 1972. It was an overhead camshaft design, and superseded the older two-stroke 2G1 series. The 2G2 was in turn replaced by the Multi-valve 3G8 three-cylinder series.

== 2G21 ==
=== Specifications ===
Engine type	Twin cylinder OHC
Displacement	359 cc
Bore × stroke	62.0 × 59.6 mm
Fuel type	Regular gasoline
Peak power	30 PS (22 kW) at 6,000 rpm (Minica F4, Minicab 4) "Vulcan S", December 1974 on, with "Silent Shaft" balance shafts. (MCA-II)
Peak power	32 PS (24 kW) at 8,000 rpm (Minica F4) First version, without balance shafts. (MCA) 30PS in 1974.
Peak power	36 PS (26 kW) at 8,500 rpm (Minica F4 GS, GSL, Minica Skipper IV) "Sports Series" with twin carbs. The F4 sports series was discontinued in October 1973.
Peak torque	3.0 kg⋅m (29.4 N⋅m) at 4,000 rpm (MCA-II)
Peak torque	3.0 kg⋅m (29.4 N⋅m) at 5,500 rpm (MCA)
Peak torque	3.2 kg⋅m (31.4 N⋅m) at 6,500 rpm (twin-carb sports)

"MCA" stood for "Mitsubishi Clean Air", reflecting Japan's new air quality laws. The MCA-II was cleaner yet, and with balance shafts it also offered a much smoother run, at the loss of a few horsepower. The Sports engine did not meet the stricter emissions laws, which led to the demise of the Skipper.

=== Applications ===
- 10.1972-04.1976 Mitsubishi Minica F4
- 10.1972-12.1974 Mitsubishi Minica Skipper IV

== 2G22 ==
=== Specifications ===
Engine type	Twin cylinder SOHC
Displacement	471 cc
Bore × stroke	65.0 × 71.0 mm
Fuel type	Regular gasoline, 9.0:1 compression
Peak power	21 kW (28 PS) at 6000 rpm: Minica 5 Van, Minicab 5 22 kW (30 PS) at 6500 rpm: Minica 5 Sedan
Peak torque	3.7 kg⋅m (36.3 N⋅m) at 4000 rpm (all)

This engine met the enlarged kei-jidosha regulations which took effect at the end of 1975. It was called the Vulcan S in period advertising and went on sale in mid-April 1976; it was the first of the new, enlarged class of kei cars to hit the market. It had been thought that the rules would only allow for 500 cc, so a number of manufacturers had to quickly develop 550 cc models. The 2G22 was only built for ten months.

=== Applications ===
- 1976.04-1977.06 Mitsubishi Minica 5
- 1976.04-1977.03 Mitsubishi Minica 5 Van
- 1976.04-1977.03 Mitsubishi Minicab 5 (truck)

== 2G23 ==
The G23B engines also featured the MCA-JET improved emissions system with a catalytic converter and three valves per cylinder. For the last two years (until summer of 1989), production was only for the Mazda Porter.

=== Specifications ===
Engine type	Twin cylinder SOHC
Displacement	546 cc
Bore × stroke	70.0 × 71.0 mm
Fuel type	Regular gasoline
Peak power	22 kW (29 PS) at 5500 rpm (2G23) Minicab 55 Wide/Minica 55 Van/Econo only (with catalytic converter), Mazda Porter Cab 23 kW (31 PS) at 5500 rpm (2G23) Minica, Minicab after 1979
Peak power	23 kW (31 PS) at 5500 rpm (G23B Vulcan II with timing chain) 23 kW (31 PS) at 6000 rpm (G23B Vulcan II with timing belt), 84-87 Minica Econo, Minicab 24 kW (33 PS) at 6000 rpm (G23B Vulcan II with timing belt), 84-87 Minica
Peak power	29 kW (39 PS) at 5500 rpm (G23B Turbo), Minica Ami/Econo 03.83-02.84 31 kW (42 PS) at 6000 rpm (G23B Turbo Intercooler)
Peak torque	4.1 kg⋅m (40.2 N⋅m) at 3000 rpm (2G23) 4.2 kg⋅m (41.2 N⋅m) at 3000 rpm (2G23) in Minica 55 Van, Minicab 55 Wide until 1979
Peak torque	4.2 kg⋅m (41.2 N⋅m) at 3500 rpm (G23B) 43 (or 44) Nm at 3500 rpm (84-87)
Peak torque	54 Nm at 3500 rpm (G23B Turbo) 57 Nm at 3500 rpm (G23B Turbo Intercooler)

=== Applications ===
- 1977-1979 Mitsubishi Minicab Wide 55 (LO13)
- 1979-1987 Mitsubishi Minicab (truck)
- 03.1977-09.1981 Minica 55 Van
- 06.1977-02.1984 Mitsubishi Minica Ami 55/Ami L/Econo
- 02.1984-01.1987 Mitsubishi Minica/Econo 5th generation
- 1977-1981 Mitsubishi L100
- 1977-83 Mazda New Porter Cab (2G23)
- 1983-07.1989 Mazda Porter Cab (G23B)

== 2G24 ==
=== Specifications ===
Engine type	Twin cylinder SOHC
Displacement	644 cc
Bore × stroke	76.0 × 71.0 mm
Fuel type	Regular gasoline
Peak power	?
Peak torque	?

Produced 8.82-12.83

=== Applications ===
- 11.1981–1983 Mitsubishi Minicab 700 (truck)
- 1985-1990s Liuzhou Wuling LZ110

== 2G25 ==
=== Specifications ===
Engine type	Twin cylinder SOHC
Displacement	783 cc
Bore × stroke	78.0 × 72.0 mm (according to various sources, although this would make it 688 cc)
Fuel type	Regular gasoline
Peak power	?
Peak torque	?

Produced 1.84-11.88

=== Applications ===
- 1984 Mitsubishi Towny (Minica) (Taiwan)
- 1984 Mitsubishi Minicab 800 (truck)

== See also ==
- List of Mitsubishi engines
