= Juni Lake =

Lake in Brown County, Minnesota

- Location within Minnesota Location within the United States
- Location: Brown County, Minnesota, United States
- Coordinates: 44°13′7″N 94°31′48″W
- Type: Natural
- Basin countries: United States
- Surface area: 62.54 acres (253,100 m^{2})
- Surface elevation: 991 feet (302 m)

Juni Lake is a lake in Brown County, Minnesota, in the United States. The lake is a 62.5-acre (25.3 ha) protected body of water.

== History ==
Juni Lake was named for Benedict Juni, a Swiss settler.

== See also ==
- List of lakes of Minnesota
- List of fishes of Minnesota
