= Honda Juno =

Japanese scooter made 1954-1955

The Honda Juno is a scooter. Two versions were produced, the K-series of 1954 (K, KA, KB), and the M-series of 1962 (M80, M85).

== Juno K ==
Honda Juno K
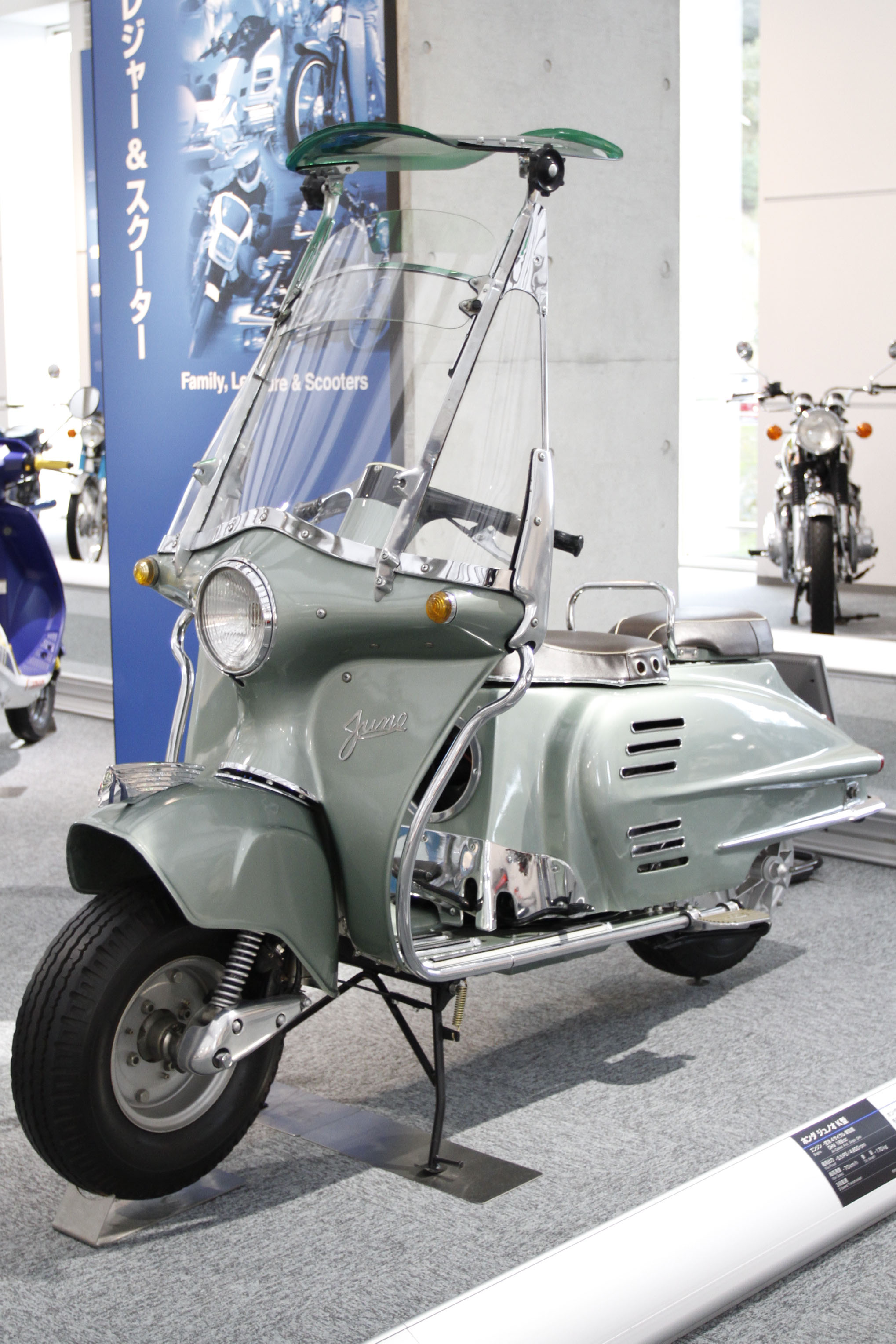
- Manufacturer: Honda Motor Company
- Production: 1954–1955
- Engine: 189 cc (11.5 cu in) [K], 220 cc (13 cu in) [KA & KB], four-stroke, OHV, single-cylinder
- Top speed: 70 km/h
- Power: 7.5 hp @ 4,800rpm [K], 9.0 hp @ 5,500rpm [KA & KB]
- Transmission: 3-speed manual
- Dimensions: L: 2,070 mm (81 in); W: 800 mm (31 in); H: 1,025 mm (40.4 in) [K & KA], 1,000 m (39,000 in) [KB]
- Weight: 170 kg [K], 195 kg [KA], 160 kg [KB] (dry)

The Juno K was a deliberately elaborate bike in 1954. It was Honda's first scooter and would be competing with the well established Fuji Rabbit and Mitsubishi Silver Pigeon. It featured the first electric start, a full windscreen with a tilt-back sun-shade, and built-in signal lamps. It also introduced Fibre-Reinforced Plastic body construction to Japan.

Only 5,980 were produced in a year and a half. Kihachiro Kawashima, who retired as executive vice-president in 1979, remembered the bike as a "splendid failure": it was too expensive, the engine overheated, the FRP body was heavier than expected and made the bike underpowered and clumsy, the new cantilevered suspension was problematic, and customers did not like the motorcycle-style clutch operation.

The final Juno KB model can be distinguished by enlarged rear vents and new vents added to the windscreen.

Technology developed for the Juno K would be applied to later bikes. The electric start was re-introduced with the C71 Dream in 1957, and the new Plastics department under Shozo Tsuchida developed polyethylene components that would distinguish the Super Cub.

== Juno M80/M85 ==
Honda Juno M85
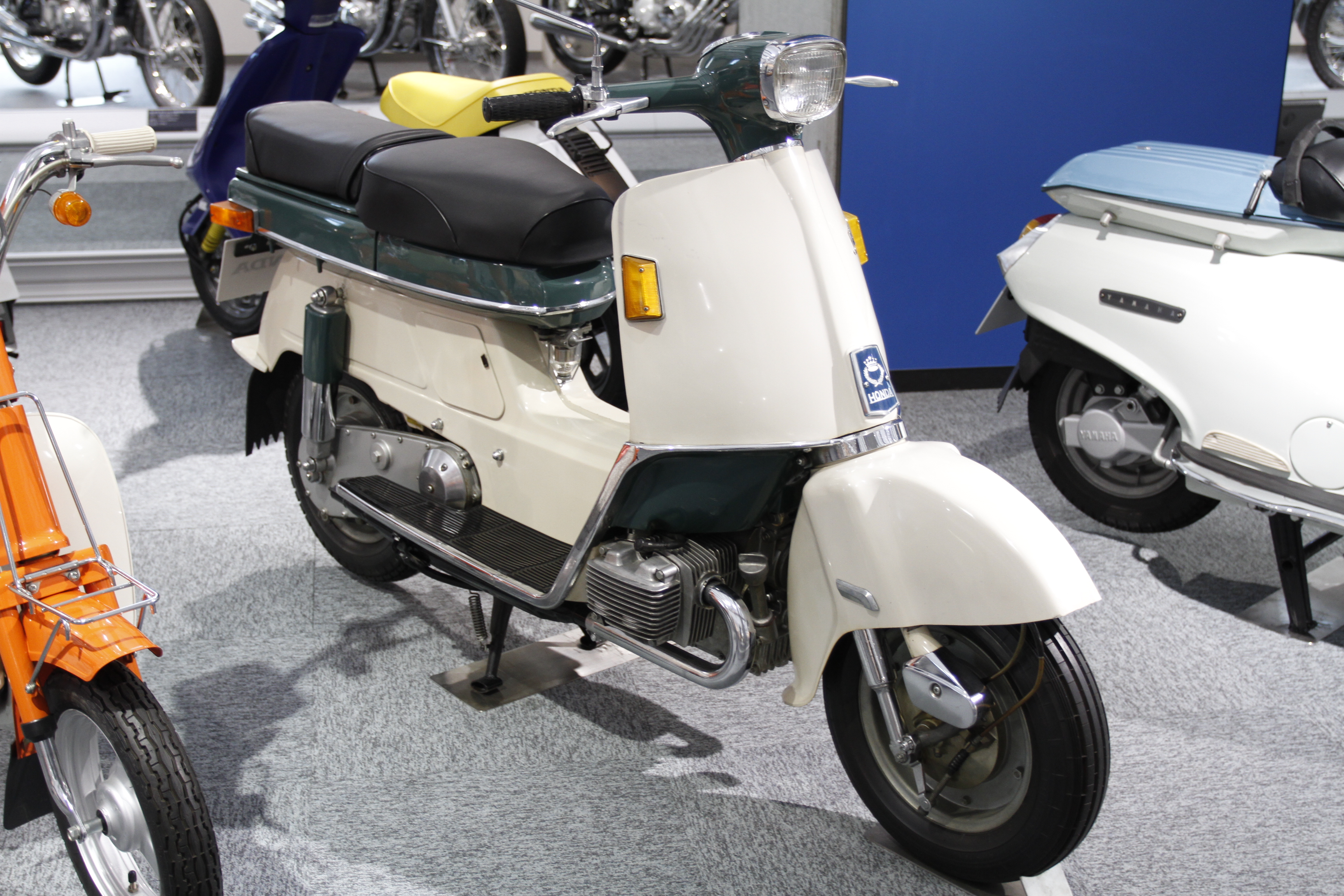
- Manufacturer: Honda Motor Company
- Production: 1962
- Engine: Opposed twin-cylinder, OHV, 4-stroke, 169 cc (10.3 cu in) [M80 124 cc (7.6 cu in)]
- Top speed: 100 km/h
- Power: 12 hp @ 7,600 rpm [M80 11 hp @ 9,000 rpm]
- Transmission: HRD hydraulic-mechanical
- Dimensions: L: 1,820 mm (72 in) [M80 1,810 mm (71 in)] W: 675 mm (26.6 in) [M80 665 mm (26.2 in)] H: 1,030 mm (41 in)
- Weight: 157 kg (346 lb) [M80 146 kg (322 lb)] (dry)

The Juno M80/M85 was a different approach, introduced in November 1961. Unlike the K-series, there is no upper windscreen, the engine is an exposed horizontal-twin rather than an enclosed fan-cooled unit, and the body construction is conventional monocoque steel rather than FRP panels over tube. The M80/M85 also introduced a clutchless Badalini-type hydraulic-mechanical transmission which would provide the basis for the later Hondamatic motorcycle transmissions.

The M80 and M85 are essentially the same vehicle, with the M85 designation indicating a mid-year engine enlargement. The Juno was discontinued by year-end with only 5,880 produced.

== See also ==
- List of motorcycles of the 1950s
