= Junie Sandgren =

Swedish actress (born 2004)

- Born: January 14, 2004 (age 22); Kalmar, Sweden
- Citizenship: Sweden
- Education: Jenny Nyströmsskolan
- Occupations: Actor, director
- Notable work: Kafka och Bulle; Skräckhistorier från Tornedalen

Junie Sandgren (born 14 January 2004) is a Swedish actress and director mainly known for her theatrical work. She is also a board member at Riksteatern Kalmar Län. She made her debut as a part of the theatrical troupe Teater Normalla, participating in the production of the play "Skräckhistorier från Tornedalen" at the Tornedalsteatern. In later years, she has been the director of the amateur theatrical troupe Klubb 22, directing their play "Kafka och Bulle".

== Early life ==
Junie Sandgren was born on January 14, 2004 in Kalmar, Sweden. She studied acting at the upper secondary school Jenny Nyströmsskolan.

== Career ==
She joined the acting troupe Teater Normalla in 2017, where she later acted in the play "Skräckhistorier från Tornedalen", produced by Nellie Skogsberg. The play was loosely based on the work of tornedalian author Erik Kuoksu and had performances in both Pajala and Kalmar. In 2023 she participated in action-horror movie DOM, directed by Daniel Lehmussaari. Between the 2024 and 2025 Sandgren directed the comedy "Kafka och Bulle" as a part of the acting troupe Klubb 22. The play had its premiere on the April 4, 2025. As of 2025, Junie Sandgren is a board member at Riksteatern Kalmar Län.
