= Mitsubishi Colt =

Subcompact car series produced by Mitsubishi

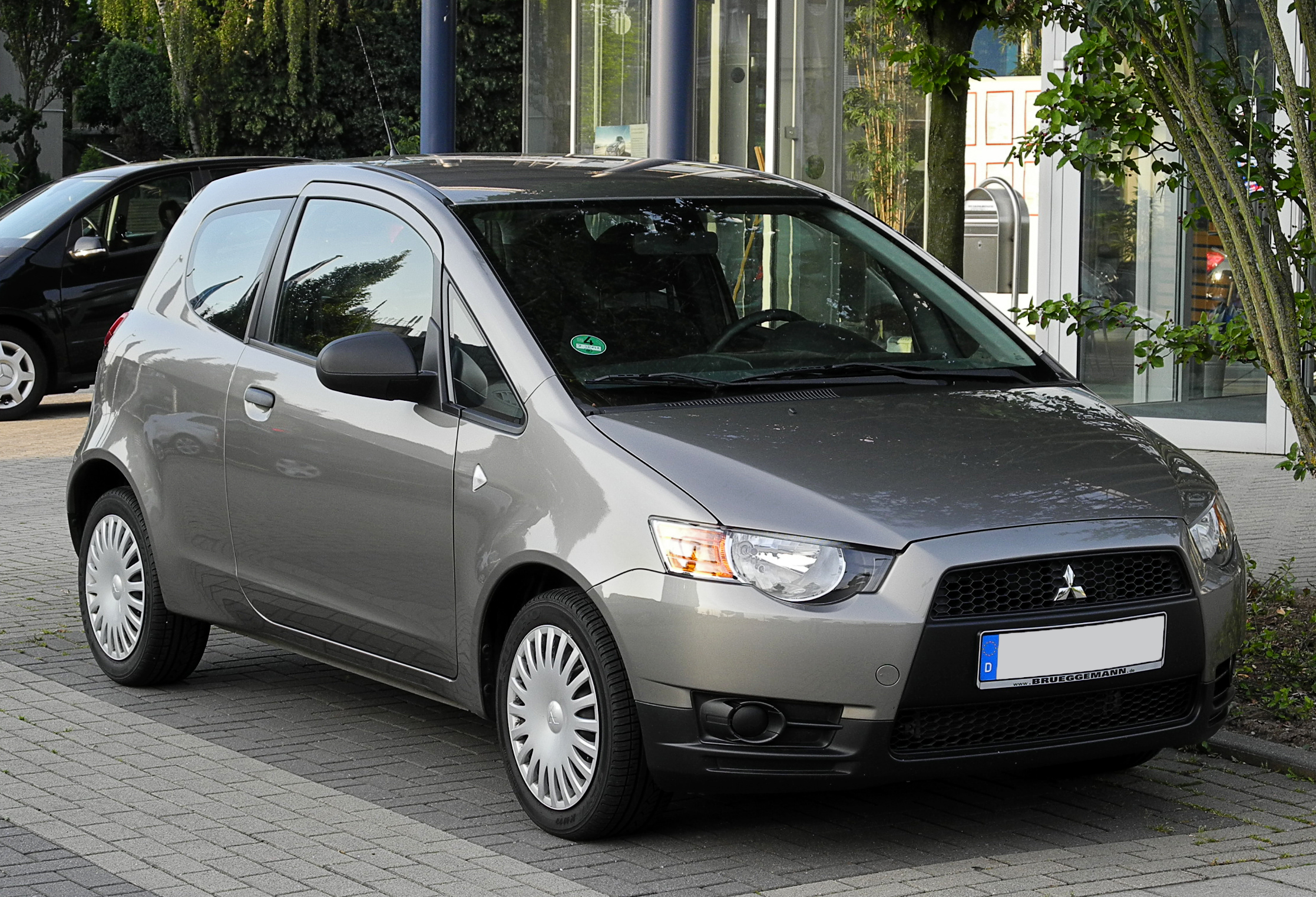
- 2008–2013 Mitsubishi Colt 3-door (Europe)

Overview
- Manufacturer: Mitsubishi Motors (1962–2014); Renault (2023–2025)
- Production: 1962–1971; 1978–2014; 2023–2025

The Mitsubishi Colt is a nameplate from Mitsubishi Motors that has been applied to a number of automobiles since 1962. It was first introduced with a series of subcompact cars in the 1960s, and then for the export version of the subcompact Mirage between 1978 and 2002. Chrysler, Mitsubishi's longtime partner, also used the name when applying its long-running practice of rebadging Mitsubishi vehicles as the Dodge and Plymouth Colt captive imports for the North American market between 1970 and 1994.

The most recent version was a subcompact car model manufactured between 2002 and 2013, sold under the Colt nameplate internationally. Mitsubishi replaced this series in 2013 with a newer generation which reverted to the Mirage name.

In addition to these small cars, "Colt" in the Mitsubishi vernacular has been used for unrelated vehicles of various forms as discussed below. The name has also been disaffiliated from Mitsubishi as an independent marque in some markets.

== Nameplate history ==
The "Colt" nameplate was first introduced in 1962, which started as a line of small cars sold predominantly in Japan. These models continued on in various similar forms until 1971. Between 1978 and 2002, the nameplate was applied to export versions of the Mirage in markets such as Europe and for a time, in Australia. Between 2002 and 2013, the nameplate was referred to a subcompact hatchback (and derivative body styles) that replaced the Mirage line. Unlike previously, the "Colt" nameplate was used internationally.

Various other unrelated models have been designated "Colt" over time as well. As the successor of the Colt 1500, the first generation Galant was marketed as the "Colt Galant"–including the closely related "Colt Galant GTO" sport car–in Japan and various export markets. The L200 pickup truck in South Africa utilised the "Colt" nameplate from 1992 to 2008. The nameplate is also used in export markets (mostly in Indonesia) for a series of light commercial vehicles consisting of Delica-based "Colt T100/T120/L300 (L030 only)" (1968–present), Suzuki Carry Futura-based "Colt T120SS" (1991–2019), and Canter-based "Colt Diesel" (1975–2022; T200/T210, FE1, FE3/FE4, FE7/FE8 only).

Colt was also used as a marque from 1974 to 1984 by the Colt Car Company to market Mitsubishi vehicles in the United Kingdom, where the name had unfortunate associations with the Mitsubishi A6M Zero fighter plane from World War II, while also being hard to pronounce. In New Zealand, the Colt brand ceased in favour of the Mitsubishi name in 1970, upon the release of the "Dyna-wedge" Galant model.

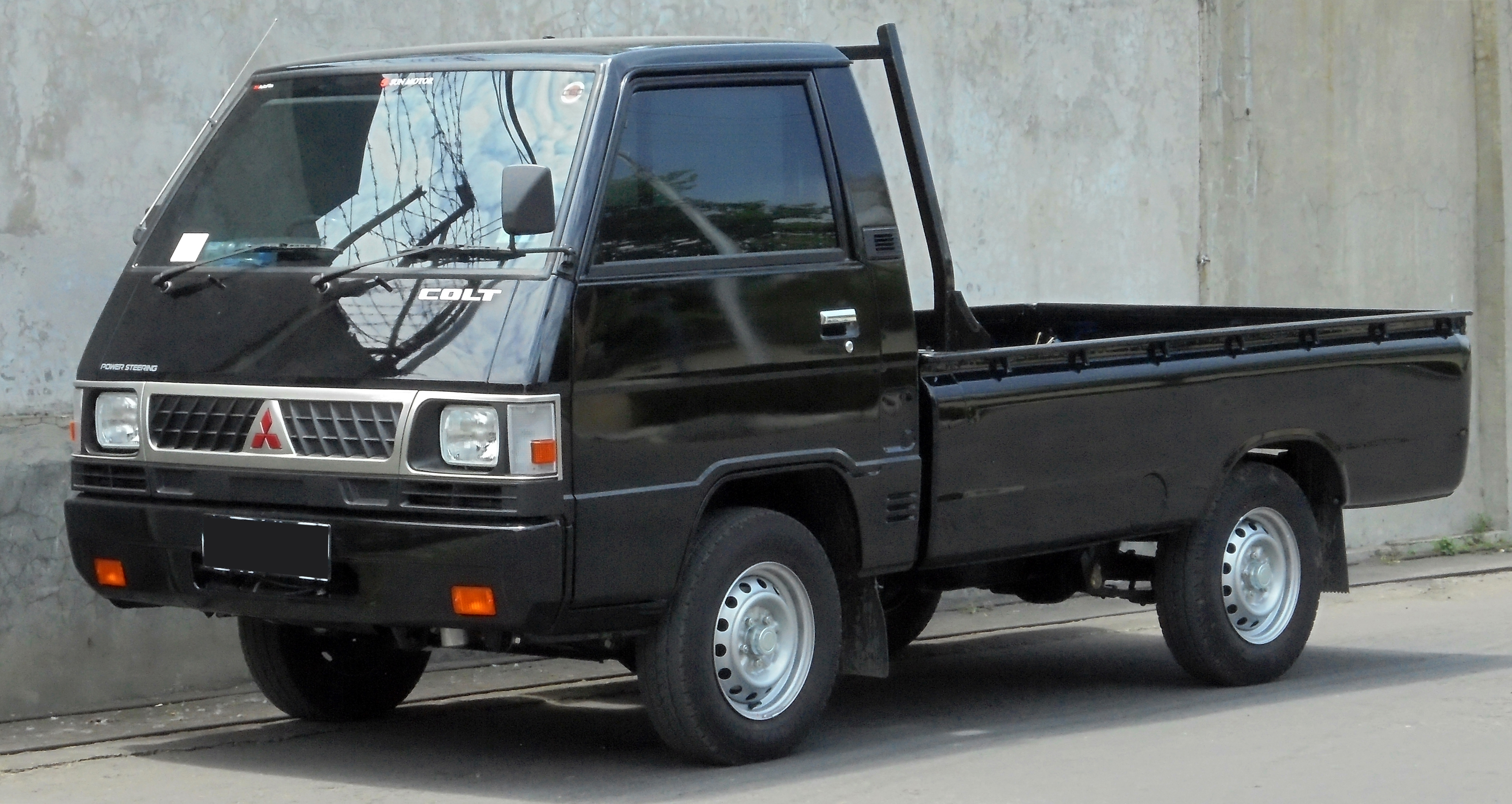
Indonesian-market Mitsubishi Colt L300

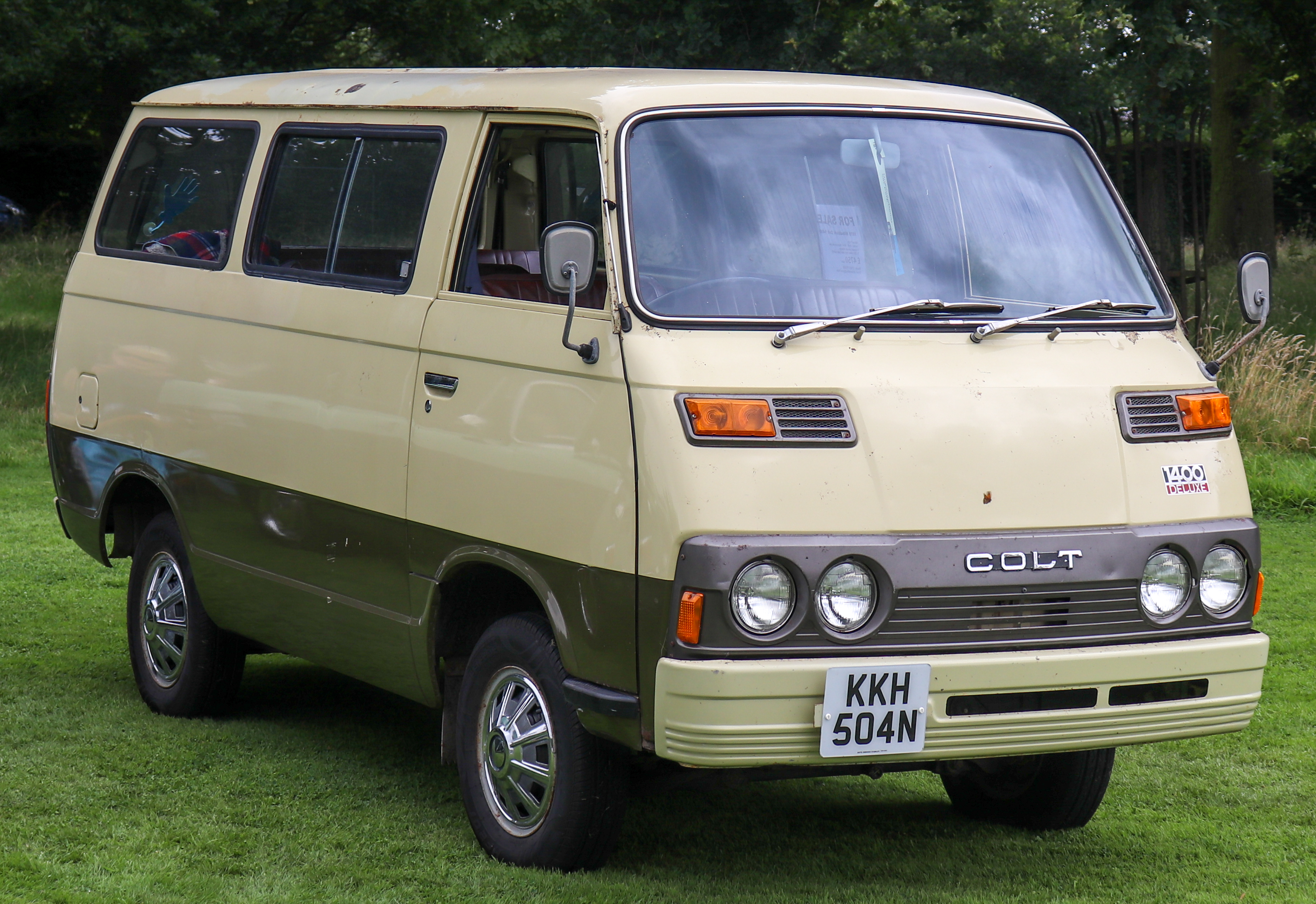
Export-market Colt T120

Indonesian-market Mitsubishi Colt T120SS

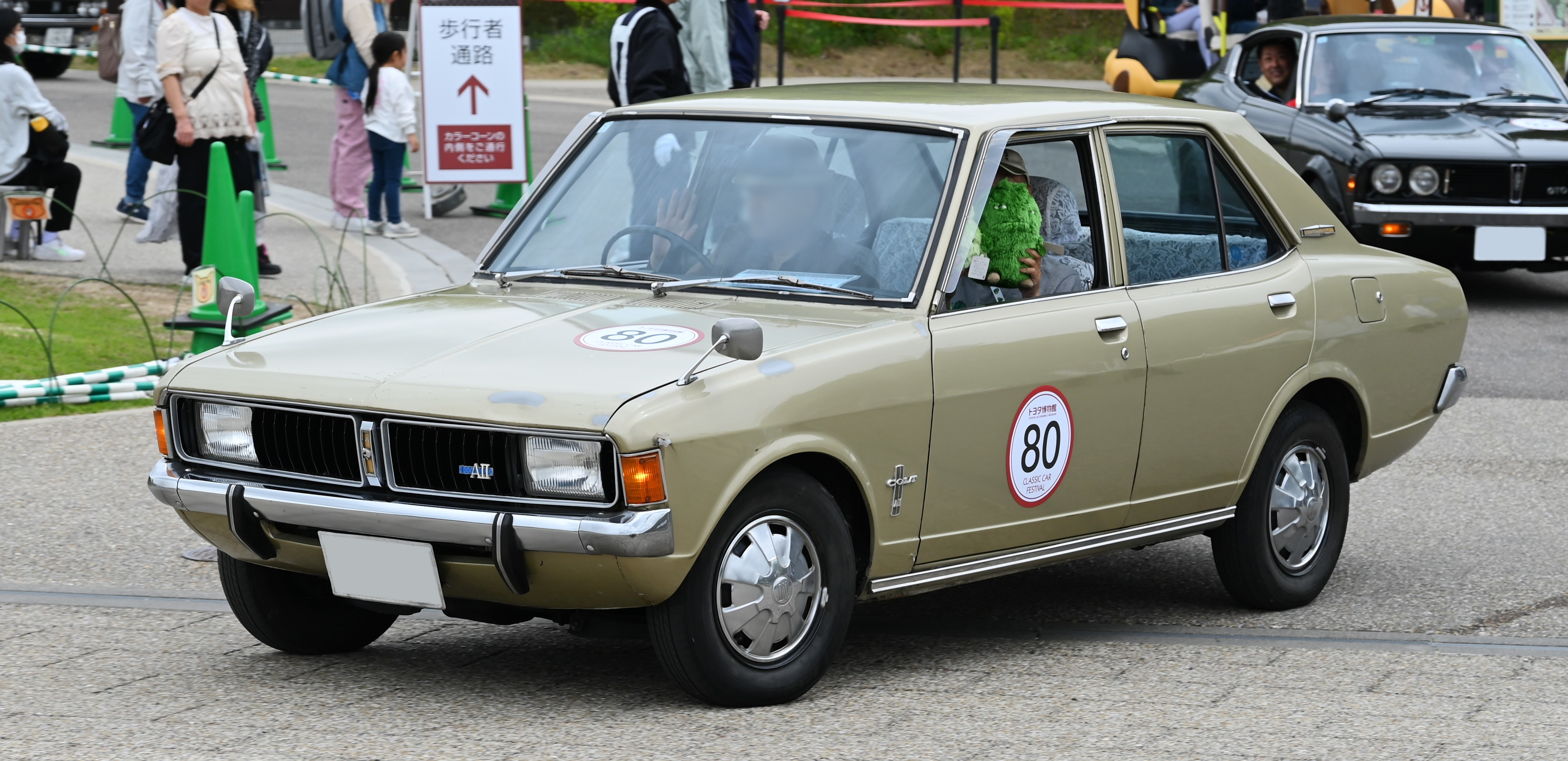
Japanese-market Mitsubishi Colt Galant

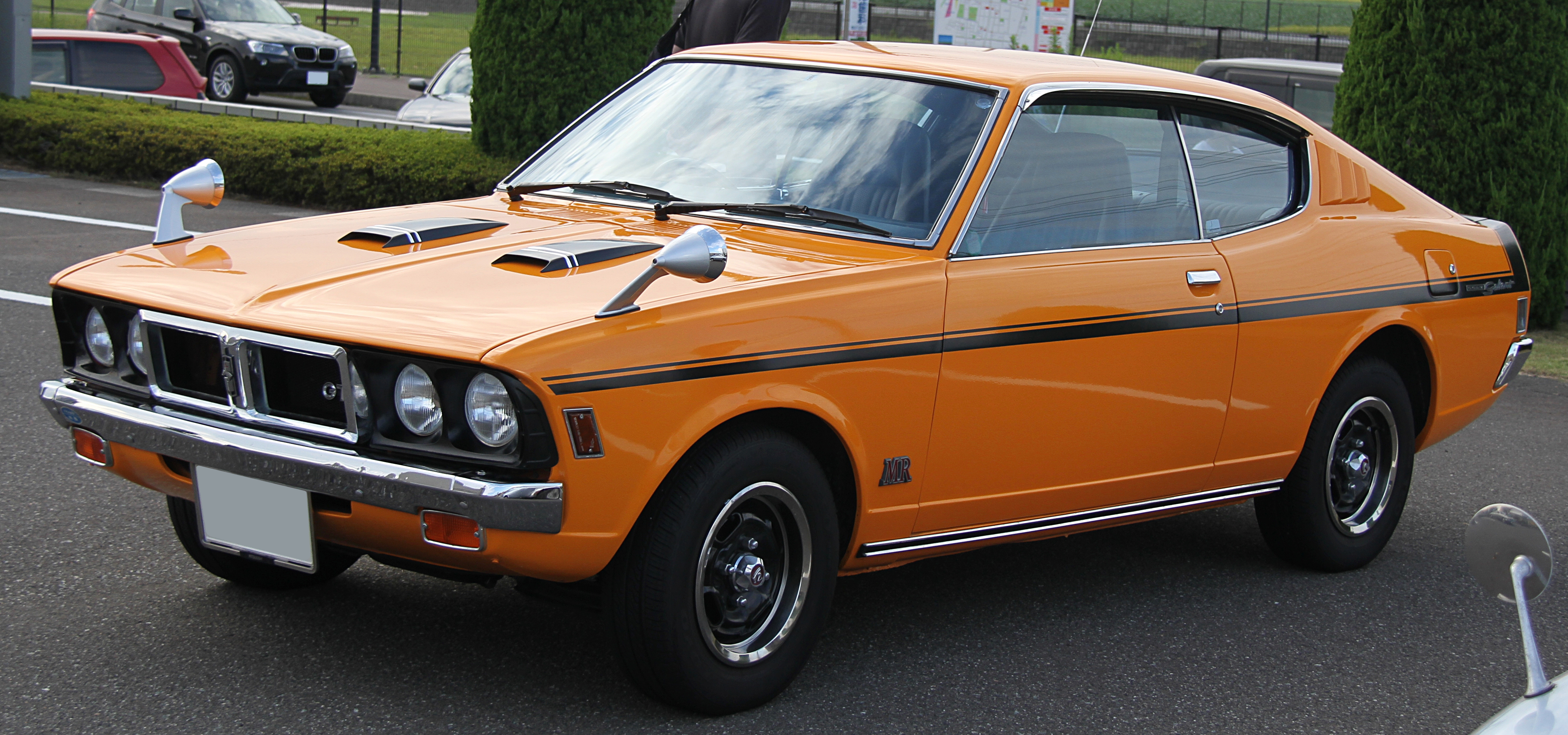
Japanese-market Mitsubishi Colt Galant GTO

UK-market Colt Sigma

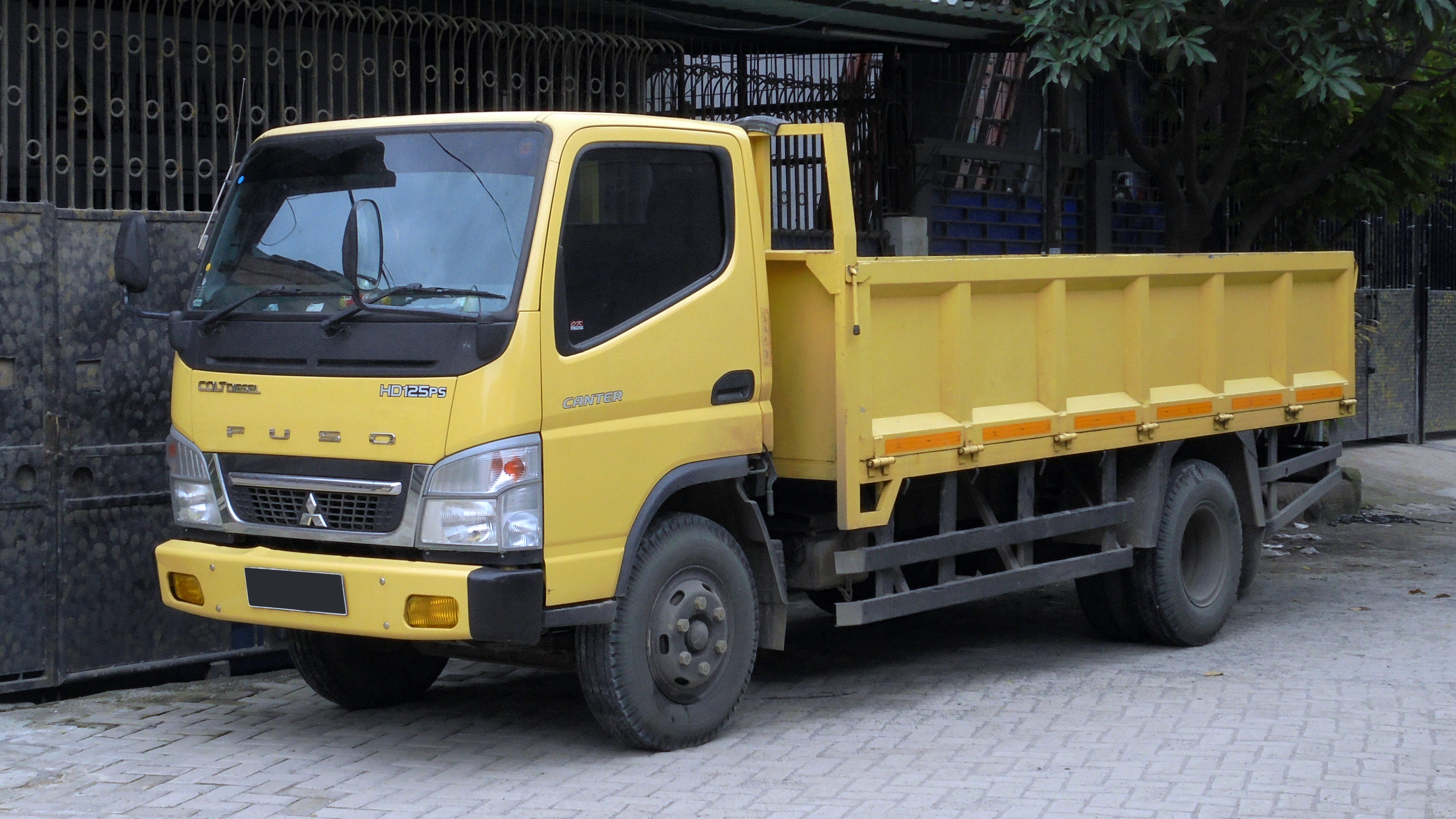
Indonesian-market Mitsubishi Fuso Colt Diesel FE7

== Colt 600, 800, 1000, 1100, 1200, 1500 (1962–1971) ==
Mitsubishi introduced the "Colt" name in 1962 on the Mitsubishi Colt 600, the first of a line of small family cars complementing their Mitsubishi 500, the company's first post-war passenger car. The Colt 600 is powered by a 594 cc NE35B OHV air-cooled straight-twin engine. At this time, Mitsubishi did not yet exist as an autonomous company, and vehicles were being produced by three regional subsidiaries of Mitsubishi Heavy Industries. MHI, which had been formally dismantled after World War II, resumed operating as a single entity in 1964, but continued to use the "Colt" marque until the 1970s in Asia, and the 1980s in Europe.

To complement the 600, a larger compact car was introduced in 1963, the Colt 1000. The larger Colt 1500 arrived in 1965, the Colt 1100 replaced the Colt 1000 in 1966, and the Colt 1200 took the 1100's place in 1968.

The third Colt line was the smaller, fastback Colt 800 and its derivatives the 1000F, 1100F, and 11-F. This series was built from 1965 until late 1971.

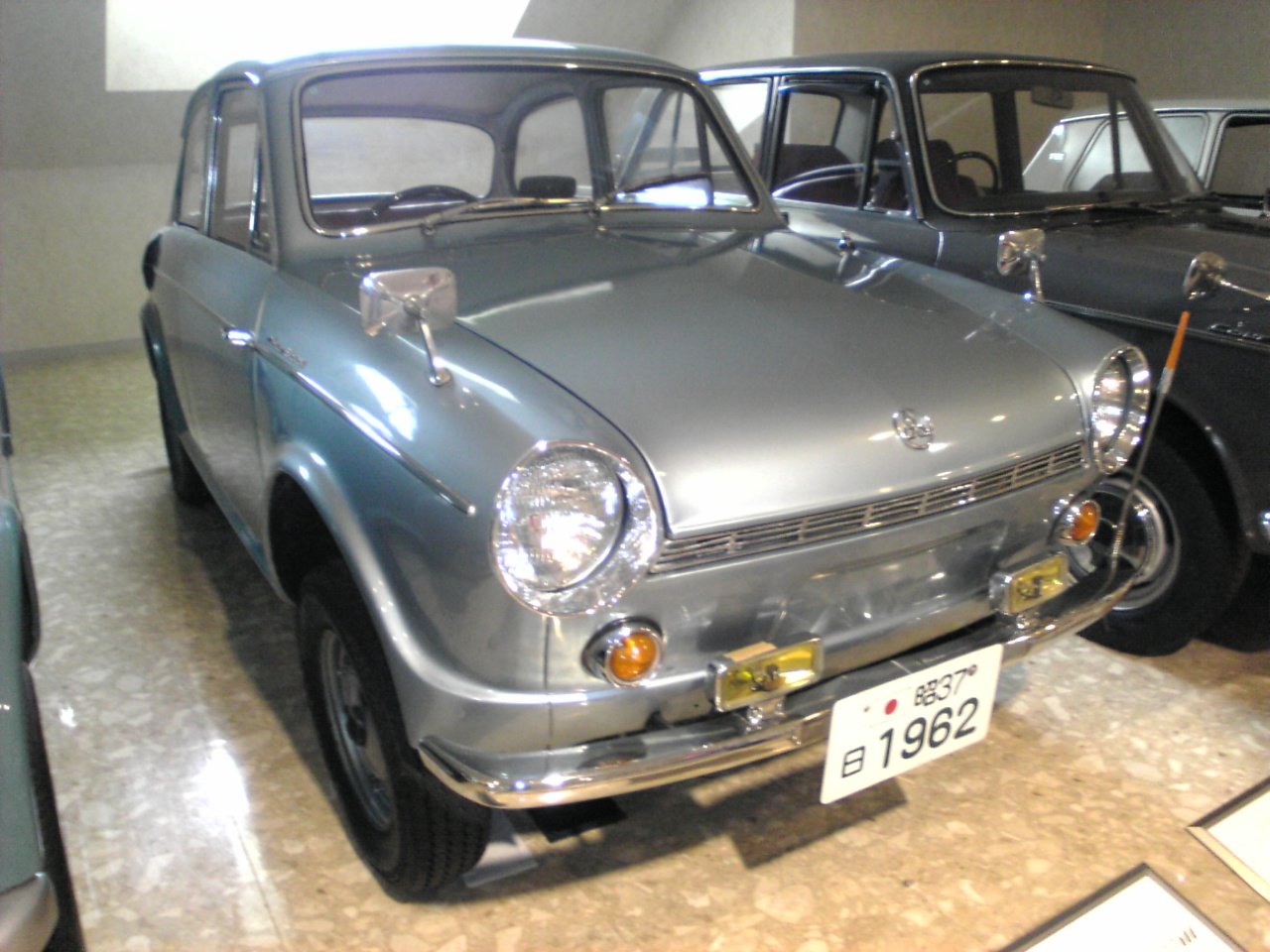
Mitsubishi Colt 600

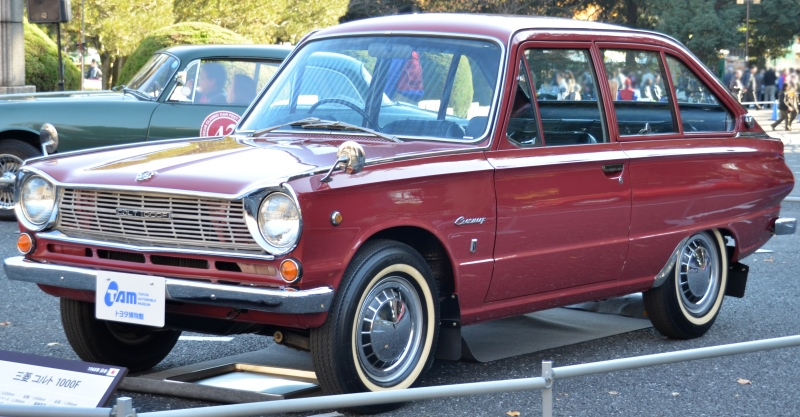
Mitsubishi Colt 1000F

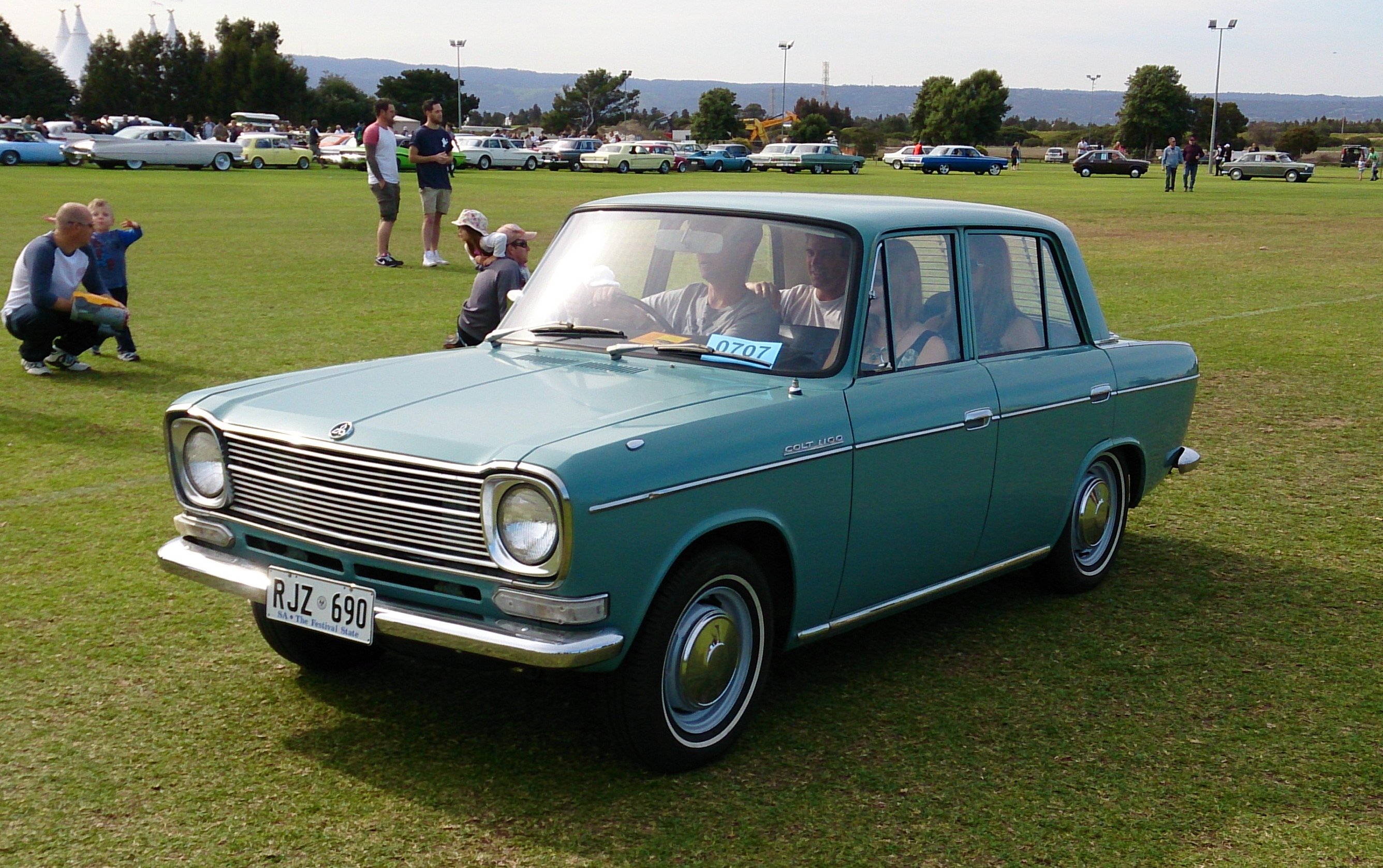
Mitsubishi Colt 1100

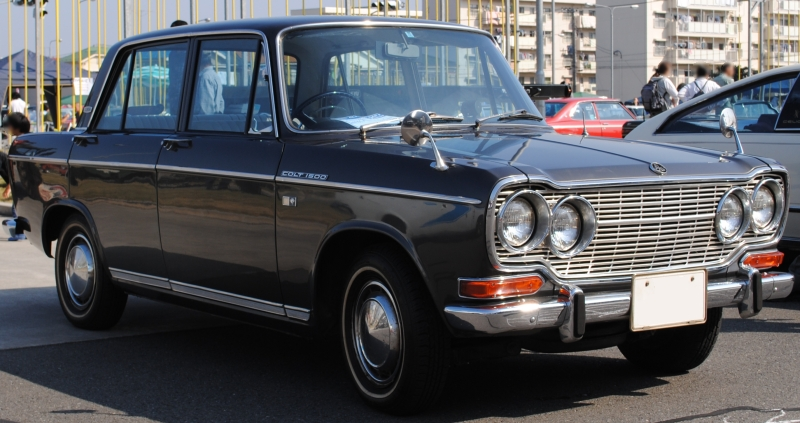
Mitsubishi Colt 1500

== Mirage-based Colt (1978–2002) ==
Mitsubishi reintroduced the Colt nameplate as a front-wheel drive hatchback in 1978, with a sedan later released in 1982. Sold in Japan as the Mirage, the Colt name was restricted to markets such as Europe and Australia (where the Colt was built by Mitsubishi Motors Australia from 1982 to late 1989).

Five generations of Mirage-based Colts were sold between 1978 and 2002, with new generations released in 1983, 1987, 1991, and 1995. These Mirage derivatives were sold in various forms as the Mitsubishi Lancer in many markets, with the Colt nameplate in Europe typically restricted to the hatchback variants; coupes, sedans and station wagons were relegated to the Lancer name.

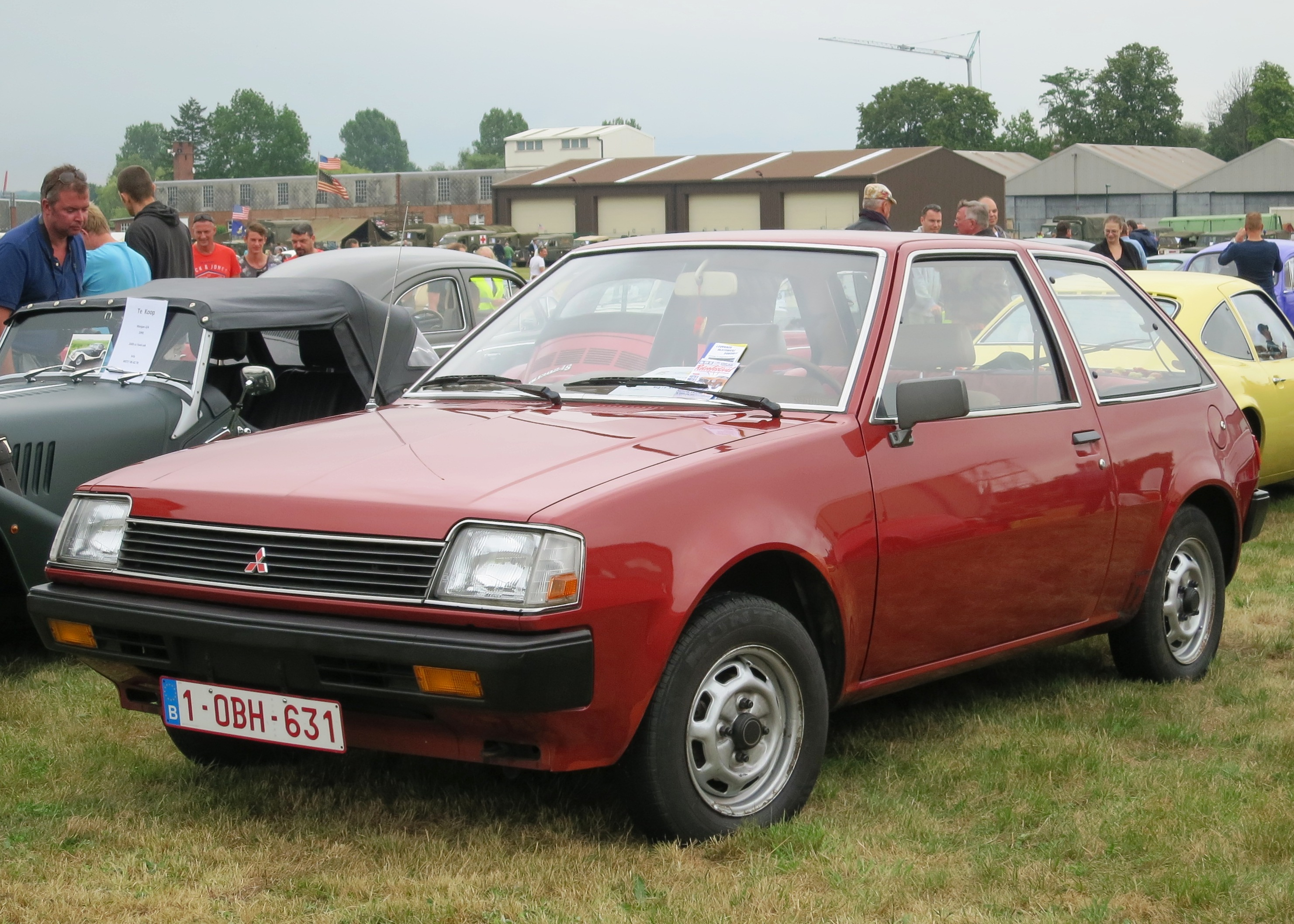
1978–1983

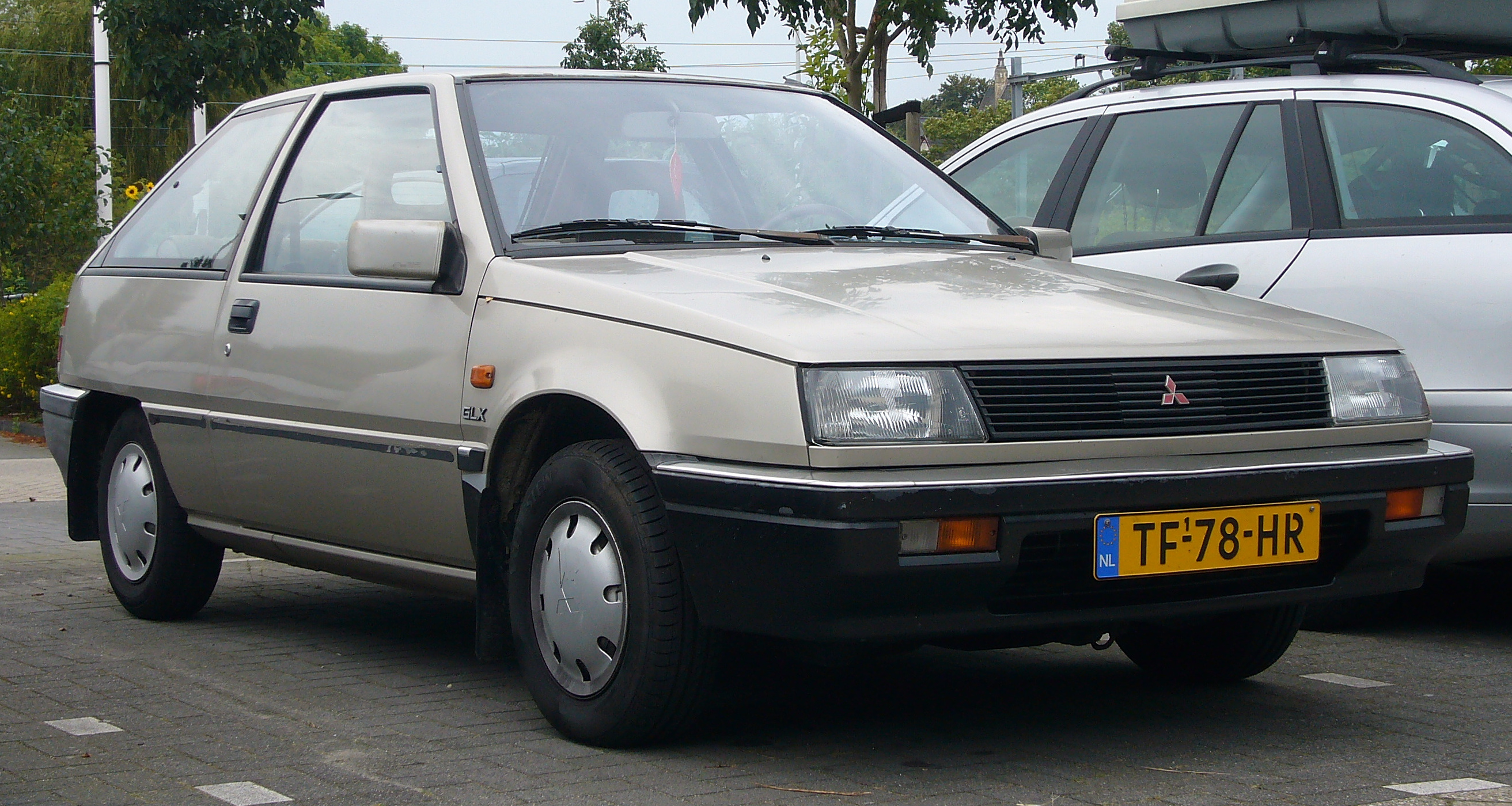
1983–1987

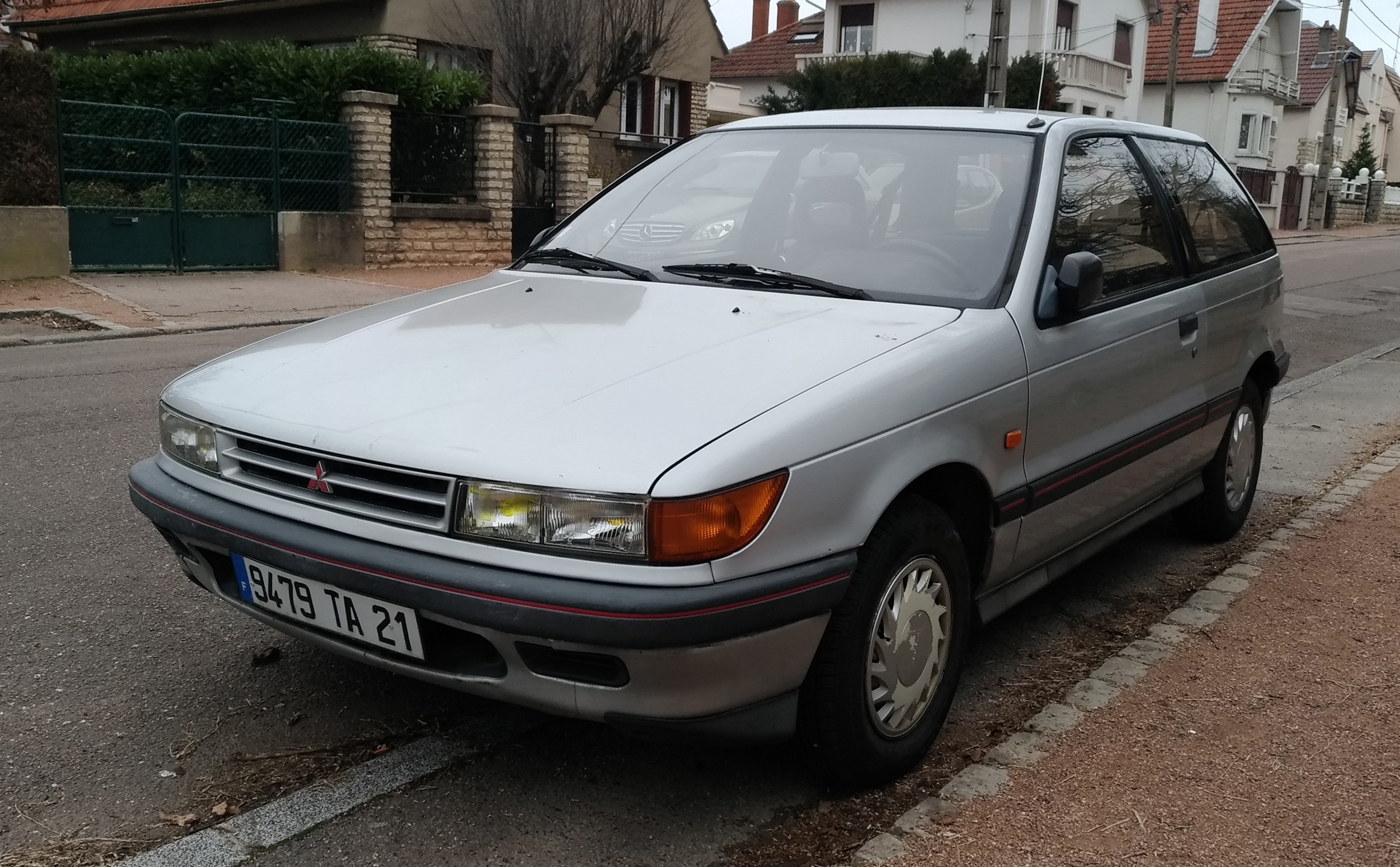
1987–1991

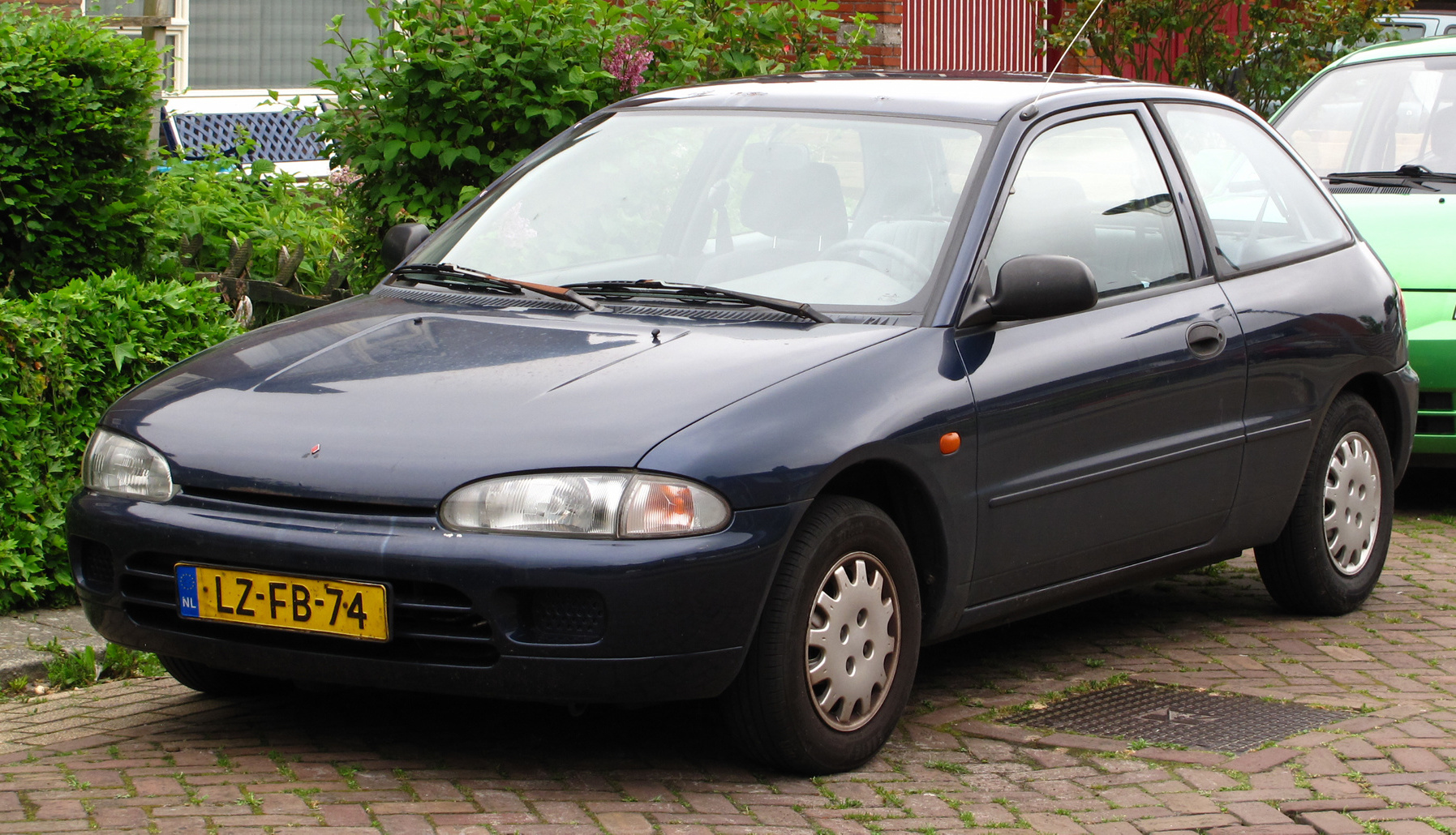
1991–1995

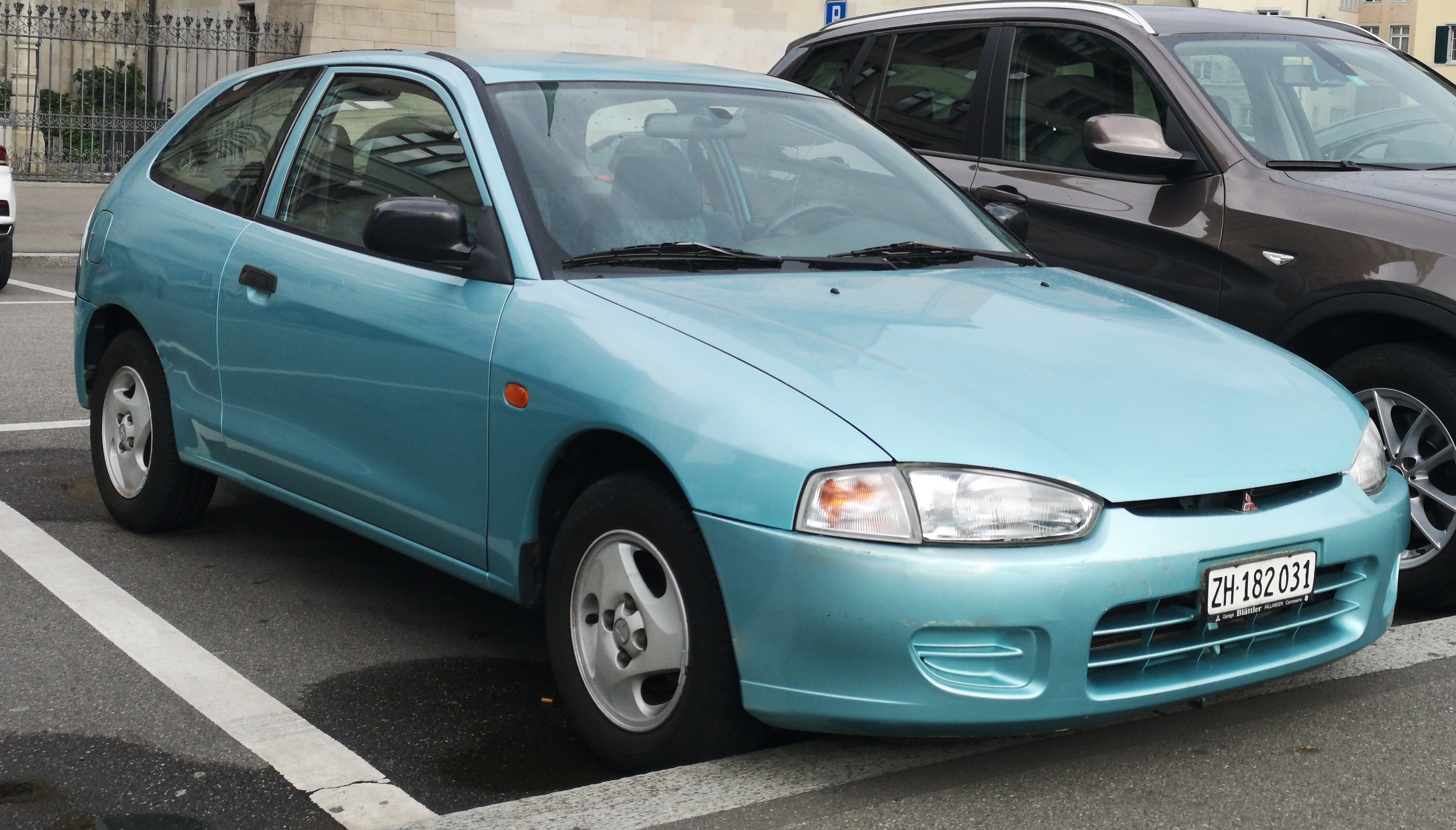
1995–2002

== Colt (Z20/Z30; 2002) ==
Mitsubishi Colt (Z20/Z30)
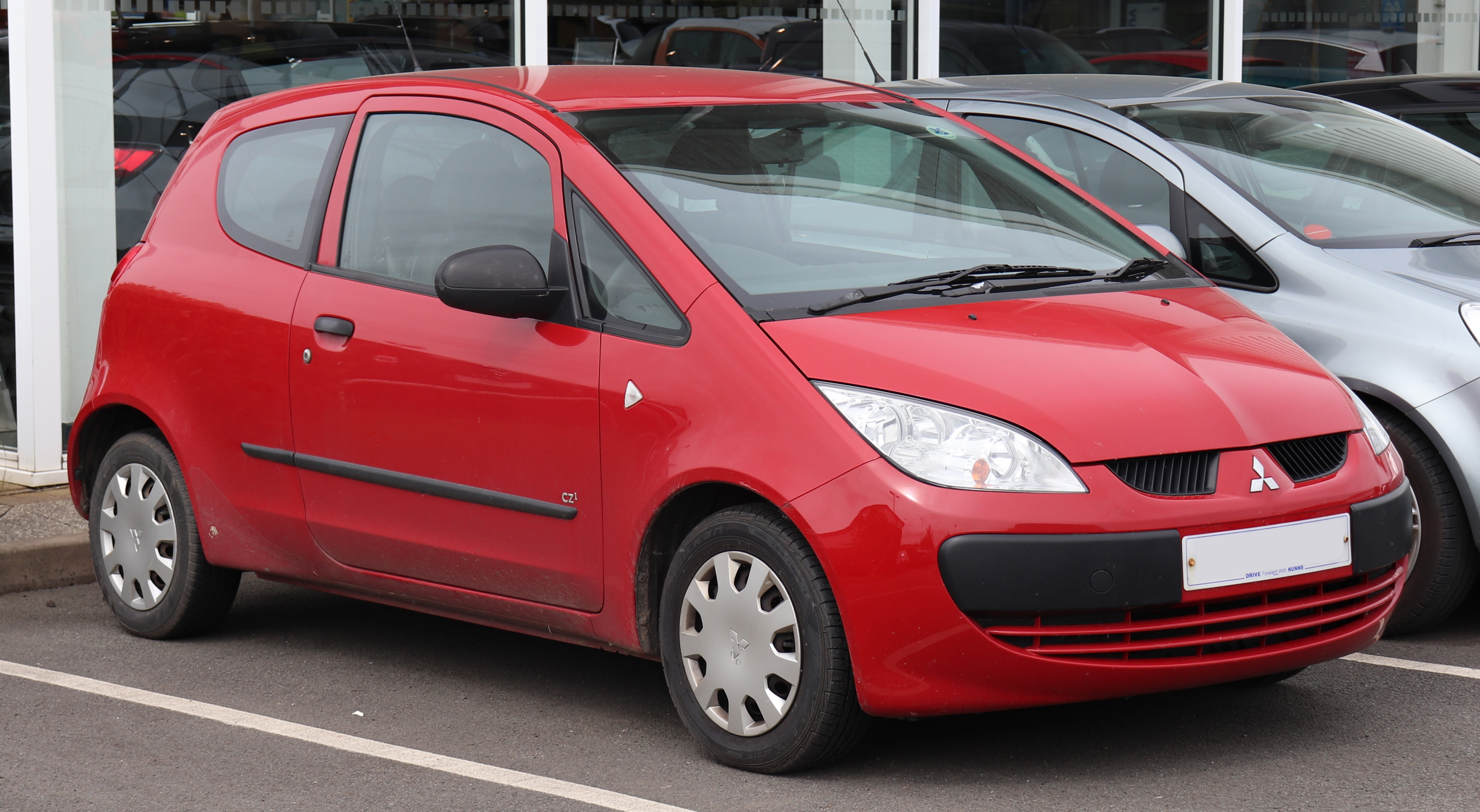
- 2004–2008 Mitsubishi Colt 3-door (Z30)

Overview
- Production: October 2002–January 2013; April 2004–December 2012 (Europe); October 2004–August 2012 (Colt Plus); March 2007–present (Colt Plus, Taiwan)
- Assembly: Japan: Okazaki, Aichi (Nagoya Plant); Netherlands: Born (NedCar; European market only); Italy: Turin (Pininfarina; CZC only); Taiwan: Taoyuan (CMC; Colt Plus only)
- Designer: Olivier Boulay; Omer Halilhodžić; Ken Okuyama at Pininfarina (Colt CZC)

Body and chassis
- Class: Subcompact car (B)
- Body style: 3-door hatchback; 5-door hatchback; 5-door station wagon (Colt Plus); 2-door retractable hardtop (Colt CZC)
- Layout: Front-engine, front-wheel-drive; Front engine, four-wheel-drive (Japan only)
- Platform: Mitsubishi Z platform
- Related: Smart Forfour; Senova X25; Senova D20; Changhe Q25

Powertrain
- Engine: Petrol: 1.1 L 3A91 DOHC MIVEC I3 (Z31A/Z32A); 1.3 L 4A90 DOHC MIVEC I4 (Z21A/Z21W/Z22A/Z22W/Z33A/Z34A/Z35A); 1.3 L 4G19 DOHC MIVEC I4 (Z25A/Z26A); 1.5 L 4A91 DOHC MIVEC I4 (Z23A/Z23W/Z24A/Z24W/Z36A/Z37A); 1.5 L 4G15 DOHC MIVEC I4 (Z27A/Z28A); 1.5 L 4G15T DOHC MIVEC turbo I4 (Z27A/Z27AG/Z27W/Z27WG/Z37A); 1.6 L 4G18 SOHC MIVEC I4 (Z29W); Diesel: 1.5 L Mercedes-Benz OM639 DI-D turbodiesel I3 (Z38A/Z39A/Z39V)
- Transmission: 5-speed manual; CVT (Z20 only); 6-speed AMT (Z30 only)

Dimensions
- Wheelbase: 2,500 mm (98.4 in)
- Length: 3,810–3,880 mm (150.0–152.8 in) (3-door); 3,870–3,925 mm (152.4–154.5 in) (Z20 5-door); 3,870–3,940 mm (152.4–155.1 in) (Z30 5-door); 3,875 mm (152.6 in) (Colt CZC); 4,170–4,390 mm (164.2–172.8 in) (Colt Plus)
- Width: 1,680 mm (66.1 in); 1,695 mm (66.7 in) (Z30 and Ralliart Version-R)
- Height: 1,453 mm (57.2 in) (Colt CZC); 1,535 mm (60.4 in) (Ralliart Version-R); 1,550 mm (61.0 in)
- Curb weight: 930–1,070 kg (2,050–2,359 lb) (3-door); 965–1,140 kg (2,127–2,513 lb) (5-door); 1,070–1,170 kg (2,359–2,579 lb) (Colt Plus); 1,100–1,200 kg (2,425–2,646 lb) (Colt CZC)

Chronology
- Predecessor: Mitsubishi Mirage/Colt (1995); Mitsubishi Mirage Dingo; Mitsubishi Space Star (1998)
- Successor: Mitsubishi Mirage/Space Star (2012); Mitsubishi Delica D:2 (Colt Plus; Japan)

In November 2002, a new Colt was released by Mitsubishi in Japan with a design by Olivier Boulay and built on the same platform as the Smart Forfour. Bearing the Z20 model code, this also marked the return of the Colt nameplate in Japan since the Colt Galant GTO. Only the five-door body style was manufactured in Japan and initially powered by 1.3- and 1.5-litre DOHC MIVEC Orion engines, mated only to a CVT. The Z20 series Colt was only exported to a handful of right-hand drive countries in Asia-Pacific.

A European version made at Mitsubishi's NedCar facility followed into production in April 2004 and was given the Z30 model code. The models were powered by the newer 1.1-, 1.3-, and 1.5-litre DOHC MIVEC petrol 3/4A9 engines, and a 1.5-litre OM639 turbodiesel engine sourced from Mercedes-Benz (added in June). Unlike the Z20, the Z30 series came equipped with a standard five-speed manual transmission, and an optional six-speed automated manual transmission "Allshift" for engines above the base 1.1-litre.

The Japanese-built Z20 series underwent a facelift in October 2004, now powered by the 4A9 series engine as per the Z30 series. The high-performance Ralliart was also added to the line-up, powered by a turbocharged version of the 4G15 Orion series engine. This 1.5-litre high-performance engine was based on the 4G15 block, with a turbocharger and intercooler to aid power (up to 150 PS (110 kW; 148 hp) at 6000 rpm and 180 N⋅m (133 lb⋅ft) of torque at 3500 rpm). MIVEC variable valve timing was also used to increase the output, upping the power dramatically from the naturally aspirated 4G15 version, which only producing 98 PS (72 kW; 97 hp) and 132 N⋅m (97 lb⋅ft) of torque. This engine later made its way to the Z30 series in January 2005 under the CZT badge, as part of the newly introduced three-door model.

The Z20 series received two further facelifts in November 2006 and October 2008. The Z30 series Colt built in the Netherlands also received a facelift in October 2008, unveiled at the Paris Auto Show. The facelifted Z30 series Colt was designed by Omer Halilhodžić, with exterior styling aligned to the 2007 Lancer, which he also designed. It also featured revised interiors (including a new stereo, air conditioning dials, instrument cluster and various other parts). However, the 1.5-litre turbodiesel was removed from the range, with lack of demand cited.

The production of the Colts ended in 2013, replaced by the 2012 Mirage/Space Star.

Z20

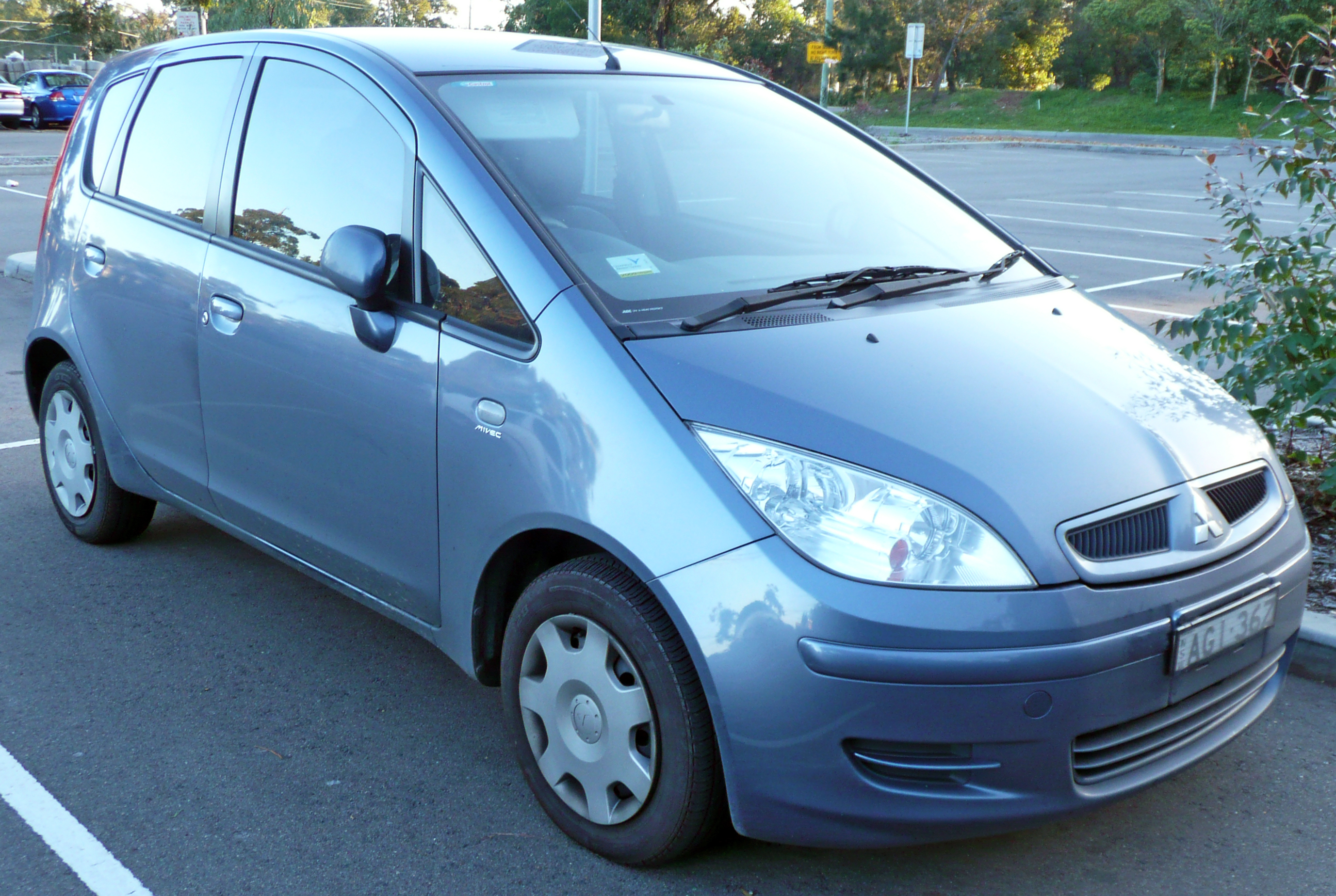
2002–2004 Mitsubishi Colt 5-door (standard)

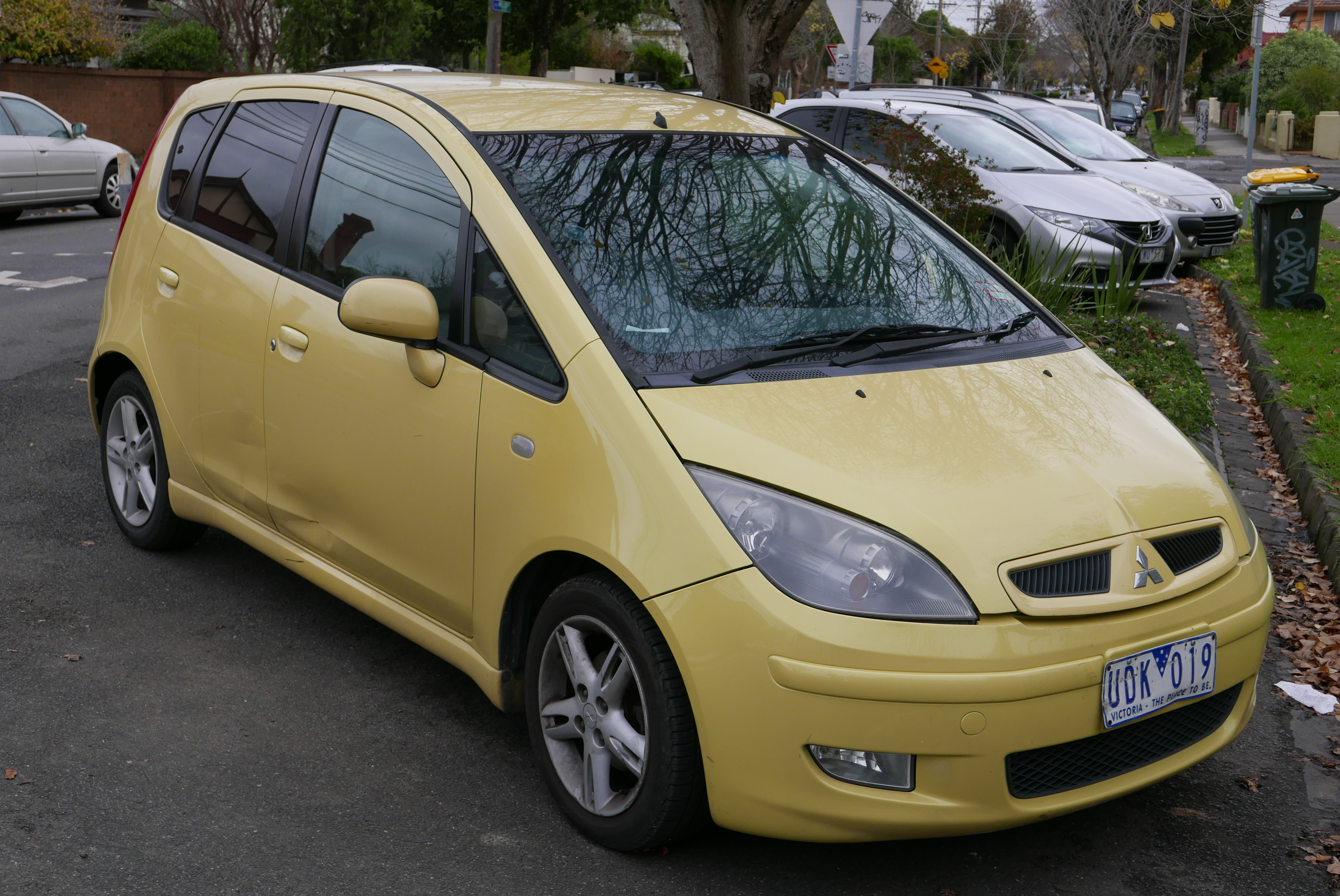
2002–2004 Mitsubishi Colt 5-door (sporty)

2002–2004 Mitsubishi Colt 5-door

2004–2006 Mitsubishi Colt 5-door

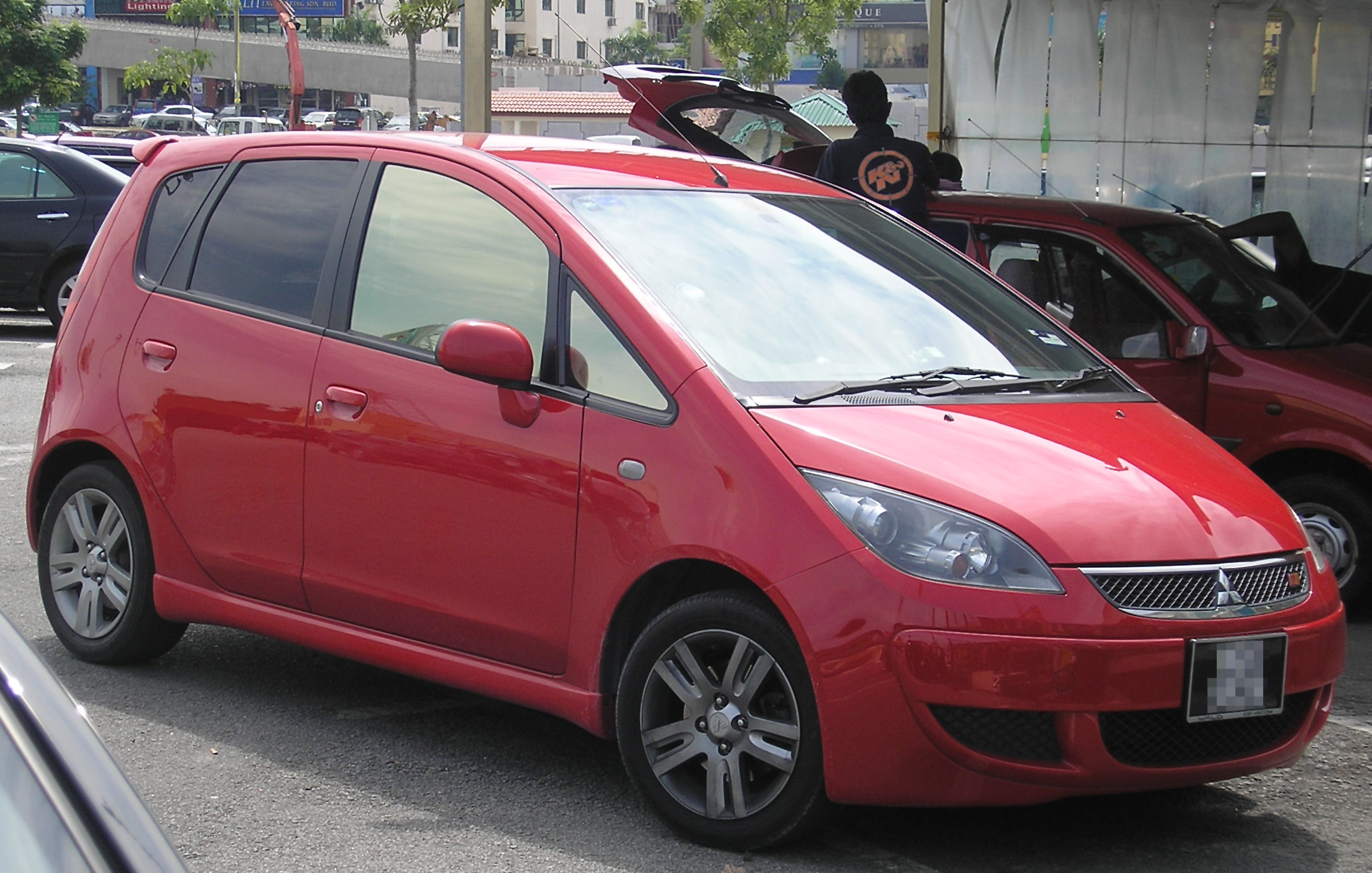
2004–2006 Mitsubishi Colt Ralliart 5-door

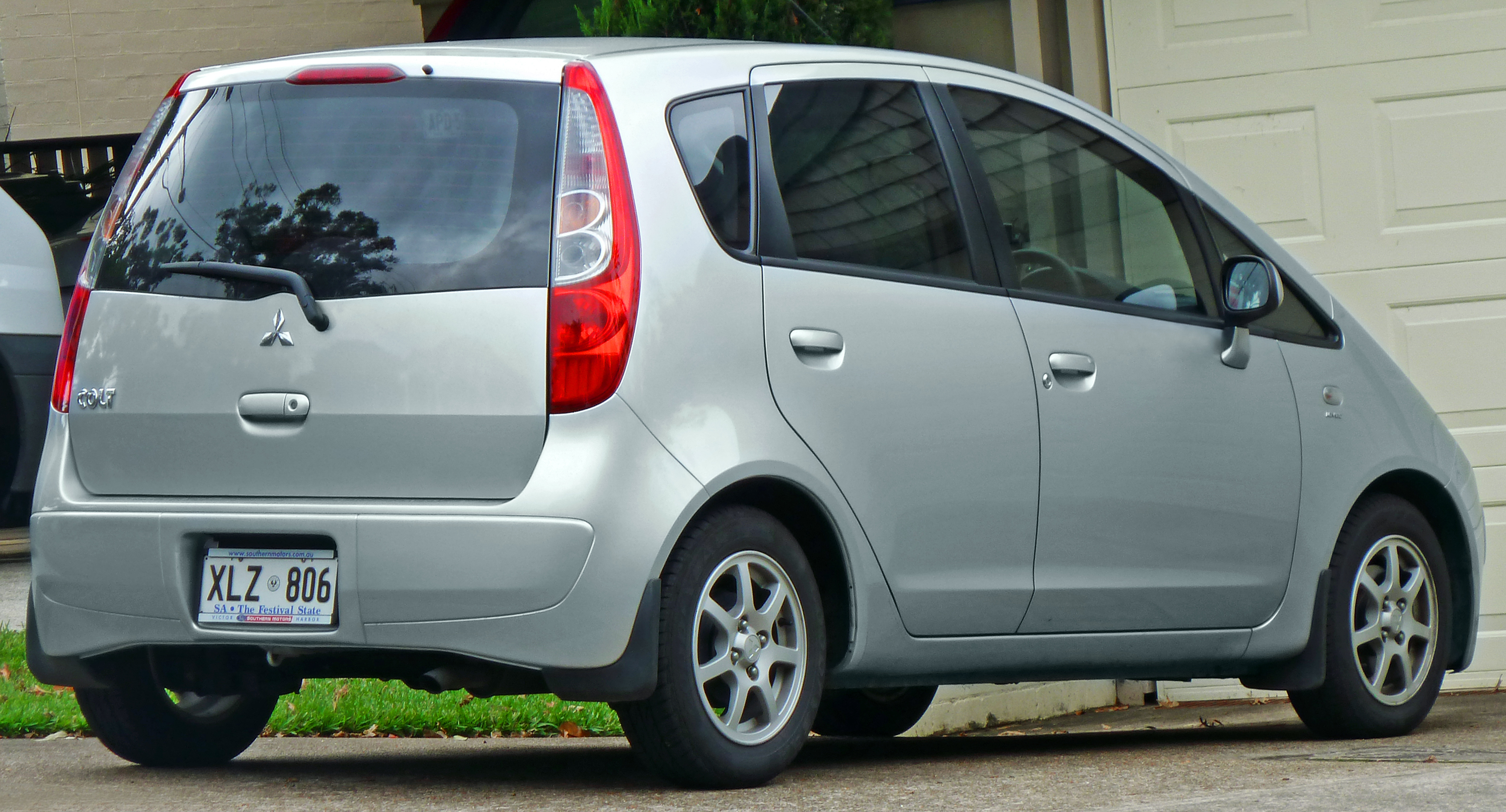
2004–2012 Mitsubishi Colt 5-door

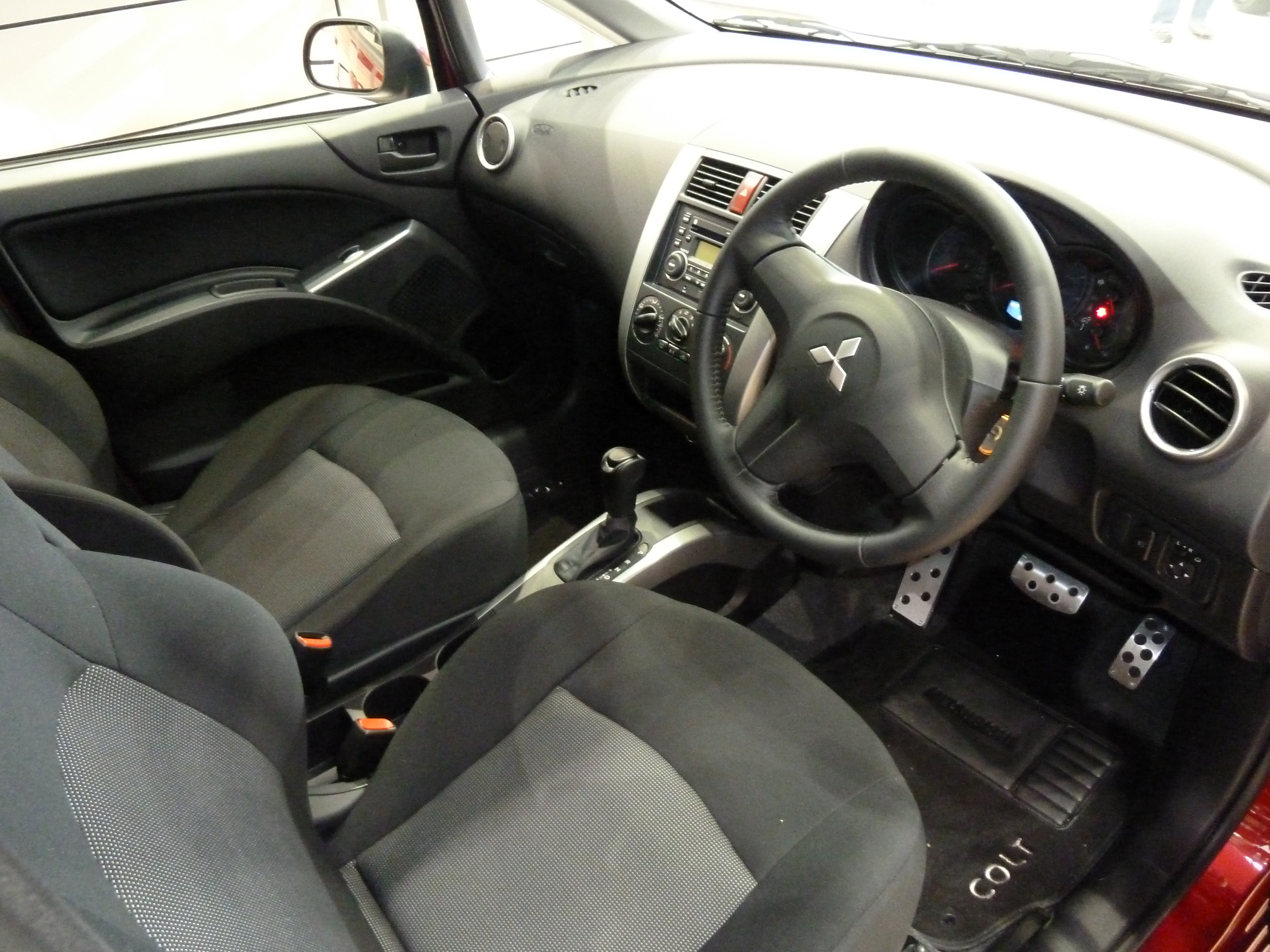
Interior

Z30

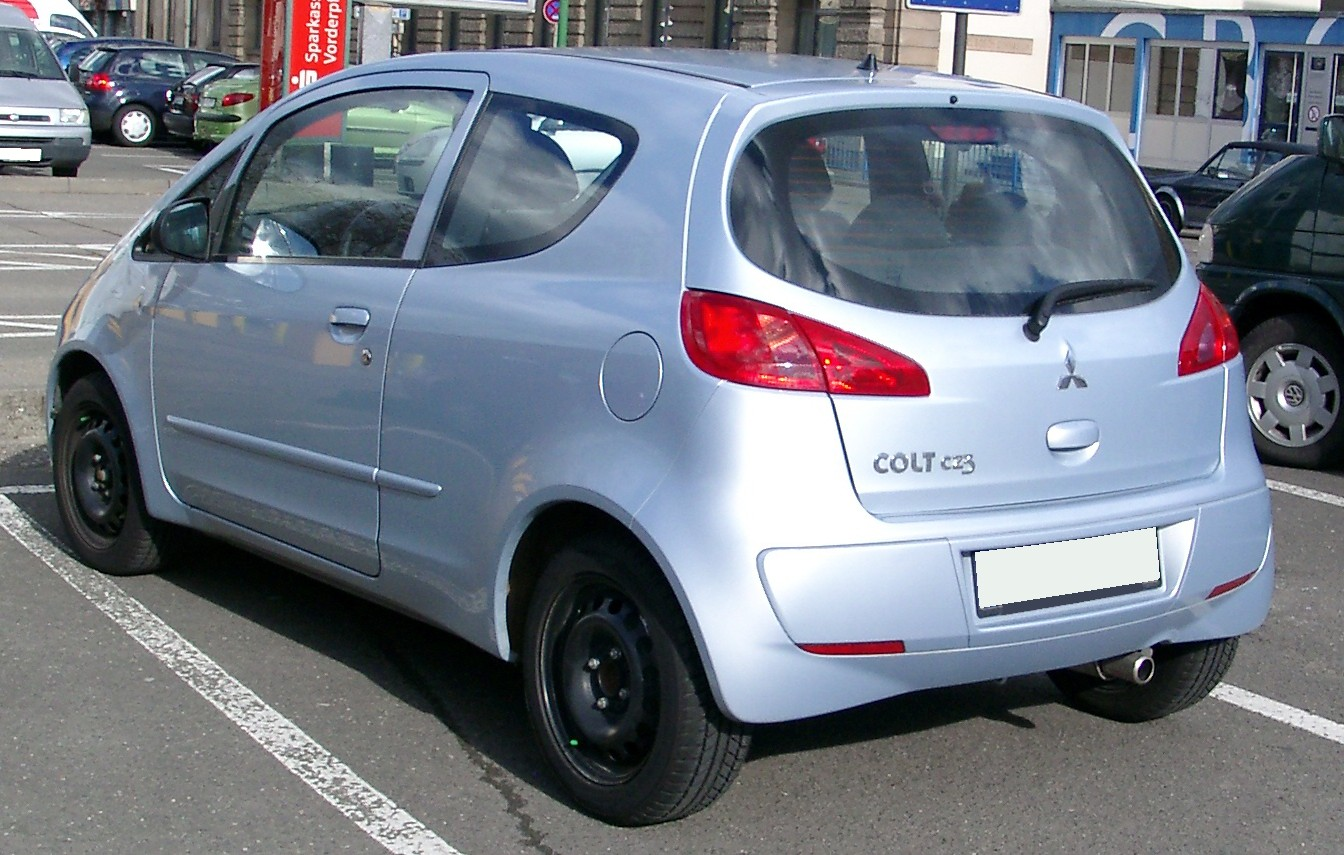
2004–2008 Mitsubishi Colt 3-door

2005–2008 Mitsubishi Colt CZT 3-door (Z30)

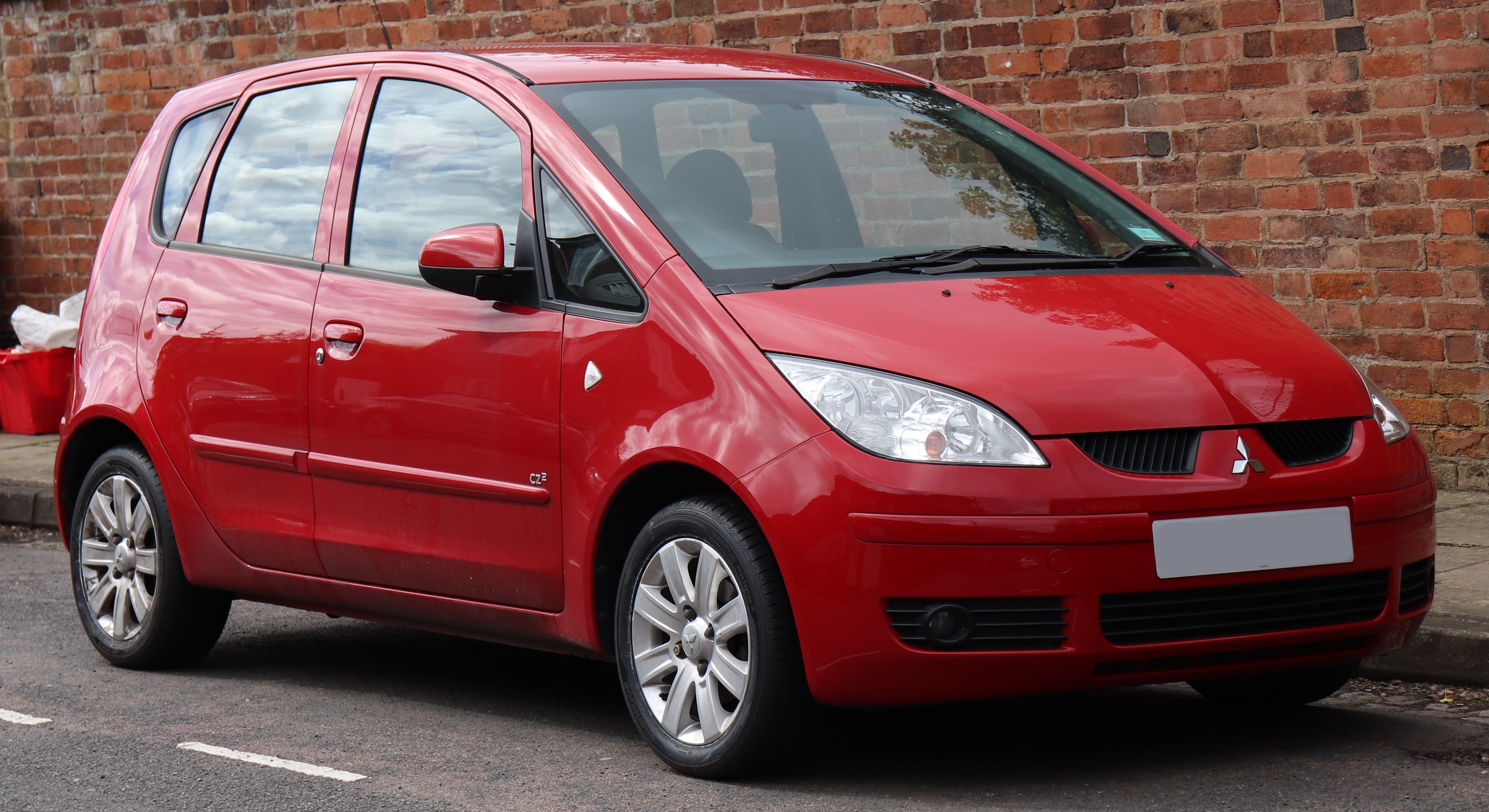
2004–2008 Mitsubishi Colt 5-door

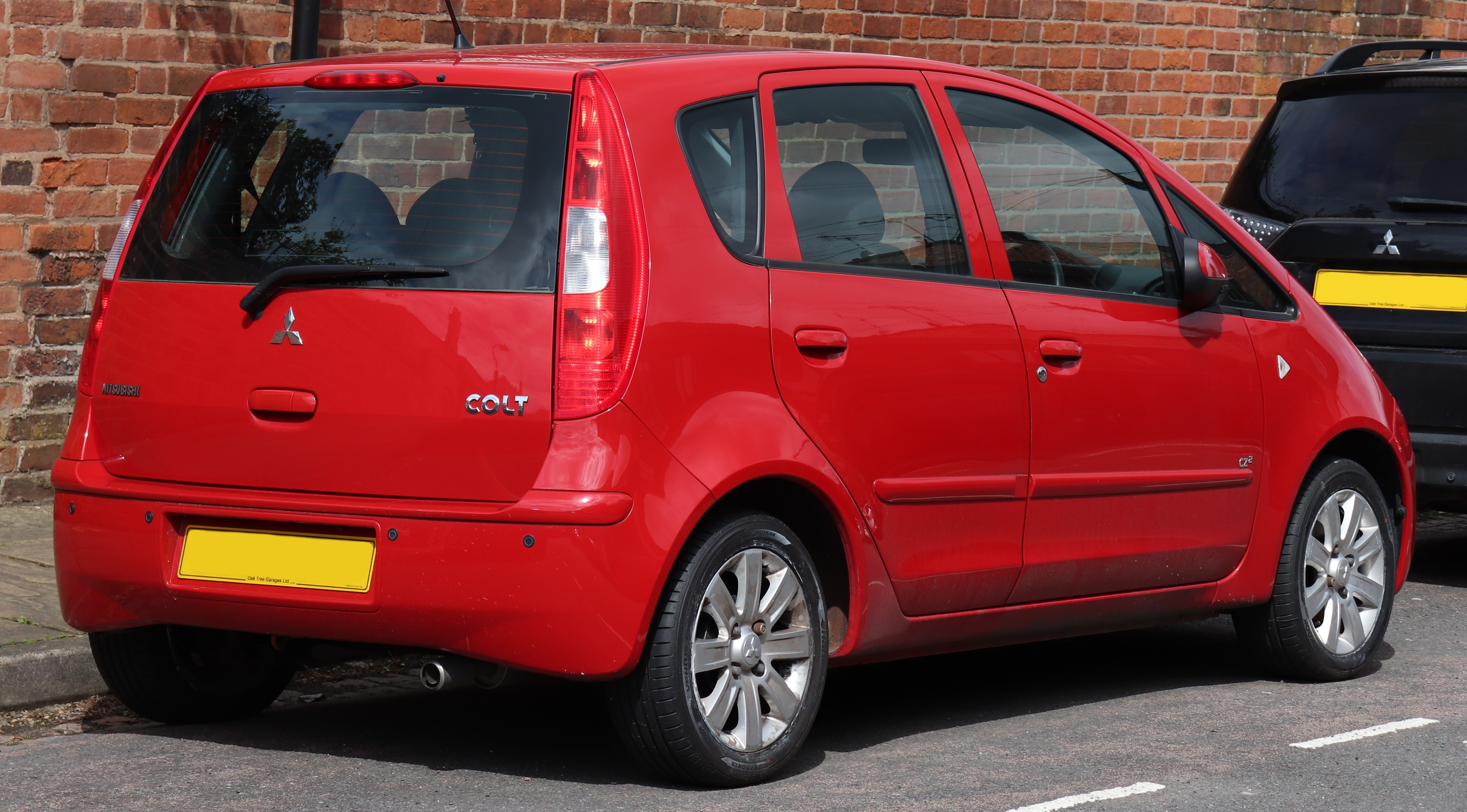
2004–2008 Mitsubishi Colt 5-door

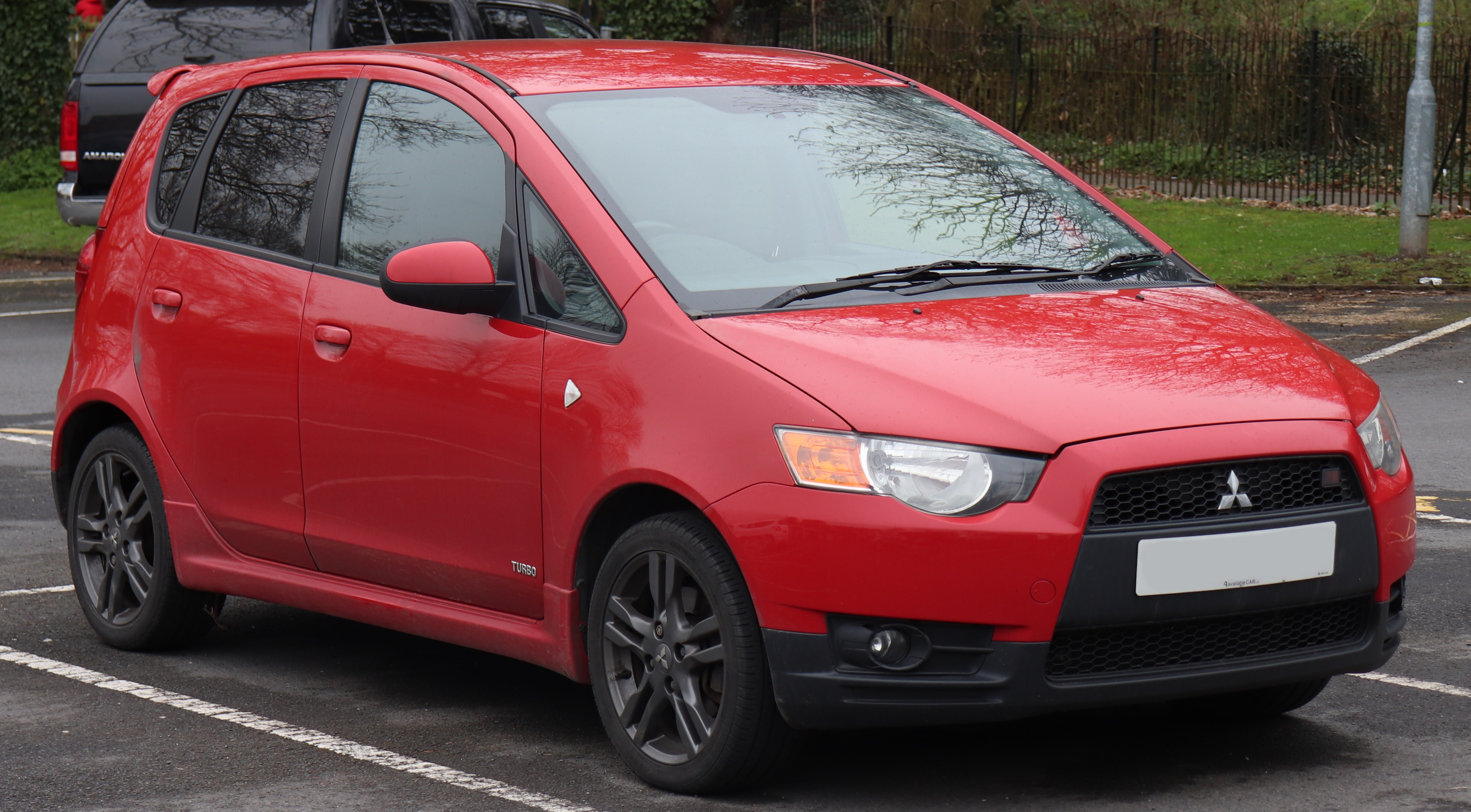
2008–2012 Mitsubishi Colt Ralliart 5-door

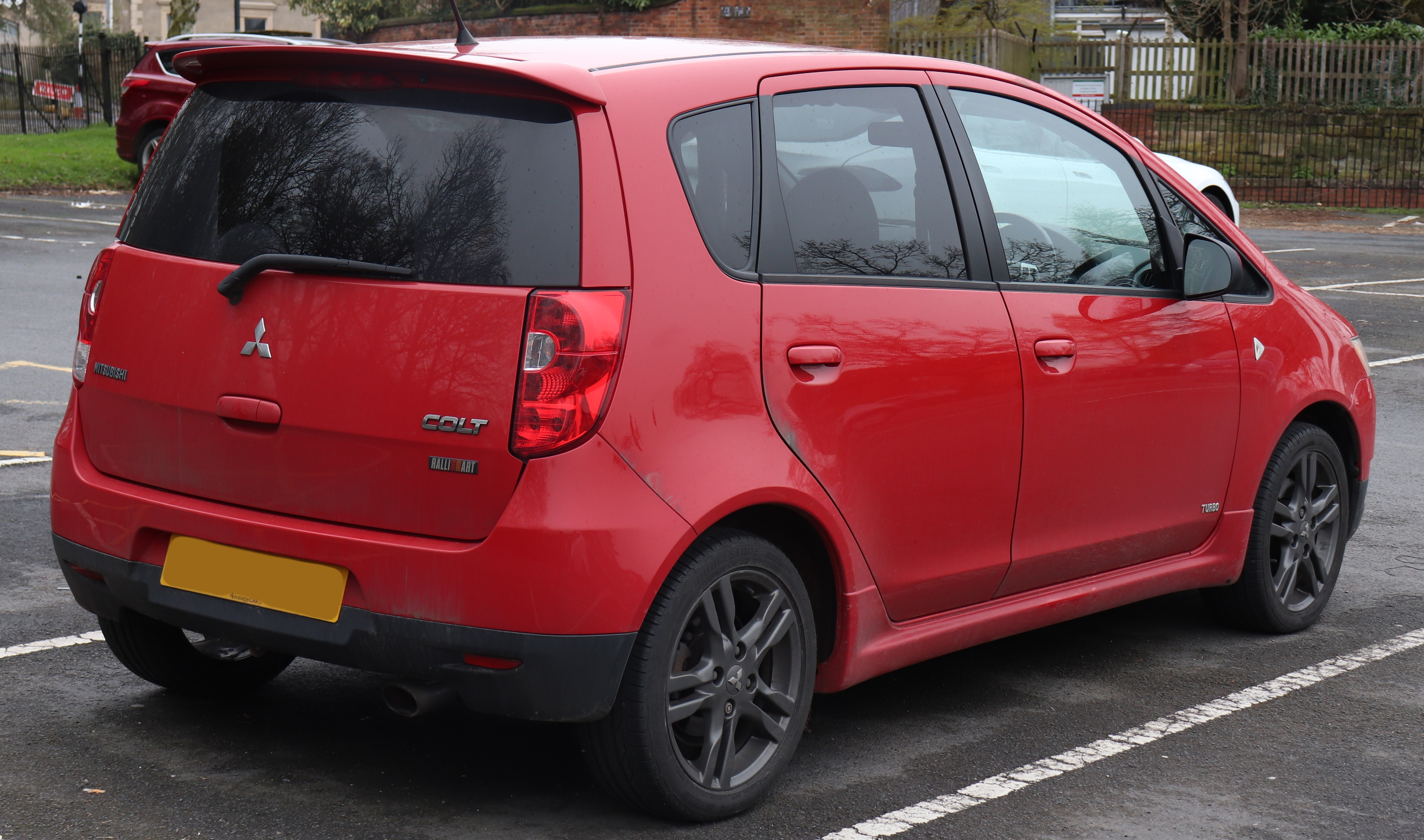
2008–2012 Mitsubishi Colt Ralliart 5-door

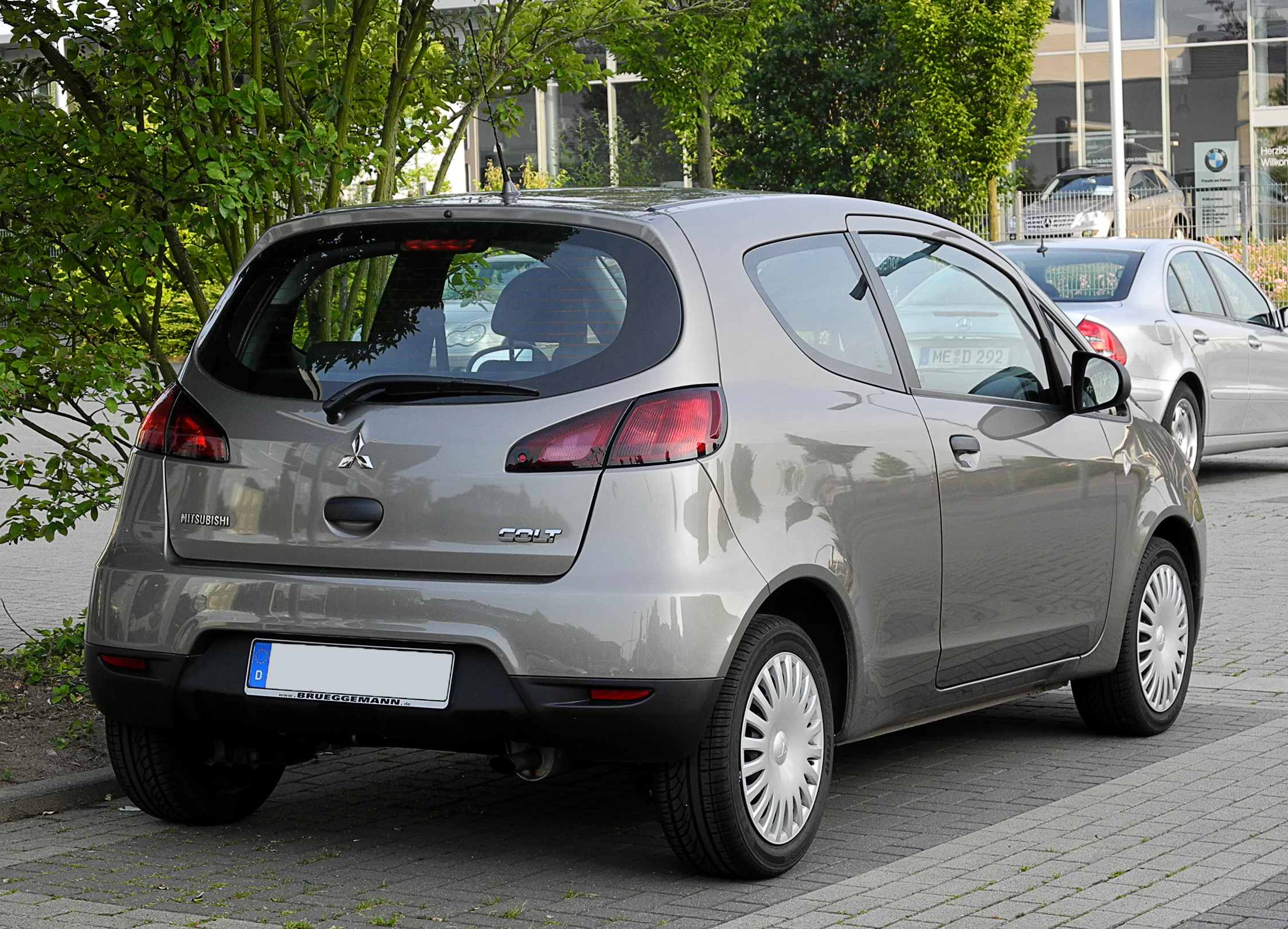
2008–2012 Mitsubishi Colt 3-door

=== Colt CZC ===
Mitsubishi released a coupé cabriolet version called the Colt CZC at the Geneva Motor Show in March 2005, and the car has been on sale since early 2006. The car is a 2+2 with a retractable hard-top. The Colt CZC was only powered by 1.5-litre naturally aspirated and turbocharged petrol engines, and mated exclusively with a five-speed manual transmission. The car was jointly developed by Mitsubishi and Pininfarina under Ken Okuyama, it was partially made in the Netherlands, with final assembly taking part at Pininfarina in Turin, Italy.

The Colt CZC was also exported outside Europe, including to Australia. Production was halted in the second half of 2008, although sales continued as late as August 2009.

Only 16,695 units of the Colt CZC were built. Pininfarina was ordered to pay €20.5 million as the consenquently of the six month delayed in 2008. While Mitsubishi paid Pininfarina a net amount of €17.4 million plus interest, totaling €19.2 million in 2010.

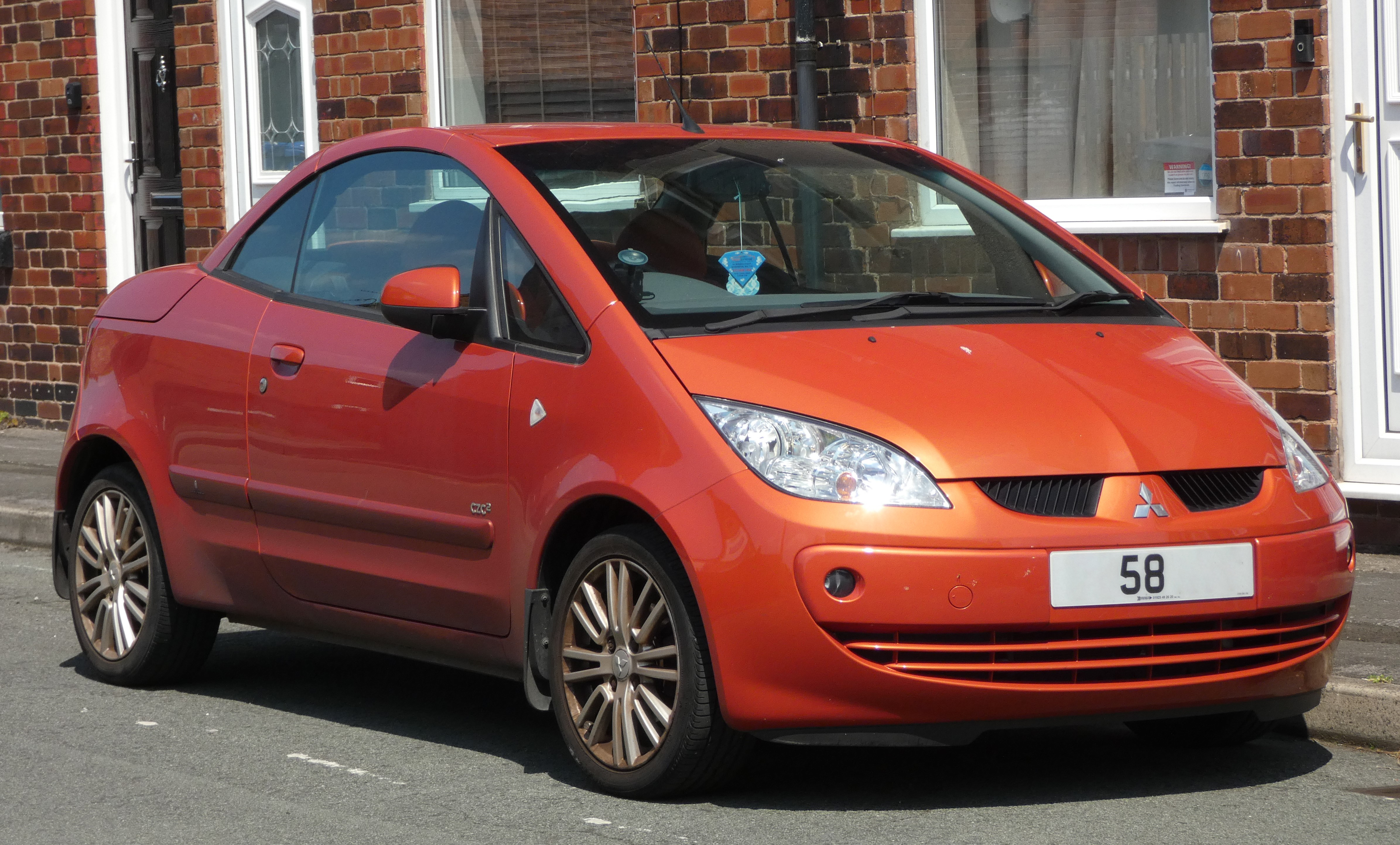
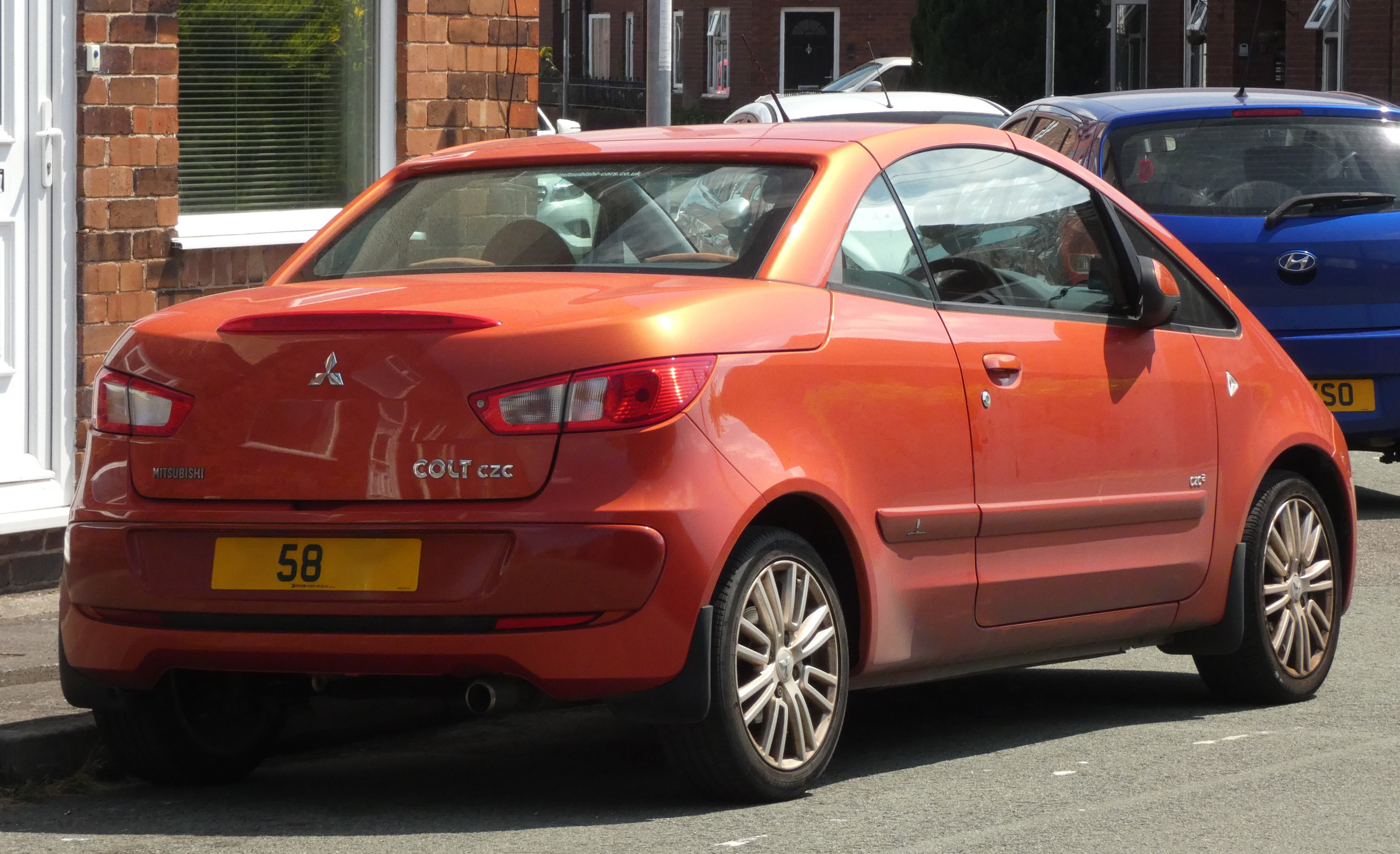
2006–2009 Mitsubishi Colt CZC

=== Colt Ralliart Version-R ===
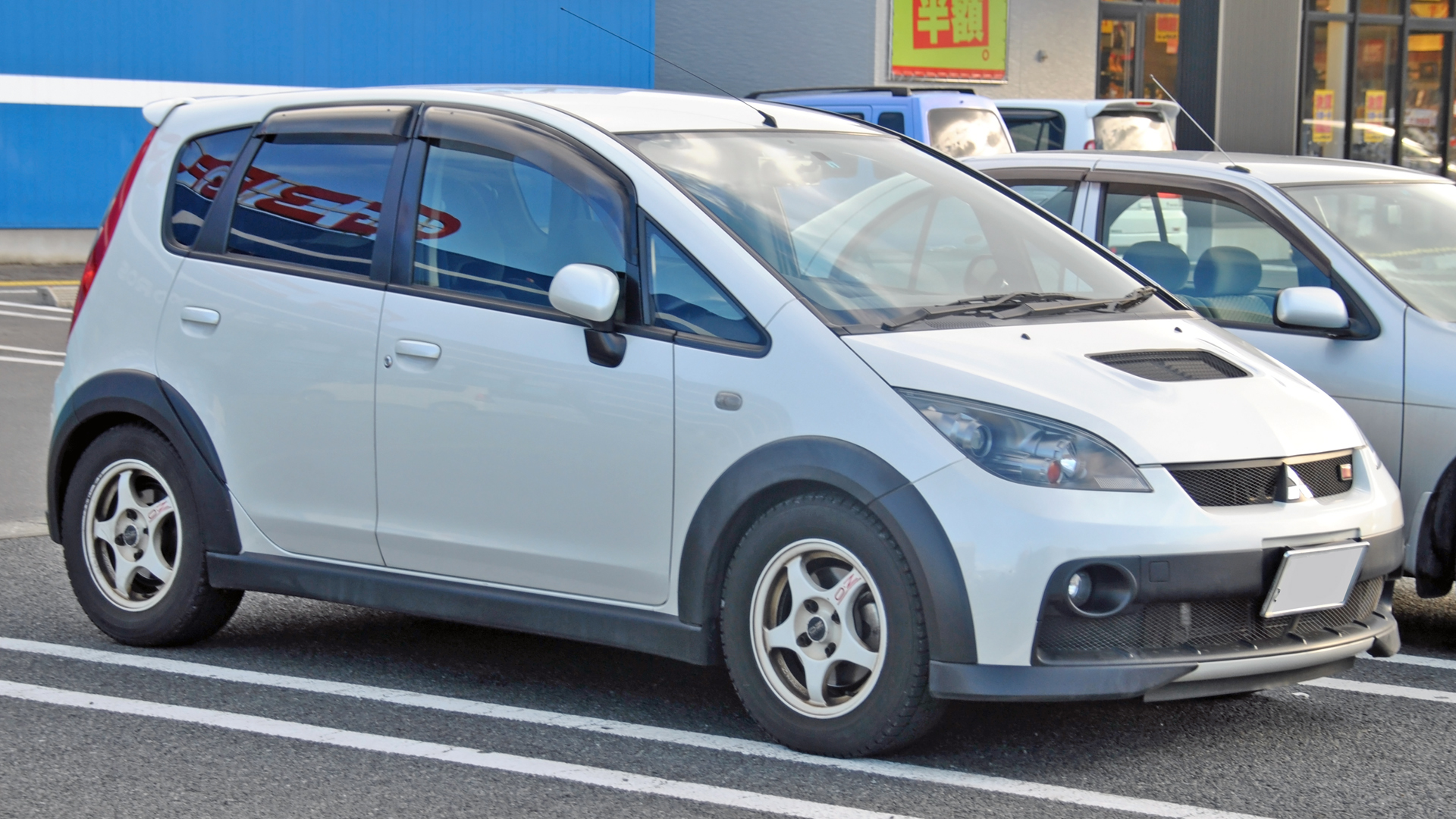

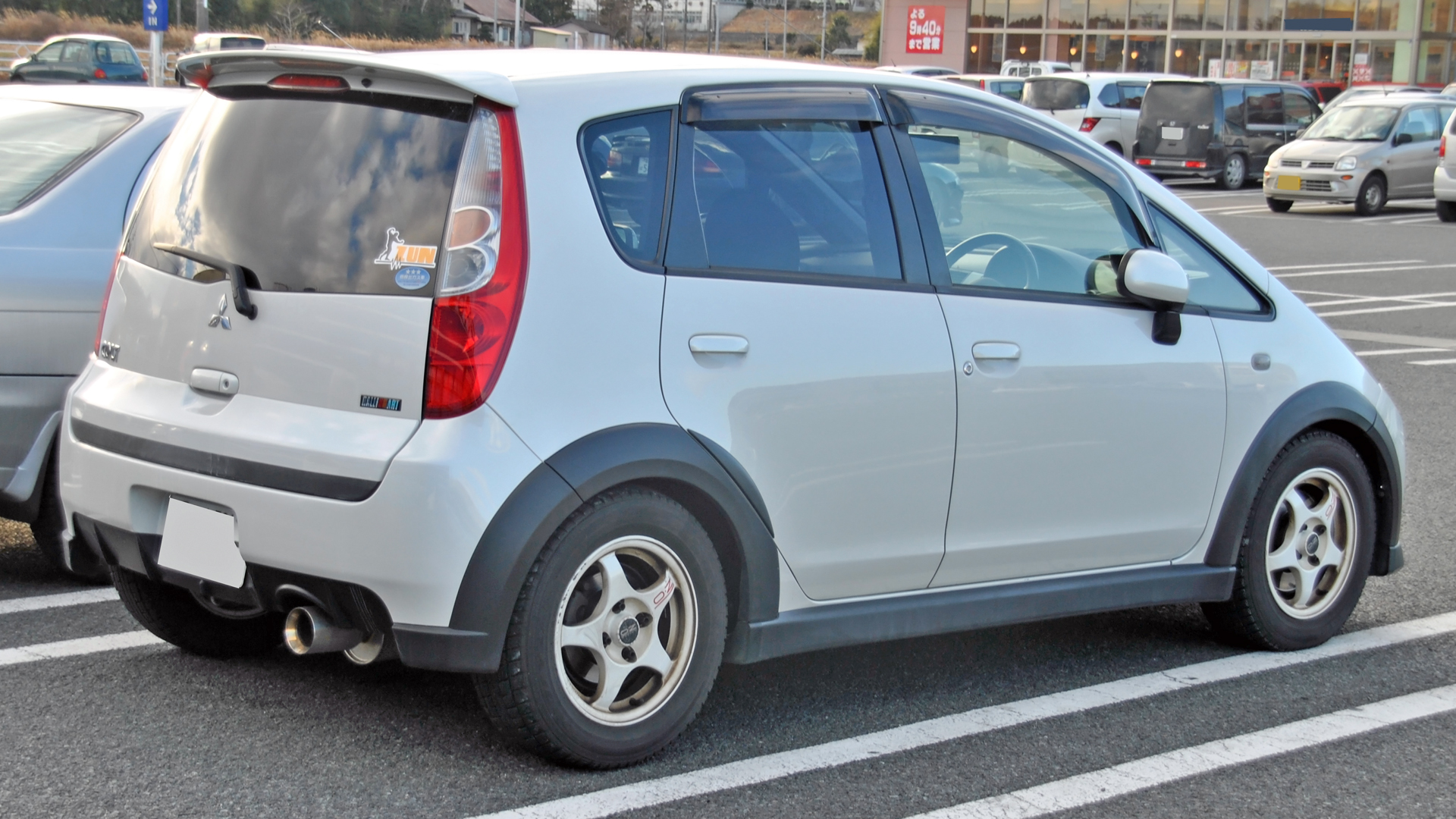
Mitsubishi Colt Ralliart Version-R

Mitsubishi released the Colt Ralliart Version-R in Japan on 30 May 2006. Its 4G15 engine, with MIVEC variable valve timing and turbocharger, produces 154 PS (113 kW; 152 hp) at 6000 rpm and 210 N⋅m (155 lb⋅ft) at 3500 rpm for the manual model, with torque reduced to 180 N⋅m (133 lb⋅ft) at 2500 rpm for the CVT model. Other key features include a stiffer spot welded chassis, stiffer suspensions, improved exhaust system, improved steering mounting, body kit, 240 km/h speedometer, low profile high-grip 16-inch tires (205/45R16), and Recaro bucket seats borrowed from the Lancer Evolution VIII MR.

The rear seats are moulded for two passengers, as opposed to three in the rest of the range. Incidentally, this is the same engine used in the 2004 European performance specification Colt (CZ-T), only running slightly increased horsepower figures (torque stayed the same). This version is also sold in Australia and New Zealand as the Colt Ralliart, without the 'Version-R' designation. The CVT version is officially sold in Singapore and Hong Kong under the same designation as Japan.

In November 2007, the Japanese market Colt Version-R received a minor facelift with its engine uprated to 163 PS (120 kW; 161 hp) at 6000 rpm and 210 N⋅m (155 lb⋅ft) at 3500 rpm for the manual transmission model. The 16-inch wheels were also changed and the Recaro bucket seats from the same seat as the Lancer Evolution X was available as an option. The CVT model's output remained as before.

In Australia and New Zealand the 2008 and onwards models were fitted with lighter rims and chrome headlamps, but the sunglass holder and front Recaro seats were removed and replaced with standard sports seats to reflect a reduced retail price.

In August 2008, a limited version called Colt Ralliart Version-R Special was launched in the Japanese market for a limited number of 300 units and manual transmission only. The difference from the regular version is further stiffer continuous seam-welded chassis, standard Recaro bucket seats, and a Ralliart muffler. Another 200 units of Version-R Special were launched in 2010.

=== Colt Plus ===
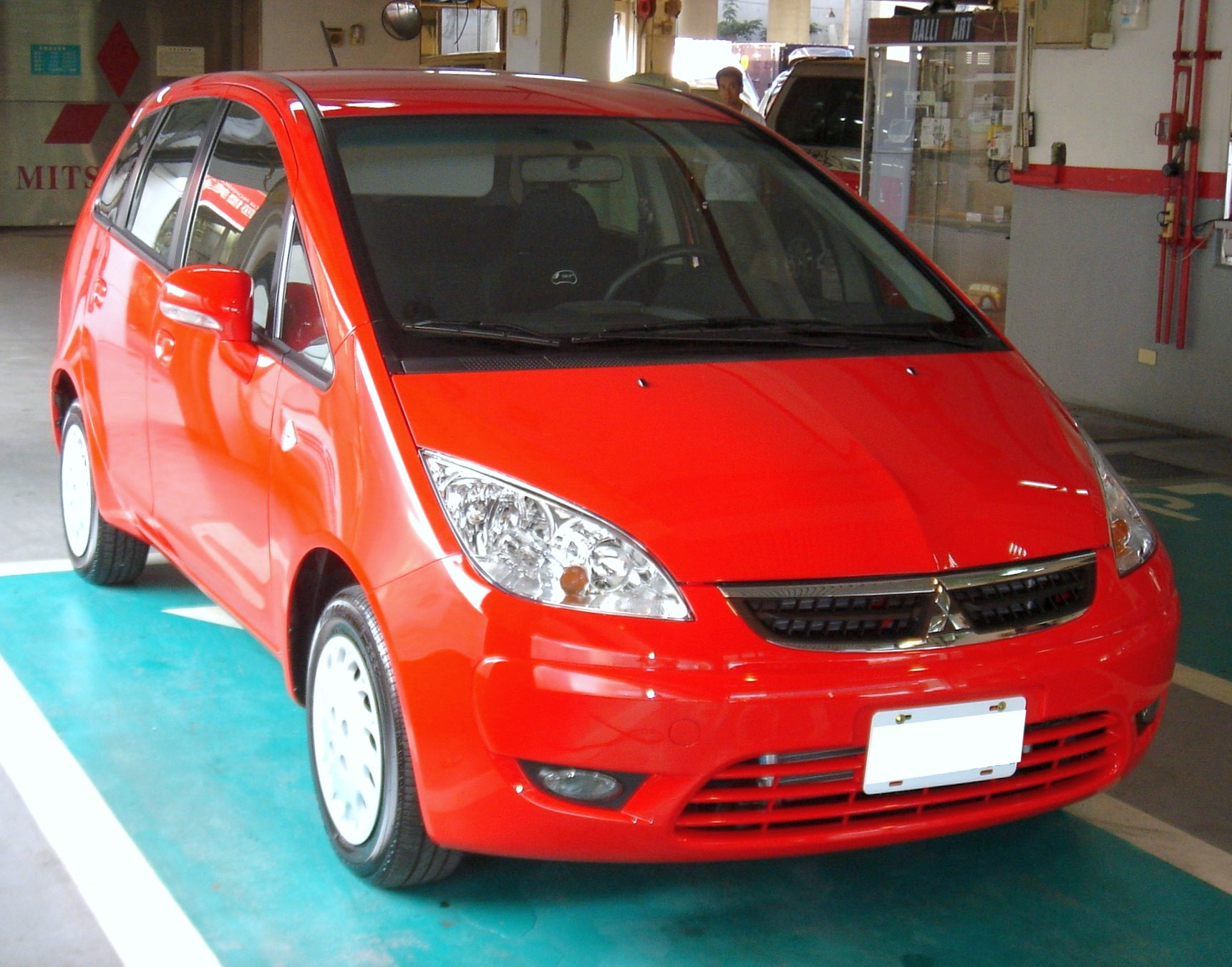

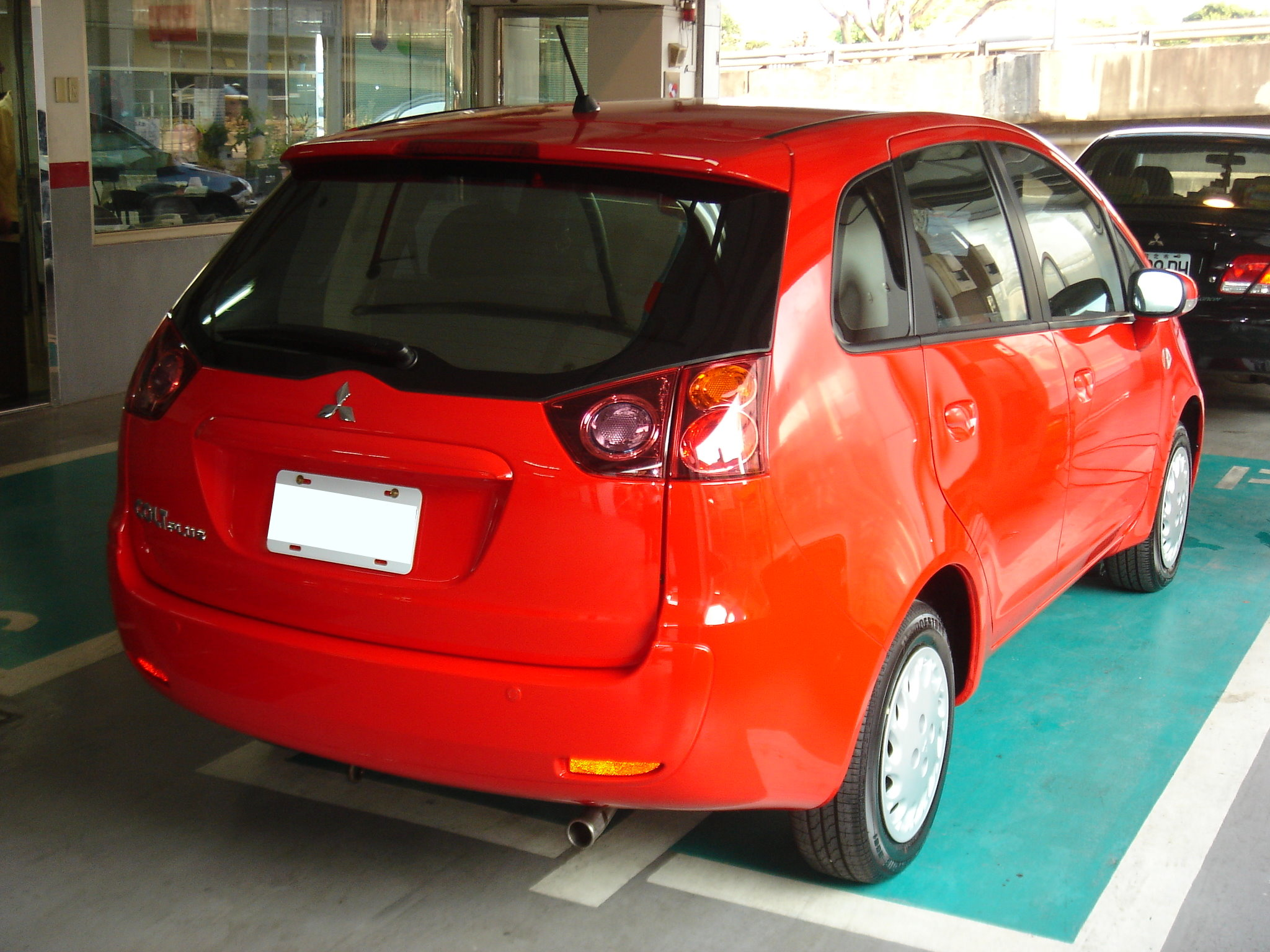
2004–2008 Mitsubishi Colt Plus

2008–2012 Mitsubishi Colt Plus

A longer version of the Colt called the Colt Plus was launched on 25 October 2004, and was later exported to the same regions as the Z20 hatchback in the selected market. This was essentially a station wagon version of the standard Colt with around 300 mm (11.8 in) slightly bigger space compared to the regular Colt. The Colt Plus features an automatic tailgate with an obstacle sensor, which can be operated via the key remote. It is powered by 1.5-litre naturally aspirated 4A91 and turbocharged 4G15 engines, mated exclusively to a INVECS-III CVT with a simulated six-speed mode. The Japanese market Colt Plus was discontinued in August 2012, but the regular Colt was continued production until early 2013.

The Colt Plus Turbo has the same feature as the Colt Plus except for the difference in engine and transmission. They use the same 4G15 engine as the 2004 European CZT with an output of 143 bhp but with 180 nm of torque. The Colt Plus Turbo also uses the Invecs III with a 6-speed sport shift.

The Colt Plus Ralliart is basically a 2006 facelifted version of the Colt Plus Turbo. The 4G15 engine power has been uprated to 154 bhp (115 kW) to match the Colt Version R. The styling of the Colt Plus Ralliart also matches the Colt Version R with the same EVO-inspired bonnet vents and bumpers. It is also accompanied with leather seats.

==== Taiwanese market Colt Plus ====
In March 2007, Mitsubishi launched Colt Plus in Taiwan, which is similar to the version launched in Japan in 2004 but the engine is different. It's powered by a 1.6-litre SOHC 4G18 engine and it's the same engine used in the 2000 Taiwanese Lancer, running slightly increased horsepower figures (112 hp (84 kW) at 6,000 rpm / 14.9 kg-m at 4,500 rpm) and it uses the INVECS-III CVT transmission in fully-automatic mode. The Taiwanese model later received a facelift changing most of its body panels, while the Colts in other markets are replaced by the Mirage.

A new Colt Plus X-Sports was released in 2014, features the crossover-style design such as exterior plastic cladding. In 2008 it added a sporty version for the Taiwan market called "Colt Plus iO" which used the INVECS-III with 6-speed shift and changed the facelift to fit the styling in Japanese market.

In 2013, China Motor Corporation (CMC), as the dealer of Mitsubishi cars of Taiwan conducted a major facelift on the Colt Plus. This is the second facelift of the current generation Colt Plus, and also the biggest facelift, with every single body panel redesigned and upgrading the wheels from 4 bolt wheels to 5 bolt wheels. The facelifted Colt Plus remains on sale in Taiwan alongside other long-serving Mitsubishi models like the Grand Lancer (Lancer EX), an updated version as the next generation of the 2007 international model and an updated version of the third generation Delica.

In June 2017, CMC launched the third facelift for the Colt Plus, which included the "Dynamic Shield" which was adopted on various Mitsubishi product range at the time, including the Outlander, Eclipse Cross, and Grand Lancer.

2009–2013 Mitsubishi Colt Plus
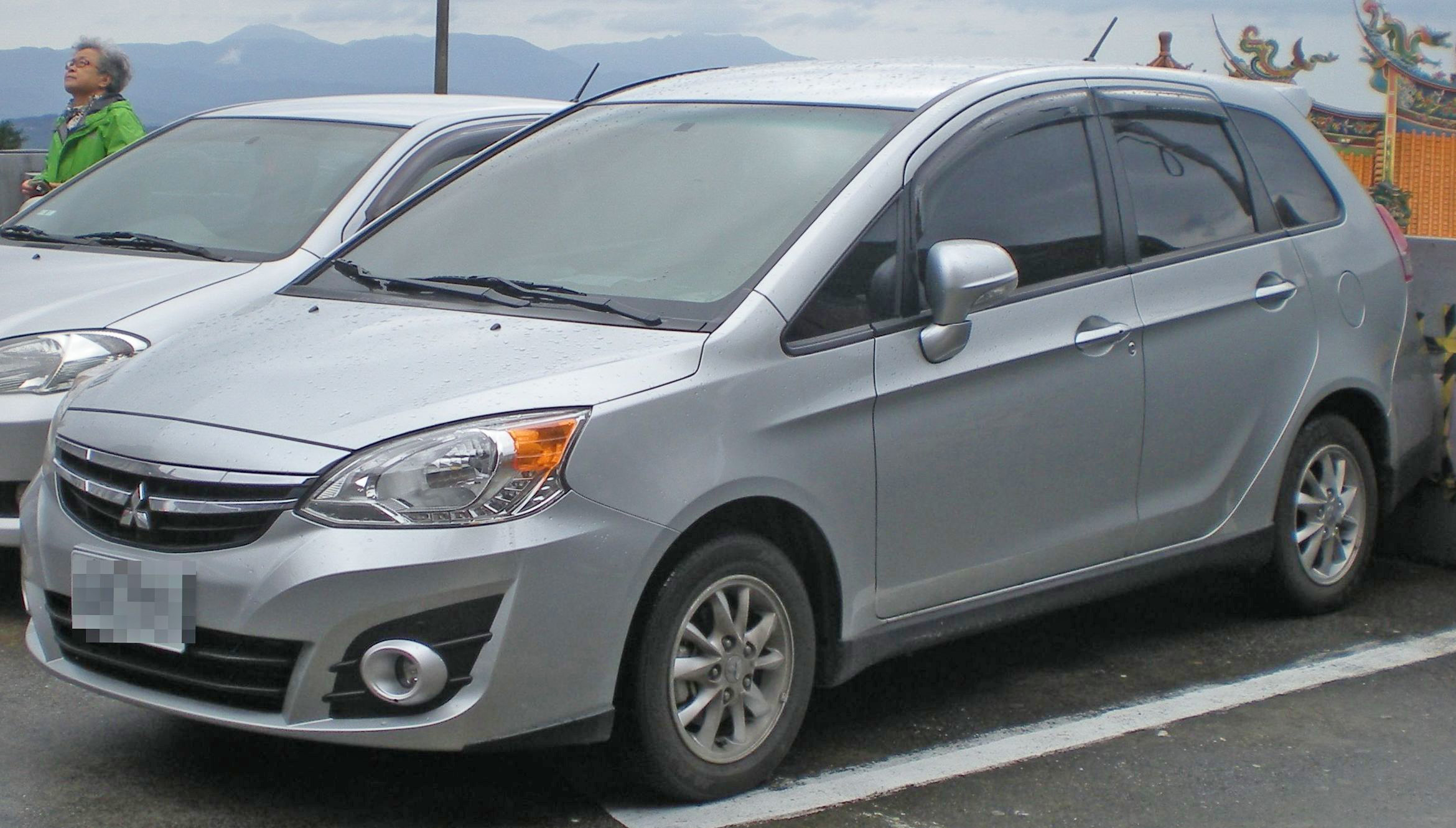
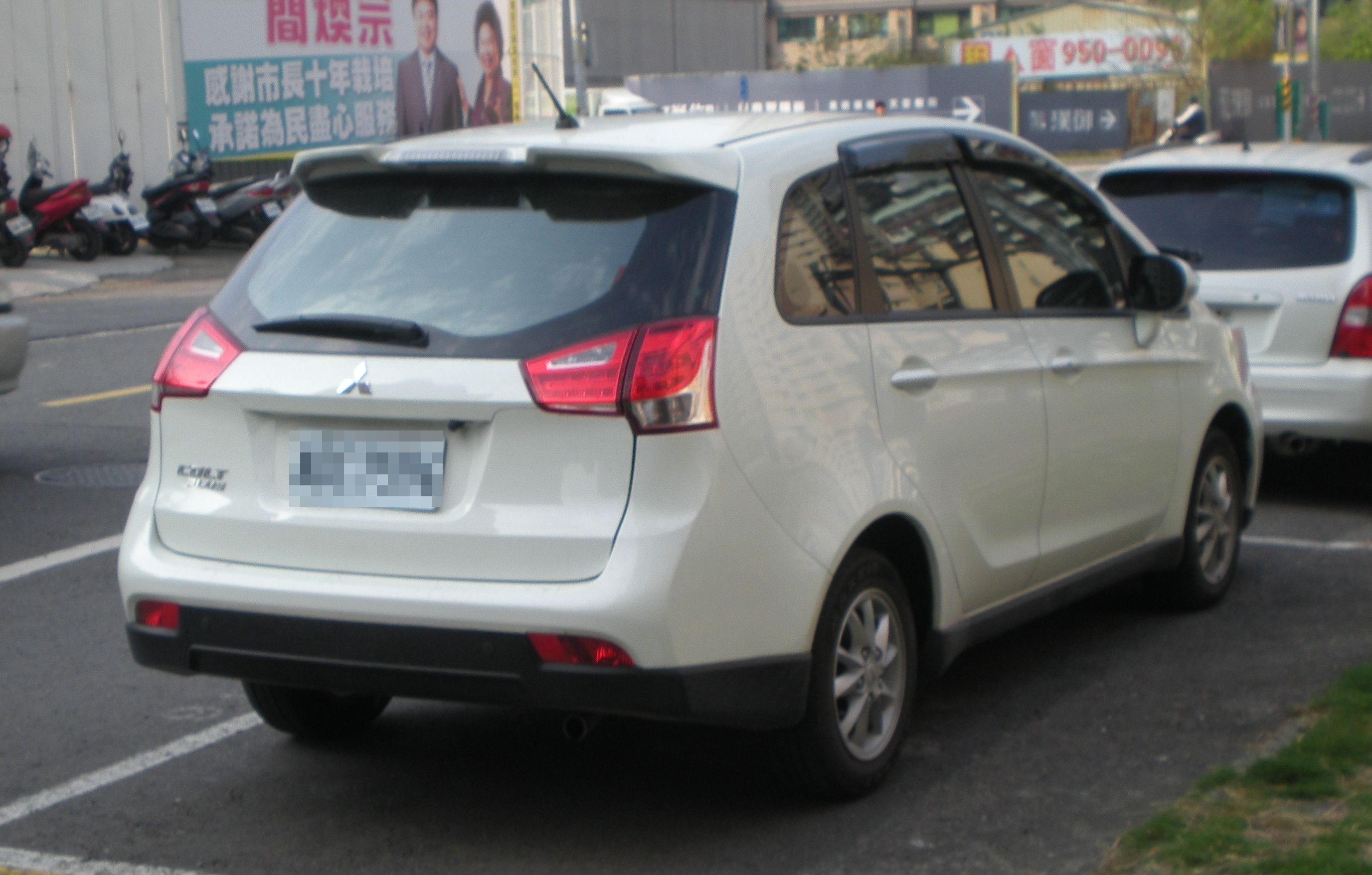
2013–2016 Mitsubishi Colt Plus
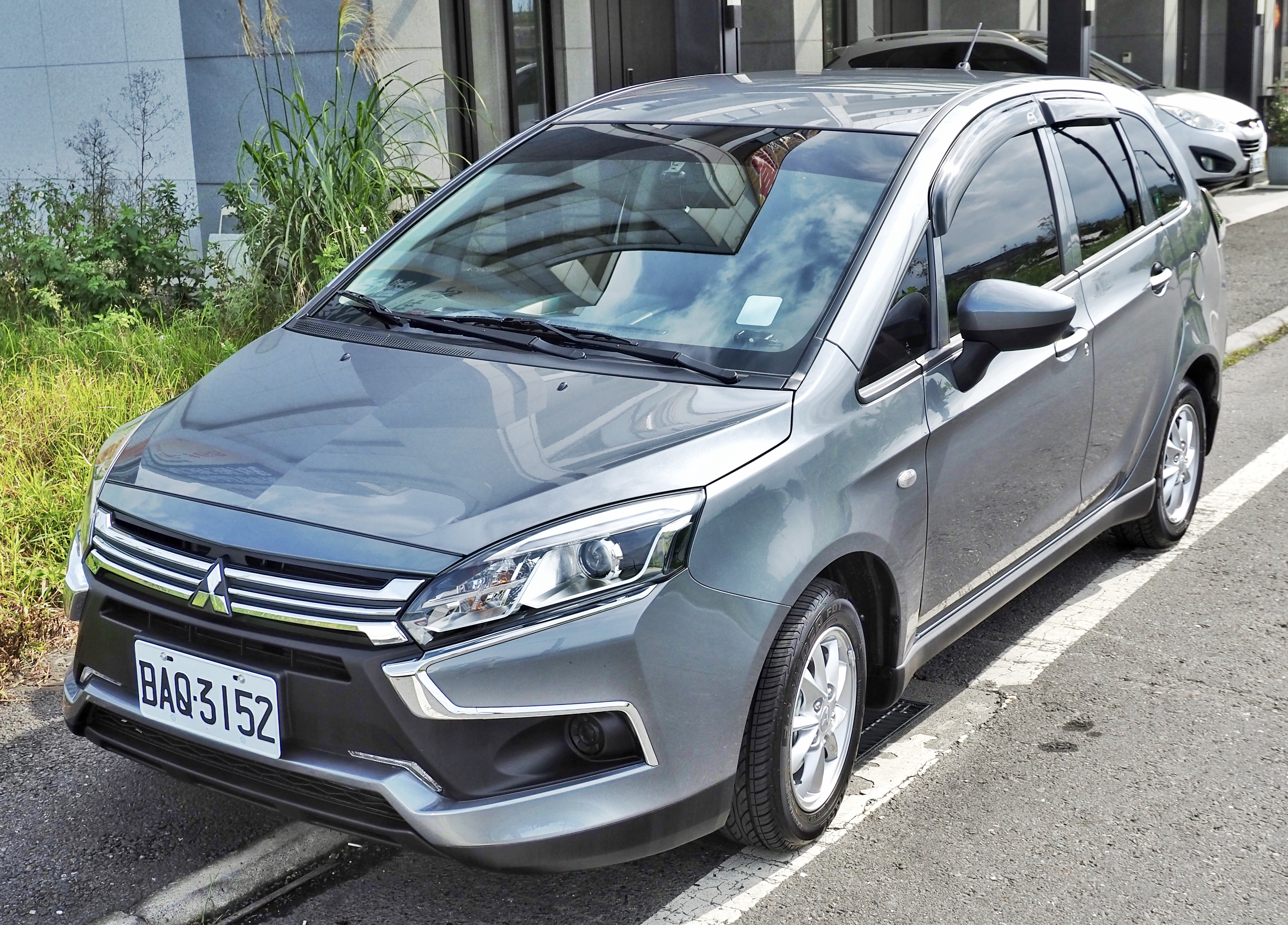
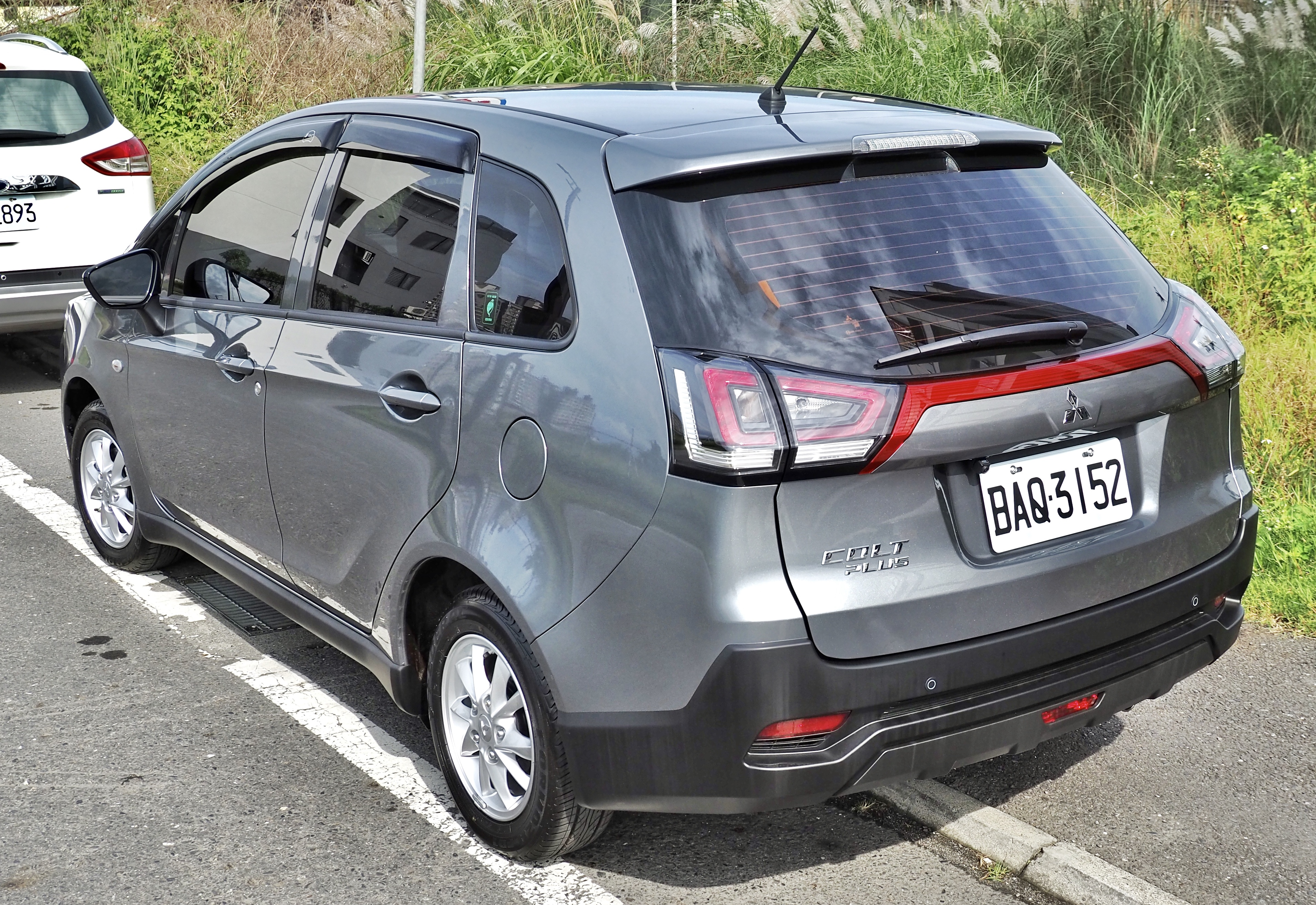
2017–present Mitsubishi Colt Plus

2010–2013 Mitsubishi Colt Plus iO

2014–2016 Mitsubishi Colt Plus X Sports

=== Colt MIEV ===
In 2006 Mitsubishi displayed the Colt MIEV, using a separate electric motor at each wheel. Development of their MIEV technology was first announced May 2006 when Mitsubishi unveiled the Colt version is a rear-wheel drive all-electric vehicle fitted Colt MIEV test-bed. With two 20 kW in-wheel motors. The Colt MIEV has a top speed of 150 km/h (93 mph) and a cruising range of 150 km (93 mi) on a single charge. Charge times have been suggested to be a quick as 10 minutes, although whether this is partial or full is undisclosed. It does however point to the usage of quick-charge batteries such as those developed by Toshiba.

Mitsubishi used the Colt test bed to perform on-road testing to identify and resolve any problems unique to the in-wheel motor vehicle, including any deterioration in road holding and ride comfort due to increases in unsprung weight, as well as reliability and durability issues in the in-wheel motor system and its peripheral components (suspension, wheels, tires). They simultaneously worked on developing a more powerful version of the in wheel motors for 4WD applications.

=== Engines (Europe) ===
| Engine | Code | Type | Displacement | Power | Torque | Top speed | 0-60 mph | Combined consumption | CO_{2} emissions | Production years |
Petrol engines
| 1.1 | 3A91 | I3 | 1,124 cc | 55 kW (75 PS; 74 hp) at 6000 rpm | 100 N⋅m (74 lb⋅ft) at 3500 rpm | 165 km/h (103 mph) | 12.5 s | 51 mpg (imperial) | 130 g/km | 2004–2013 |
| 1.3 | 4A90 | I4 | 1,332 cc | 70 kW (95 PS; 94 hp) at 5250 rpm | 125 N⋅m (92 lb⋅ft) at 4000 rpm | 180 km/h (112 mph) | 10.6 s | 47 mpg (imperial) | 143 g/km | 2004–2013 |
| 1.3 (ClearTec) | 4A90 | I4 | 1,332 cc | 70 kW (95 PS; 94 hp) at 5250 rpm | 125 N⋅m (92 lb⋅ft) at 4000 rpm | 180 km/h (112 mph) | 10.1 s | 55 mpg (imperial) | 119 g/km | 2008-2013 |
| 1.5 | 4A91 | I4 | 1,499 cc | 80 kW (109 PS; 107 hp) at 6000 rpm | 145 N⋅m (107 lb⋅ft) at 4000 rpm | 190 km/h (118 mph) | 9.5 s | 46 mpg (imperial) | 145 g/km | 2004–2013 |
| 1.5 (CZT/Ralliart) | 4G15 | I4 turbo | 1,468 cc | 110 kW (150 PS; 148 hp) at 6000 rpm | 210 N⋅m (155 lb⋅ft) at 3500 rpm | 211 km/h (131 mph) | 7.7 s | 41 mpg (imperial) | 161 g/km | 2004–2013 |
Diesel engines
| 1.5 (DI-D) | OM639 | I3 | 1,493 cc | 70 kW (95 PS; 94 hp) at 4000 rpm | 210 N⋅m (155 lb⋅ft) at 1800 rpm | 180 km/h (112 mph) | 9.6 s | 58 mpg (imperial) | 126 g/km | 2004–2008 |

==== Colt engines ====
Powertrain choices include 1.1 L engine (with 3 cylinders),1.3 L engine, INVECS-III CVT transmission, 2- or 4-wheel drive for Very (XSJH9, XSDH9), COOL Very (XSJH8, XSDH8), 1.3 RX (XSXH) models. 1.5 C (XNMH) includes 1.5 L engine, 5-speed manual transmission, 2-wheel drive.

==== Colt Plus engines ====
Powertrain choices include 1.5 L MIVEC engine, INVECS-III CVT transmission, 2- or 4-wheel drive for Very (LSUH1), COOL Very (LSUH2), 1.3 RX (LTPH, LSPH) models. 1.5 RX also includes 6-speed sport mode settings for the CVT transmission.

Colt Engines (JDM)
| Models | Engine codes | Net power, and torque | Drive |
|---|---|---|---|
| Colt (DBA-Z21A) 1.3 RX | 4A90 MIVEC | 92 PS (68 kW; 91 hp) at 6000 rpm, 124 N⋅m (91 lb⋅ft) at 4000 rpm | 2WD |
| Colt (DBA-Z22A) 1.3 RX | 4A90 MIVEC | 91 PS (67 kW; 90 hp) at 6000 rpm, 122 N⋅m (90 lb⋅ft) at 4000 rpm | 4WD |
| Colt (ABA-Z23A) 1.5C | 4A91 MIVEC | 105 PS (77 kW; 104 hp) at 6000 rpm, 141 N⋅m (104 lb⋅ft) at 4000 rpm | 2WD |
| Colt (DBA-Z23W) 1.5 RX | 4A91 MIVEC | 105 PS (77 kW; 104 hp) at 6000 rpm, 141 N⋅m (104 lb⋅ft) at 4000 rpm | 2WD |
| Colt (DBA-Z24W) 1.5 RX | 4A91 MIVEC | 102 PS (75 kW; 101 hp) at 6000 rpm, 138 N⋅m (102 lb⋅ft) at 4000 rpm | 4WD |
| Colt (CBA-Z27AG) Ralliart Version-R | 4G15 MIVEC | 163 PS (120 kW; 161 hp) at 6000 rpm, 211 N⋅m (156 lb⋅ft) at 3500 rpm | 2WD |
| Colt (CMN-Z37A) CZT Ralliart | 4G15 MIVEC | 180 PS (132 kW; 178 hp) at 6000 rpm, 245 N⋅m (181 lb⋅ft) at 3500 rpm | 2WD |

=== Safety ===
ANCAP test results* Mitsubishi Colt variant(s) as tested (2007)
| Test | Score |
|---|---|
| Overall | 3 /5 stars |
| Frontal offset | 11.87/16 |
| Side impact | 11.89/16 |
| Pole | Not Assessed |
| Seat belt reminders | 0/3 |
| Whiplash protection | Not Assessed |
| Pedestrian protection | Poor |
| Electronic stability control | Not Available |

== Renault Clio-based Colt (2023–2025) ==
The Colt nameplate was revived in 2023 as a rebadged fifth-generation Renault Clio. It was discontinued at the end of 2025, following the end of the production of the fifth-generation Renault Clio by Oyak-Renault, which was also manufacturing the Mitsubishi Colt.

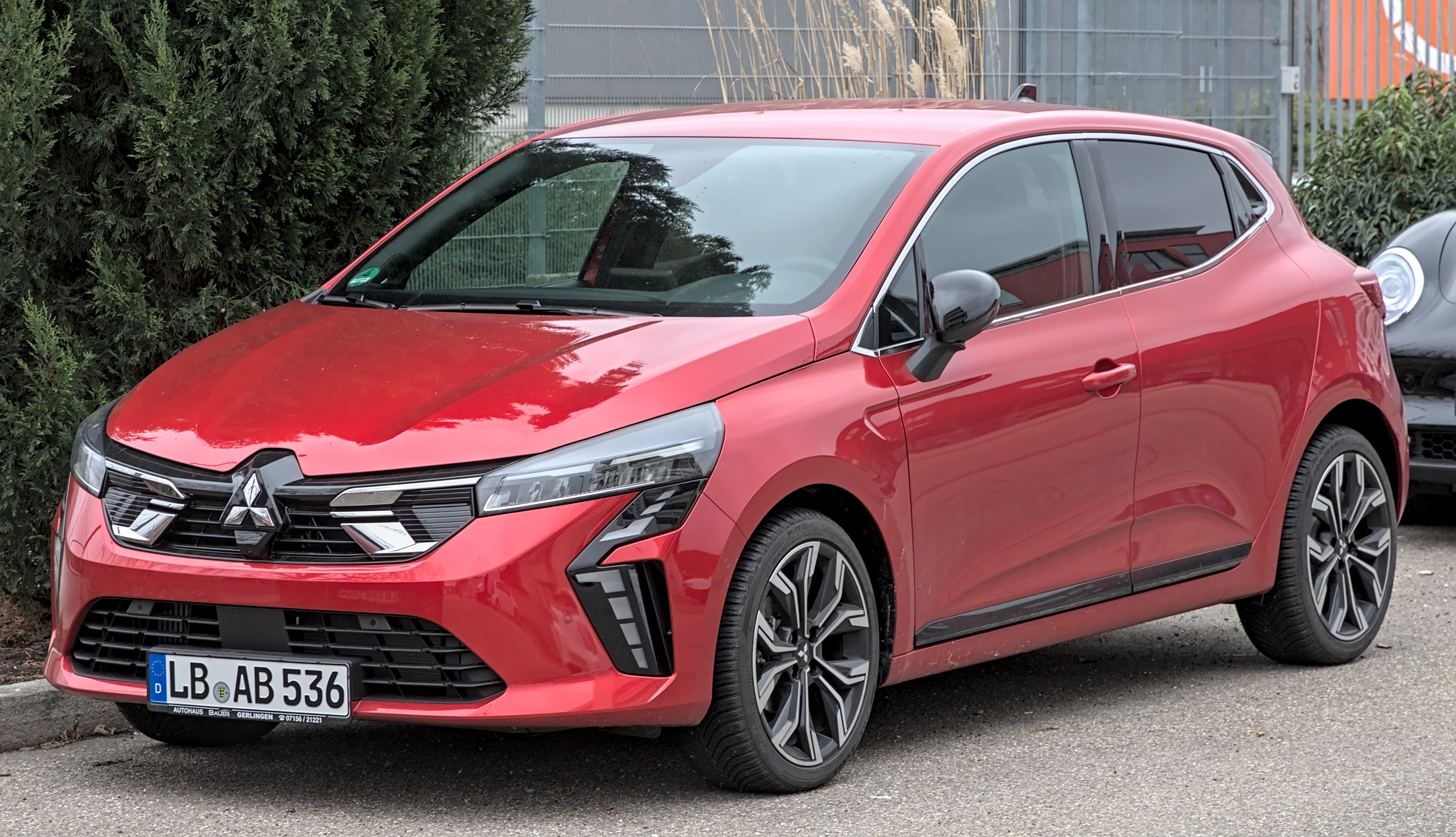
2023 Mitsubishi Colt (front view)

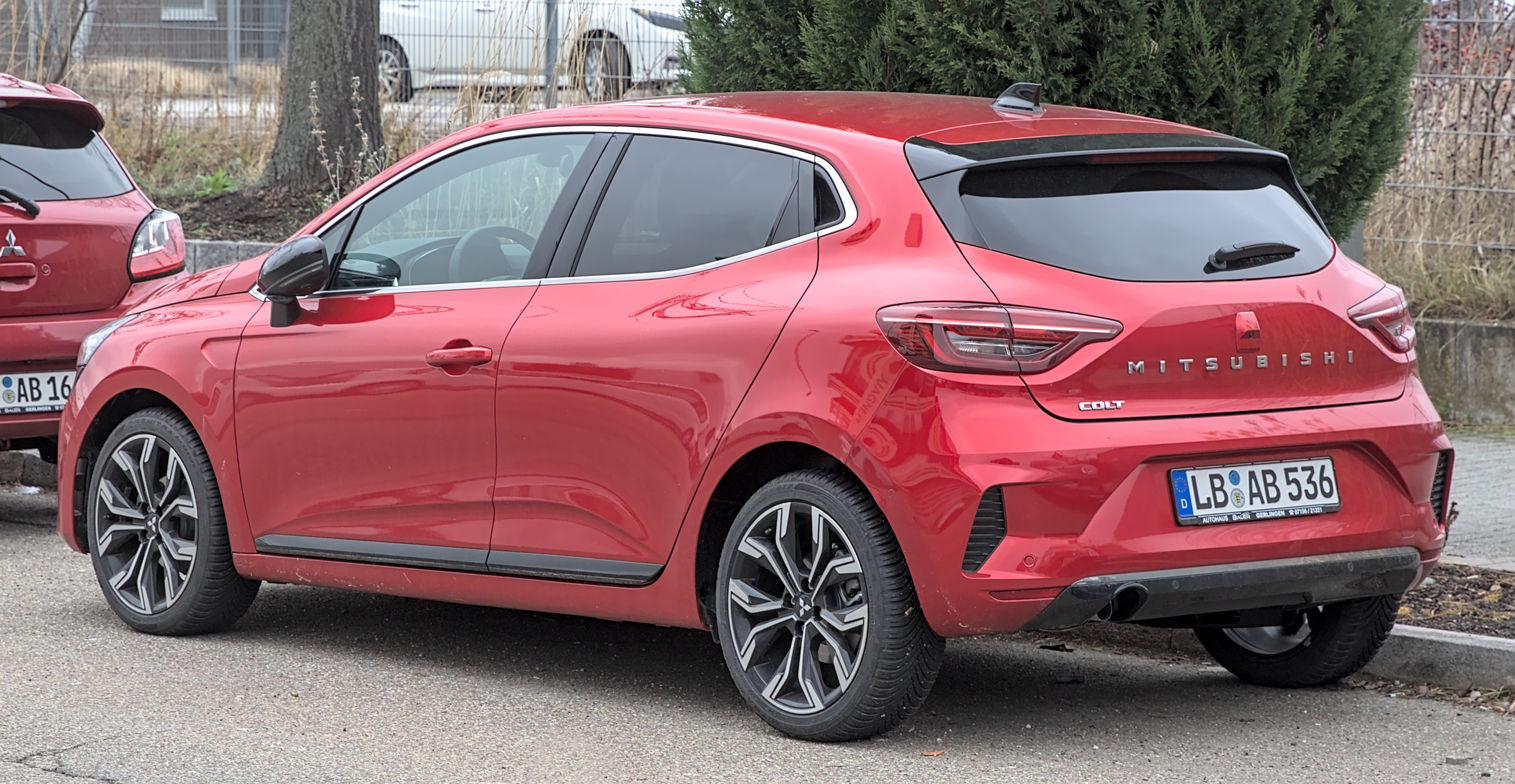
2023 Mitsubishi Colt (rear view)

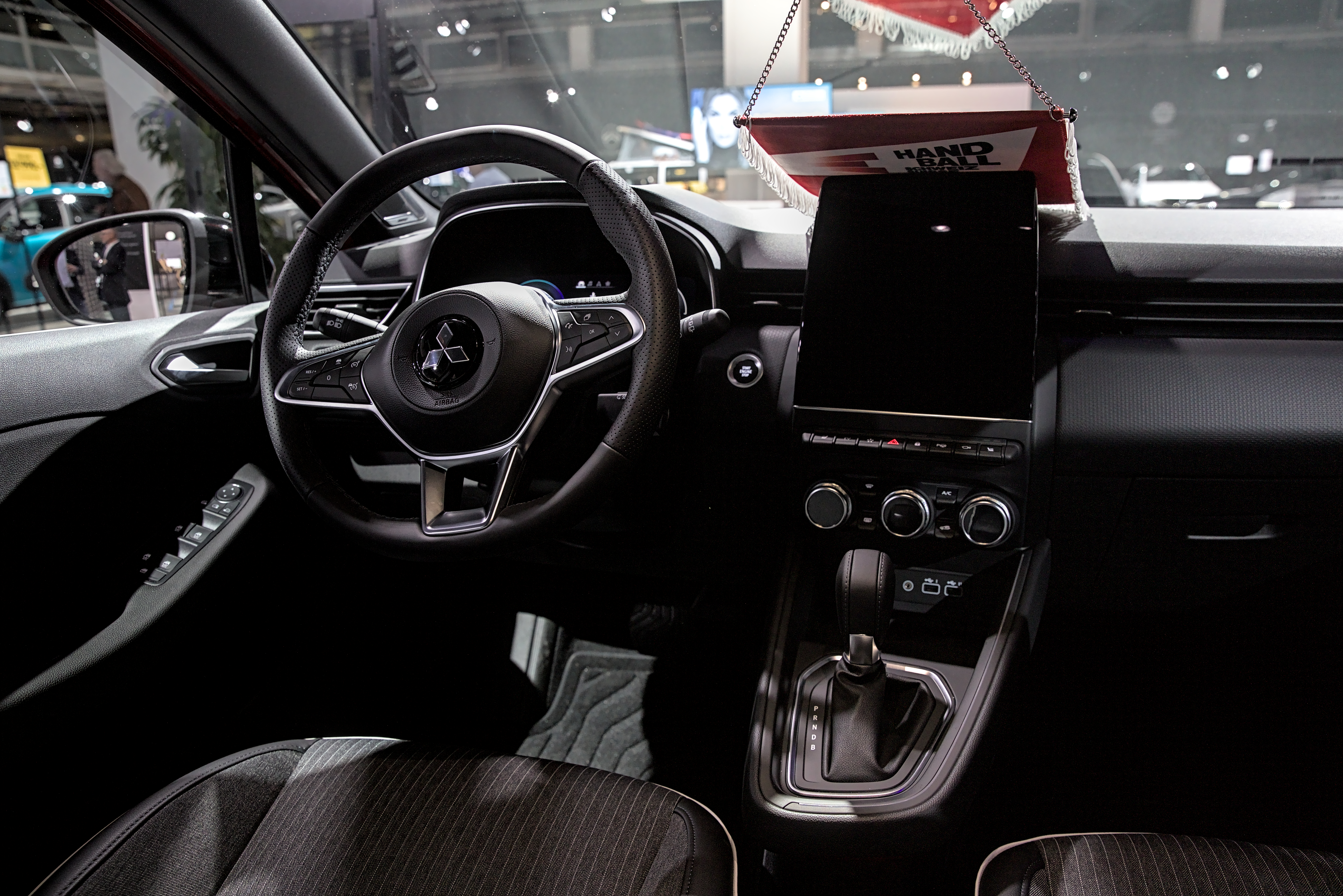
Interior

== Concept cars ==
The Colt was the base platform for a number of Mitsubishi concept cars.

=== Colt 600 convertible (1962) ===
The Colt 600 convertible was a concept two-seat convertible version of the production Colt 600 sedan introduced at the 9th Tokyo Motor Show in 1962 by Shin Mitsubishi Heavy-Industries, It was never offered to the public.

Colt Targa (1986)

The Colt Targa Concept was a futuristic looking two-door, two-seater version of the Colt with its roof chopped off and shorter windshield and side windows. It was driven by Jackie Chan in the 1986 Hong Kong film Armour of God. It was a special one-off model made by Mitsubishi for this movie.

=== CZ2 (2001) ===
The CZ2 was a prototype urban car which presaged the next generation of the Colt.

=== CZ3 Tarmac (2001) ===
The CZ3 Tarmac was a larger version of the CZ2, sharing the same platform but with more interior space and a larger engine. It was also a possible replacement for the Mitsubishi Lancer Evolution as the company's vehicle in the World Rally Championship.

=== CZ3 Tarmac Spyder (2003) ===
The CZ3 Tarmac Spyder was a concept convertible version of the CZ3 Tarmac. It debuted at the 2003 North American International Auto Show in Detroit.

=== CZ2 cabriolet (2003) ===
The CZ2 cabriolet was a convertible version of the 2001 CZ2 prototype. It was shown at the 73rd Geneva Motor Show in Geneva, Switzerland in 2003.

=== Colt EV (2005) ===
The 2005 Mitsubishi Colt EV was an electric car driven by two in-wheel motors located in the rear wheels each producing a power of 20 kW (27 hp) and 600 N·m of torque without the need for a transmission. This gave the car a top speed of 150 km/h (93 mph) and an estimated range of 150 km (93 mi) with a 13 kWh battery pack. It had a suggested price tag of US$19,000.
