= Mitsubishi Colt 600 =

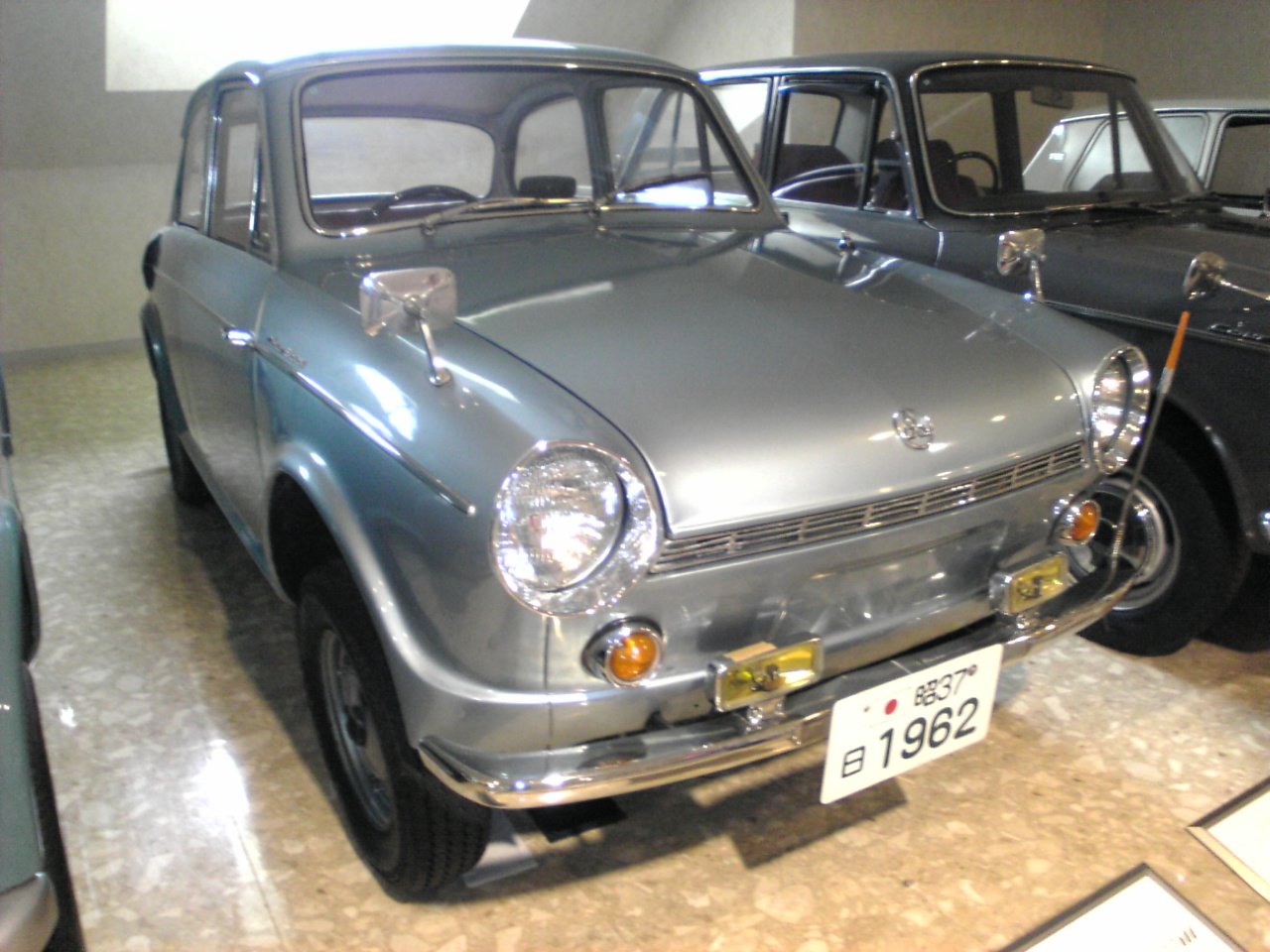

Overview
- Manufacturer: Shin Mitsubishi Heavy-Industries, Ltd
- Production: 1962–1965

Body and chassis
- Body style: 2-door sedan
- Layout: Rear-engine, rear-wheel drive

Powertrain
- Engine: 594 cc NE35B, air-cooled OHV Straight-twin engine
- Transmission: 3-speed manual

Dimensions
- Wheelbase: 2,065 mm (81.3 in)
- Length: 3,385 mm (133.3 in)
- Width: 1,410 mm (56 in)
- Height: 1,370 mm (54 in)
- Curb weight: 555 kg (1,224 lb)

Chronology
- Predecessor: Mitsubishi 500
- Successor: Mitsubishi Colt 800

The Mitsubishi Colt 600 is a five-seat, two-door passenger sedan produced by Shin Mitsubishi Heavy-Industries, Ltd - one of the companies which would become Mitsubishi Motors. It was rear-engined and rear wheel drive, powered by an air-cooled 594 cc twin-cylinder OHV engine producing 25 PS (18 kW), and debuted in July 1962 as the successor to the company's Mitsubishi 500 Super Deluxe. The 600 was the first Mitsubishi to bear the "Colt" name. Top speed was 100 km/h (62 mph).

A convertible version—the company's first "show car"— was exhibited at the 9th Tokyo Motor Show, but was never offered for public sale. A replica of that car was used to promote the new Mitsubishi Colt cabriolet at the 75th Geneva Motor Show in 2005.

Following the racing success of its predecessor, Mitsubishi entered Colt 600 touring cars in the 1963 Malaysian Grand Prix, where they placed second and third in the under 600 cc class. The following year the Colt 600 managed to take class honors in Malaysia. Production ended in 1965, in favor of the considerably more modern (still two-stroke, but water-cooled) Colt 800 fastback.

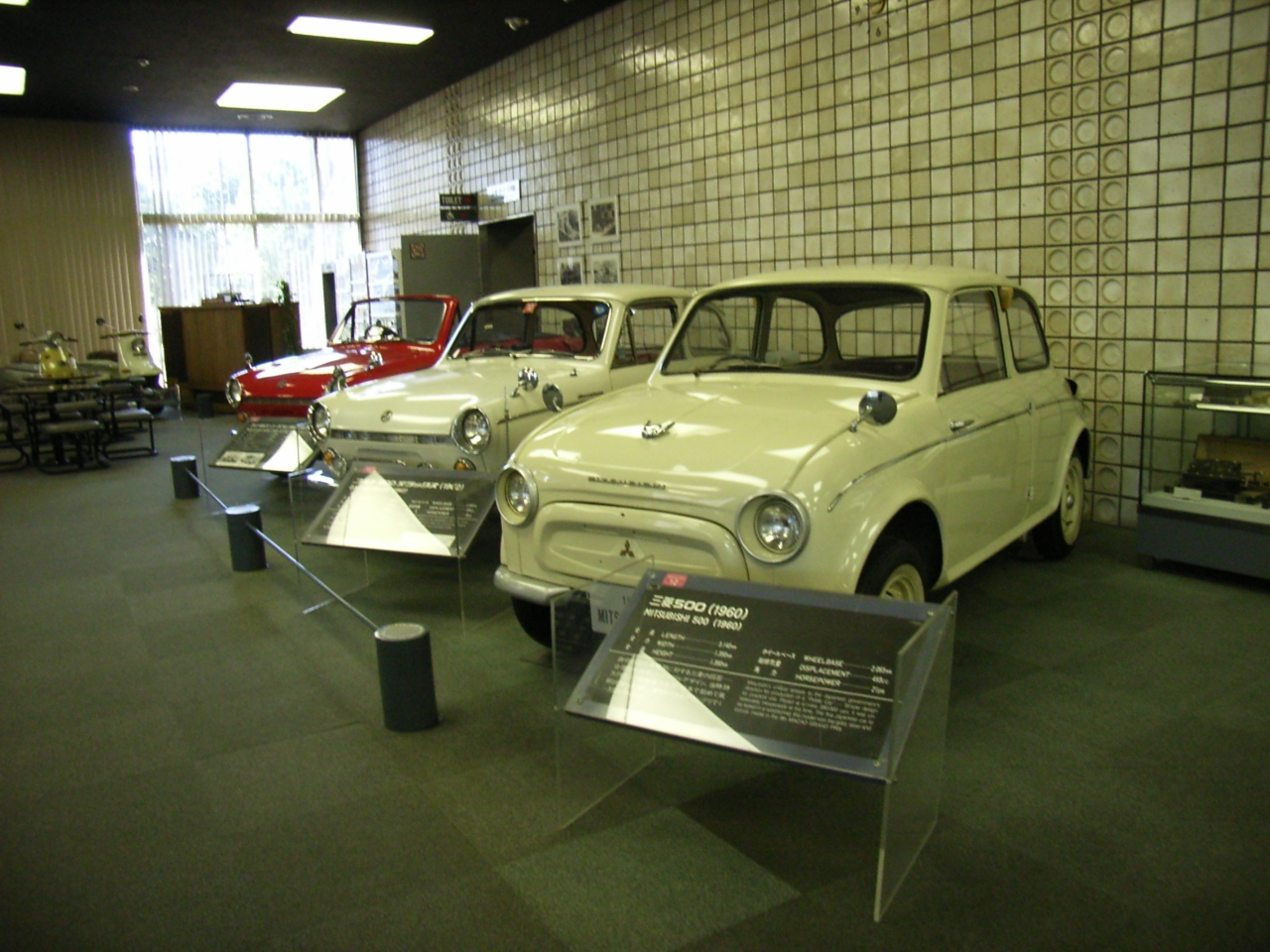
A Mitsubishi 600 sedan (centre), flanked by its "500" predecessor in the foreground and a red Colt 600 convertible in the background.
