= Mitsubishi 500 =

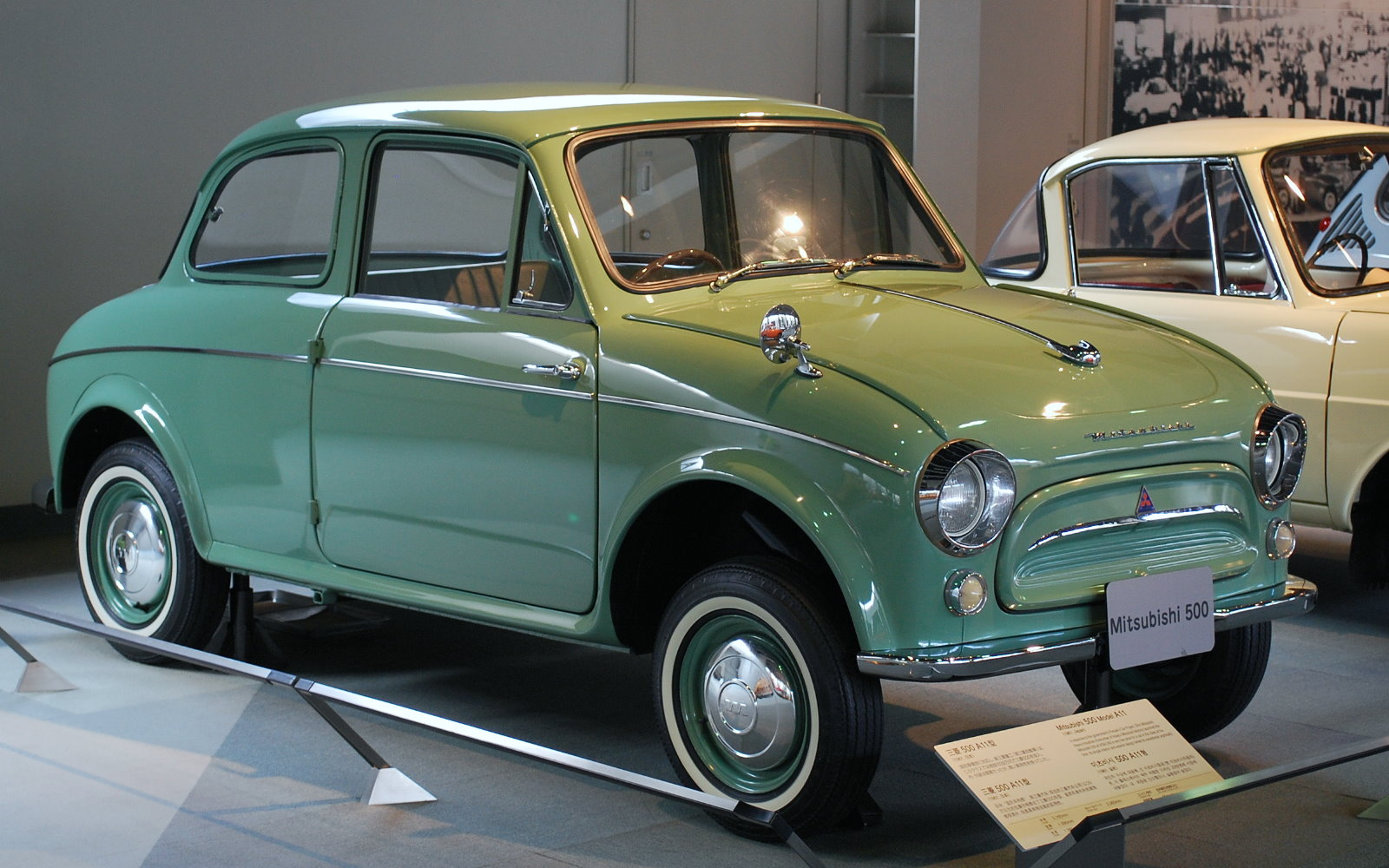

Overview
- Manufacturer: Shin Mitsubishi Heavy-Industries, Ltd
- Production: 1960–1962
- Designer: Masataka Nimura, Munetaro Shigehiro, Tsutomu Ieda

Body and chassis
- Class: Compact car
- Body style: 2-door sedan
- Layout: RR layout

Powertrain
- Engine: 493 cc NE19A OHV I2; 594 cc NE35A OHV I2
- Transmission: 3-speed manual

Dimensions
- Wheelbase: 2,065 mm (81.3 in)
- Length: 3,140–3,160 mm (10 ft 4 in – 10 ft 4 in)
- Width: 1,390 mm (4 ft 7 in)
- Height: 1,380 mm (4 ft 6 in)
- Curb weight: 490 kg (1,080 lb)

Chronology
- Successor: Mitsubishi Colt 600

The Mitsubishi 500 was the first passenger car produced after the Second World War by Shin Mitsubishi Heavy-Industries, Ltd, one of the companies which would become Mitsubishi Motors. It was built from 1960 until 1962 and formed the basis for Mitsubishi's next model, the Colt 600. It was exported in small numbers.

Correspondance from 1999 indicates just eight surviving vehicles. As of 2026, four surviving vehicles remain. Two of those surviving vehicles are in Japanese automotive museums, and one was in the Petersen automotive museum in Los Angeles.

There is verified data and invoices to validate that the 4th surviving car is based in Great Britain and was purchased in 1999 for the sum of 2,400,000 Japanese Yen or £13,800 English pounds stirling. The car was described as extremely rare due to its totally unmolested original specification and roadworthy condition. That remains the case today in 2026. It's value today as a UNICORN historic vehicle is estimated to be between £40,000 and £80,000 and is considered a One of One car.

== History ==
First shown at the 1959 Tokyo Motor Show, it became available in 1960 at a cost of ¥390,000. It was powered by a rear mounted, air-cooled 493 cc two-cylinder engine with a single downdraught carburettor producing 21 PS (15.4 kW) at 5,000 rpm, driving the rear wheels through a three-speed manual transmission. The body was a monocoque, in order to be light and strong enough to reach the goal of seating four and reaching 100 km/h with such a small engine. Chassis code was A10, later A11.

=== 500 Super DeLuxe ===
Buoyed by its sales success, it was given an enlarged, 25 PS (18.4 kW) 594 cc engine (NE35A) in August 1961 for improved acceleration and durability. This model was known as the Mitsubishi 500 Super DeLuxe. The succeeding Colt 600 used a great deal of the 500 Super DeLuxe's underpinnings, including the engine and layout. The Mitsubishi 500 was never a Kei car: Kei regulations at the time of introduction mandated an engine no larger than 360 cc, which remained the limit until it was raised to 550 cc on 1 January 1976.

Museums (Past & Present Exhibits)

1.. Mitsubishi Auto Gallery (Okazaki Plant, Aichi, Japan)

Status: Permanent Collection / Present

Details: Located inside Mitsubishi Motors’ Okazaki Plant in Nagoya, this gallery holds an original Mitsubishi 500 on permanent display alongside early icons like the Model A and Silver Pigeon.

2.. Toyota Automobile Museum (Nagakute, Aichi, Japan)

Status: Permanent Collection (Rotates between display floor and museum archive storage)

Details: The museum owns a 1961 Mitsubishi 500 Super DeLuxe (Model A11) in its historical collection, representing the early "people's car" era of Japanese motoring.

3.. Petersen Automotive Museum (Los Angeles, California, USA)

Status: Past Temporary Exhibit (2018–2019)

Details: A 1960 Mitsubishi 500 (Model A10) was imported directly from Japan for the special exhibit "The Roots of Monozukuri: Creative Spirit in Japanese Automaking". It was on display from May 2018 to April 2019 before returning to its archive/owner

4.. Private owned in Great Britain

== Motorsport heritage ==
Although they are now more renowned for their contemporary successes in off-road racing with the Pajero-based Rally Raid vehicle and Lancer Evo-based WRC car, Mitsubishi's first "homologation special" was a Super DeLuxe-based touring car which the company prepared for the 1962 Macau Grand Prix. In an auspicious debut Kazuo Togawa took class honours, as the diminutive sedan swept the top four places in the "Under 750 cc" category.
