= Rear-engine, rear-wheel-drive layout =

Automotive design

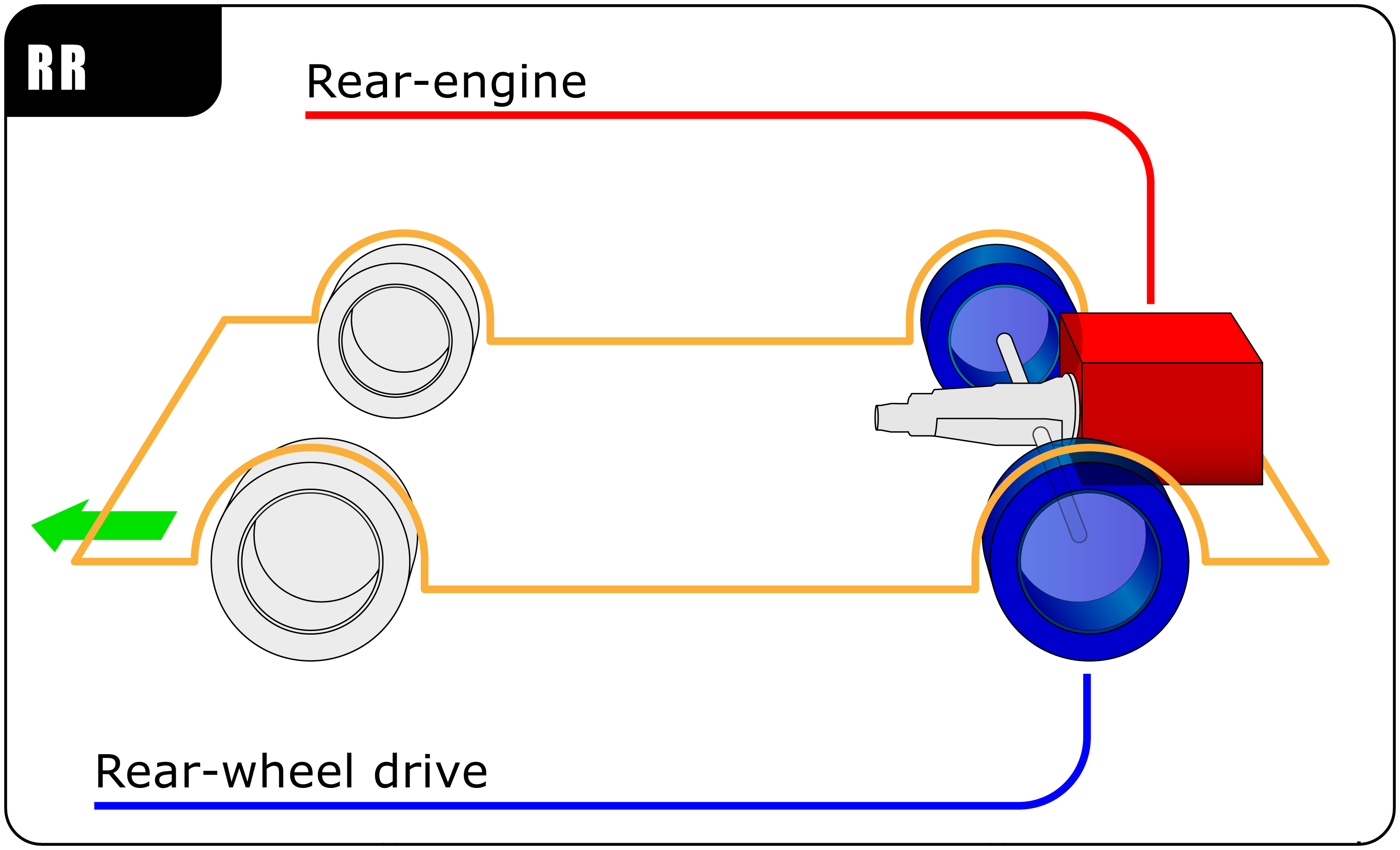
RR layout

In automotive design, an RR, or rear-engine, rear-wheel-drive, layout places both the engine and drive wheels at the rear of the vehicle. In contrast to the RMR layout, the center of mass of the engine is between the rear axle and the rear bumper. Although very common in transit buses and coaches due to the elimination of the drive shaft with low-floor buses, this layout has become increasingly rare in passenger cars.

== Overview ==
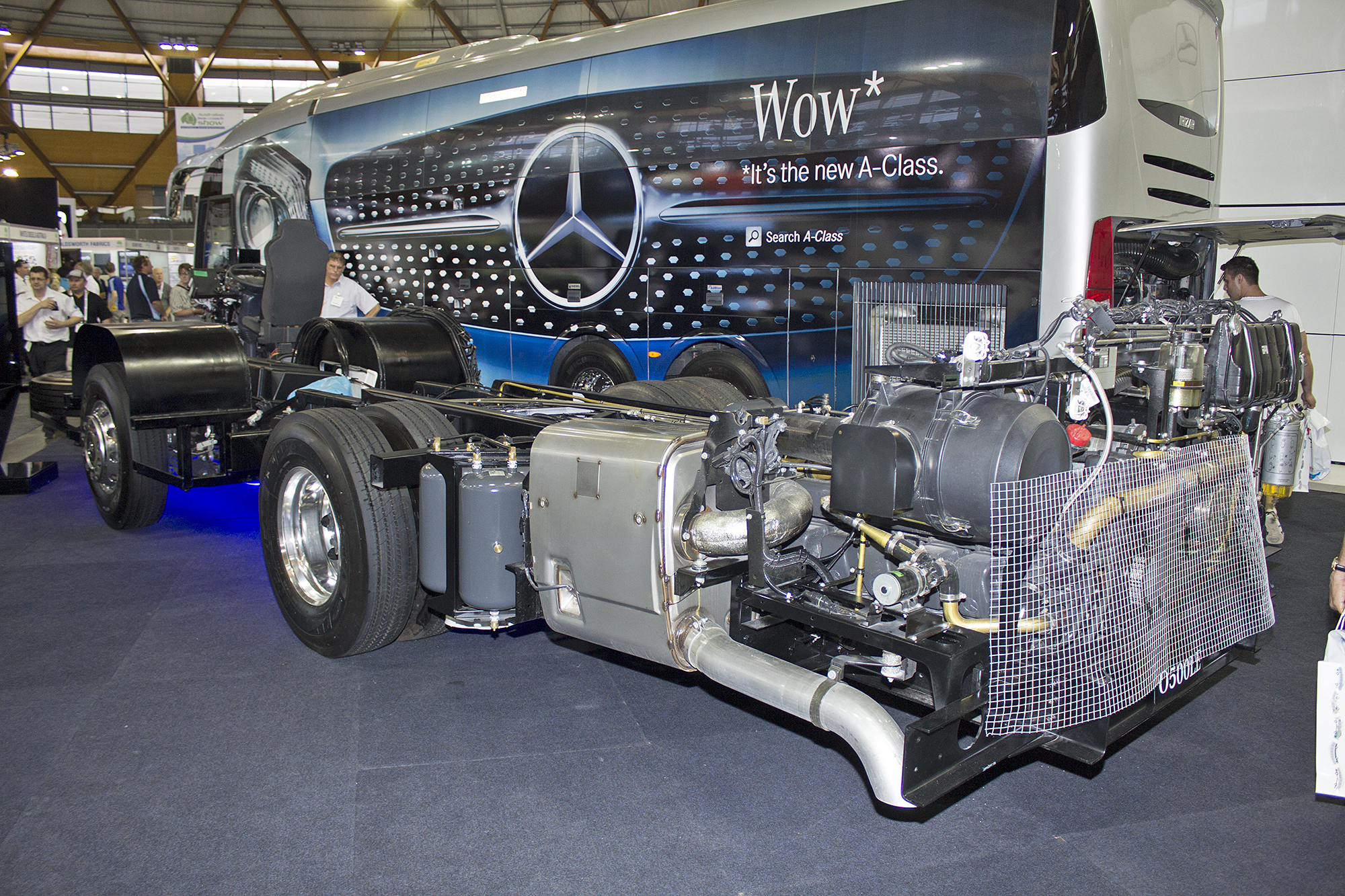
Mercedes-Benz O500LE city bus chassis showing the engine located far behind the rear axle

Most of the traits of the RR configuration are shared with the mid-engine rear-wheel-drive, or MR. Placing the engine near the driven rear wheels allows for a physically smaller, lighter, less complex, and more efficient drivetrain, since there is no need for a driveshaft, and the differential can be integrated with the transmission, commonly referred to as a transaxle. The front-engine front-wheel-drive layout also has this advantage.

Since the engine is typically the heaviest component of the car, putting it near the rear axle usually results in more weight over the rear axle than the front, commonly referred to as a rear weight bias. The farther back the engine, the greater the bias. Typical weight bias for an FF (front engine, front-wheel-drive) is 65/35 front/rear; for FR, 55/45; for MR, 45/55; for RR, 35/65. A static rear weight requires less forward brake bias, as load is more evenly distributed among all four wheels under braking. Similarly, a rear weight bias means that the driven wheels have increased traction when accelerating, allowing them to put more power on the ground and accelerate faster.

The disadvantage to a rear weight bias is that the car can become unstable and tend to oversteer, especially when decelerating (whether braking or lifting off the throttle; see lift-off oversteer). When this happens, rotational inertia dictates that the added weight away from the axis of rotation (generally the steering wheels) will be more likely to maintain the spin, especially under braking. This is an inherent instability in the design, making it easier to induce and more difficult to recover from a slide than in a less rear-weight-biased vehicle.

Under hard acceleration, the decreased weight over the front wheels means less traction, sometimes producing a tendency for rear-engined cars to understeer out of a corner.

In these respects, an RR can be considered to be an exaggeration of MR – harder braking, faster and earlier acceleration, and increased oversteer.

In off-road and low-traction situations, the RR layout has some advantages compared to other 2WD layouts. The weight is biased towards the driven wheels – as with FF vehicles. This both improves drive-wheel traction and reduces the tendency for the undriven wheels to dig in. In addition, the driving and steering requirements are split between front and rear – as with FR vehicles – making it less likely for either to lose traction. Many dune buggies successfully use a Volkswagen Beetle as the donor car for this reason. The relative simplicity and light weight compared to 4WD can therefore sometimes outweigh the disadvantage of only having two driven wheels.

Where RR differs from MR is in that the engine is located outside the wheelbase. The major advantage of MR – low moment of inertia – is negated somewhat (though still lower than FR), and there is more room for passengers and cargo (though usually less than FR). Furthermore, because both axles are on the same side of the engine, it is technically more straightforward to drive all four wheels, than in a mid-engined configuration (though there have been more high-performance cars with the M4 layout than with R4). Finally, a rear-mounted engine has empty air (often at a lower pressure) behind it when moving, allowing more efficient cooling for air-cooled vehicles (more of which have been RR than liquid-cooled, such as the Volkswagen Beetle, and one of the few production air-cooled turbocharged cars, the Porsche 930).

For liquid-cooled vehicles, however, this layout presents a disadvantage, since it requires either increased coolant piping from a front-mounted radiator (meaning more weight and complexity), or relocating the radiator(s) to the sides or rear, and adding air ducting to compensate for the lower airflow at the rear of the car.

Due to the handling difficulty, the need for more space efficiency, and the near ubiquitous use of liquid-cooled engines in modern cars, most manufacturers have abandoned the RR layout. The major exception is Porsche, who has developed the 911 for over 60 years and has taken advantage of the benefits of RR while mitigating its drawbacks to acceptable levels, lately with the help of electronic aids.

== History ==
One of first RR cars was Tatra 77 of 1934, the first serial-produced aerodynamic car, designed by Hans Ledwinka. Tatra used this layout until end of production of T700 in 1999. In case of T613 and T700 Tatra used layout with engine above rear axle, which reduced some disadvantages of RR layout. Mercedes-Benz also produced several models of RR cars in this period, starting with the 130H (1934). The radical 1930s Tatra format (air-cooled, rear engine and streamlined, teardrop design) was an influence on Ferdinand Porsche's 'People's Car' (Volkswagen) for Adolf Hitler. As well as being the most produced car ever, it set a trend for RR small cars that lasted well into the 1960s. The final form of the RR Volkswagen was the Type 4 of 1968, which flattened the engine (or 'pancake'), allowing for luggage spaces front and rear.

Porsche has continued to develop its 911 model as a rear-engined vehicle, although they have introduced multiple all-wheel-drive models. Most notably, the 911 Turbo has been sold as AWD-only since the release of the 993 model. Race-oriented models such as the GT3 and twin-turbocharged GT2 remain solely RR, however.

Another manufacturer to implement the RR configuration was the DeLorean Motor Company with its DeLorean sports car. To compensate for the uneven (35/65) weight distribution caused by the rear-mounted engine, DeLorean used rear wheels with a diameter slightly greater than the front wheels. Before that was the rear-engined Škoda's from Škoda 1000 MB (produced from 1964) to Škoda 120/135/136 (produced until 1990) or the Polski Fiat 126p (produced until October 2000).

A range of sports road cars and racing cars with the RR layout was produced by the French company Alpine. These had bodies made of composite materials and used mechanical components made by Renault. (Alpine was eventually acquired by Renault; the A610 was a Renault product that used the Alpine name.)

Early cars using the RR layout included the Tucker, Volkswagen Beetle, Porsche 356, Chevrolet Corvair, NSU Prinz, ZAZ Zaporozhets and Hino Contessa.

== Present day ==
Many modern electric cars use an RR layout for base variants with a single motor due to the low weight and cooling requirements of the electric motor; notably the Tesla Model 3, Tesla Cybertruck and GMC Hummer EV also use this layout for their base variants.

Most modern heavy duty buses use an extreme RR layout. In transit buses this can be used to make a very low floor level in the first two-thirds of the bus, thus making disabled access much easier. Some Type D American school buses also have an RR layout.

Most tour buses and coaches also employ a similar design, however the free space is usually used for luggage, and sometimes air conditioning equipment.

== Examples ==
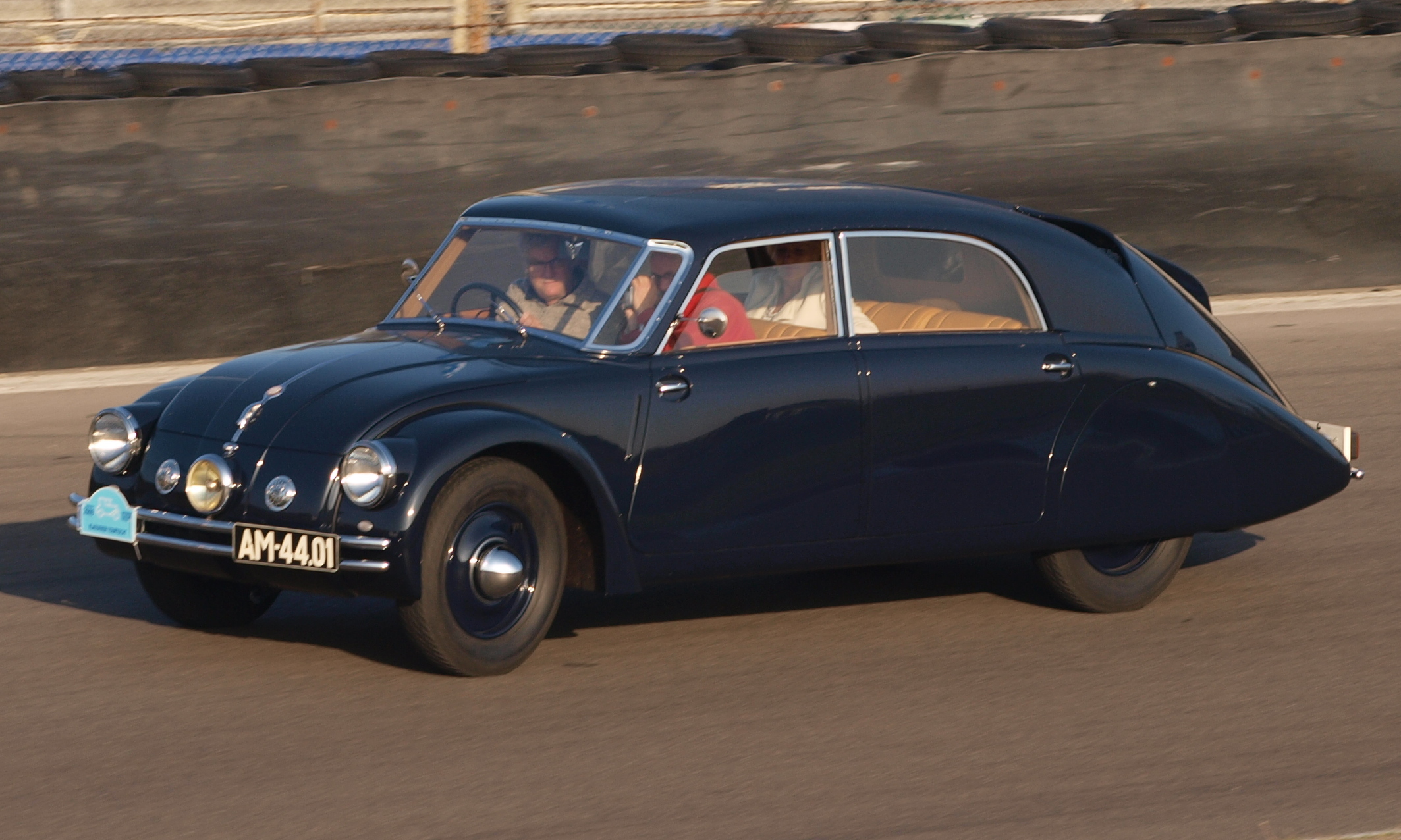
Tatra 77, one of the first streamlined cars with RR platform

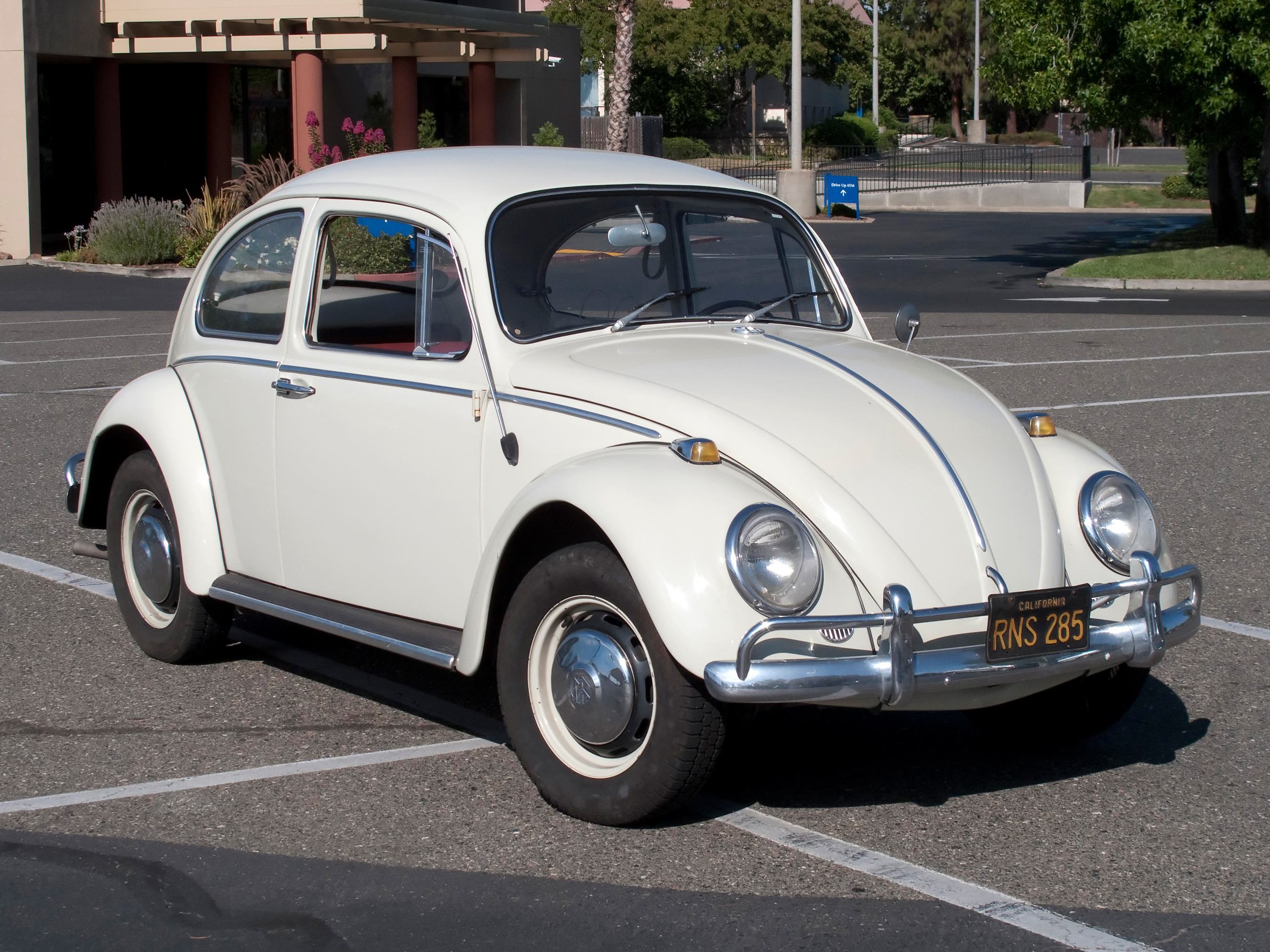
Volkswagen Bug/Beetle (VW Type 1)

Illustration of the Beetle's engine air cooling in a Volkswagen Bug/Beetle (VW Type 1)

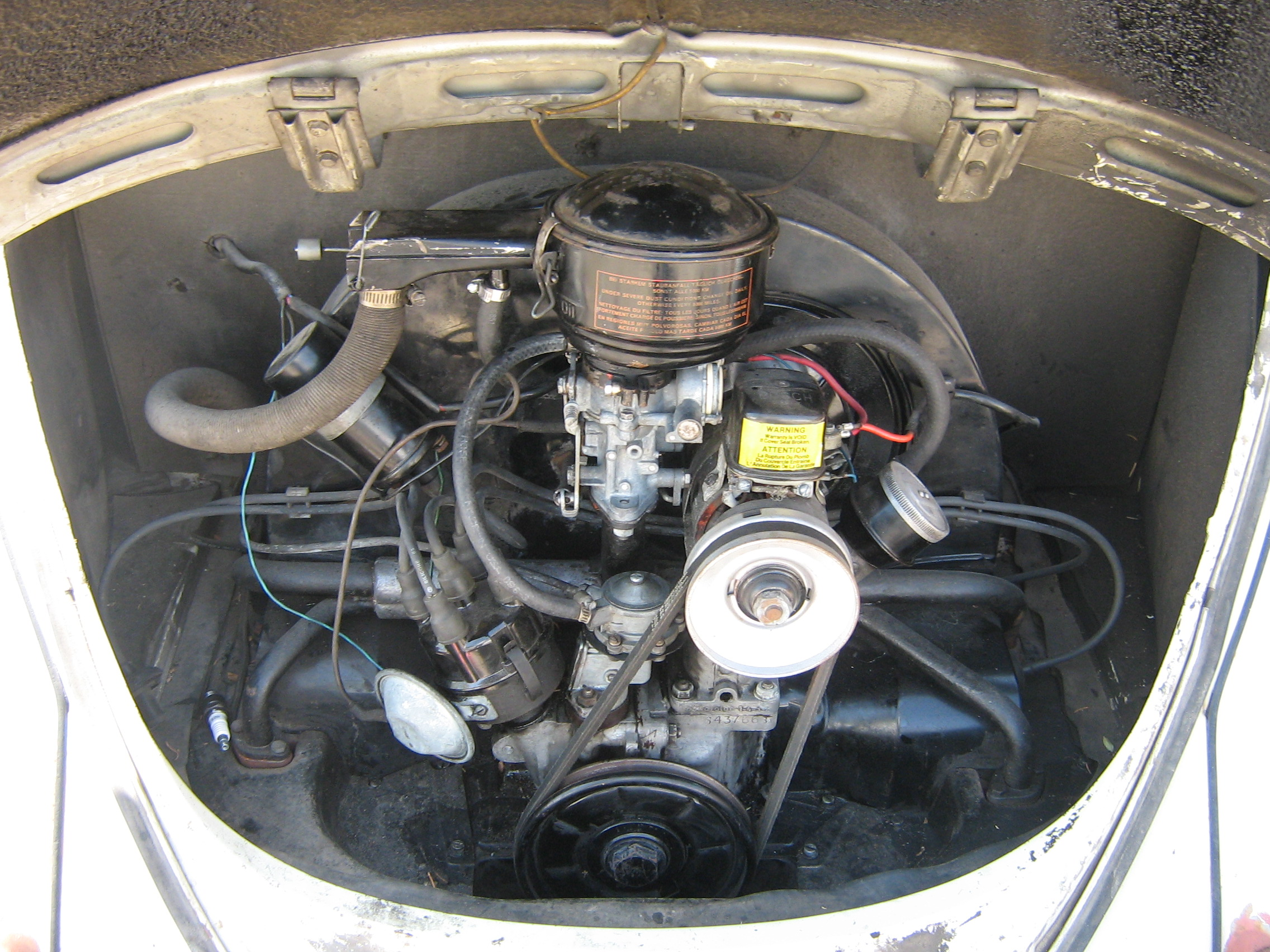
1962 Volkswagen Beetle engine

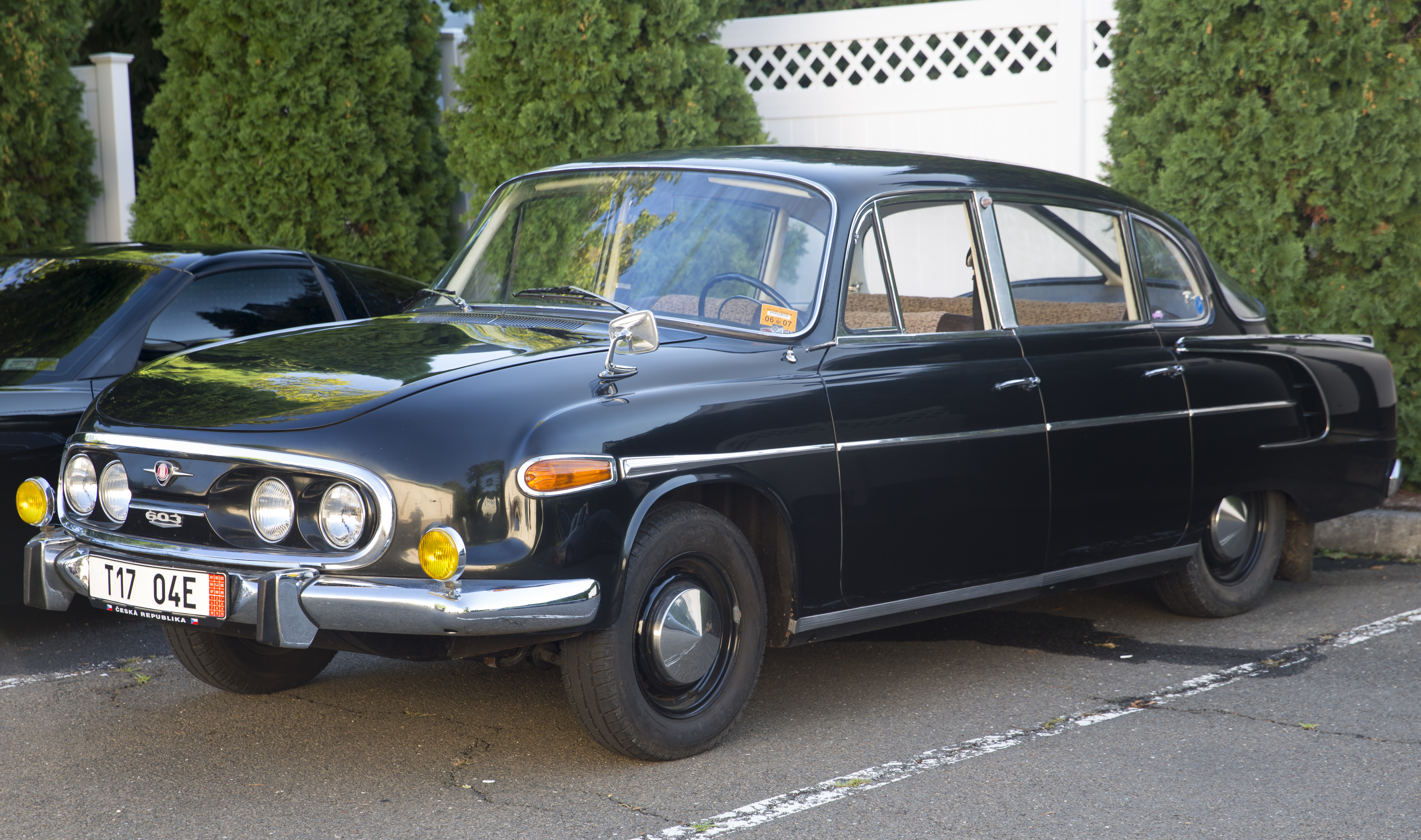
Tatra 603 with RR platform.

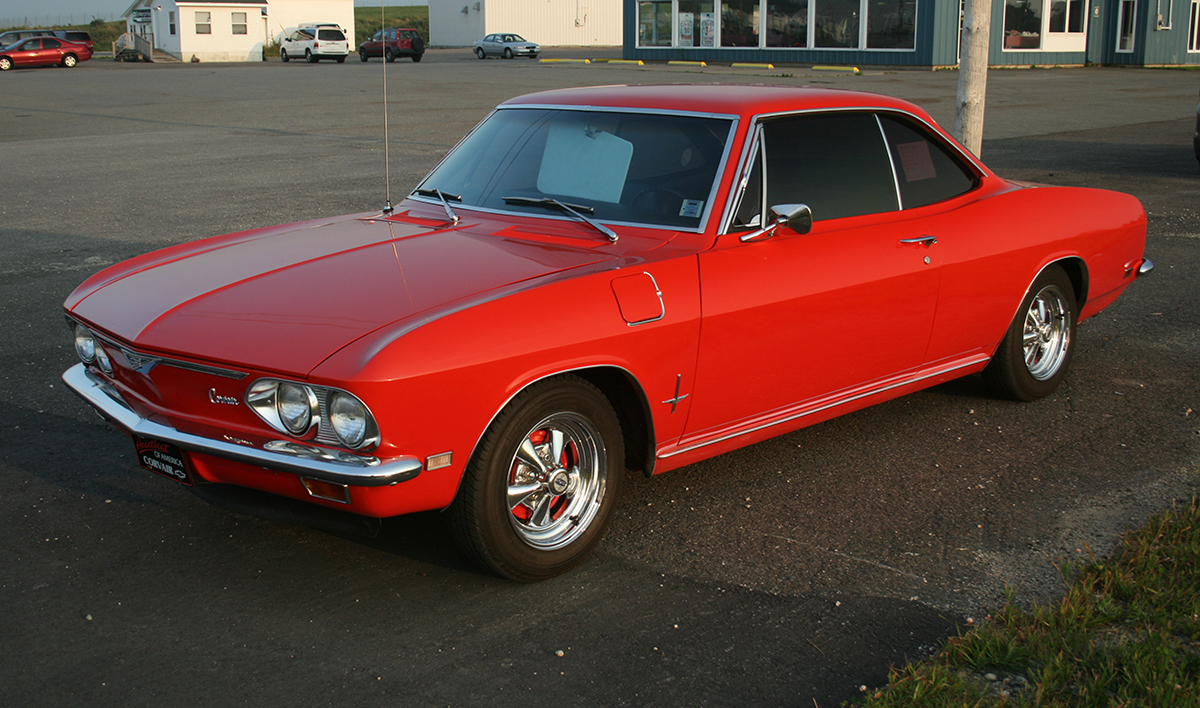
Chevrolet Corvair

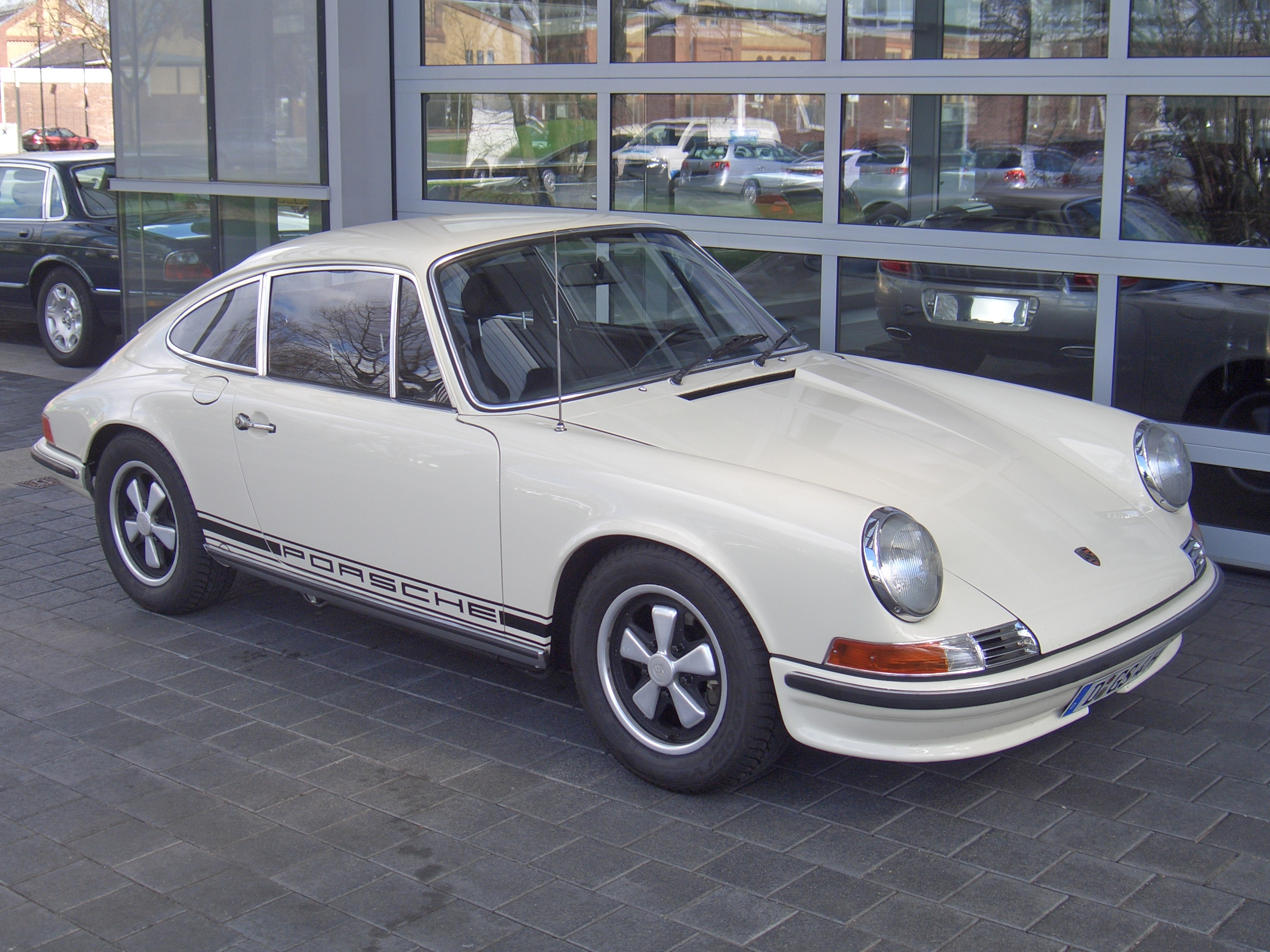
Porsche 911 with RR platform. Some current models are now all-wheel drive.

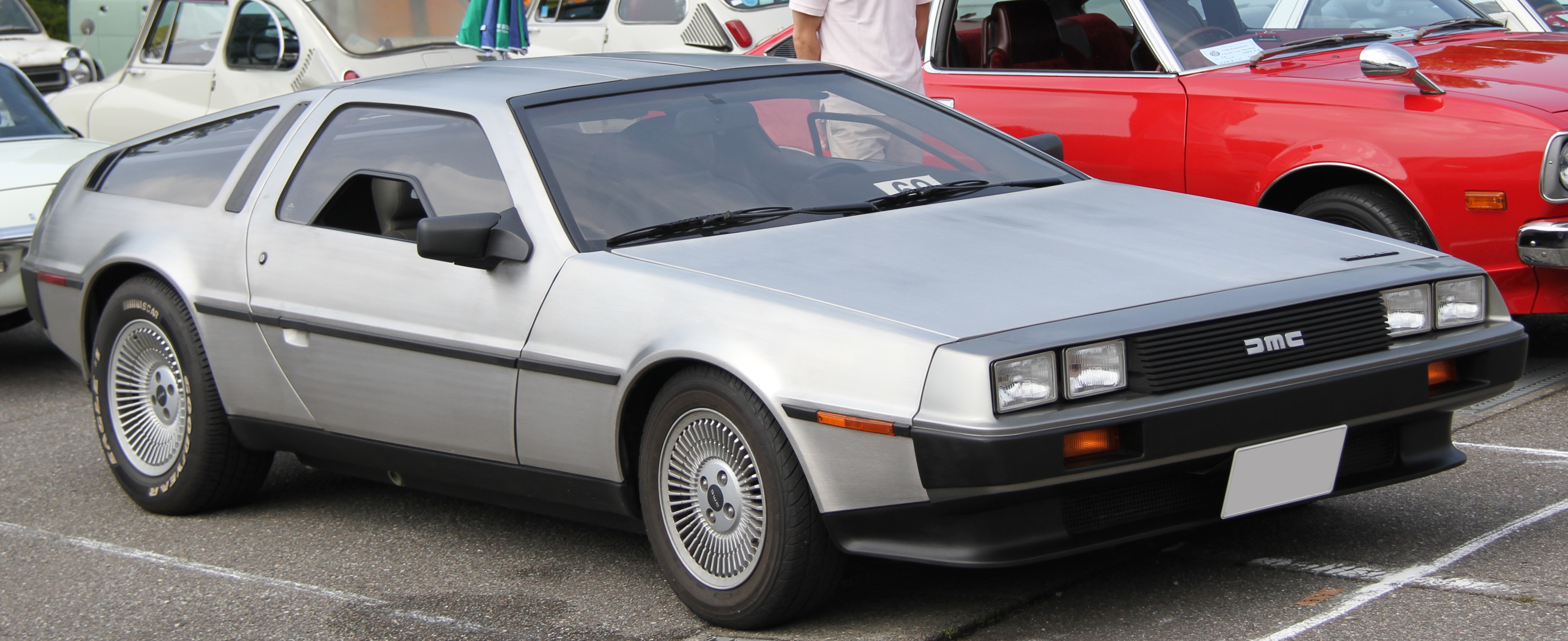
DMC DeLorean with RR platform.

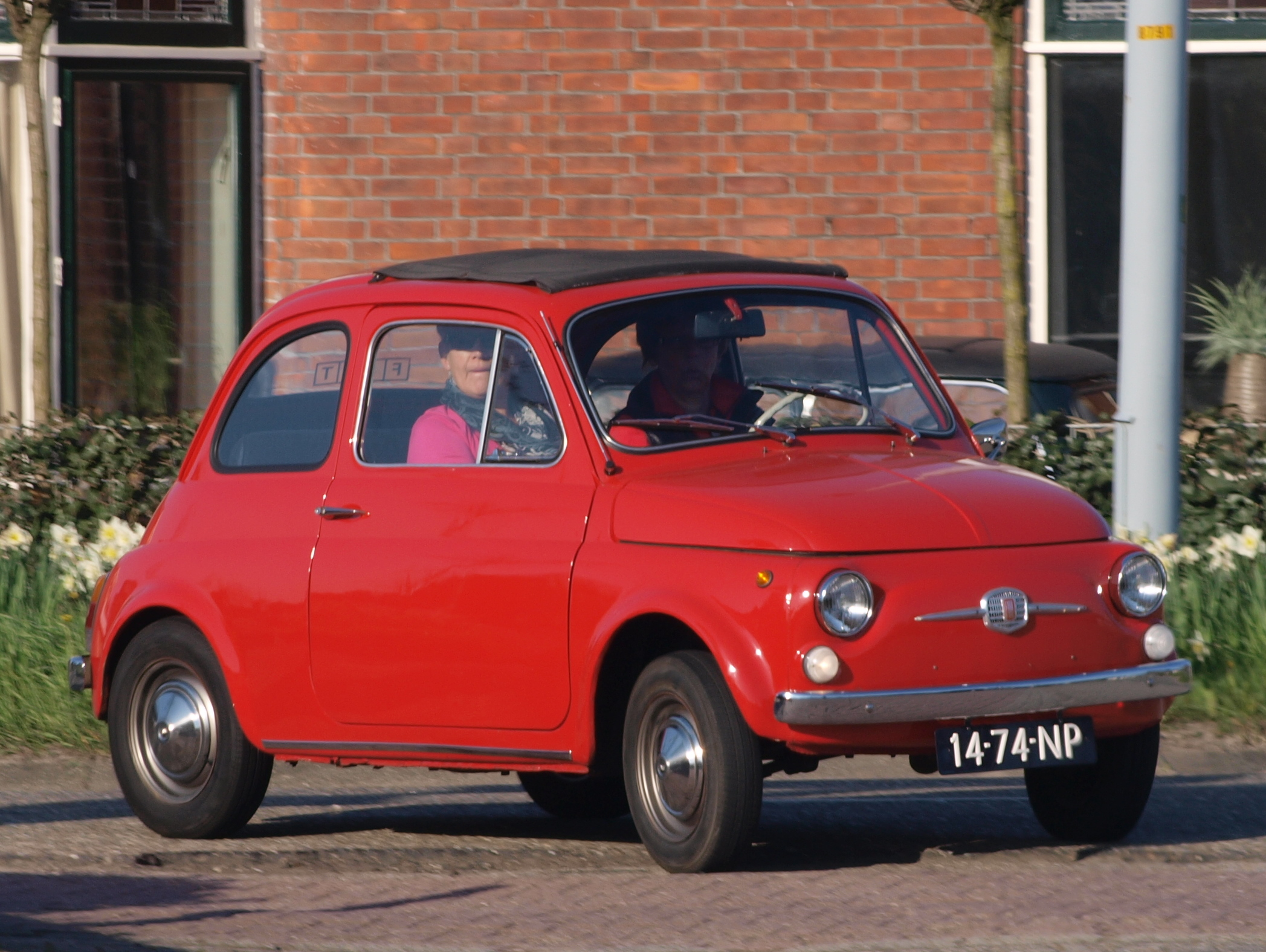
The original Fiat 500 was rear-engined.

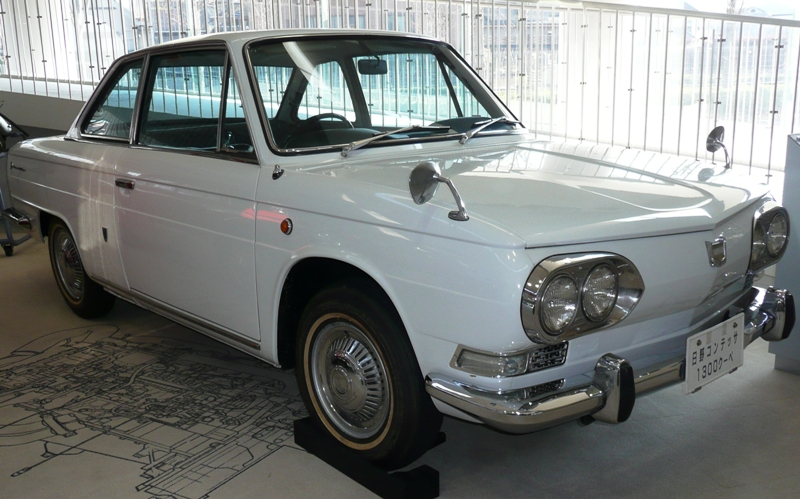
Hino Contessa

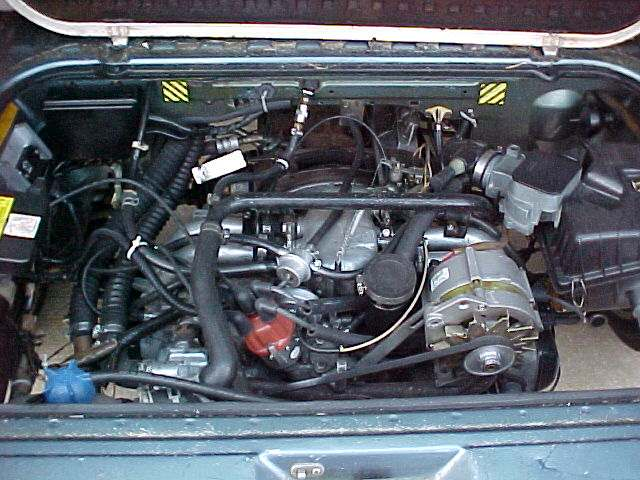
Four-cylinder Volkswagen Wasserboxer engine in the rear of a Volkswagen Type 2 (T3)

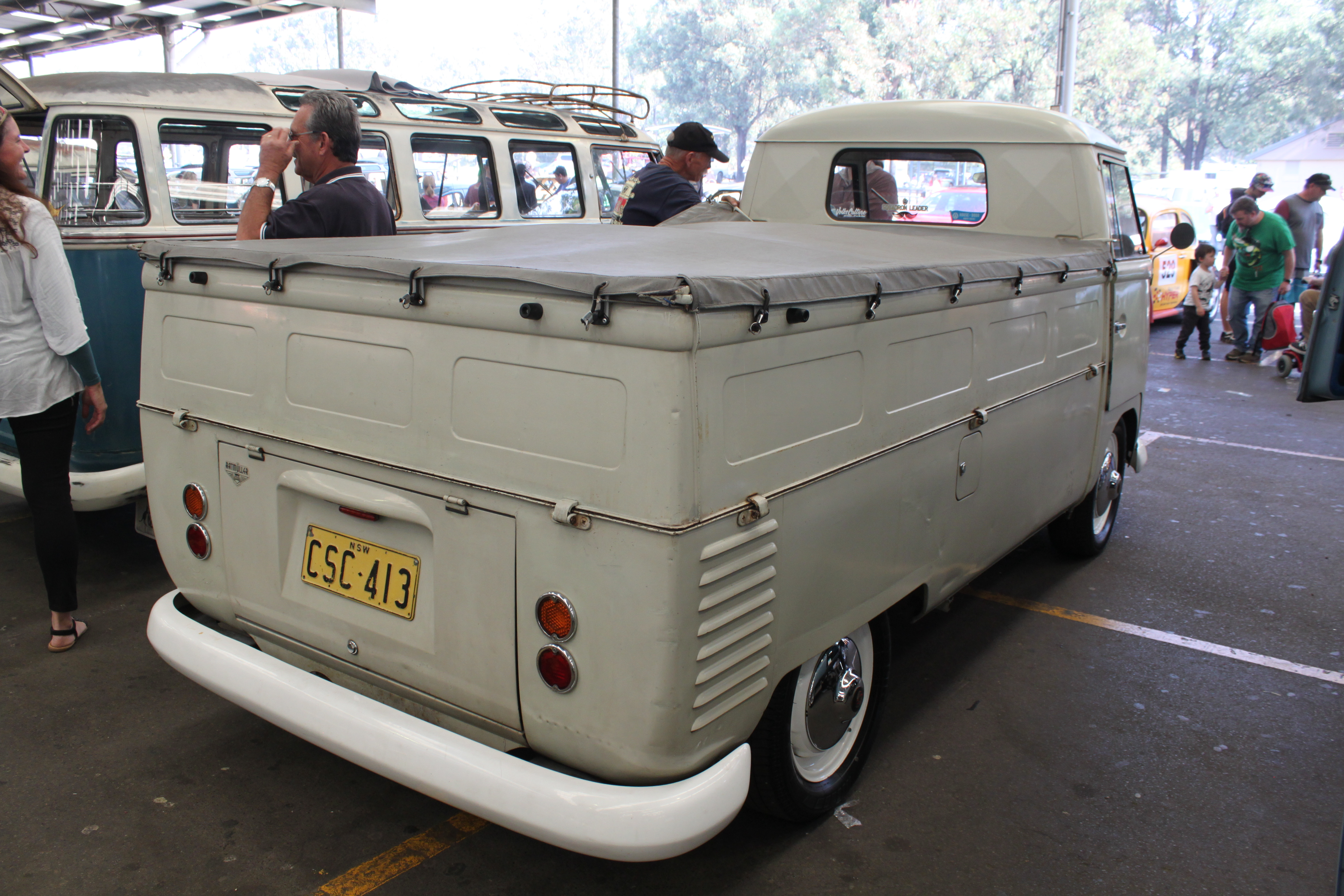
Volkswagen Type 2, Single-cab utility pickup

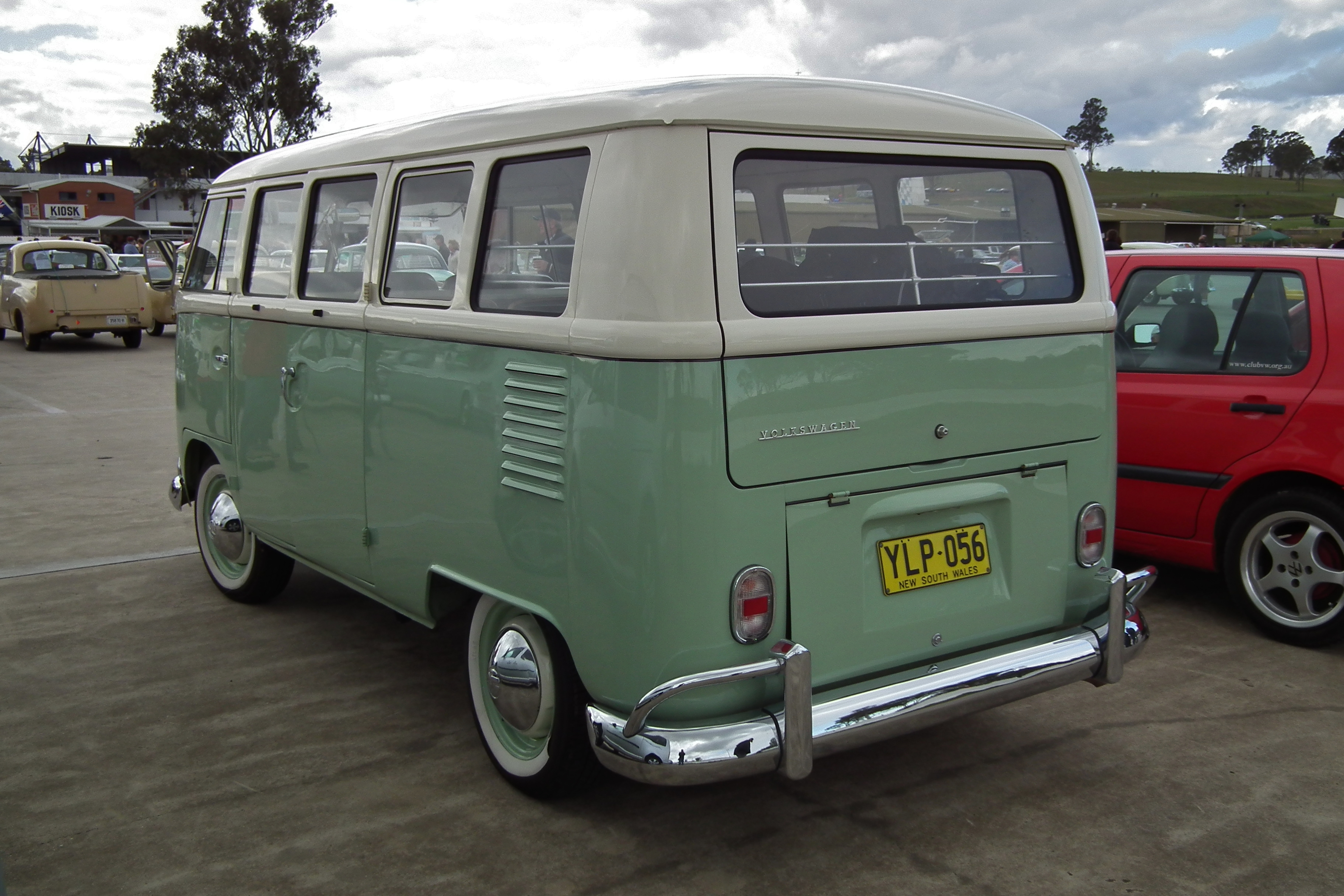
Volkswagen T1 Microbus

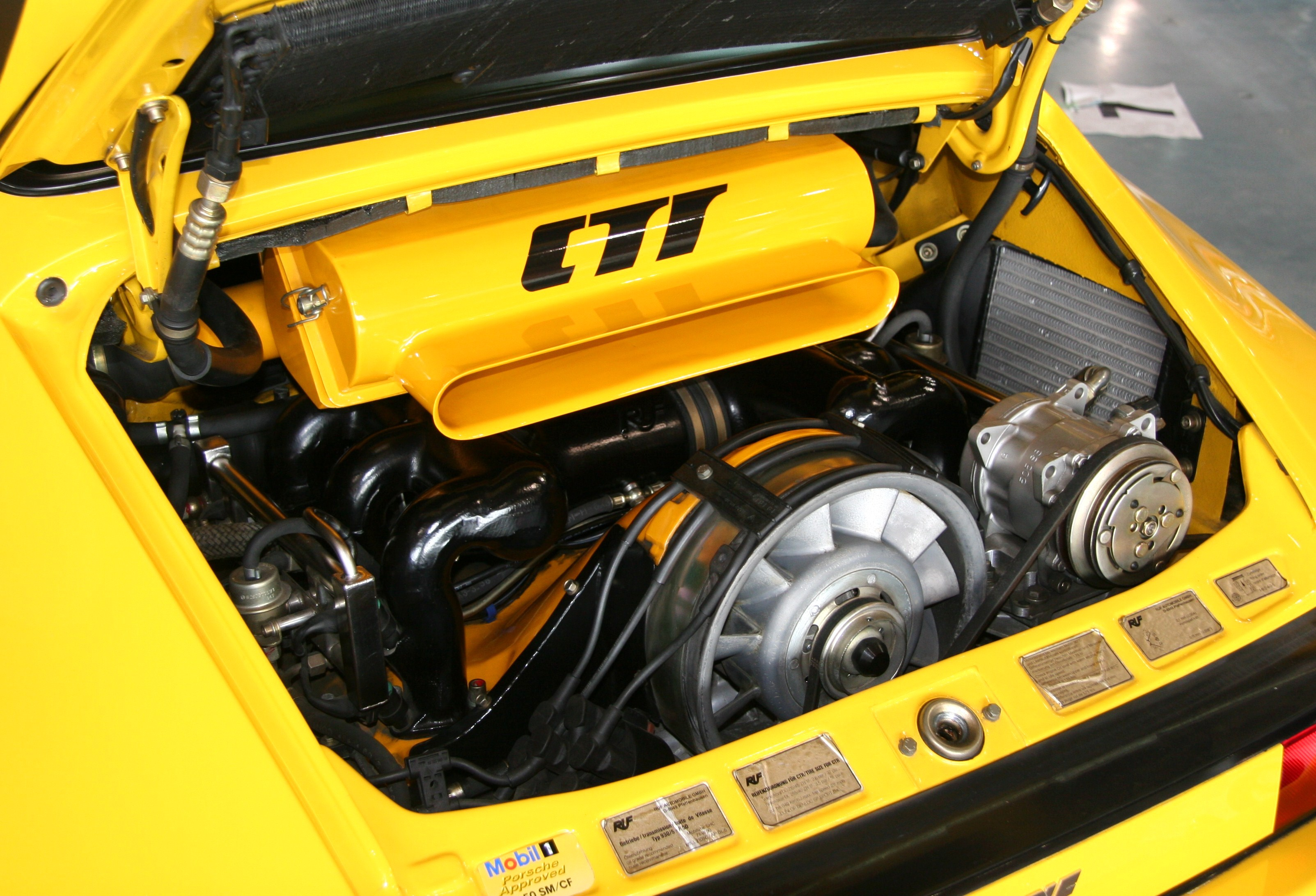
Ruf CTR Yellowbird rear powerplant.

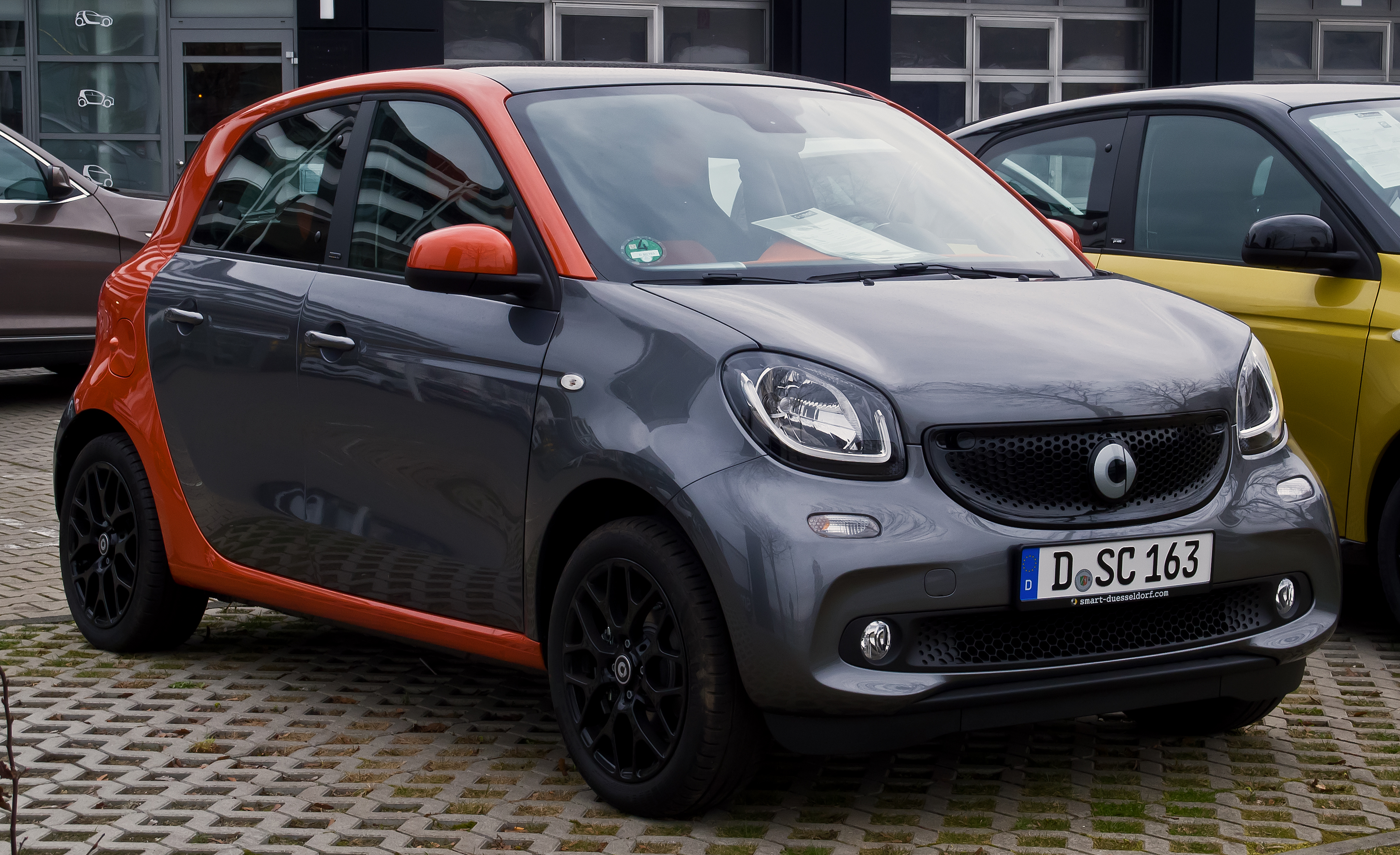
Second generation Smart Forfour

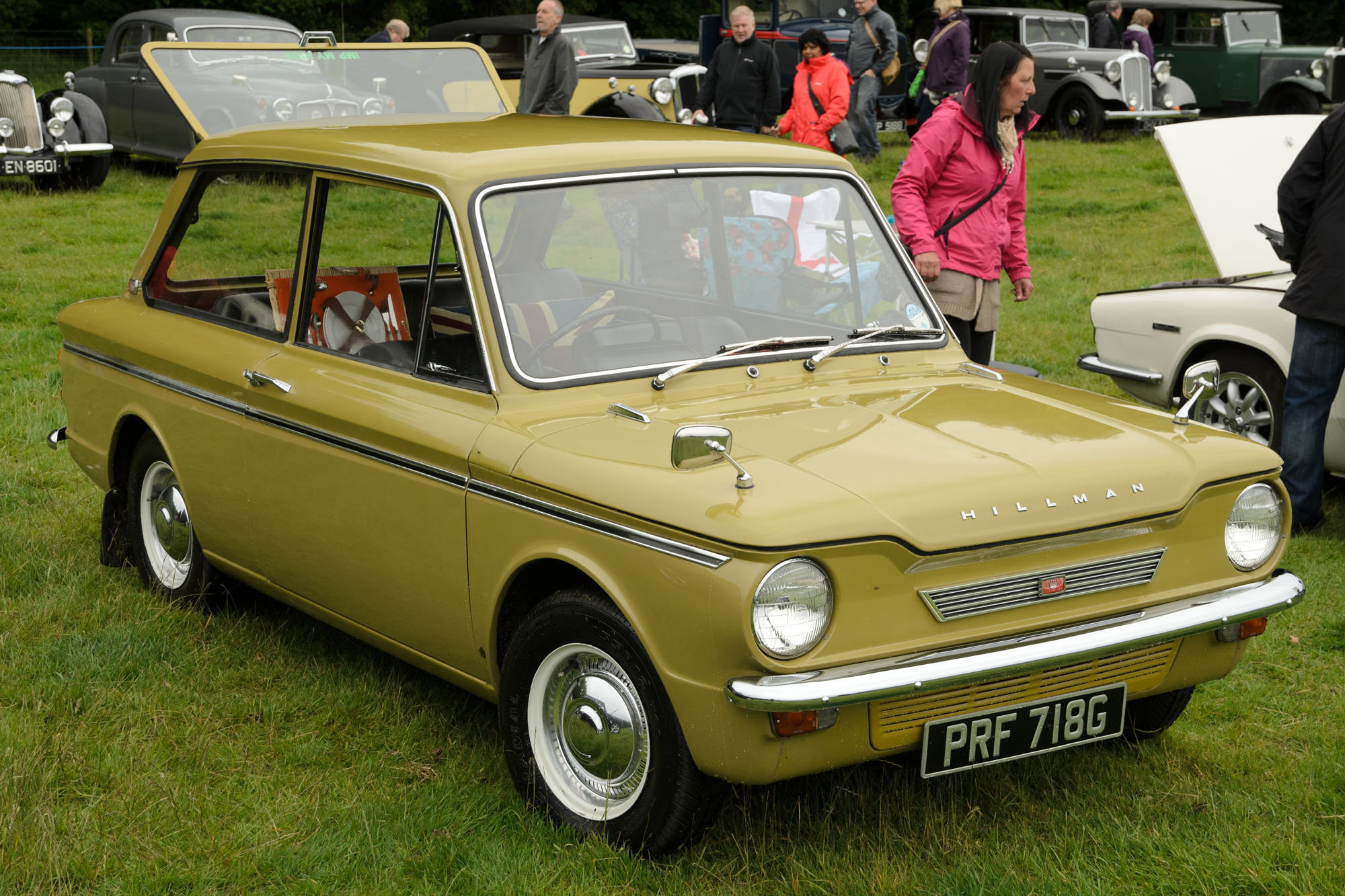
Hillman Imp

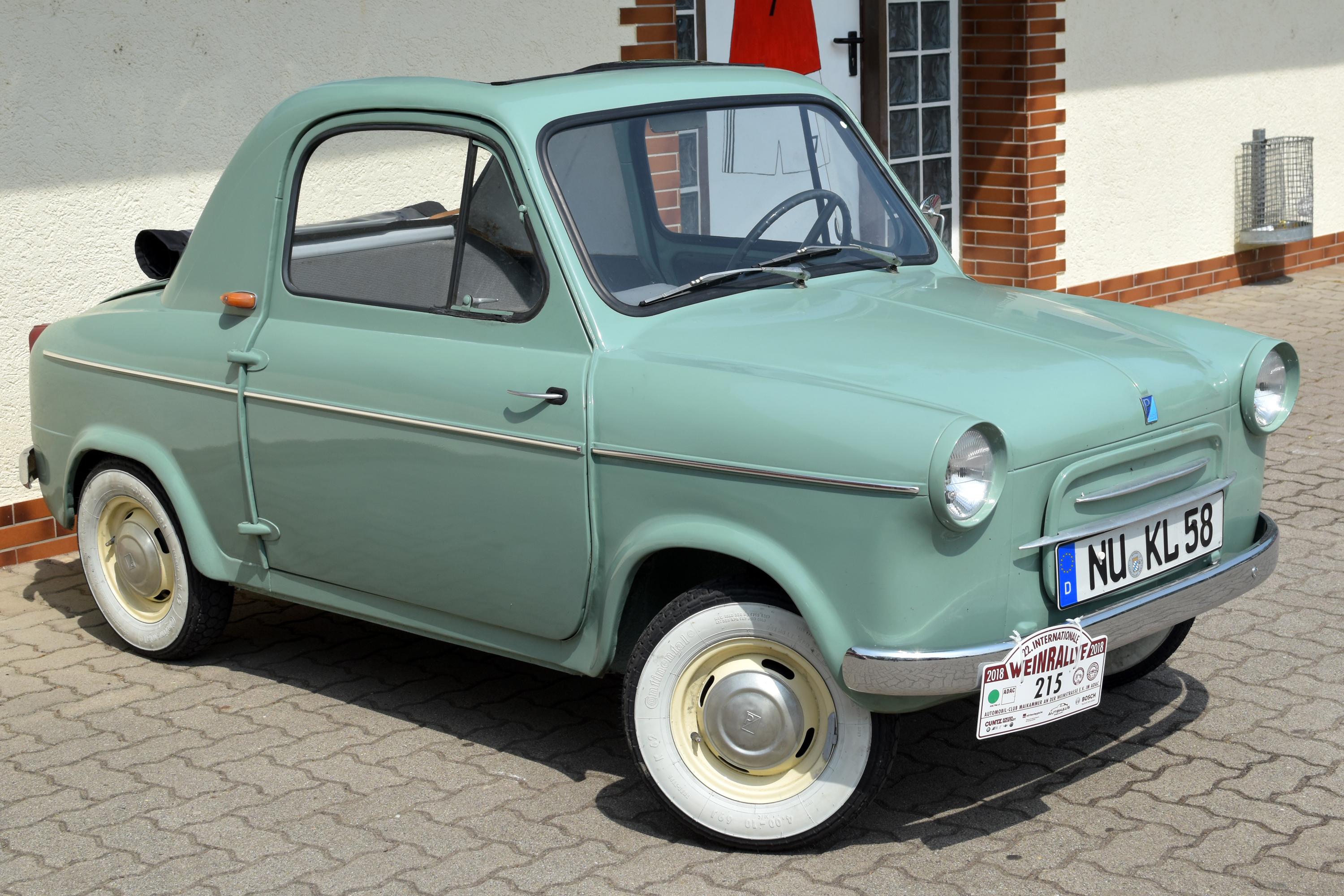
Vespa 400

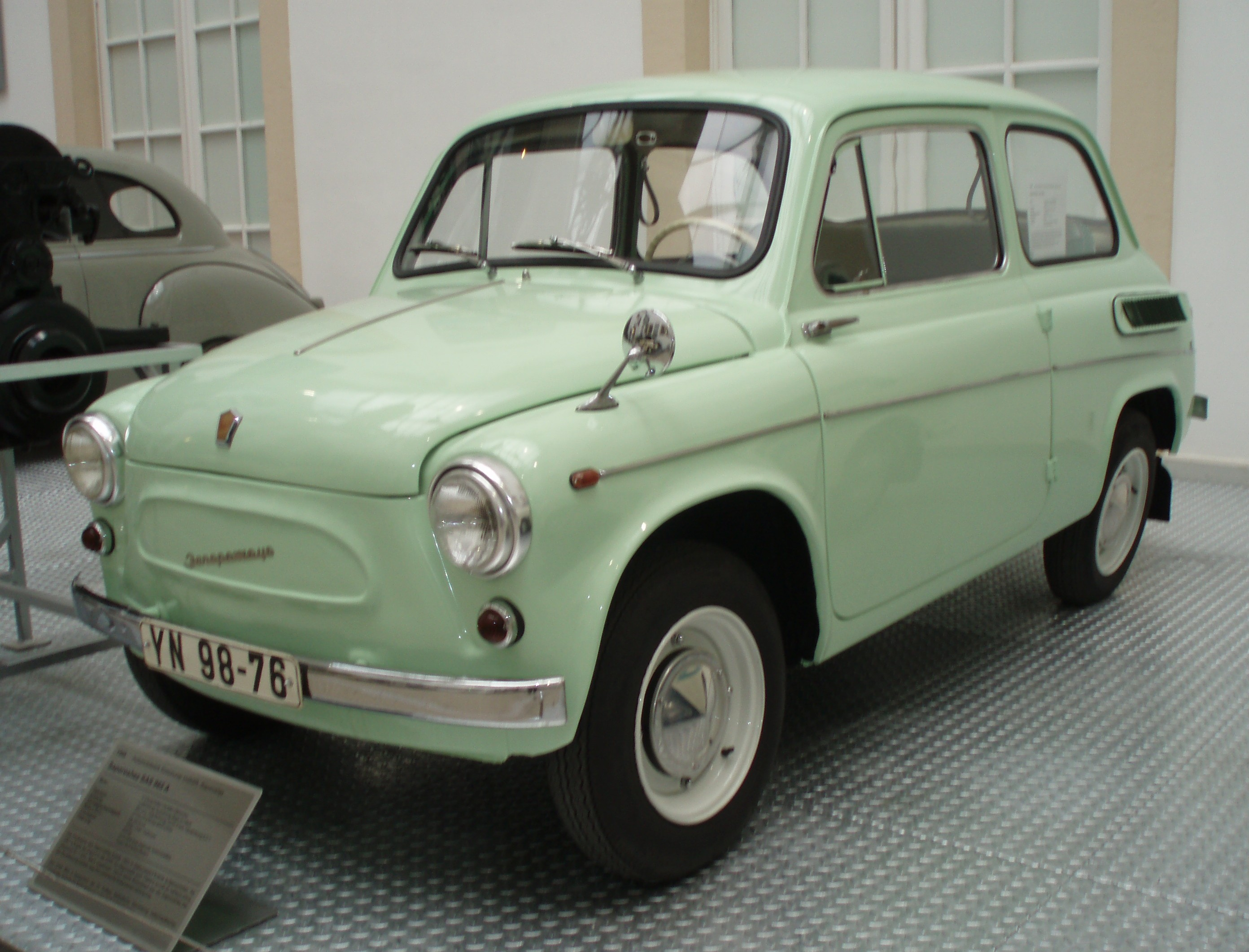
ZAZ Zaporozhets

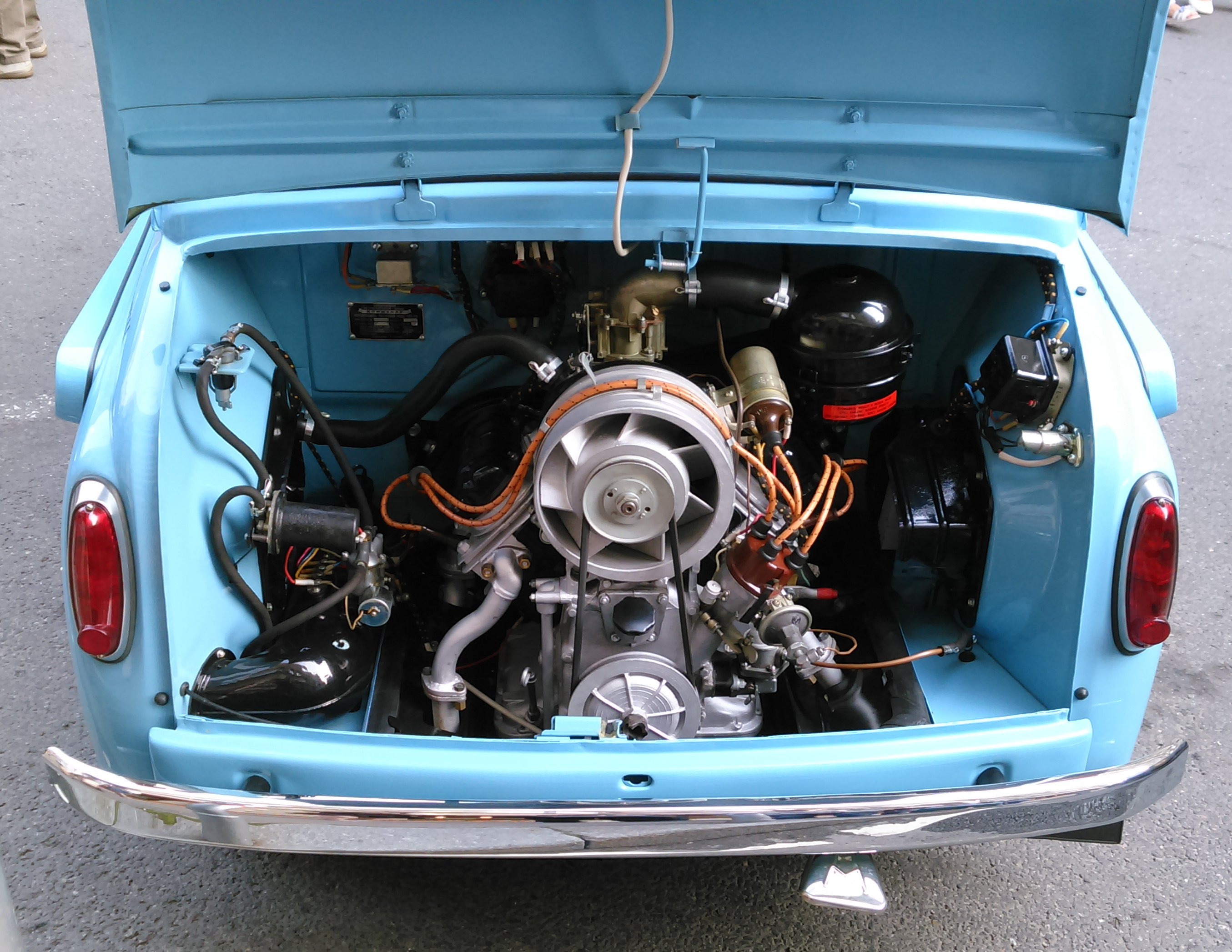
ZAZ Zaporozhets Engine

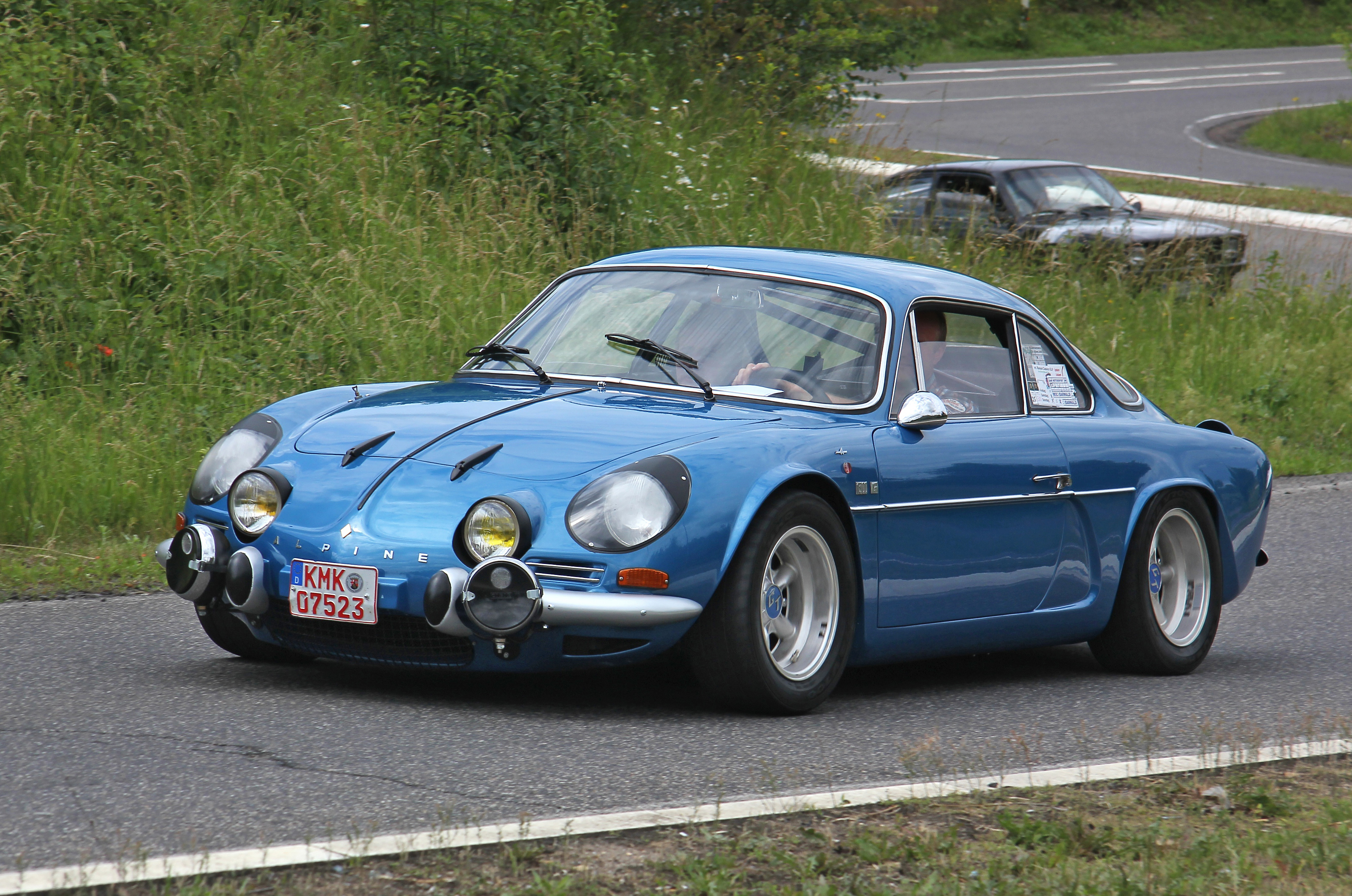
Alpine A110

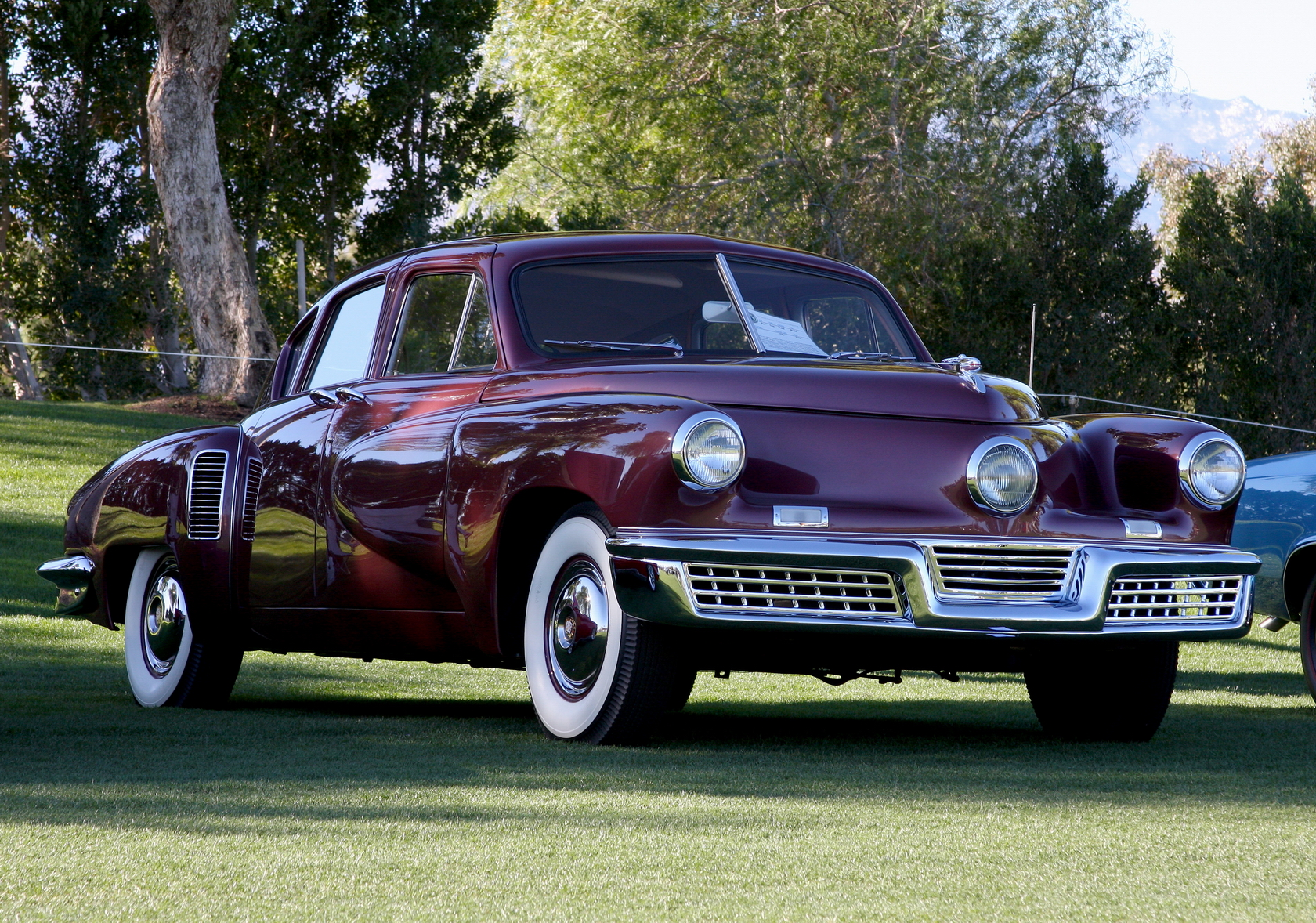
Tucker 48

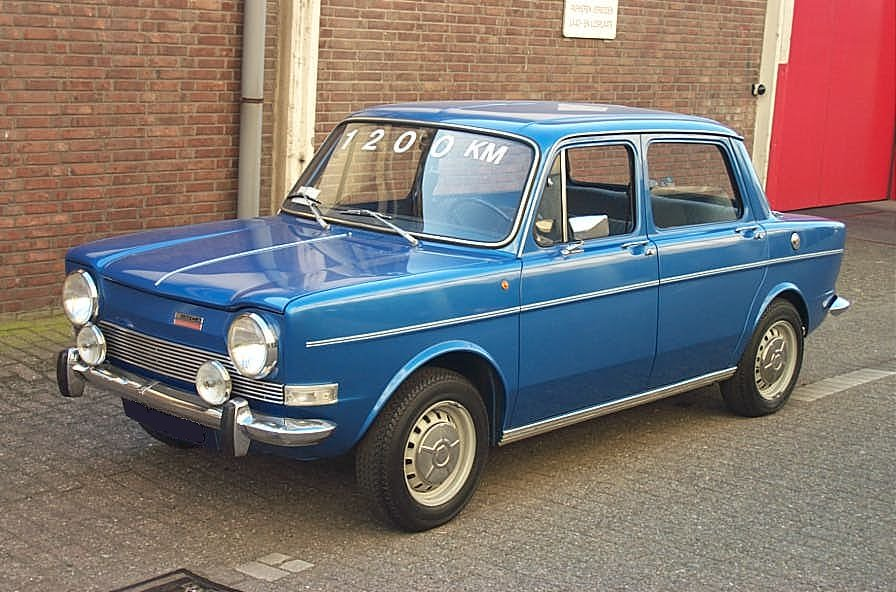
Simca 1000

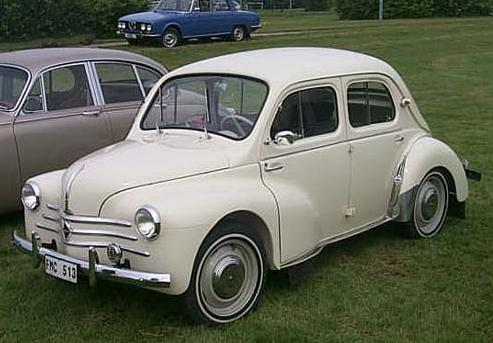
Renault 4CV

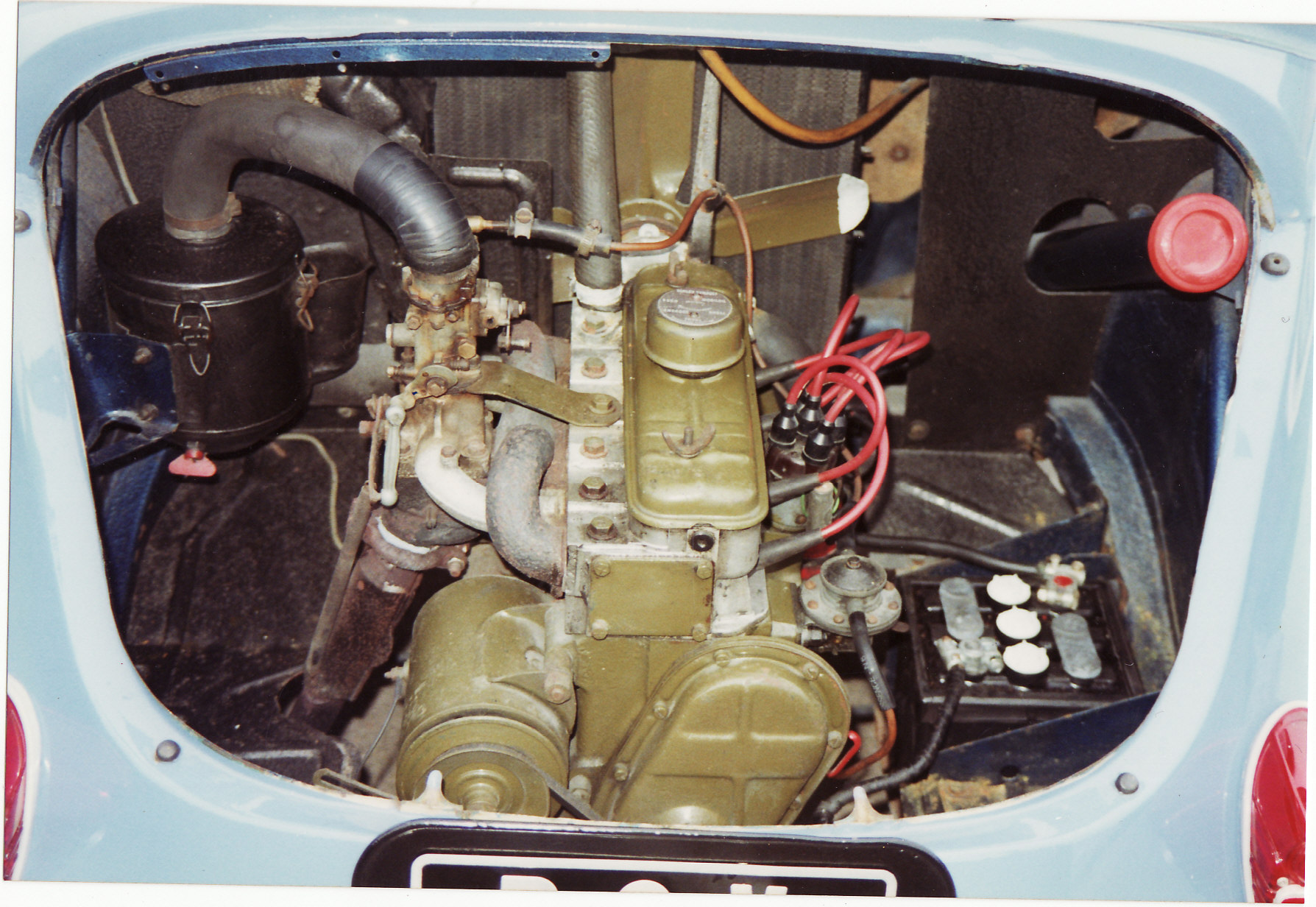
1960 Renault 4CV longitudinally-mounted rear engine (750 cc)

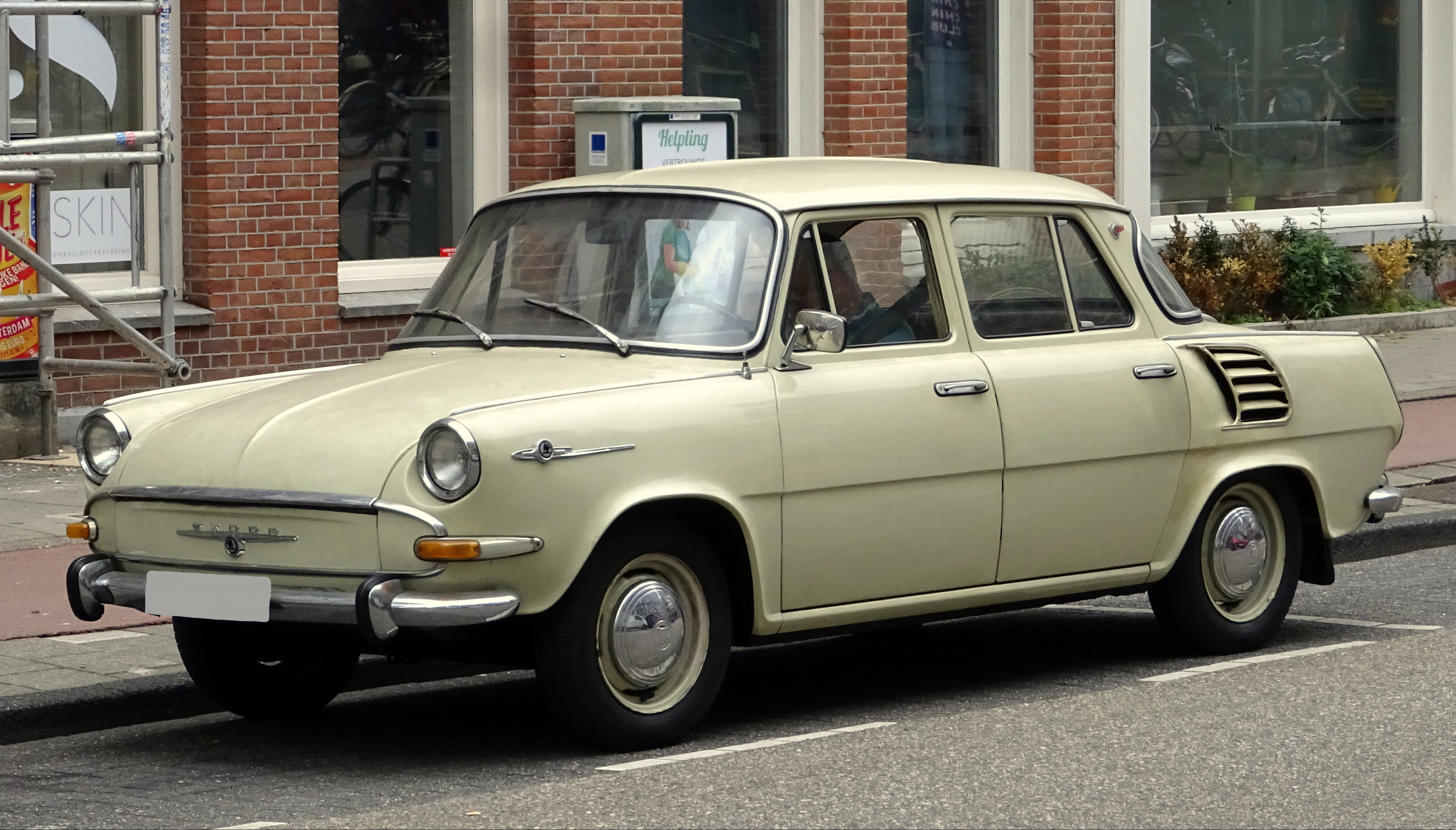
Škoda 1000 MB

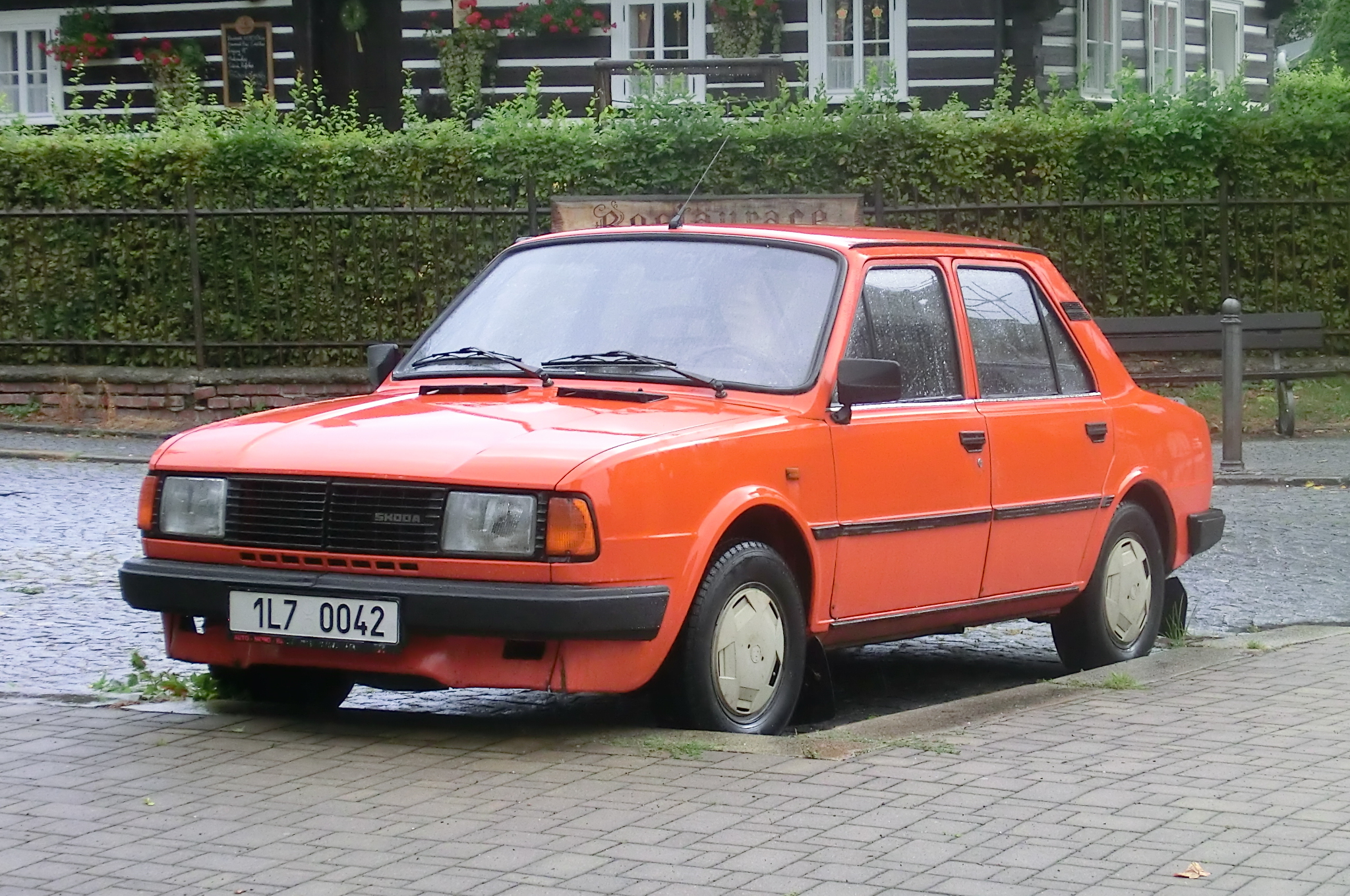
Škoda 120

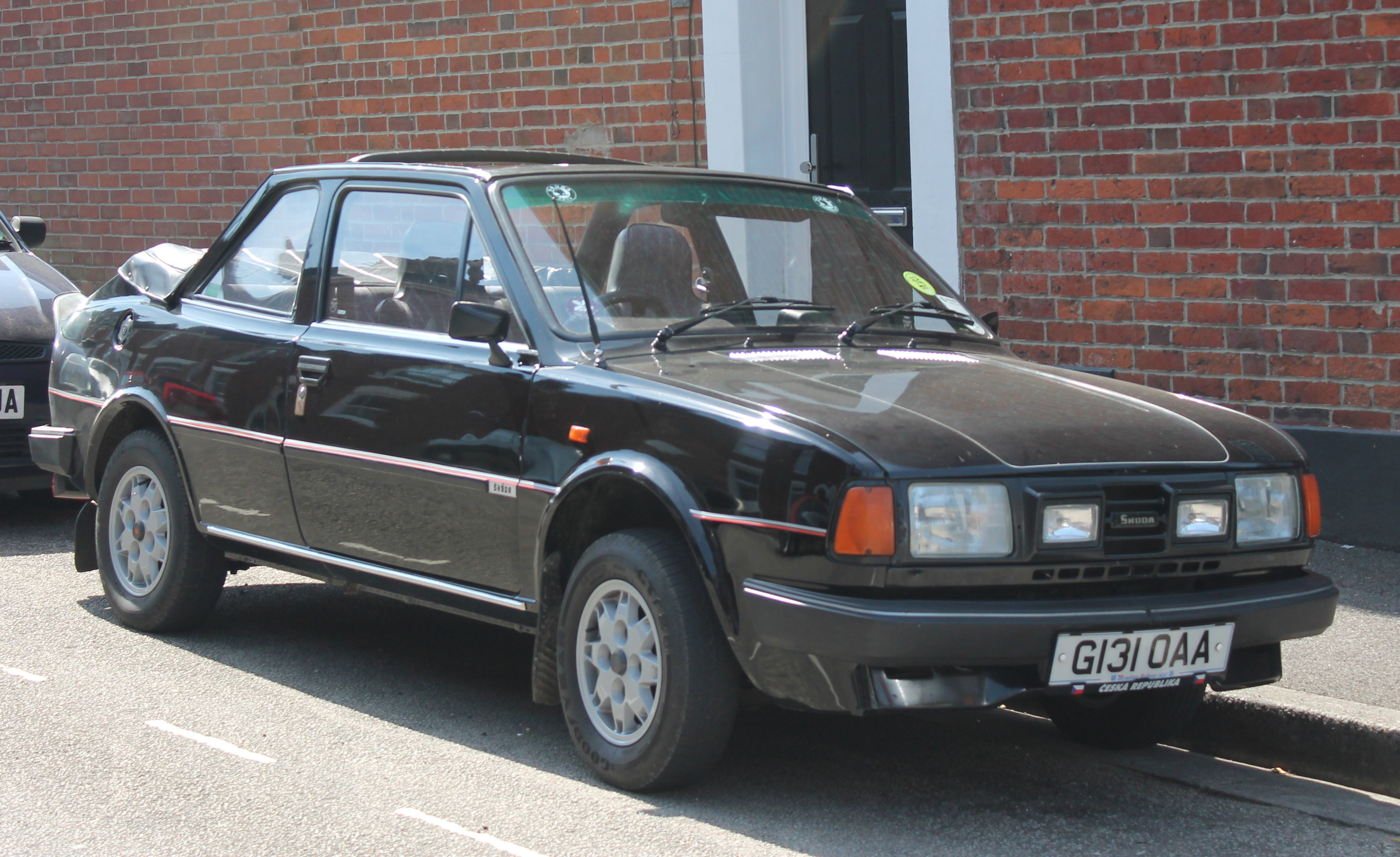
Škoda 136 Rapid

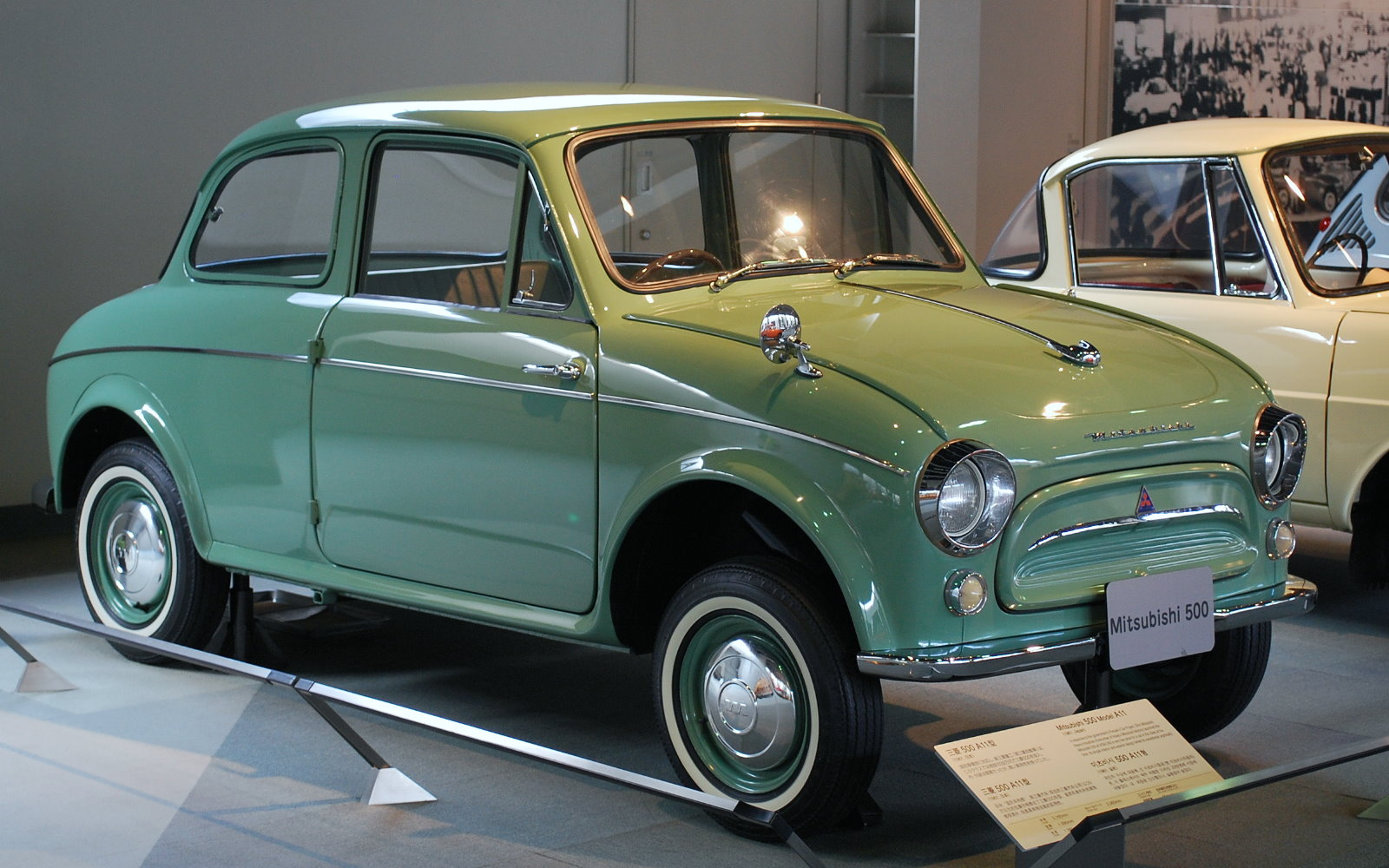
Mitsubishi 500

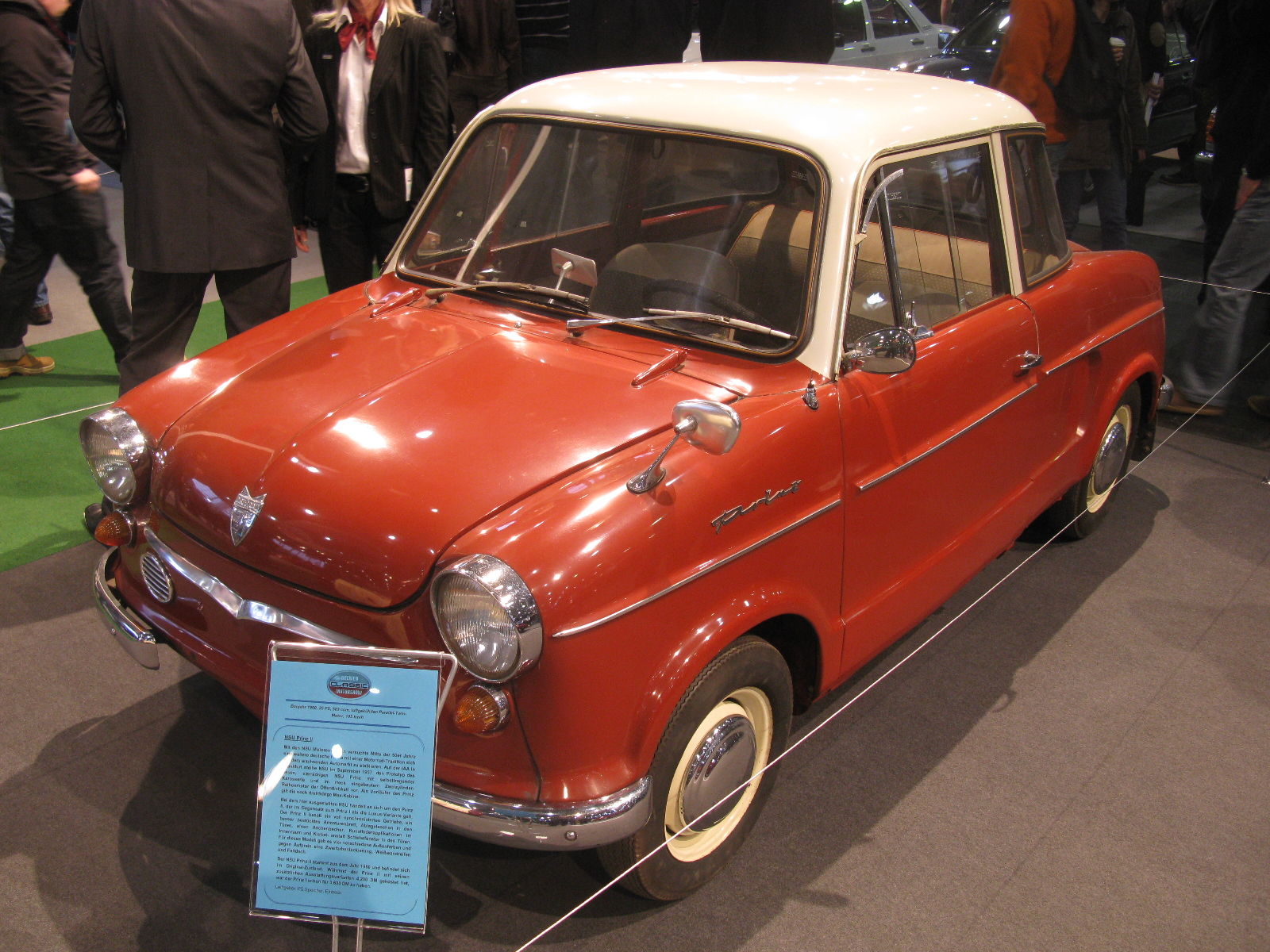
NSU Prinz 2

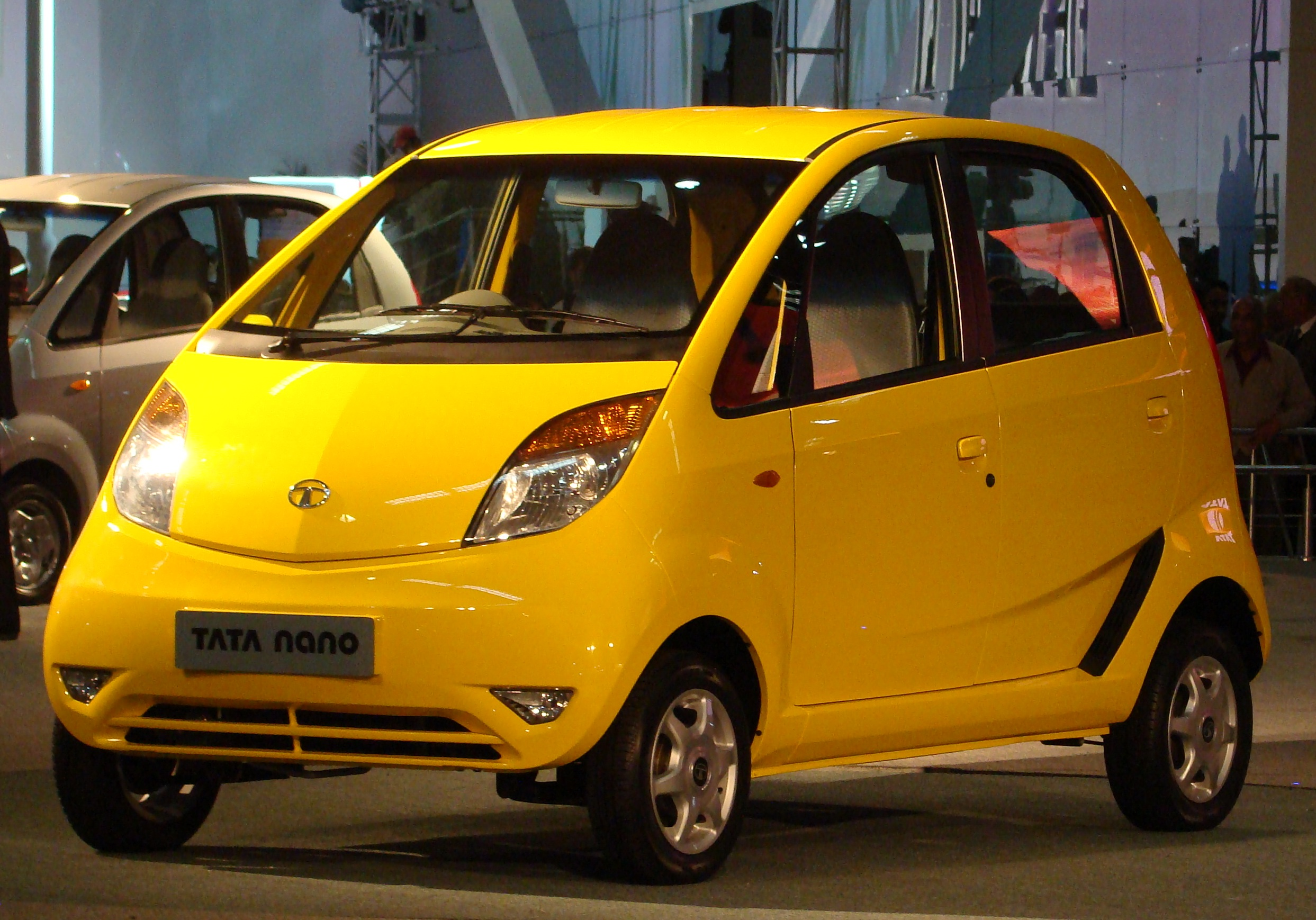
Tata Nano

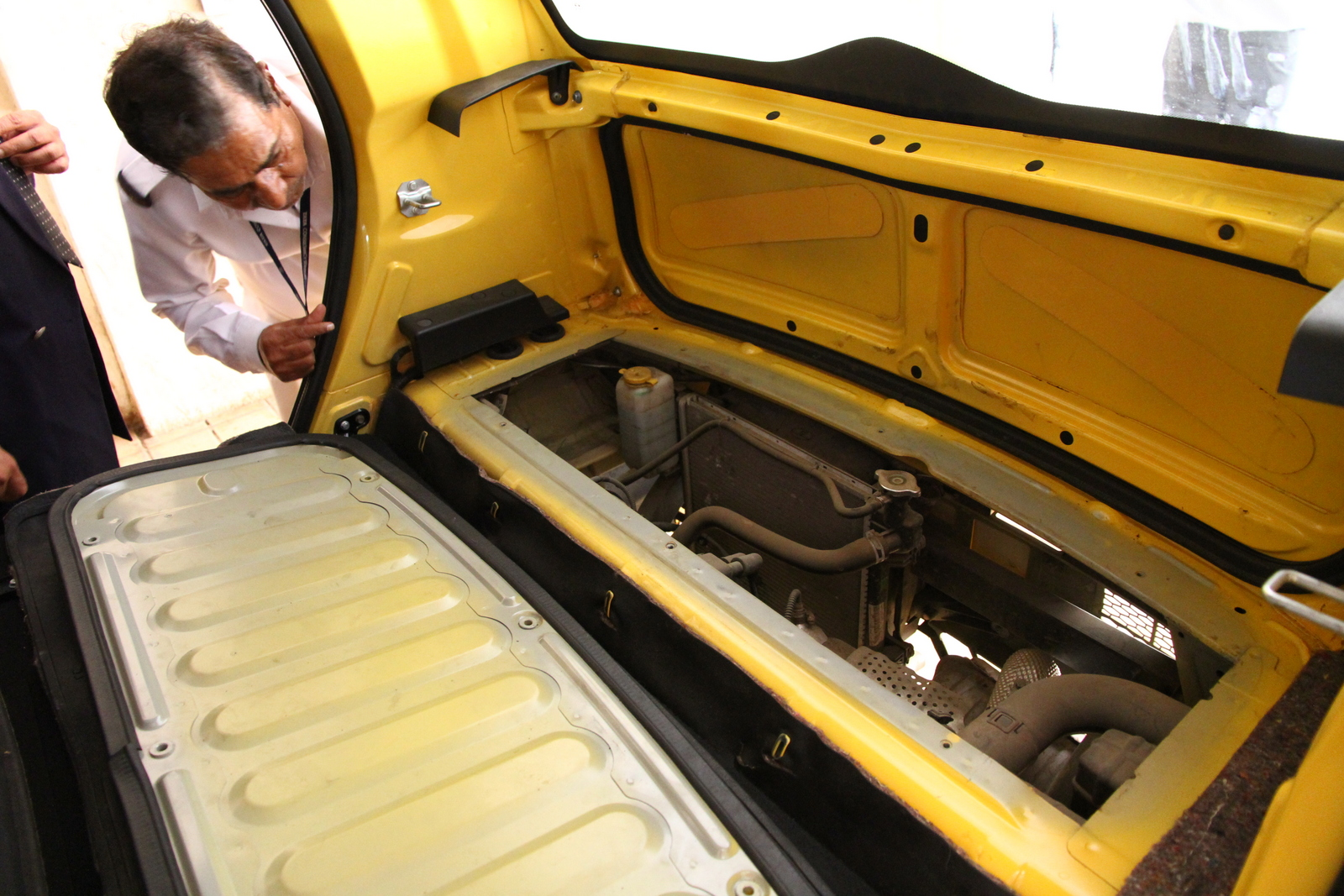
Tata Nano engine in trunk that is only accessible from inside as a cost reduction feature

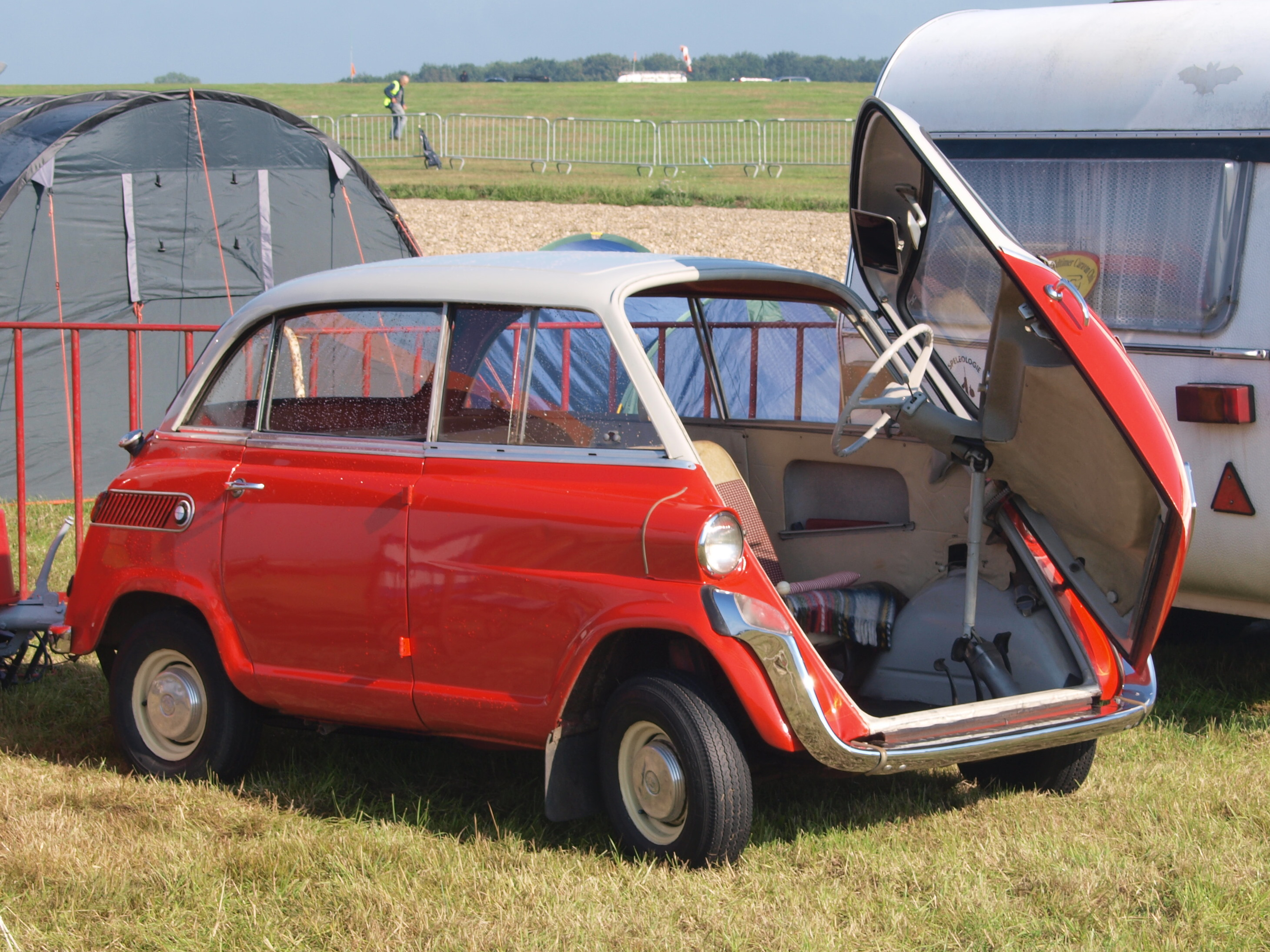
Front door open and side door in view on a BMW 600

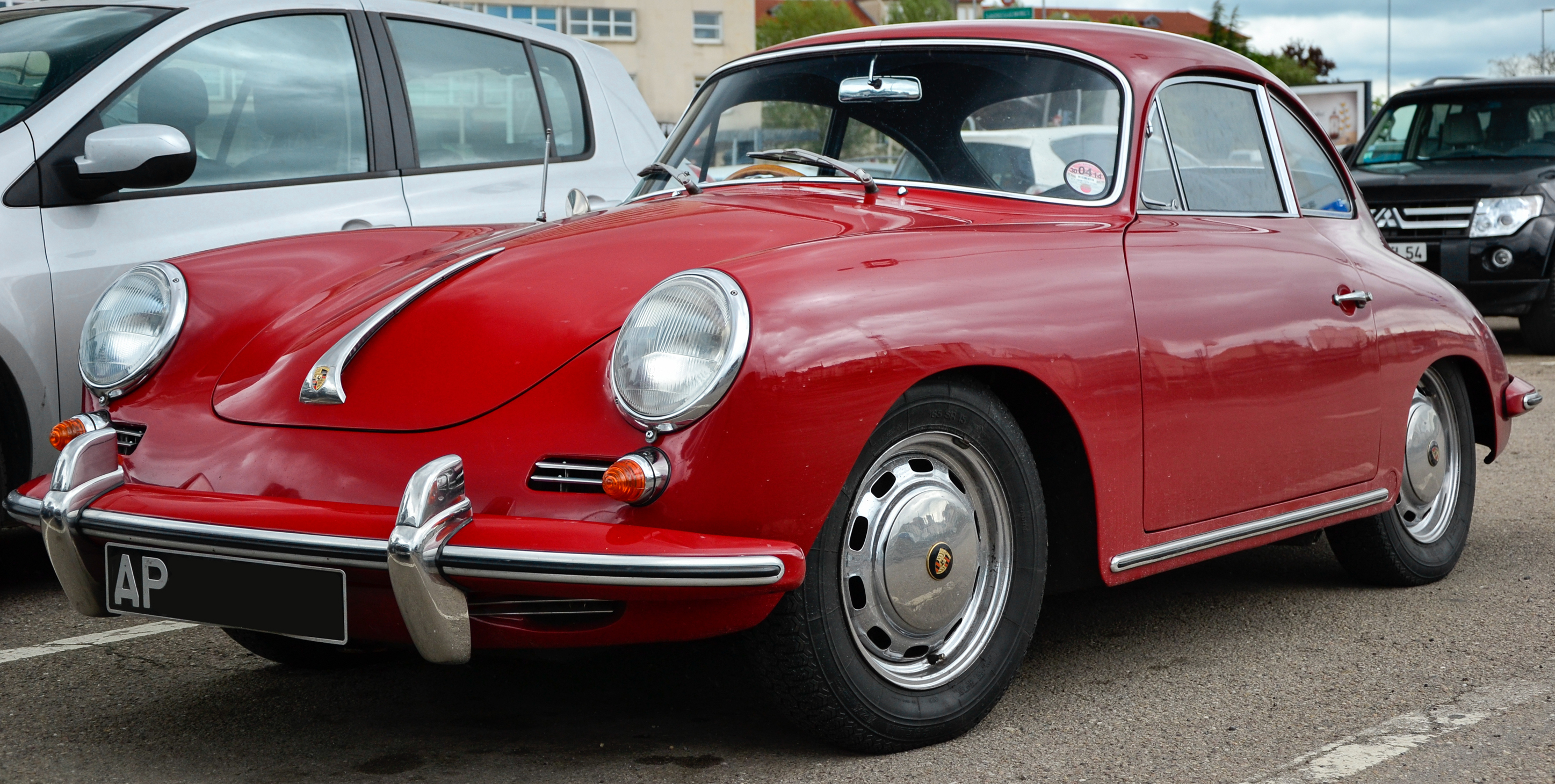
Porsche 356

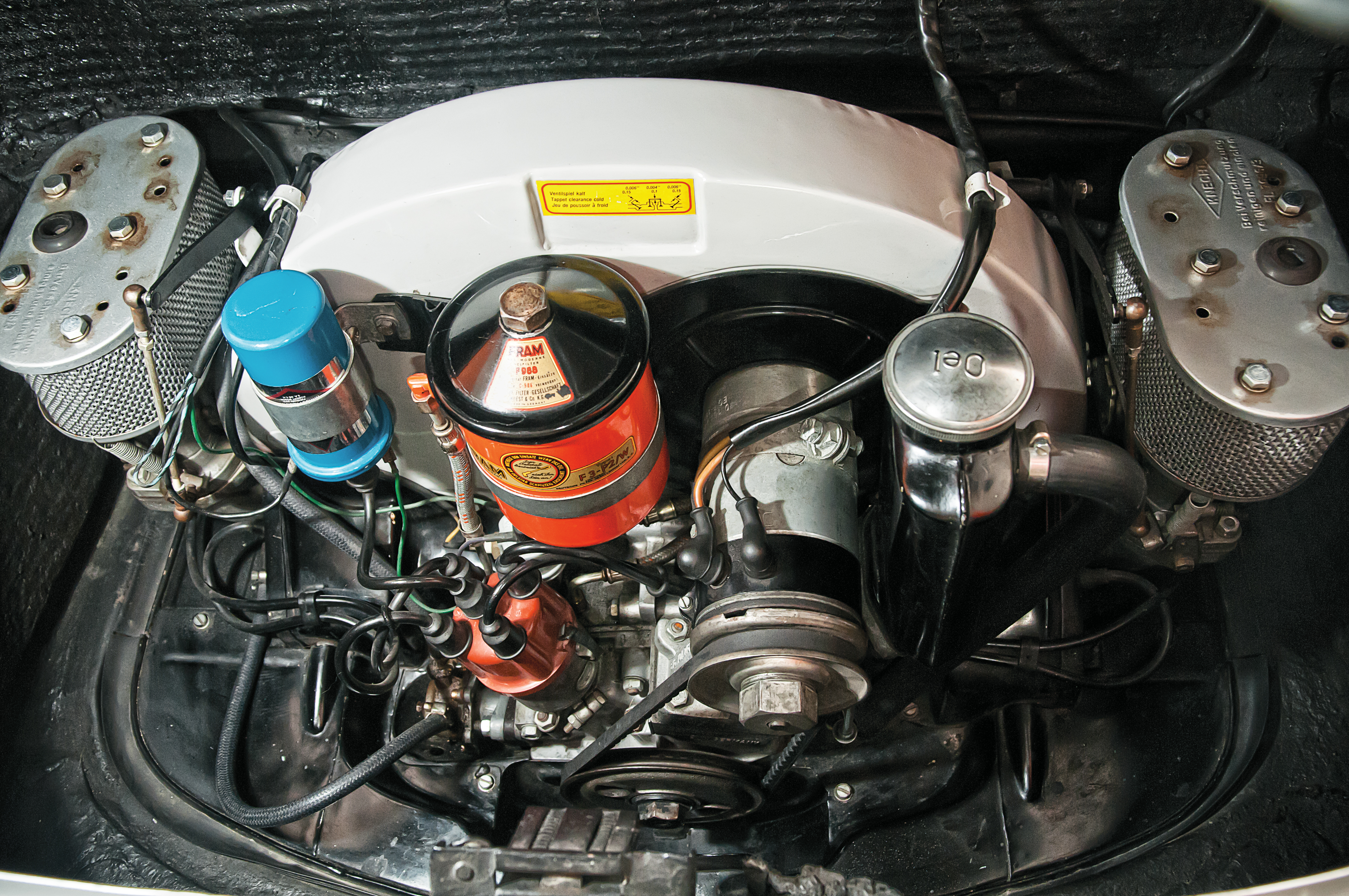
Porsche 356 engine layout shows VW ancestry

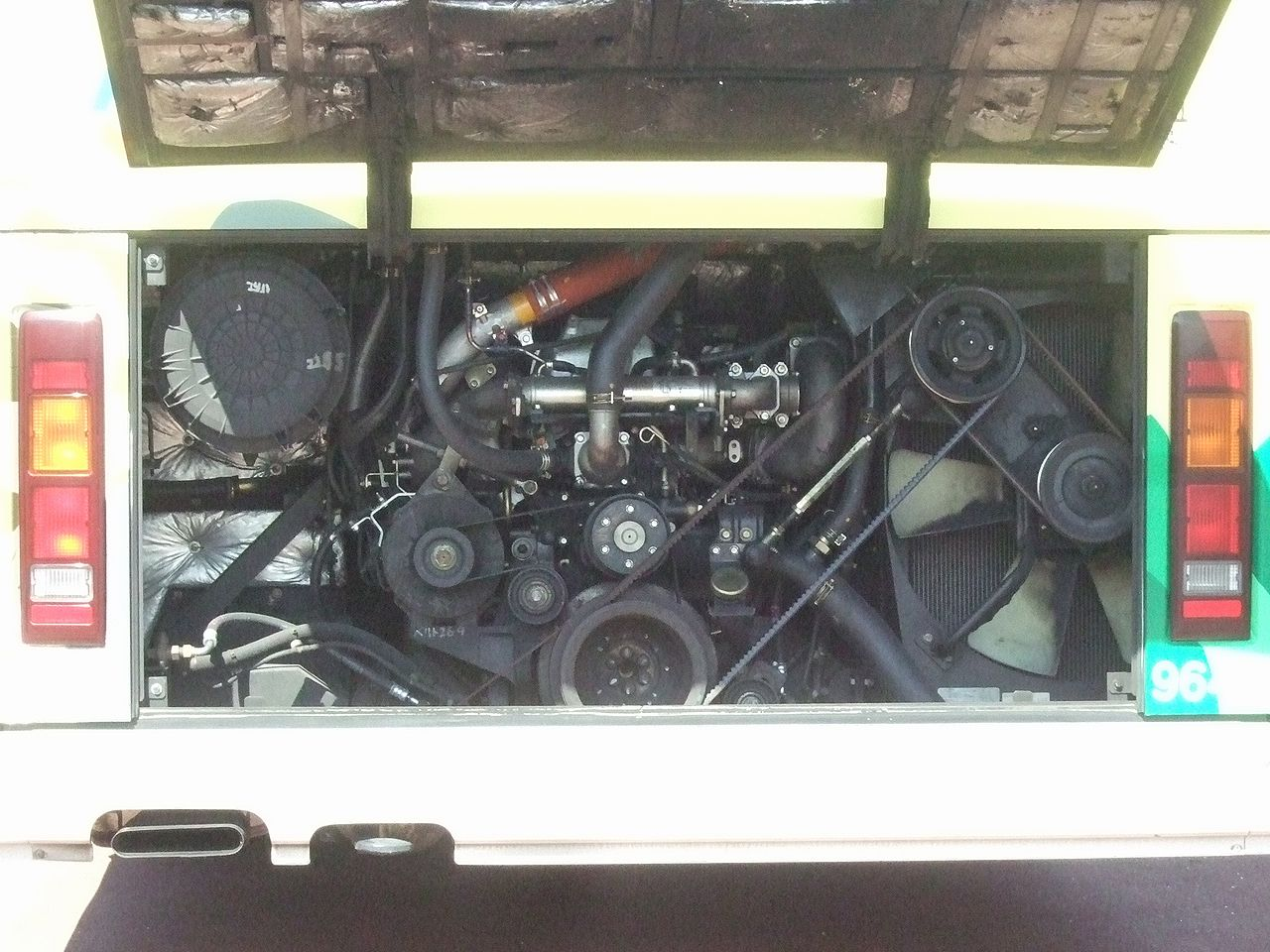
Engine room of Nissan Diesel Space Runner A

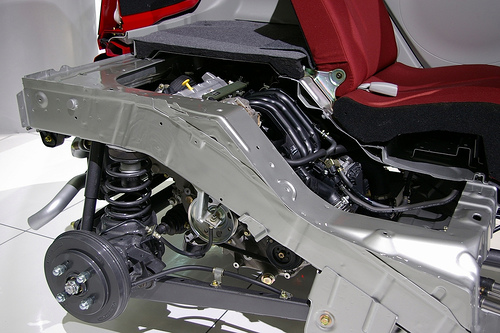
The engine of the Mitsubishi i

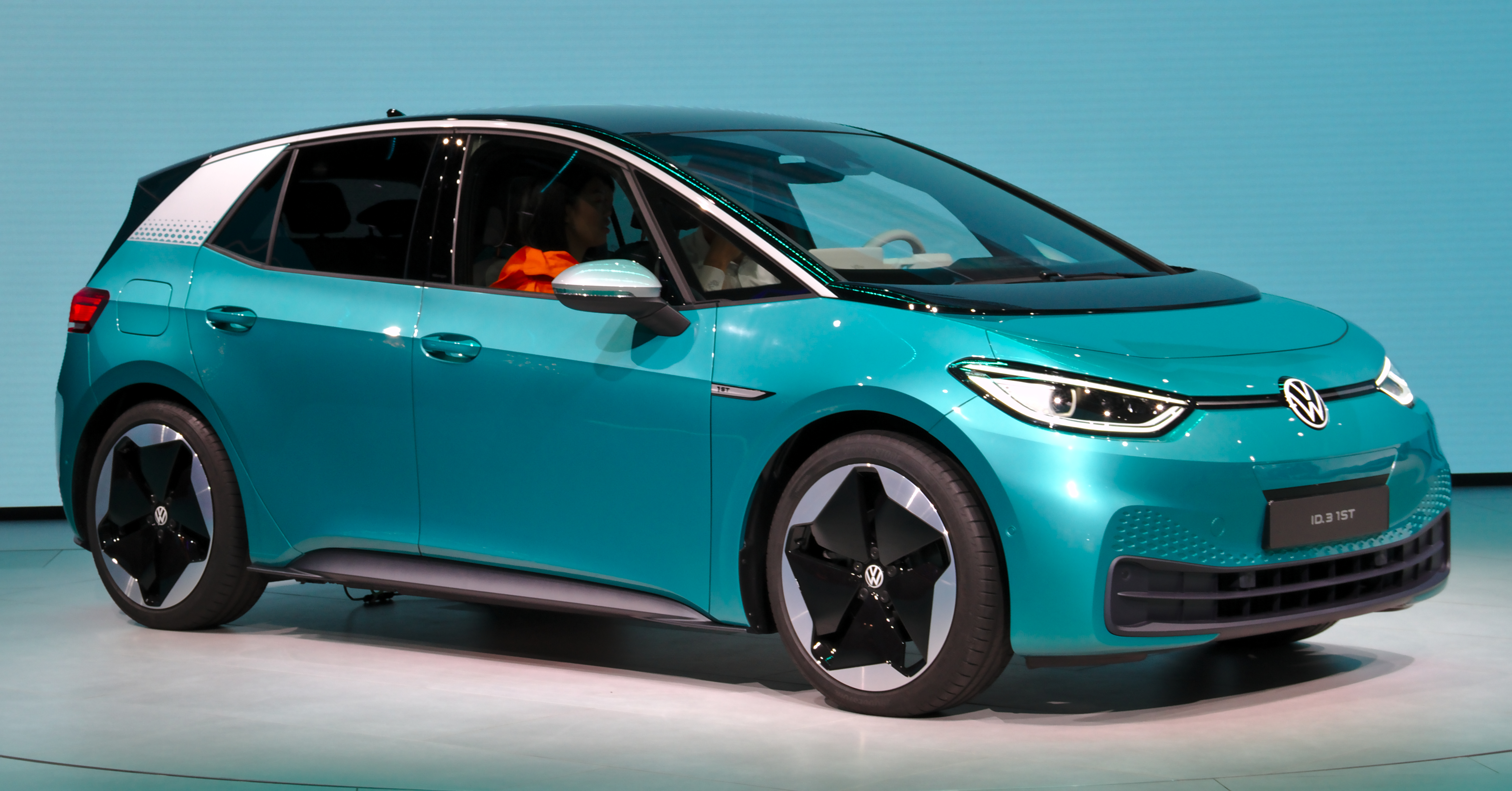
Volkswagen ID.3
