= Automotive industry in Japan =

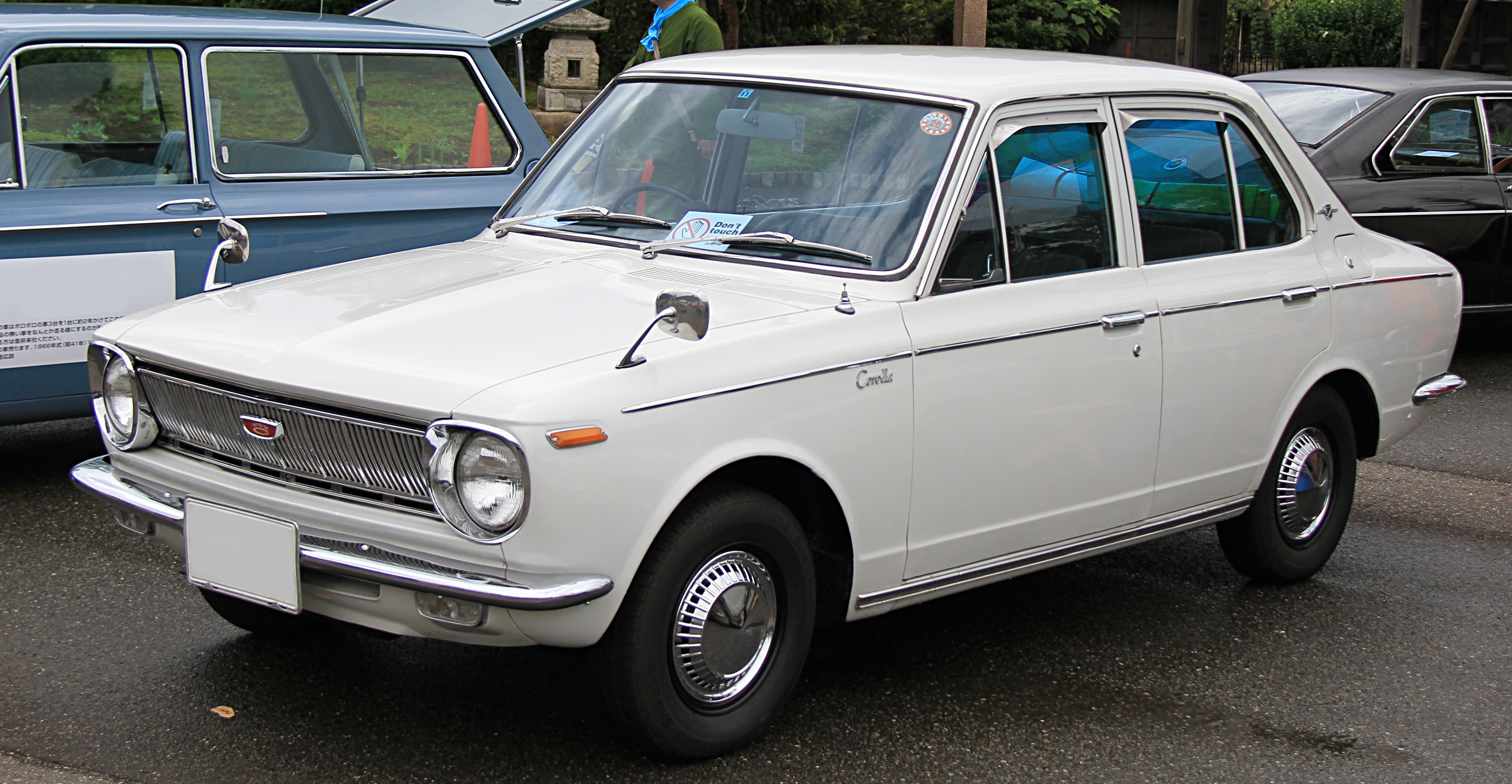
First generation Toyota Corolla (1966), the world's all-time best selling line of cars; in its 12th generation as of 2023

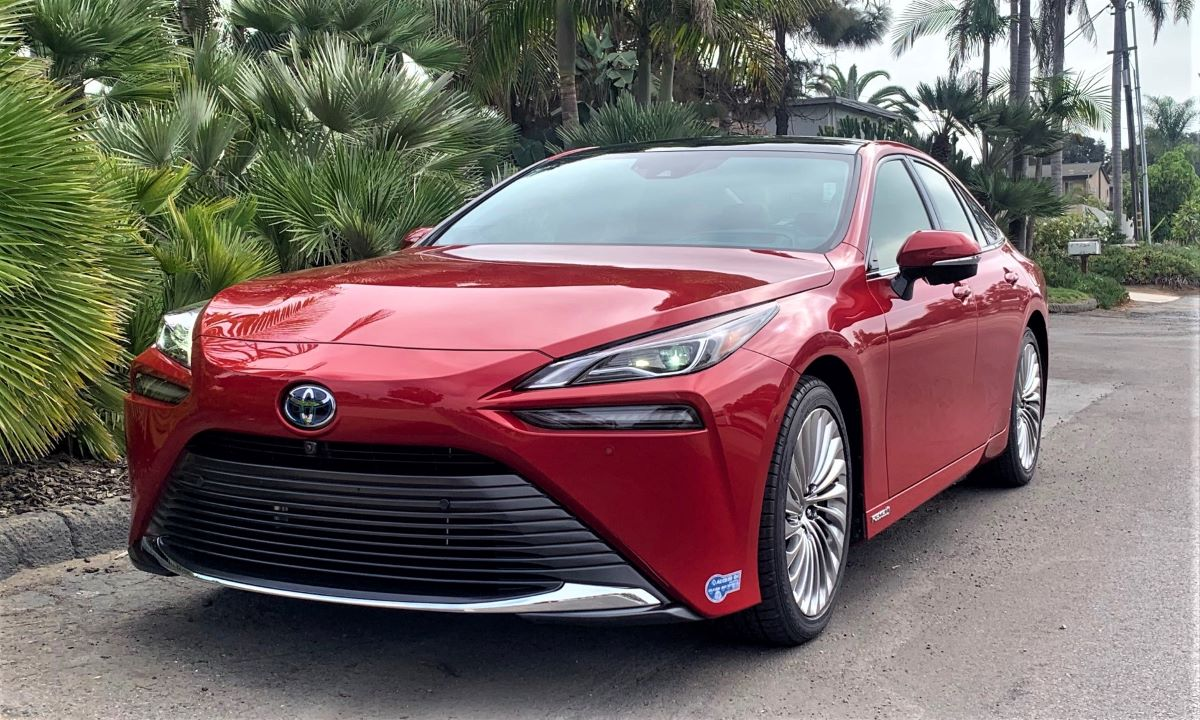
Toyota Mirai, Toyota's hydrogen-fueled vehicle

The automotive industry in Japan is one of the most prominent and largest industries in the world. Japan has been in the top three of the countries with the most cars manufactured since the 1960s, surpassing Germany. The automotive industry in Japan rapidly increased from the 1970s to the 1990s (when it was oriented both for domestic use and worldwide export) and in the 1980s and 1990s, overtook the U.S. as the production leader with up to 13 million cars per year manufactured and significant exports. After massive ramp-up by China in the 2000s and fluctuating U.S. output, Japan is currently the third largest automotive producer in the world with an annual production of 9.9 million automobiles in 2012. Japanese investments helped grow the auto industry in many countries throughout the last few decades.

Japanese business conglomerates began building their first automobiles in the middle to late 1910s. The companies went about this by either designing their own trucks (the market for passenger vehicles in Japan at the time was small), or partnering with a European brand to produce and sell their cars in Japan under license. Such examples of this are Isuzu partnering with Wolseley Motors (UK), Nissan partnering with British automaker Austin, and the Mitsubishi Model A, which was based upon the Fiat Tipo 3. The demand for domestic trucks was greatly increased by the Japanese military buildup before World War II, causing many Japanese manufacturers to break out of their shells and design their own vehicles. In the 1970s Japan was the pioneer in the use of robotics in the manufacturing of vehicles.

The country is home to a number of companies that produce cars, construction vehicles, motorcycles, ATVs, and engines. Japanese automotive manufacturers include Toyota, Honda, Daihatsu, Nissan, Suzuki, Mazda, Mitsubishi, Subaru, Isuzu, Hino, Kawasaki, Yamaha, and Mitsuoka. Infiniti, Acura, and Lexus/Century are luxury brands of Nissan, Honda and Toyota, respectively.

Cars designed in Japan have won the European Car of the Year, International Car of the Year, and World Car of the Year awards many times. Japanese vehicles have had worldwide influence, and no longer have the stigma they had in the 1950s and 1960s when they first emerged internationally, due to a dedicated focus on continual product and process improvement led by Toyota as well as the use of the Five Whys technique and the early adoption of the Lean Six Sigma methodology. Japanese cars are also built in compliance with Japanese government dimension regulations and engine displacement is further regulated by road tax bracket regulations, which also affects any imported cars sold in Japan.

== History ==
=== Early years ===
In 1904, Torao Yamaba produced the first domestically manufactured bus, which was powered by a steam engine. In 1907, Komanosuke Uchiyama produced the Takuri, the first entirely Japanese-made gasoline engine car. The Kunisue Automobile Works built the Kunisue in 1910, and the following year manufactured the Tokyo in cooperation with Tokyo Motor Vehicles Ltd. In 1911, Kaishinsha Motorcar Works was established and later began manufacturing a car called the DAT. In 1920, Jitsuyo Jidosha Seizo Co., founded by William R. Gorham, began building the Gorham and later the Lila. The company merged with Kaishinsha in 1926 to form the DAT Automobile Manufacturing Co. (later to evolve into Nissan Motors). From 1924 to 1927, Hakuyosha Ironworks Ltd. built the Otomo. Toyota, a textile manufacturer, began building cars in 1936. Most early vehicles, however, were trucks produced under military subsidy. Isuzu, Yanmar and Daihatsu initially focused on diesel engine development.

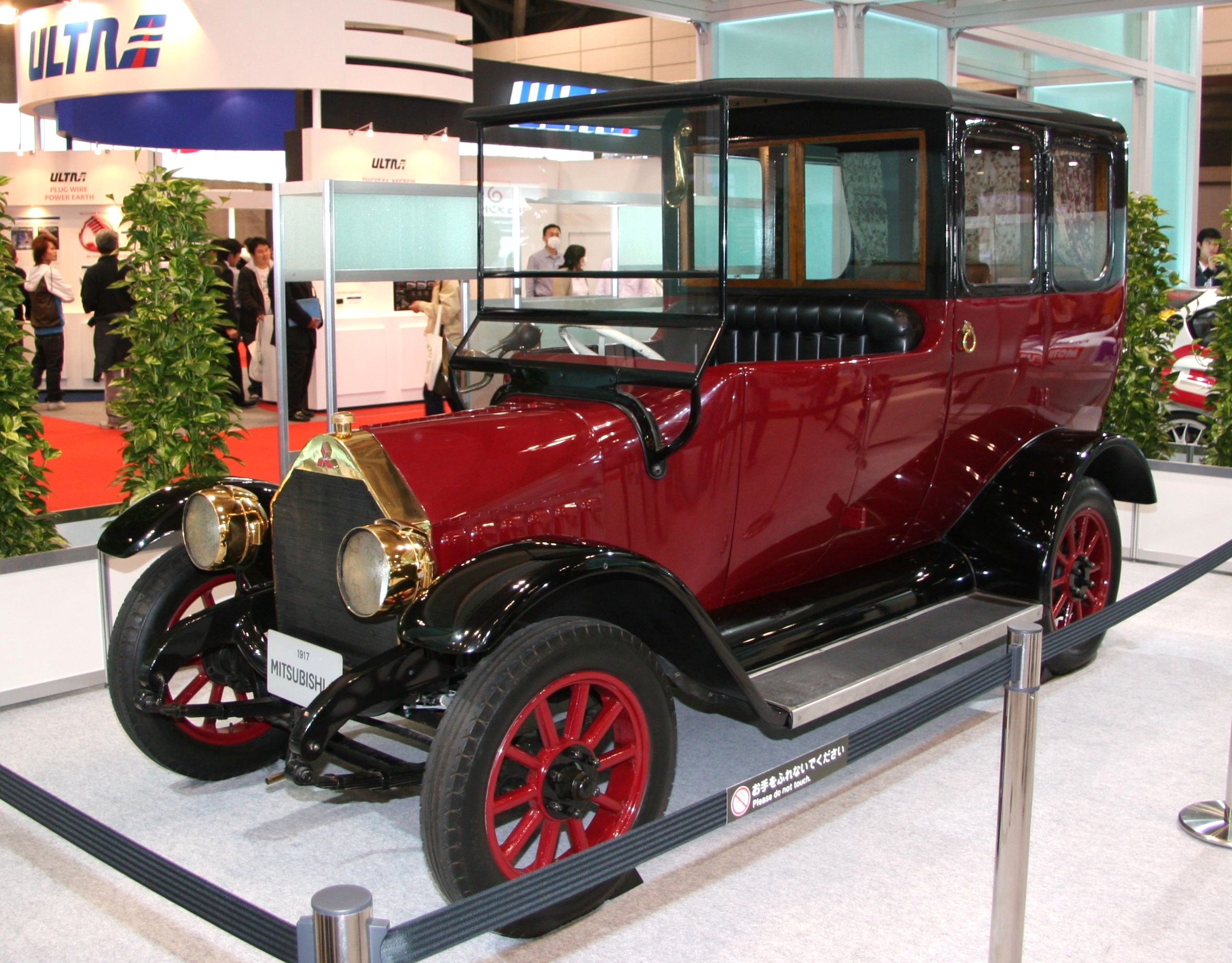
The Mitsubishi Model A was produced in 1917.

Cars built in Japan before World War II tended to be based on European or American models. The 1917 Mitsubishi Model A was based on the Fiat A3-3 design. (This model was considered to be the first mass-produced car in Japan, with 22 units produced.) In the 1930s, Nissan Motors' cars were based on the Austin 7 and Graham-Paige designs, while the Toyota AA model was based on the Chrysler Airflow. Ohta built cars in the 1930s based on Ford models, while Chiyoda and Sumida, a predecessor of Isuzu, built cars resembling General Motors products 1935 Pontiac, and 1930s LaSalle.

Automobile manufacture from Japanese companies was struggling, despite investment efforts by the Japanese government. The 1923 Great Kantō earthquake devastated most of Japan's fledgling infrastructure and truck and construction equipment manufacturing benefited from recovery efforts. Yanase & Co., Ltd. (株式会社ヤナセ Yanase Kabushiki gaisha) was an importer of American-made cars to Japan and contributed to disaster recovery efforts by importing GMC trucks and construction equipment. By bringing in American products, Japanese manufacturers were able to examine the imported vehicles and develop their own products.

Transportation and mobilization in the early 1900s was largely monopolized by the Japanese government's Ministry of Railways, and private automobile companies emerged to further modernize the transportation infrastructure.

From 1925 until the beginning of World War II, Ford and GM had factories in the country and they dominated the Japanese market. The Ford Motor Company of Japan was established in 1925 and a production plant was set up in Yokohama. General Motors established operations in Osaka in 1927. Chrysler also came to Japan and set up Kyoritsu Motors. Between 1925 and 1936, the United States Big Three automakers' Japanese subsidiaries produced a total of 208,967 vehicles, compared to the domestic producers total of 12,127 vehicles. In 1936, the Japanese government passed the Automobile Manufacturing Industry Law, which was intended to promote the domestic auto industry and reduce foreign competition; ironically, this stopped the groundbreaking of an integrated Ford plant in Yokohama, modeled on Dagenham in England and intended to serve the Asian market, that would have established Japan as a major exporter. Instead by 1939, the foreign manufacturers had been forced out of Japan. Under the direction of the Imperial Japanese government, the fledgling vehicle production efforts were redirected to heavy duty truck production due to the Second Sino-Japanese War and the Isuzu TX was the result of three Japanese companies combining efforts to manufacture a standardized, military grade heavy duty truck.

During World War II, Toyota, Nissan, Isuzu and Kurogane built trucks and motorcycles for the Imperial Japanese Army, with Kurogane introducing the world's first mass-produced four-wheel-drive car, called the Kurogane Type 95 in 1936. For the first decade after World War II, auto production was limited, and until 1966 most production consisted of trucks (including three-wheeled vehicles). Thereafter passenger cars dominated the market. Japanese car designs also continued to imitate or be derived from European and American designs. Exports were very limited in the 1950s, adding up to only 3.1% of the total passenger car production of the decade.

=== 1960s to today ===
In the 1960s Japanese manufacturers began to compete head-on in the domestic market, model for model. This was exemplified by the "CB-war" between the most popular compact sedans called the Toyota Corona and the Nissan Bluebird. While this initially led to benefits for consumers, before long R&D expenditures swelled and other companies offered competing compact sedans from Mazda, Subaru, Isuzu, Daihatsu and Mitsubishi. Towards the late 1980s and early 1990s Japanese automobile manufacturers had entered a stage of "Hyper-design" and "Hyper-equipment"; an arms race leading to less competitive products albeit produced in a highly efficient manner.

Due to the density and slow traffic speeds, automatic transmissions gradually became the norm, with manual transmissions being reserved for sports cars and other specialty vehicles. In 1989, 69.1 percent of new passenger cars (excluding keis and imports) were equipped with automatic transmissions. By 1998, this proportion had climbed to 87.7 percent.

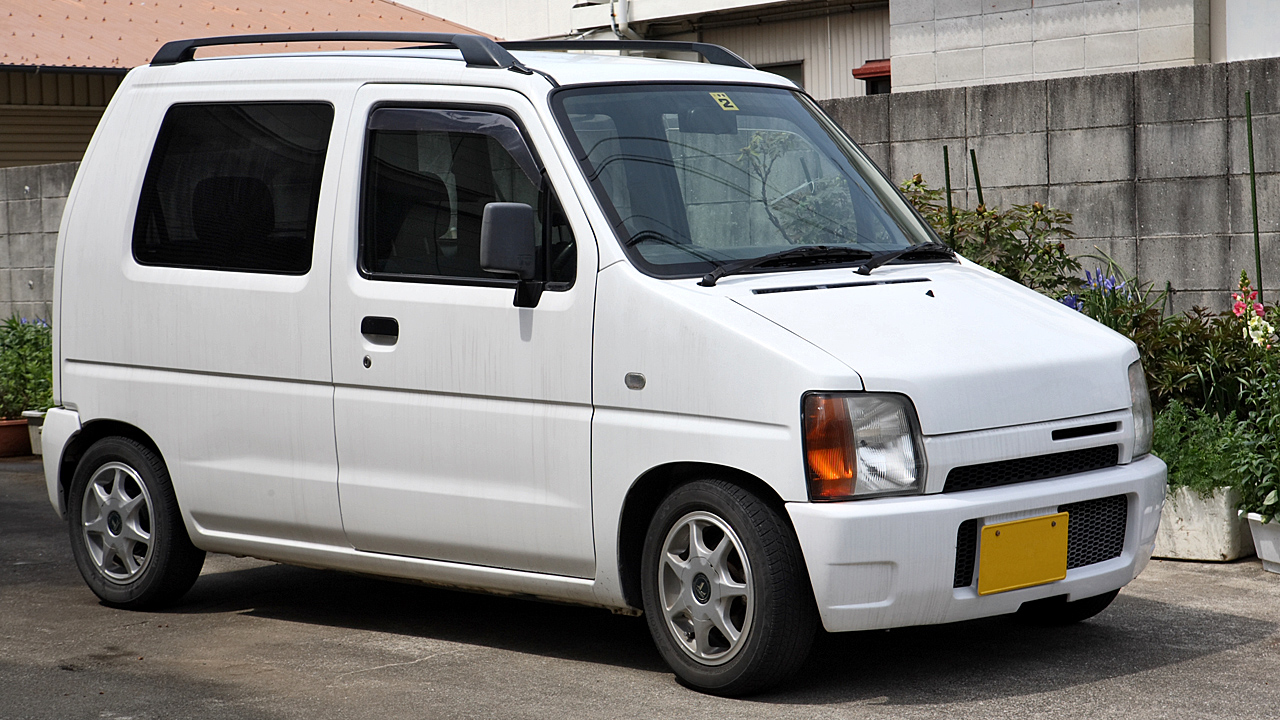
First Suzuki Wagon R, 1993, bestselling national kei class car

==== Market changes ====
During the 1960s, Japanese automakers launched a bevy of new kei cars in their domestic market; scooters and motorcycles remained dominant, with sales of 1.47 million in 1960 versus a mere 36,000 kei cars. These tiny automobiles usually featured very small engines (under 360cc, but were sometimes fitted with engines of up to 600cc for export) to keep taxes much lower than larger cars. The average person in Japan was now able to afford an automobile, which boosted sales dramatically and jumpstarted the auto industry toward becoming what it is today. The first of this new era, actually launched in 1958, was the Subaru 360. It was known as the "Lady Beetle", comparing its significance to the Volkswagen Beetle in Germany. Other significant models were the Suzuki Fronte, Daihatsu Fellow Max, Mitsubishi Minica, Mazda Carol, and the Honda N360.

The keis were very minimalist motoring, however, much too small for most family car usage. The most popular economy car segment in the sixties was the 700-800 cc class, embodied by the Toyota Publica, Mitsubishi Colt 800, and the original Mazda Familia. By the end of the sixties, however, these (often two-stroke) cars were being replaced by full one-litre cars with four-stroke engines, a move which was spearheaded by Nissan's 1966 Sunny. All other manufacturers quickly followed suit, except for Toyota who equipped their Corolla with a 1.1-litre engine - the extra 100 cc were heavily touted in period advertising. These small family cars took a bigger and bigger share of an already expanding market. All vehicles sold in Japan were taxed yearly based on exterior dimensions and engine displacement. This was established by legislation passed in 1950 that established tax brackets on two classifications; dimension regulations and engine displacement. The taxes were a primary consideration as to which vehicles were selected by Japanese consumers, and guided manufacturers as to what type of vehicles the market would buy.

==== Export expansion ====
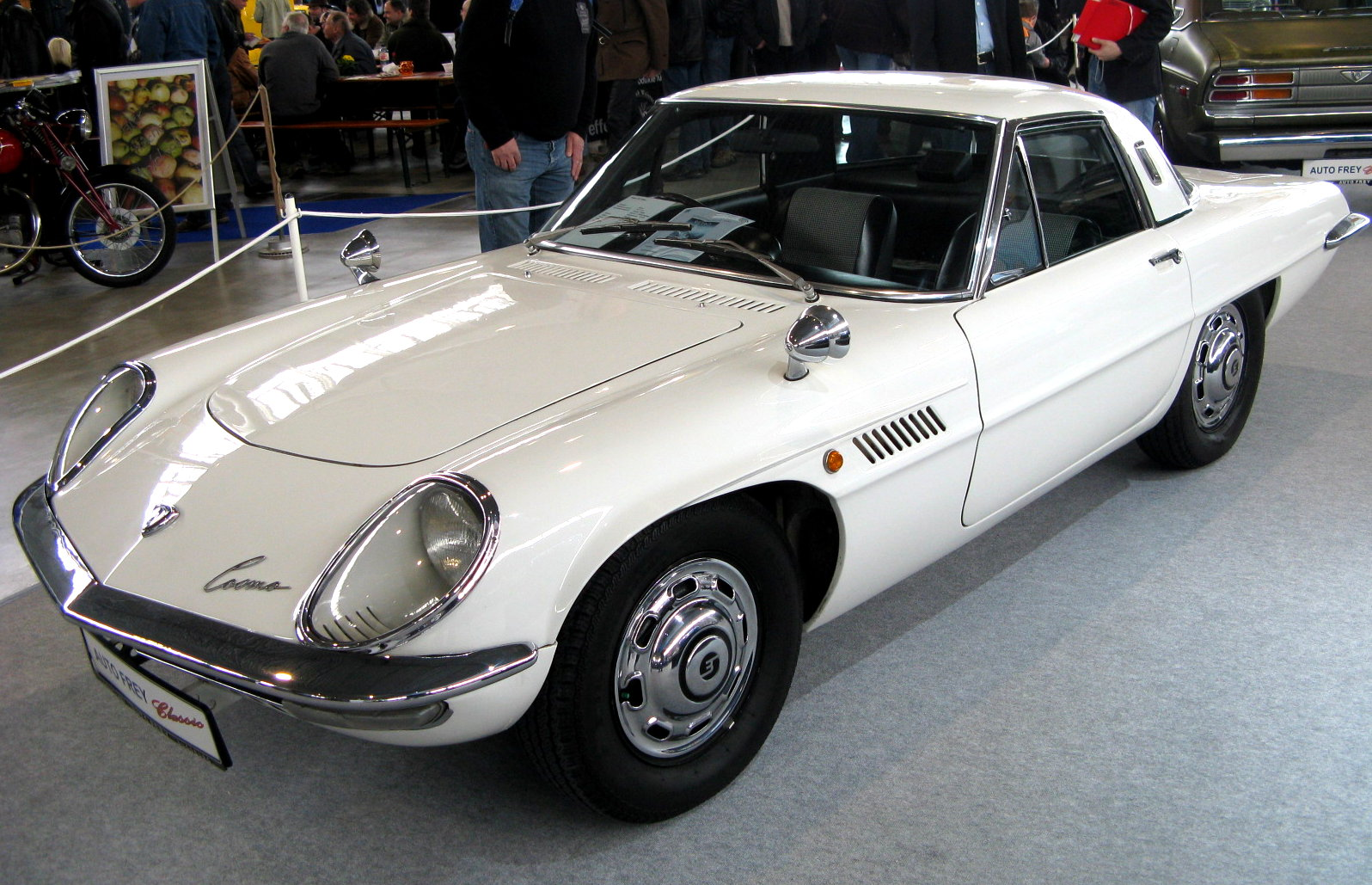
Mazda Cosmo, 1967, one of first two mass-produced cars with Wankel rotary engine

Exports of passenger cars increased nearly two hundred-fold in the sixties compared to the previous decade, and were now up to 17.0 percent of the total production. This though, was still only the beginning. Rapidly increasing domestic demand and the expansion of Japanese car companies into foreign markets in the 1970s further accelerated growth. The Japanese initially targeted Southeast Asia (after 1955), Australia (1960), and South Africa. They then began targeting the European market, at first specifically countries without their own car industry and with similar road conditions to Japan - entering Finland and Greece in 1962, adding the Netherlands and Denmark in 1963 and gradually expanding. After halting initial efforts in the United States, Toyota and Nissan developed specific models for that market in the mid-1960s and sales finally took off, with 1965 being a breakthrough year for both.

Effects of the 1973 Arab Oil Embargo accelerated vehicle exports along with the exchange rate of the Japanese yen to the U.S. Dollar, UK Pound, and West German Deutsche Mark. Passenger car exports rose from 100,000 in 1965 to 1,827,000 in 1975. Automobile production in Japan continued to increase rapidly after the 1970s, as Mitsubishi (as Dodge vehicles) and Honda began selling their vehicles in the US. Even more brands came to America and abroad during the 1970s, and by the 1980s, the Japanese manufacturers were gaining a major foothold in the US and world markets.

In the early 1970s, the Japanese electronics manufacturers began producing integrated circuits (ICs), microprocessors and microcontrollers for the automobile industry, including ICs and microcontrollers for in-car entertainment, automatic wipers, electronic locks, dashboard, and engine control. The Japanese automobile industry widely adopted ICs years before the American automobile industry.

Japanese cars became popular with British buyers in the early 1970s, with Nissan's Datsun badged cars (the Nissan brand was not used on British registered models until 1983) proving especially popular and earning a reputation in Britain for their reliability and low running costs, although rust was a major problem. Exports were successful enough that Japanese cars were considered a severe threat to many national car industries, such as Italy, France, the United Kingdom, as well as the United States. Import quotas were imposed in several countries, limiting the sales of Japanese-made cars to 3 percent of the overall market in France and 1.5 percent in Italy. As for the United States, the Japanese government was pressured to agree to annual export quotas beginning in 1981. In other countries, such as the United Kingdom, Japanese importers made gentlemen's agreements to limit import in an effort to forestall stricter official quotas. As a result, Japanese manufacturers expanded local production of cars, establishing plants across North America and Europe while also taking advantage of plants already created in third countries not covered by the quotas. Thus, South African-built Daihatsu Charades were sold in Italy and a number of Australian-made Mitsubishis found their way to North America and Europe.

==== World leader ====
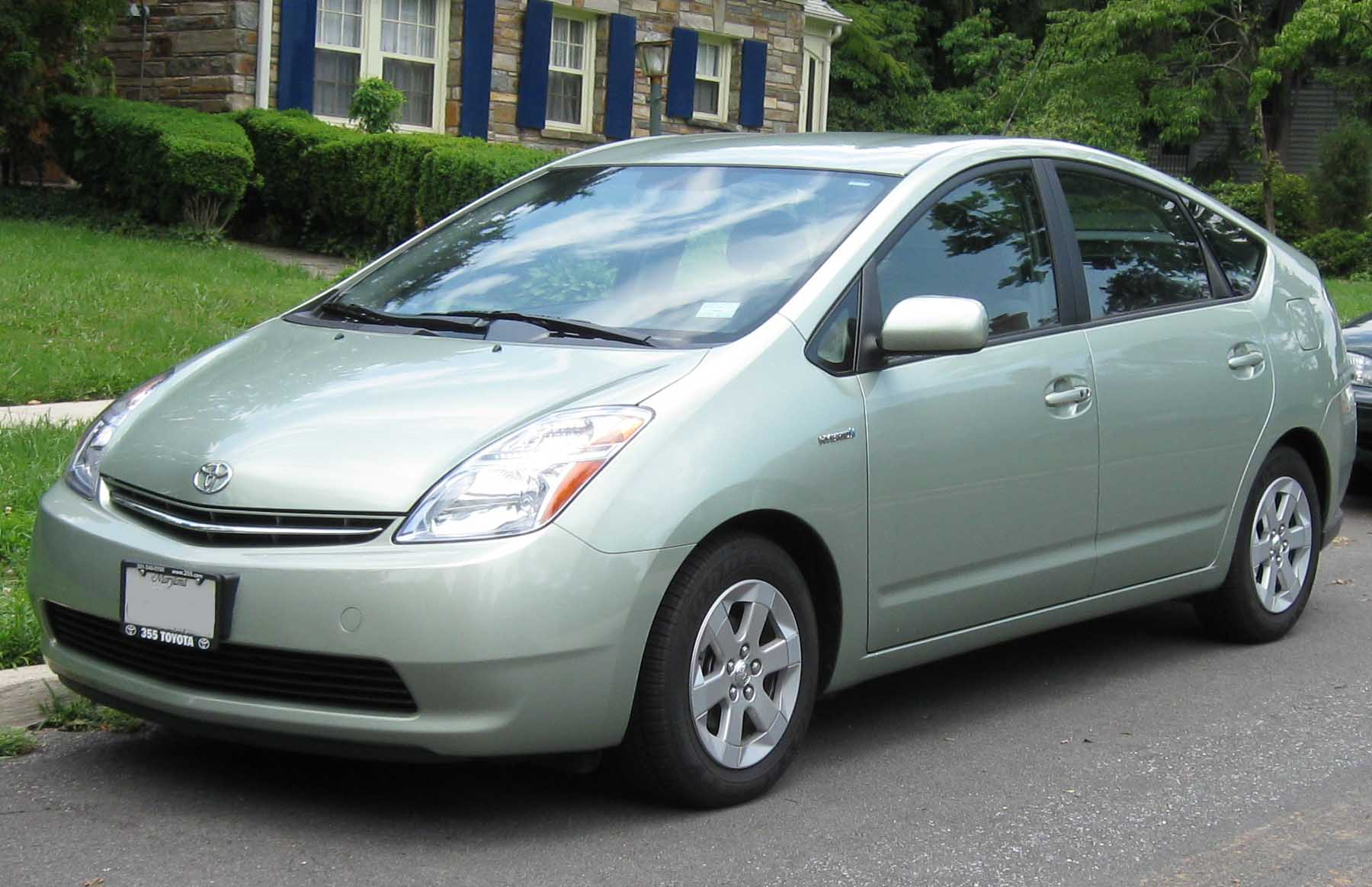
Toyota Prius, 2005 European Car of the Year, first and bestselling mass-produced hybrid car

With Japanese manufacturers producing very affordable, reliable, and popular cars throughout the 1990s, Japan became the largest car producing nation in the world in 2000. However, its market share has decreased slightly in recent years, particularly due to old and new competition from South Korea, China and India. Nevertheless, Japan's car industry continues to flourish, its market share has risen again, and in the first quarter of 2008 Toyota surpassed American General Motors to become the world's largest car manufacturer. Today, Japan is the third largest automobile market (below the United States and China) and is the second largest car producer in the world with its branded cars being among the most used ones internationally. Automobile export remains one of the country's most profitable exports and is a cornerstone of recovery plan for the latest economic crisis. In 2019 Japan was the second largest car exporter in the world.

== Timeline ==
- 1907 - Hatsudoki Seizo Co., Ltd. established
- 1911 - Kaishinsha Motor Car Works established
- 1917 - Mitsubishi Motors' first car
- 1917 - Nippon Internal Combustion Engine Co. Ltd. (integrated into Nissan) established as the small company Shūkōsha by Tetsuji Makita
- 1918 - Isuzu's first car
- 1920-1925 - Gorham/Lila - auto production established (merged into Datsun)
- 1924-1927 - Otomo built at the Hakuyosha Ironworks in Tokyo
- 1931 - Mazda-Go - by Toyo Kogyo corp, later Mazda
- 1934-1957 - Ohta begins auto production
- 1936 - Kurogane Type 95 world's first four-wheel-drive car manufactured
- 1936 - Toyota's first car (Toyota AA)
- 1952-1966 - Prince Motor Company (integrated into Nissan)
- 1953-1967 - Hino Motors starts auto production (merged into Toyota)
- 1954 - Subaru's first car (Subaru P-1)
- 1955 - Suzuki's first car (Suzulight)
- 1957 - Daihatsu's first car (Daihatsu Midget)
- 1963 - Honda's first production car (Honda S500)
- 1966 - One of the best selling cars of all time, the Toyota Corolla, is introduced; Nissan opens its first North American manufacturing facility in Cuernavaca, Mexico as Nissan Mexicana
- 1967 - Japan Automobile Manufacturers Association (JAMA) is founded
- 1967 - Mazda Cosmo was one of the first two mass-produced cars with Wankel rotary engine
- 1977 - Voluntary Export Restraints limit exports to the United Kingdom for five years; the deal was renewed until 1999
- 1980 - Japan surpassed the United States and became first in auto manufacturing; Nissan USA breaks ground for its Smyrna, Tennessee, manufacturing plant
- 1981 - Voluntary Export Restraints from May limit exports to United States to 1.68 million cars per year; redundant by 1990 as production inside US displaces direct exports; similar policies in several EU countries
- 1982 - Mitsuoka first car (BUBU shuttle 50)
- 1991 - Mazda HR-X was one of the first hydrogen (combined with Wankel rotary) car
- 1997 - Toyota Prius was the first mass-produced hybrid car
- 2004 - Mitsubishi defects cover-up scandal
- 2006 - Japan surpassed the United States and became first in auto manufacturing again.
- 2008 - Toyota surpassed General Motors to become the world's largest car manufacturer.
- 2008 - Automotive industry suffers due to the 2008 financial crisis and the Great Recession.
- 2009 - Japan was surpassed by China and became second in automotive manufacturing.
- 2010 - 2009–2010 Toyota vehicle recalls
- 2011 - March 2011 earthquake and tsunami and the Fukushima nuclear disaster affects Japanese automotive production for the second time.
- 2012 - Abenomics from 2012 to 2020, Prime Minister Shinzo Abe's program to help the country's economic recovery, led to a weakened yen and helped the country's automotive industry.
- 2020 - COVID-19 pandemic affects Japanese automotive production.

== Statistics ==
=== Production volumes in Japan by manufacturer ===
The following are vehicle production volumes for Japanese vehicle manufacturers in Japan, according to the Japan Automobile Manufacturers Association (JAMA).

Passenger cars
Manufacturer	2007	2008	2009	2010	2011	2012	2022
Toyota	3,849,353	3,631,146	2,543,715	2,993,714	2,473,546	3,170,000	2,656,009
Suzuki	1,061,767	1,059,456	758,057	915,391	811,689	896,781	919,891
Daihatsu	648,289	641,322	551,275	534,586	479,956	633,887	869,161
Mazda	952,290	1,038,725	693,598	893,323	798,060	830,294	734,833
Honda	1,288,577	1,230,621	812,298	941,558	687,948	996,832	643,973
Subaru	403,428	460,515	357,276	437,443	366,518	551,812	562,601
Nissan	982,870	1,095,661	780,495	1,008,160	1,004,666	1,035,726	559,314
Mitsubishi	758,038	770,667	365,447	586,187	536,142	448,598	440,762
Other	25	30	0	0	0	0	-
Total	9,944,637	9,928,143	6,862,161	8,310,362	7,158,525	8,554,219	7,386,544

Trucks
Manufacturer	2007	2008	2009
Toyota	291,008	271,544	178,954
Suzuki	156,530	158,779	150,245
Daihatsu	138,312	151,935	132,980
Isuzu	236,619	250,692	118,033
Nissan	188,788	189,005	109,601
Mitsubishi	88,045	83,276	61,083
Hino	101,909	101,037	62,197
Subaru	72,422	64,401	51,123
Mitsubishi Fuso	131,055	115,573	49,485
Honda	43,268	33,760	28,626
Mazda	43,221	39,965	23,577
UD Trucks	44,398	45,983	18,652
Other	2,445	2,449	545
Total	1,538,020	1,508,399	985,101

Buses
Manufacturer	2007	2008	2009
Toyota	85,776	109,698	69,605
Mitsubishi Fuso	10,225	10,611	4,982
Nissan	7,422	8,416	4,479
Hino	4,984	5,179	4,473
Isuzu	3,668	3,221	2,077
UD Trucks	1,595	1,977	1,179
Total	113,670	139,102	86,795

== Sales rank ==
=== Regular cars ===
Top 10 best-selling automobile models in Japan by nameplate (Note: Japan Automobile Dealers Association (JADA) grouped vehicle sales by nameplate, which means different models with the same nameplate such as the Toyota Yaris and Toyota Yaris Cross or the Daihatsu Mira and Daihatsu Mira Gino are counted as a single model.) (excluding kei vehicles and commercial vehicles), 1990–2025 Source:
Year	Models and Ranking									
Year	1st	2nd	3rd	4th	5th	6th	7th	8th	9th	10th
1990	Toyota Corolla	Toyota Mark II	Toyota Crown	Toyota Carina	Toyota Corona	Nissan Sunny	Honda Civic	Mazda Familia	Toyota Starlet	Toyota Sprinter
1991	Toyota Corolla	Toyota Mark II	Honda Civic	Toyota Crown	Toyota Carina	Nissan Sunny	Toyota Corona	Toyota Starlet	Toyota Sprinter	Nissan Bluebird
1992	Toyota Corolla	Toyota Mark II	Toyota Crown	Honda Civic	Nissan Sunny	Toyota Starlet	Toyota Carina	Toyota Corona	Nissan March	Toyota Sprinter
1993	Toyota Corolla	Toyota Mark II	Nissan March	Nissan Sunny	Toyota Crown	Honda Civic	Toyota Starlet	Toyota Estima	Toyota Sprinter	Toyota Carina
1994	Toyota Corolla	Toyota Mark II	Nissan March	Honda Civic	Toyota Crown	Nissan Sunny	Toyota Estima	Toyota Starlet	Toyota Carina	Toyota Sprinter
1995	Toyota Corolla	Nissan March	Toyota Crown	Honda Odyssey	Toyota Mark II	Honda Civic	Toyota Estima	Nissan Sunny	Toyota Starlet	Toyota Sprinter
1996	Toyota Corolla	Toyota Crown	Nissan March	Toyota Starlet	Toyota Mark II	Honda Odyssey	Honda CR-V	Toyota Estima	Nissan Sunny	Subaru Legacy
1997	Toyota Corolla	Nissan March	Toyota Mark II	Toyota Starlet	Honda Stepwgn	Toyota Crown	Toyota Ipsum	Toyota Estima	Mazda Demio	Honda Odyssey
1998	Toyota Corolla	Nissan Cube	Mazda Demio	Nissan March	Toyota Starlet	Honda Stepwgn	Toyota Mark II	Toyota Crown	Mitsubishi Chariot Grandis	Nissan Sunny
1999	Toyota Corolla	Toyota Vitz	Honda Stepwgn	Toyota Crown	Mazda Demio	Nissan Cube	Toyota Mark II	Subaru Legacy	Nissan March	Toyota TownAce Noah
2000	Toyota Corolla	Toyota Vitz	Toyota Estima	Honda Odyssey	Toyota FunCargo	Toyota Crown	Toyota bB	Nissan Cube	Honda Stepwgn	Mazda Demio
2001	Toyota Corolla	Toyota Vitz	Honda Stream	Toyota Estima	Honda Stepwgn	Honda Fit	Toyota Crown	Nissan Cube	Honda Odyssey	Toyota FunCargo
2002	Honda Fit	Toyota Corolla	Nissan March	Toyota Ist	Toyota Vitz	Toyota Noah	Toyota Estima	Toyota Voxy	Nissan Cube	Honda Mobilio
2003	Toyota Corolla	Honda Fit	Toyota Wish	Nissan Cube	Nissan March	Toyota Ist	Mazda Demio	Toyota Noah	Toyota Alphard	Toyota Estima
2004	Toyota Corolla	Honda Fit	Nissan Cube	Toyota Wish	Toyota Crown	Nissan March	Honda Odyssey	Toyota Ist	Toyota Alphard	Toyota Noah
2005	Toyota Corolla	Toyota Vitz	Honda Fit	Nissan Tiida	Nissan Note	Toyota Wish	Honda Stepwgn	Toyota Passo	Toyota Alphard	Toyota Crown
2006	Toyota Corolla	Toyota Vitz	Honda Fit	Toyota Estima	Nissan Serena	Honda Stepwgn	Toyota Wish	Toyota Ractis	Toyota Passo	Toyota Crown
2007	Toyota Corolla	Toyota Vitz	Honda Fit	Toyota Passo	Nissan Serena	Toyota Estima	Toyota Voxy	Mazda Demio	Nissan Tiida	Toyota Noah
2008	Honda Fit	Toyota Corolla	Toyota Vitz	Toyota Crown	Toyota Prius	Nissan Serena	Toyota Passo	Toyota Voxy	Nissan Tiida	Mazda Demio
2009	Toyota Vitz	Honda Fit	Toyota Vitz	Toyota Passo	Honda Insight	Toyota Corolla	Honda Freed	Nissan Serena	Toyota Voxy	Nissan Note
2010	Toyota Prius	Honda Fit	Toyota Vitz	Toyota Corolla	Honda Freed	Toyota Passo	Honda Stepwgn	Nissan Serena	Toyota Voxy	Nissan Note
2011	Toyota Prius	Honda Fit	Toyota Vitz	Nissan Serena	Toyota Corolla	Honda Freed	Mazda Demio	Toyota Ractis	Toyota Passo	Nissan March
2012	Toyota Prius	Toyota Aqua	Honda Fit	Honda Freed	Toyota Vitz	Nissan Serena	Nissan Note	Toyota Corolla	Honda Stepwgn	Toyota Vellfire
2013	Toyota Aqua	Toyota Prius	Honda Fit	Nissan Note	Toyota Corolla	Nissan Serena	Toyota Vitz	Toyota Crown	Honda Freed	Honda Stepwgn
2014	Toyota Aqua	Honda Fit	Toyota Prius	Toyota Corolla	Toyota Voxy	Nissan Note	Honda Vezel	Toyota Vitz	Nissan Serena	Toyota Noah
2015	Toyota Aqua	Toyota Prius	Honda Fit	Toyota Corolla	Nissan Note	Toyota Voxy	Toyota Vitz	Mazda Demio	Honda Vezel	Toyota Sienta
2016	Toyota Prius	Toyota Aqua	Toyota Sienta	Honda Fit	Nissan Note	Toyota Voxy	Toyota Corolla	Honda Vezel	Nissan Serena	Toyota Vitz
2017	Toyota Prius	Nissan Note	Toyota Aqua	Toyota C-HR	Honda Freed	Honda Fit	Toyota Sienta	Toyota Vitz	Toyota Voxy	Nissan Serena
2018	Nissan Note	Toyota Aqua	Toyota Prius	Nissan Serena	Toyota Sienta	Toyota Voxy	Honda Fit	Toyota Corolla	Toyota Vitz	Toyota Roomy
2019	Toyota Prius	Nissan Note	Toyota Sienta	Toyota Corolla	Toyota Aqua	Nissan Serena	Toyota Roomy	Toyota Voxy	Honda Freed	Toyota Vitz
2020	Toyota Yaris	Toyota Raize	Toyota Corolla	Honda Fit	Toyota Alphard	Toyota Roomy	Honda Freed	Toyota Sienta	Nissan Note	Toyota Voxy
2021	Toyota Yaris	Toyota Roomy	Toyota Corolla	Toyota Alphard	Nissan Note	Toyota Raize	Toyota Harrier	Toyota Aqua	Toyota Voxy	Honda Freed
2022	Toyota Yaris	Toyota Corolla	Nissan Note	Toyota Roomy	Toyota Raize	Honda Freed	Toyota Aqua	Toyota Sienta	Honda Fit	Toyota Alphard
2023	Toyota Yaris	Toyota Corolla	Toyota Sienta	Nissan Note	Toyota Roomy	Toyota Prius	Toyota Noah	Toyota Voxy	Toyota Aqua	Honda Freed
2024	Toyota Corolla	Toyota Yaris	Toyota Sienta	Nissan Note	Honda Freed	Toyota Prius	Toyota Alphard	Honda Vezel	Toyota Aqua	Toyota Voxy
2025	Toyota Yaris	Toyota Corolla	Toyota Sienta	Toyota Raize	Toyota Roomy	Honda Freed	Toyota Alphard	Toyota Noah	Toyota Voxy	Nissan Note
	1st	2nd	3rd	4th	5th	6th	7th	8th	9th	10th
See also : Best-selling models in: Australia; Brazil; India; Indonesia; Malaysia; Philippines; Thailand; Sweden

=== Kei cars ===
Top 10 best-selling kei cars in Japan by nameplate (excluding kei commercial vehicles), 2003–2025
Year	Models and Ranking									
Year	1st	2nd	3rd	4th	5th	6th	7th	8th	9th	10th
2003	Daihatsu Move	Suzuki Wagon R	Honda Life	Daihatsu Mira	Suzuki Alto	—				
2004	Suzuki Wagon R	Daihatsu Move	Suzuki Alto	Honda Life	Daihatsu Mira	Daihatsu Tanto	Mitsubishi eK	Nissan Moco	Subaru R2	Honda Vamos
2005	Suzuki Wagon R	Daihatsu Move	Suzuki Alto	Honda Life	Daihatsu Mira	Daihatsu Tanto	Mitsubishi eK	Nissan Moco	Honda That's	Suzuki Kei
2006	Suzuki Wagon R	Daihatsu Move	Suzuki Alto	Daihatsu Tanto	Honda Life	Daihatsu Mira	Honda Zest	Mitsubishi eK	Nissan Moco	Suzuki MR Wagon
2007	Suzuki Wagon R	Daihatsu Move	Daihatsu Tanto	Daihatsu Mira	Honda Life	Suzuki Alto	Nissan Moco	Mitsubishi eK	Subaru Stella	Honda Zest
2008	Suzuki Wagon R	Daihatsu Move	Daihatsu Tanto	Honda Life	Daihatsu Mira	Suzuki Palette	Suzuki Alto	Nissan Moco	Mitsubishi eK	Subaru Stella
2009	Suzuki Wagon R	Daihatsu Move	Daihatsu Tanto	Daihatsu Mira	Suzuki Alto	Suzuki Palette	Honda Life	Nissan Roox	Honda Zest	Nissan Moco
2010	Suzuki Wagon R	Daihatsu Tanto	Daihatsu Move	Suzuki Alto	Daihatsu Mira	Suzuki Palette	Honda Life	Nissan Moco	Nissan Roox	Honda Zest
2011	Suzuki Wagon R	Daihatsu Move	Daihatsu Tanto	Daihatsu Mira	Suzuki Alto	Honda Life	Nissan Moco	Suzuki Palette	Nissan Roox	Mitsubishi eK
2012	Daihatsu Mira	Honda N-Box	Suzuki Wagon R	Daihatsu Tanto	Daihatsu Move	Suzuki Alto	Nissan Moco	Suzuki Palette	Nissan Roox	Honda Life
2013	Honda N-Box	Daihatsu Move	Suzuki Wagon R	Daihatsu Mira	Daihatsu Tanto	Suzuki Alto	Honda N-One	Suzuki Spacia	Nissan Dayz	Nissan Moco
2014	Daihatsu Tanto	Honda N-Box	Suzuki Wagon R	Nissan Dayz	Honda N-WGN	Daihatsu Mira	Daihatsu Move	Suzuki Spacia	Suzuki Alto	Suzuki Hustler
2015	Honda N-Box	Daihatsu Tanto	Nissan Dayz	Daihatsu Move	Suzuki Alto	Suzuki Wagon R	Honda N-WGN	Suzuki Hustler	Daihatsu Mira	Suzuki Spacia
2016	Honda N-Box	Daihatsu Move	Nissan Dayz	Daihatsu Tanto	Suzuki Alto	Honda N-WGN	Suzuki Hustler	Suzuki Spacia	Daihatsu Mira	Suzuki Wagon R
2017	Honda N-Box	Daihatsu Move	Daihatsu Tanto	Nissan Dayz	Suzuki Wagon R	Suzuki Spacia	Daihatsu Mira	Suzuki Alto	Honda N-WGN	Suzuki Hustler
2018	Honda N-Box	Suzuki Spacia	Nissan Dayz	Daihatsu Tanto	Daihatsu Move	Daihatsu Mira	Suzuki Wagon R	Suzuki Hustler	Suzuki Alto	Honda N-WGN
2019	Honda N-Box	Daihatsu Tanto	Suzuki Spacia	Nissan Dayz	Daihatsu Move	Daihatsu Mira	Suzuki Wagon R	Suzuki Alto	Suzuki Hustler	Mitsubishi eK
2020	Honda N-Box	Suzuki Spacia	Daihatsu Tanto	Daihatsu Move	Nissan Dayz	Suzuki Hustler	Daihatsu Mira	Nissan Roox	Honda N-WGN	Suzuki Wagon R
2021	Honda N-Box	Suzuki Spacia	Daihatsu Tanto	Daihatsu Move	Nissan Roox	Suzuki Hustler	Suzuki Wagon R	Daihatsu Mira	Daihatsu Taft	Suzuki Alto
2022	Honda N-Box	Daihatsu Tanto	Suzuki Spacia	Daihatsu Move	Suzuki Wagon R	Nissan Roox	Suzuki Hustler	Suzuki Alto	Daihatsu Mira	Daihatsu Taft
2023	Honda N-Box	Daihatsu Tanto	Suzuki Spacia	Daihatsu Move	Suzuki Hustler	Suzuki Wagon R	Nissan Roox	Suzuki Alto	Daihatsu Mira	Daihatsu Taft
2024	Honda N-Box	Suzuki Spacia	Daihatsu Tanto	Suzuki Hustler	Suzuki Wagon R	Nissan Roox	Suzuki Alto	Mitsubishi eK	Nissan Days	Daihatsu Mira
2025	Honda N-Box	Suzuki Spacia	Daihatsu Tanto	Daihatsu Move	Suzuki Hustler	Suzuki Wagon R	Nissan Roox	Mitsubishi eK	Suzuki Alto	Daihatsu Mira
	1st	2nd	3rd	4th	5th	6th	7th	8th	9th	10th
See also : Best-selling models in: Australia; Brazil; India; Indonesia; Malaysia; Philippines; Thailand; Sweden

== See also ==
- List of automobile manufacturers of Japan
- Automotive industry
- Japanese used vehicle exporting
- Timeline of Japanese automobiles
