= Voluntary export restraint =

Phenomenon of international trade relations

A voluntary export restraint (VER) or voluntary export restriction is a self-imposed, voluntary restriction implemented by an exporting country, on the volume of its exports to another country. This can be negotiated between governments, or with the competing industries.

By this definition, the term VER is a generic reference for all bilaterally agreed measures to restrain exports. They are sometimes referred to as 'Export Visas'. The restraint could be a preset limit, a reduction in the exported amount, or a complete restriction.

Typically, VERs arise when industries seek protection from competing imports from another country. Then, through negotiations, the exporting country may choose to implement VERs to appease the importing country, and deter it from imposing explicit (and less flexible) trade barriers, such as tariffs and import quotas.

The implementation of VERs was prohibited in 1994 under modifications to the General Agreement on Tariffs and Trade (Article 11), with member countries also agreeing to phase out existing VERs.

== Overview ==
Voluntary export restrictions are usually due to pressure from importing countries. Therefore, one can consider export restrictions to be "voluntary" simply because exporting countries may find such restrictions more desirable than alternative trade barriers that importing countries may establish. In addition, in non-competitive, especially oligopolistic industries, export companies may find that negotiating voluntary export restrictions is beneficial to them, and then export restrictions are truly "voluntary."

If voluntary export restrictions include government-to-government agreements, they usually refer to orderly market sales arrangements, and usually specify export management rules, negotiation rights, and supervision of trade flows. In some countries, especially in the United States, structured marketing arrangements are legally different from strictly defined voluntary export restrictions. Agreements involving industry participation are often referred to as voluntary restriction arrangements. The difference between these forms of voluntary export restrictions is mainly legal and literal, and has nothing to do with the economic impact of voluntary export restrictions.

A typical voluntary export restriction imposes restrictions on the supply of export products based on the type, country and quantity of the commodity. The General Agreement on Tariffs and Trade regulations on government's influence on trade prohibit export restrictions under normal circumstances; if export restrictions are approved, these restrictions must be non-discriminatory and can only be implemented through tariffs, taxes and fees. However, the government's involvement in voluntary export restrictions is not always clear. In addition, voluntary export restrictions do not always have clear market share clauses; for example, they may take the form of export forecasts and therefore become cautious in nature.

== Characteristics ==
VERs are typically implemented on exports from one specific country to another. VERs have been used since the 1930s at least, and have been applied to products ranging from textiles and footwear to steel, machine tools and automobiles. They became a popular form of protection during the 1980s; they did not violate countries' agreements under the General Agreement on Tariffs and Trade (GATT) in force. As a result of the Uruguay round of the GATT, completed in 1994, World Trade Organization (WTO) members agreed not to implement any new VERs, and to phase out any existing ones over a four-year period, with exceptions grantable for one sector in each importing country.

Some examples of VERs occurred with automobile exports from Japan in the early 1980s and with textile exports in the 1950s and 1960s.

Along with import quotas, Voluntary Export Restraints (VERs) are a form of a non-tariff trade barrier. Import quotas and VERs differ in two key areas, however. Like tariffs, import quotas artificially restrict demand for the imposed good, while VERs artificially restrict supply. Additionally, import quotas and tariffs, when imposed, affect all imports into the domestic market, regardless of country or supplier. Voluntary Export Restraints are able to be negotiated to exclude certain exporting countries or suppliers, based on factors such as supplier share of the good or refutation of export limitations. Due to these key differences, the economic outcome in relation to the domestic price of the good will be different when imposing an import quota or tariff compared to imposing a VER. Imposition of a VER will lead to higher domestic prices of the good when:

- All markets are competitive
- Domestic production is monopolized
- Either importing or exporting is monopolized and some exporters are not included in the VER agreement

== Manifestation ==
=== Unilateral automatic export restrictions ===
Unilateral automatic export restriction means that the exporting country unilaterally sets export quotas on its own to restrict the export of commodities. Some of these quotas are stipulated and announced by the government of the exporting country. Exporters must apply for quotas from relevant agencies and obtain an export license before exporting. Some are stipulated by exporters or trade associations of the exporting country according to the government's policy intentions.

=== Agreement automatic export restrictions ===
The automatic export restriction of the agreement means that the importing country and the exporting country gradually expand the self-restriction agreement or orderly marketing arrangements to provide for certain products to be exported during the validity period of the agreement. The exporting country has accordingly adopted an export licensing system. Restrict the export of relevant commodities, and the importing country shall conduct supervision and inspection based on customs statistics. As one of the non-tariff measures, automatic export restrictions have seriously hindered the development of international trade. In September 1986, the Uruguay Round of negotiations began to include automatic export restrictions as one of the important elements of the negotiations to reduce and abolish non-tariff barriers. As a result of the negotiations, Article 19 of the General Agreement was amended to restrict the application of automatic export restrictions.

== Reasons for introduction ==
In general, restrictive trade measures are usually taken for two purposes: to protect or improve the balance of payments situation, and to provide relief for industries adversely affected by foreign competition, thus allowing them to undertake the adjustments necessary to regain competitiveness.

VERs were usually implemented for the second reason and compared to the other protectionist policies they offered several advantages, at least from the viewpoint of the protecting country.

For example in contrast to imposing protectionist measures under the General Agreement on Tariffs and Trade (GATT) rules (as amended before 1994), a protectionist country was, in the case of imposing a VER, not expected to negotiate compensations with the exporting country or face further retaliation (probably also in the form of protectionist policies) if it failed to do so. This was because VERs already incorporated built-in compensation in the form of rents (i.e., higher earnings arising from the scarcity of a product). This made acceptance by the exporting side more likely and retaliation less probable.

Another reason for the introduction of VERs was that imposing tariff or quotas on foreign goods may be politically risky since the costs of such measures can be recognized by the public. Because the VER was an action taken by a foreign entity, domestic legislative struggle could be avoided. Furthermore, the administrative costs associated with protectionism were reduced this way and transferred to the exporting country.

A third reason was that a VER, by strictly addressing the one or few low-cost suppliers that were disrupting the domestic industry, obviated the possibility of harming third countries in the process of defending domestic manufacturers (which could have been the case with a nondiscriminatory import quota).

For all of these reasons domestic policymakers often preferred a VER to alternative measures. It offered relatively quick, politically inexpensive assistance to an industry threatened by import competition.

A VER could also have been attractive to the exporting country, since it made the imported good scarcer, therefore a producer was enabled to raise its price. Other reasons that made a VER attractive, even for exporters, were that it provided the government of the exporting country with an element of control over the domestic industry, and it terminated the uncertainty inherent in a countervailing duty investigation. These factors suggest that the exporter usually agreed readily to a VER.

== Limitations ==
There are ways in which a company can avoid a VER. For example, the exporting country's company can build a manufacturing plant in the country to which its exports would be directed, so that it no longer needs to export its goods to this country, and therefore would not be bound by the country's VER. This suggests that VERs were usually not effective in the long run.

This strategy was used by the Japanese car manufacturers in the attempt to avoid a US imposed VER on the import of Japanese automobiles.

The option to build manufacturing facilities overseas, and in this way, bypass exporting rules is one of the main reasons why VERs have historically been ineffective in protecting domestic producers.

== Advantages and disadvantages ==
With functioning VERs, producers in the importing country experience an increase in well-being as there is decreased competition, which should result in higher prices, profits, and employment. VERs are also noted for having a less-damaging effect on the political relations between countries and they are also relatively easy to remove.

Such benefits to producers and the labor market, however, come with some notable trade-offs. VERs reduce national welfare by creating negative trade effects, negative consumption distortions, and negative production distortions.(This could again be illustrated by the 1981 US Automobile VER.)

== 1950s-1960s VERs on textiles in America and Europe ==
In the 1950s and the 1960s American manufacturers of textiles faced increasing competition from Southeast Asian countries. Therefore, the US government requested VERs be established by many of these Asian countries and was successful in doing so. During the Eisenhower administration, the United States government negotiated a voluntary export restraint with Japanese textile manufacturers to limit the amount of imports of Japanese produced cotton products, including velveteen, cotton fabrics, and blouses which had reached an all-time high in exports in 1955. The agreement did not satisfy American textile manufacturers, leading various states to enact discriminatory labeling on imported Japanese textiles. A new bilateral VER agreement was negotiated and announced in January 1957 that capped textile imports from Japan at 235 million square yards, which was equivalent to roughly 1.5% of American textile industry output at the time. The VER resulted in a decline of Japanese cotton exports totaling $84 million in 1956 and $69 million in 1961. American textile manufacturers continued to lobby for additional VERs and import quotas against unrestrained low-wage competitors from Hong Kong and India that had filled the gap in the US market left by the reduced Japanese imports. The legacy of the bilateral voluntary export restraint and resulting losses in the US market for Japanese textile manufacturers contributed to a period of strained trade relations between Japan and the United States.

Textile producers in Europe faced in the 1950s and the 1960s similar problems to their US counterparts, and as a result negotiated voluntary export restraints as well. Eventually, an agreement was reached between the exporting and importing parties within the textile industry that led to the formation of the Multi-Fiber Agreement in the 1970s. This agreement was essentially an arrangement of multilateral voluntary export restraints. It was terminated in 2005 after the expiry of a ten-year transition period since the 1994 GAT.

== 1981 Automobile VER ==
Following the 1979 oil crisis, the American auto producers suffered record losses as customers moved away from the "gas-guzzlers" typically produced by the American companies toward more fuel-efficient cars (that were mostly imported from Japan).

When the automobile industry in the United States was threatened by the popularity of cheaper, more fuel efficient Japanese cars, a 1981 voluntary restraint agreement limited the Japanese to exporting 1.68 million cars to the U.S. annually as stipulated by U.S Government. The agreement affected all Japanese manufactured vehicles exported to the United States, but did not include Japanese brands manufactured in the United States, such as Honda cars produced in Ohio based factories. Vehicles produced by Japanese manufacturers like Mitsubishi or Suzuki for United States brands like Chrysler and General Motors were counted in the export restraint limitations. This quota was originally intended to expire after three years, in April 1984. However, with a growing deficit in trade with Japan, and under pressure from domestic manufacturers, the US government extended the quotas for an additional year. The cap was raised to 1.85 million cars for this additional year, then to 2.3 million for 1985. The voluntary restraint was removed in 1994.

The Japanese automobile industry responded by establishing assembly plants or "transplants" in the United States (primarily in the Southern U.S. states where right-to-work laws exist as opposed to the Rust Belt states with established labor unions) to produce mass market vehicles. Some Japanese manufacturers who had their transplant assembly factories in the Rust Belt e.g. Mazda, Mitsubishi had to have a joint venture with a Big Three manufacturer (Chrysler/Mitsubishi which became Diamond Star Motors, Ford/Mazda that evolved into AutoAlliance International). GM established NUMMI which was initially a joint venture with Toyota which later expanded to include a Canadian subsidiary (CAMI)) - a GM/Suzuki which were consolidated that evolved into the Geo division in the U.S. (its Canadian counterparts Passport and Asuna were short lived - Isuzu automobiles manufactured during this era were sold as captive imports). The Japanese Big Three (Honda, Toyota, and Nissan) also began exporting bigger, more expensive cars (soon under their newly formed luxury brands like Acura, Lexus, and Infiniti - the luxury marques distanced themselves from its parent brand which was mass marketed) in order to make more money from a limited number of cars.

The effect of the voluntary export restraint was, that it raised the prices of the cars imported from Japan for about $1200, while reducing their sales. After the initial institution of the voluntary export restraint in 1981, prices of Japanese imported vehicles did not raise significantly. However, significant increases in price of Japanese cars from 1986 onward can be attributed as an effect of the initial voluntary export restraint. The Net effect on Japanese earnings was close to zero.

This policy increased the US car sales and total revenue of the American car manufacturers by about $10 billion. The increase in earnings of the American companies was mainly paid for by the consumers in the US. By the imposition of this policy, they suffered the loss of around $13 billion (measured in 1983 dollars). The overall net welfare effect on the US economy was that the social welfare losses totalled $3 billion. An analysis of this particular trade policy conducted by Berry et al. in 1999 estimates the foregone revenue of the voluntary export restraint relative to a tariff amounted to $11.2 billion which would have nearly equaled the consumer welfare losses of $13.1 billion. Consumer welfare for United States domestic consumers was the most affected by this voluntary export restraint, with the majority of the burden disproportionately falling on the consumers with more inelastic demand for Japanese manufactured products, especially vehicles.

== See also ==
- Voluntary compliance
