= Weetalibah Nature Reserve =

Protected area in New South Wales, Australia

Coordinates: 31.727°S 149.587°E

The Weetalibah Nature Reserve is a 2,146-hectare (5,300-acre) protected area in Weetalabah, Central West New South Wales, Australia. Created in August 1968, it supports narrow-leaved ironbark, white cypress, broad-leaved ironbark and tumbledown gum. Mugga ironbark and red stringybark are also present.
