= Mitsubishi Model A =

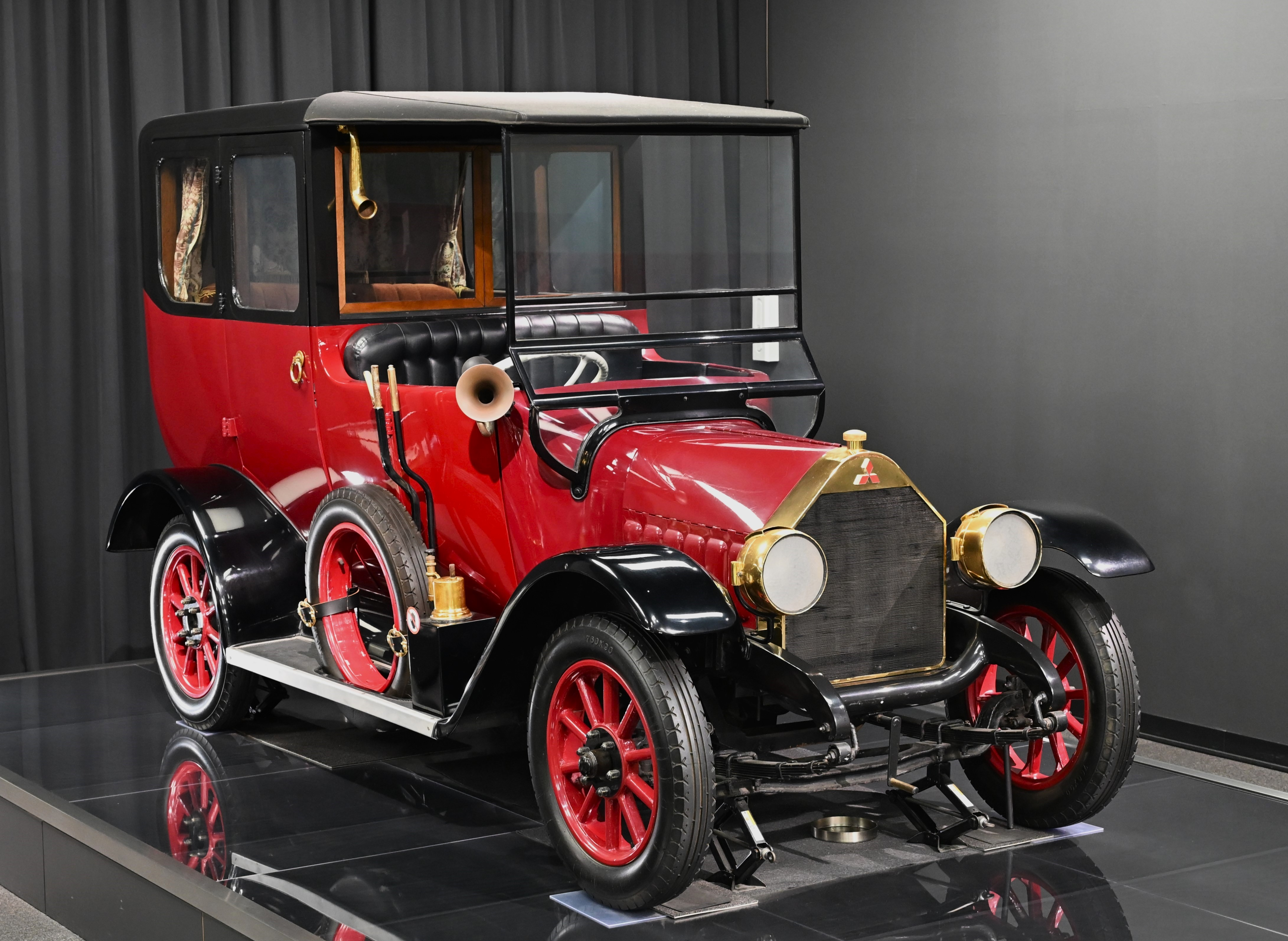

Overview
- Manufacturer: Mitsubishi Shipbuilding Co., Ltd.
- Production: 1917–1921
- Assembly: Japan: Kobe

Body and chassis
- Body style: 4-door sedan
- Related: Fiat Tipo 3

Powertrain
- Engine: 2,765 cc I4 (original); 977 cc KE43 I4 (reproduction)

Dimensions
- Wheelbase: 2,640 mm (103.9 in)
- Length: 3,830 mm (150.8 in)
- Width: 1,620 mm (63.8 in)
- Height: 2,070 mm (81.5 in)
- Curb weight: 1,315 kg (2,899 lb)

The Mitsubishi Model A is the only car built by the Mitsubishi Shipbuilding Company, a member of the Mitsubishi corporate group which would eventually evolve into Mitsubishi Motors, and the first series production automobile manufactured in Japan. It was the brainchild of Koyata Iwasaki, Mitsubishi's fourth president and the nephew of founder Yataro Iwasaki, who foresaw the vast potential of motorized vehicles and the role they would play in the economic development of Japan. Envisioned as a luxury vehicle for high echelon government officials and top executives, the Model A had to be reliable, comfortable, and a showcase of Japanese craftsmanship. After the war in 1964, Mitsubishi would use this approach again to build an exclusive sedan for government officials and top level executives with the Mitsubishi Debonair.

Based on the Fiat Tipo 3, it was a four-door seven-seat sedan using a town car body style powered by a front-mounted 26 kW (35 hp) 2.8-litre straight-4 engine driving the rear wheels, and was capable of speeds up to 60 miles per hour (97 km/h). 22 were built at the company's Kobe shipyard, including prototypes, between 1917 and 1921.

Because it was expensive to produce—it was built entirely by hand, with the interior rear compartment furnished with lacquered white cypress—it could not compete with cheaper American and European competition, and Mitsubishi halted production after four years. Concentrating instead on its successful Fuso commercial vehicles, the Model A would be the company's last passenger car until the Mitsubishi 500 of 1960.

At Mitsubishi's Auto Gallery (a museum of the company's most historically significant vehicles, established at their R&D Center in Okazaki in 1989) there is a replica on display, assembled in 1972 using materials of the time. It has a slightly shorter wheelbase, and uses a water-cooled 977 cc four-cylinder OHV engine instead of the larger 2.8-litre original.

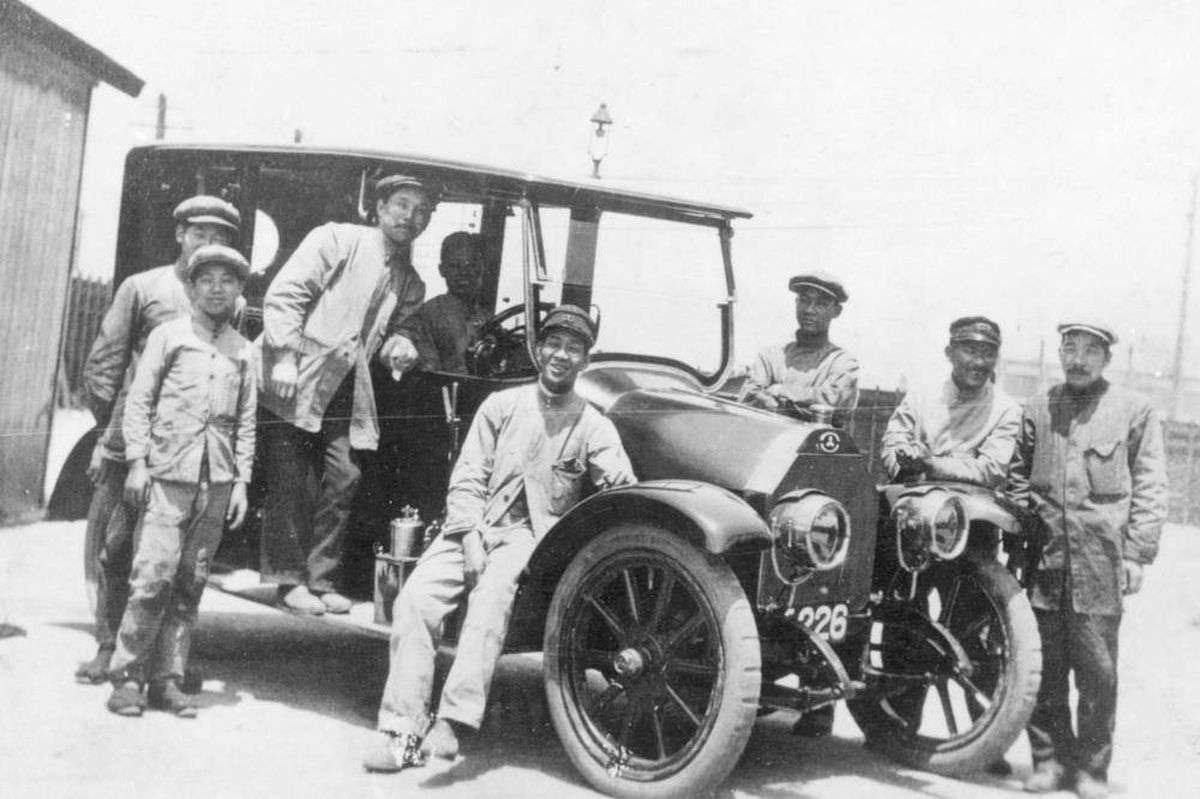
Mitsubishi Model A and workers in 1917

== References and external links ==
- Model A replica at Mitsubishi Auto Gallery
- Mitsubishi Model A specifications at Carfolio.com (these differ slightly from Mitsubishi's own figures)
- "The Greatest Japanese Cars Of All Time", Michael Frank, Forbes.com, 23 April 2001
