= Mitsubishi Colt 1000 =

The Mitsubishi Colt (A20) was one of their first series of passenger cars produced by Shin Mitsubishi Heavy-Industries, Ltd, one of the companies which would become Mitsubishi Motors. Built from 1963 until 1970, they were available in four body styles (2-dr/4-dr sedan, 2-dr van, and 4-dr wagon) and on two different wheelbases, with gradually increasing engine displacements 1000, 1100, 1200, and 1500. After a May 1968 facelift, they were marketed as the "New Colt". Along with the smaller, fastback Colts they formed the mainstay of Mitsubishi's passenger car lineup in the 1960s. With the late 1969 introduction of the new, larger Colt Galant, the outmoded Colt-series soon faded away, eventually replaced by the smaller Mitsubishi Lancer as well. The dimensions were kept small so as to provide Japanese buyers the ability to purchase a car that complied with the Japanese government compact car dimension regulations and to keep the annual road tax obligation affordable.

== Colt 1000 (series A20) ==
Mitsubishi Colt 1000
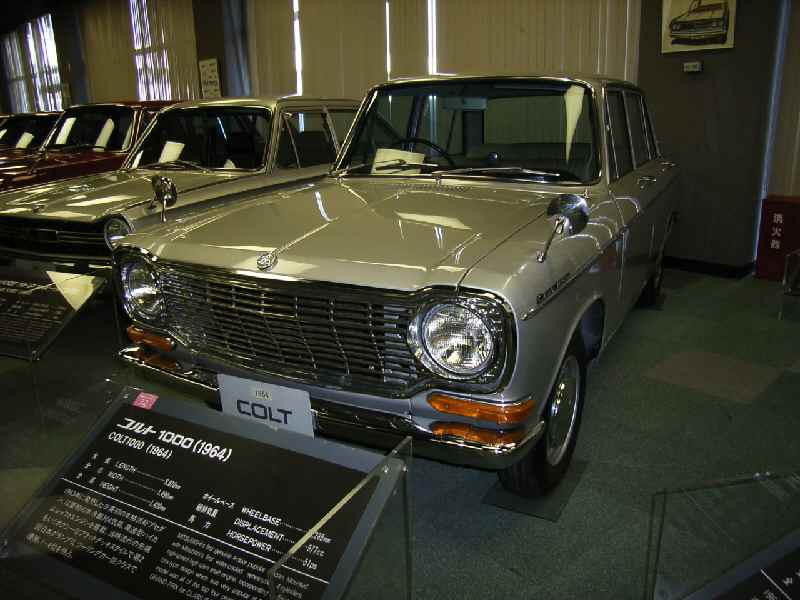

Overview
- Manufacturer: Mitsubishi Motors
- Production: 1963–1966
- Assembly: Japan: Okazaki, Aichi (Nagoya Plant)

Body and chassis
- Body style: 4-door sedan 2-door wagon (Van)
- Layout: Front-engine, rear-wheel drive
- Related: Mitsubishi Colt 1000F

Powertrain
- Engine: 977 cc KE43 OHV I4
- Transmission: 4-speed manual 3-speed SCAT semi-automatic

Dimensions
- Wheelbase: 2,285 mm (90.0 in)
- Length: 3,820 mm (150.4 in); 3,905 mm (153.7 in) (Van)
- Width: 1,490 mm (58.7 in)
- Height: 1,420 mm (55.9 in); 1,470 mm (57.9 in) (Van)
- Curb weight: 865–880 kg (1,910–1,940 lb) (Van)

Available as a four-door sedan, with a traditional Panhard layout, the A20 Colt 1000 was powered by a 977 cc engine producing 51 PS (38 kW) at 6,000 rpm. The Colt 1000 was introduced in July 1963. Top speed was 125 km/h (78 mph). Traditional throughout, the Colt 1000 also had a column shifter for its (fully synchronized) four-speed manual transmission. In December 1965, a 3-speed semi-automatic transmission was also added, unfortunately named SCAT (Single-Coupling Automatic Transmission). Top speed remained the same. Standard and DeLuxe models were available, for the Van as well as for the sedan. In April 1964, a better equipped version of the DeLuxe called the "Popular" was added to the lineup.

There was also a two-door wagon, known as the "Van", as is typical in Japan where wagons are traditionally only for commercial purposes, which featured a horizontally divided tailgate and a maximum 400 kg (882 lb) payload (200 kg with 4 passengers). The rear seat had steel backing and when folded down formed a flat loading floor, as per legal requirements for Japanese commercial vehicles. Strapping points were visible in the rearmost side windows. Its top speed is slightly lower, at 122 km/h (76 mph).

In motorsport, Colt 1000-based touring cars took a clean sweep of the podium in their class at the 1964 Japanese Grand Prix, following the successes of the preceding Mitsubishi 500 and Colt 600s.

The 1966 model year Colt 1000s, the last year before being replaced by the 1100, received an upgraded 55 PS (40 kW) engine which later saw service in the smaller, fastback Colt 1000F.

== Colt 1100 (series A21) ==
Mitsubishi Colt 1100
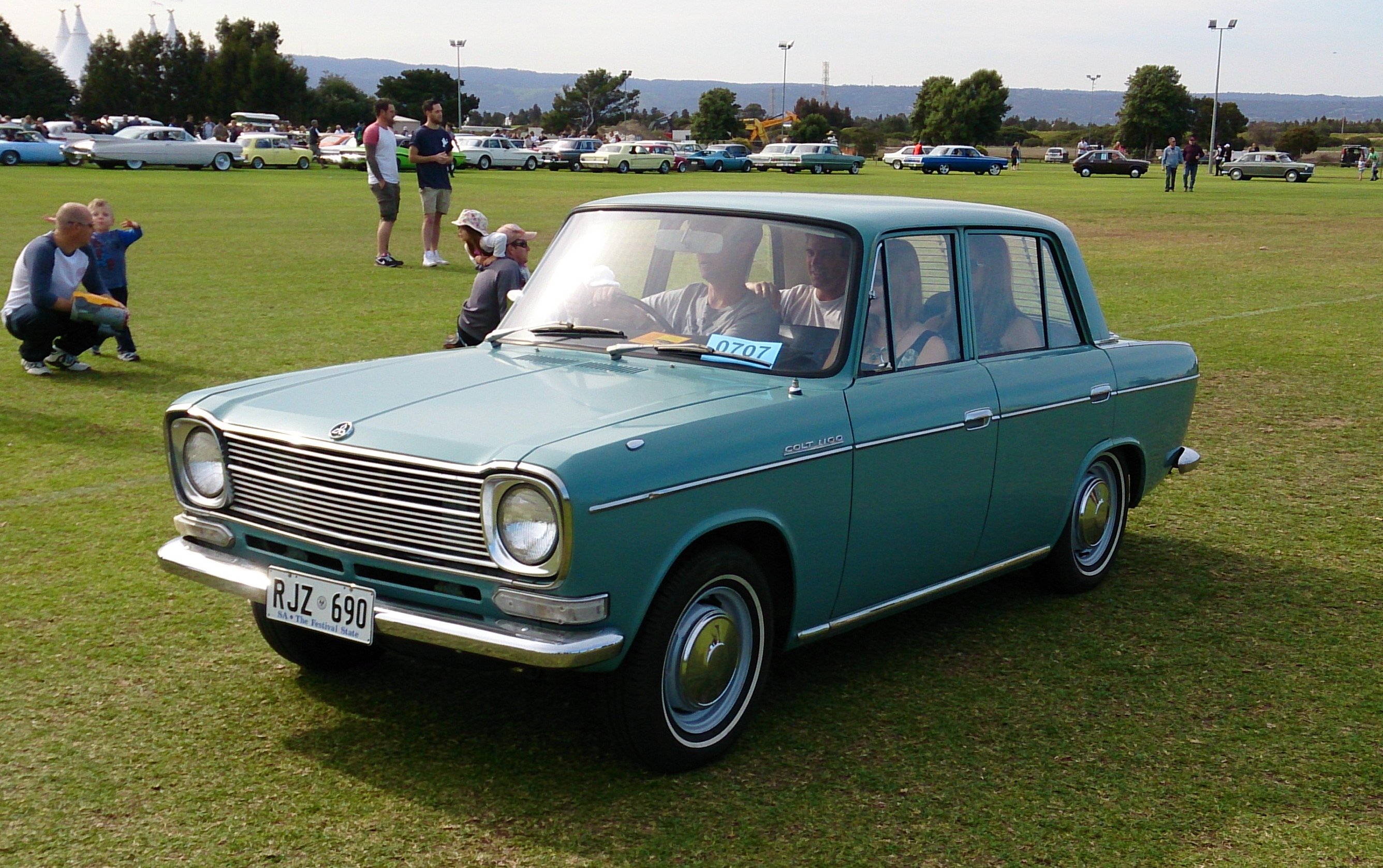
- Mitsubishi Colt 1100 Sedan

Overview
- Manufacturer: Mitsubishi Motors
- Also called: Colt 1100
- Production: 1966–1968
- Assembly: Japan: Okazaki, Aichi (Nagoya Plant)

Body and chassis
- Body style: 4-door sedan 3-door wagon
- Layout: Front-engine, rear-wheel drive

Powertrain
- Engine: 1088 cc KE44 OHV I4
- Transmission: 4MT, column or floor

Dimensions
- Wheelbase: 2,285 mm (90.0 in)
- Length: 3,855 mm (151.8 in)
- Width: 1,490 mm (58.7 in)
- Height: 1,420 mm (55.9 in)

The Mitsubishi Colt 1100 succeeded the Colt 1000 from September 1966, receiving the A21 chassis code. The 1100 was powered by a four-cylinder pushrod engine of 1,088 cc capacity producing 58 PS (43 kW) at 6,000 rpm, for a top speed of 135 km/h (84 mph).

Along with trim differences, such as a different grille without a dip in the lower middle part, bumper overriders meant that the 1100 was also 35 mm (1.4 in) longer than its predecessor. Somehow the weight dropped by 40 kilos, to 800 kg (1,764 lb). The 1100 was also available with a floor-mounted shifter, unlike the 1000 and later 1200. Originally available in Standard or DeLuxe trims, a Sporty DeLuxe version joined the lineup soon after its introduction. This also formed the basis for the Colt 1500 SS. The Colt 1100 was replaced by the "New Colt" 1200 in 1968.

There was also an 1100 Van, in Standard or deLuxe form. It offered two-doors and a horizontally split tailgate, and a payload of 400 kg (882 lb) (or 200 kg with five occupants). At 3,905 mm (153.7 in), its body was a little longer, otherwise dimensions were the same. The KE44 engine remained the same, but lower gearing meant top speed was down to 125 km/h (78 mph).

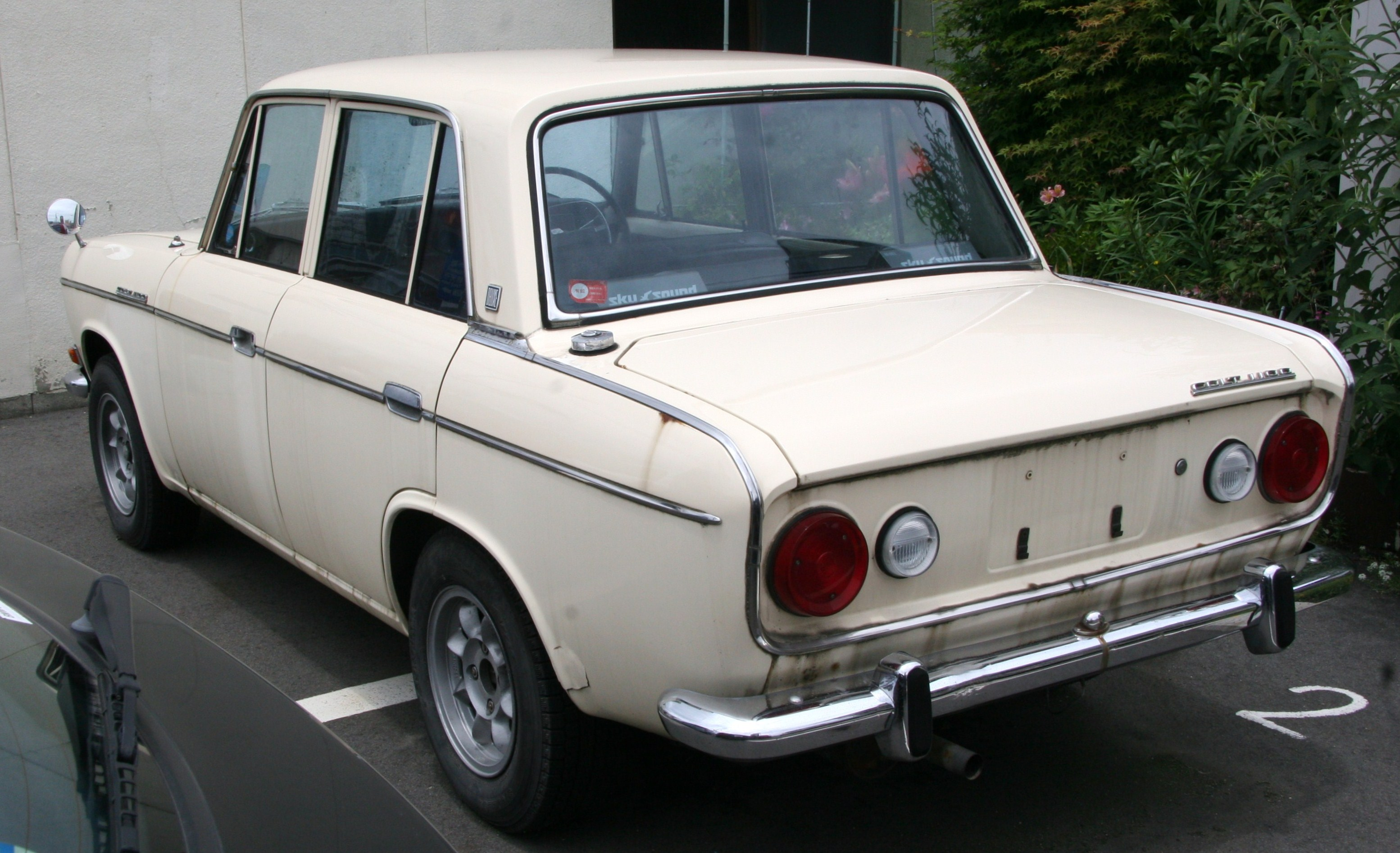
Mitsubishi Colt 1100 Sedan (with after-market wheels)

== Colt 1200 (series A23) ==
Mitsubishi Colt 1200
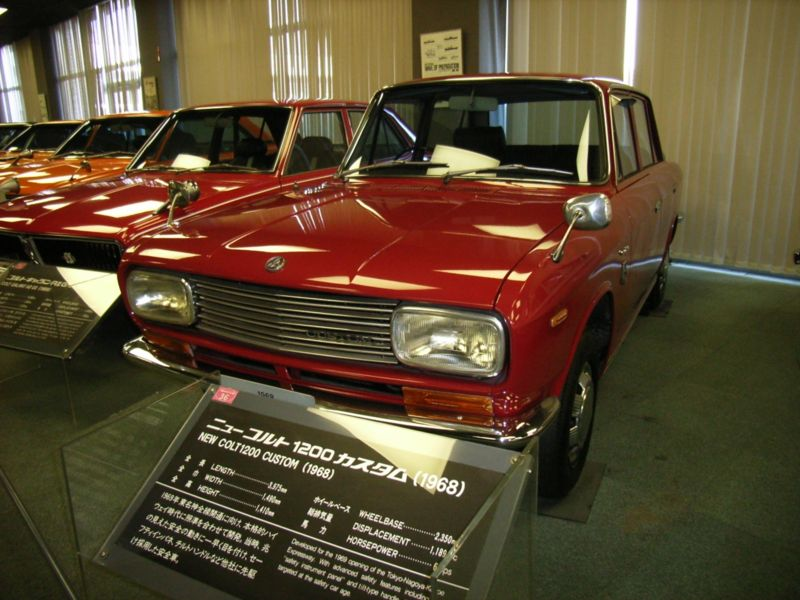
- Mitsubishi New Colt 1200 Custom (1968)

Overview
- Manufacturer: Mitsubishi Motors
- Production: May 1968–1970
- Assembly: Japan: Okazaki, Aichi (Nagoya Plant); Malaysia: Tampoi, Johor (C&C)

Body and chassis
- Body style: 4-door sedan; 3-door wagon; 5-door wagon
- Layout: Front-engine, rear-wheel drive

Powertrain
- Engine: 1189 cc KE46 OHV I4

Dimensions
- Wheelbase: 2,285 mm (90.0 in) (3-door wagon); 2,350 mm (93 in)
- Length: 3,975 mm (156.5 in)
- Width: 1,490 mm (59 in)
- Height: 1,410 mm (56 in)
- Curb weight: 790 kg (1,740 lb)

Chronology
- Successor: Mitsubishi Lancer

Along with a May 1968 facelift, whereby the Colt became the "New Colt", the engine was upgraded again: with the long-stroke 1189 cc and 62 PS (46 kW) KE46 it became the Mitsubishi New Colt 1200, chassis code A23. "New Colts" are easily recognized by the large rectangular headlights rather than the earlier round ones, along with a lower front grille and more sloping tip of the hood. On the rear, wide slim rectangular taillamps replaced the earlier round ones. All New Colt sedans were built on the longer body of the Colt 1500, which received the same upgrades simultaneously. Unlike the previous generation, the New Colt 1200 sat on a 65 mm longer wheelbase (2,350 mm or 92.5 in). The price was marginally increased over the previous 1100, while the price of the Colt 1500 remained unchanged. Later on, the engine was upgraded to 66 PS (49 kW), which afforded a top speed of 140 km/h (87 mph).

Available as a two-door and four-door sedan, and also as a three-door wagon ("Van", still with the shorter wheelbase), the Colt 1200 could reach 140 km/h (87 mph). An extremely rare five-door wagon, more luxuriously equipped than the Van and with entirely different rear bodywork was added in October 1968. The so-called "Estate Van" version was aimed at private rather than commercial use. A four-speed, full-synchro, column shifted manual was standard, whether in Standard or Custom equipment levels. The Colt 1200 remained available alongside the new Galant for a brief period in late 1969 and early 1970, but not much customer interest remained.

In December 1968 assembly of the Colt 1200 began in Malaysia, this being the first Mitsubishi to be built there.

== Colt 1500 ==
Mitsubishi Colt 1500
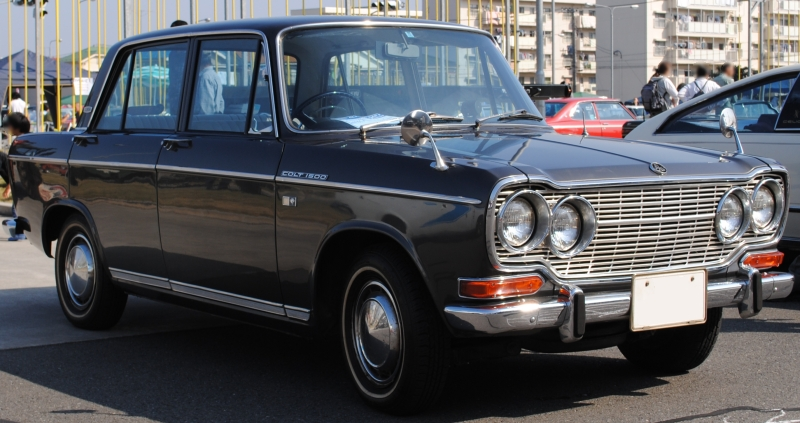

Overview
- Manufacturer: Mitsubishi Motors
- Production: 1965–1969 (1970 for Vans)
- Assembly: Japan: Nagoya, Aichi (Nagoya Oe Plant)

Body and chassis
- Body style: 4-door sedan 2-door sedan (1968–1969); 2-door wagon ("Van"); 4-door wagon (1968–1970)
- Layout: Front-engine, rear-wheel drive

Powertrain
- Engine: 1498 cc KE45 OHV I4

Dimensions
- Wheelbase: 2,285–2,350 mm (90.0–92.5 in)
- Length: 3,910–3,995 mm (153.9–157.3 in)
- Width: 1,490 mm (58.7 in)
- Height: 1,395–1,425 mm (54.9–56.1 in)

Chronology
- Successor: Mitsubishi Colt Galant

The Mitsubishi Colt 1500 (A25) was a bigger engined version, joining the smaller Colt 1000 in November 1965. The engine was a bored-out, four-cylinder version of the new Debonair's six-cylinder KE64 engine. Unlike its lesser one-liter sibling, the 1500 received four canted headlights and sat on a 65 mm longer wheelbase (2,350 mm or 92.5 in). Originally available as a four-door sedan and two-door wagon, it was powered by a 1,498 cc engine producing 70 PS (51 kW).

The wagon (Colt 1500 Van) had a horizontally divided rear tailgate and used the shorter wheelbase body of the 1100; it was available in either Standard or DeLuxe trim. Equipped with a three-speed column-shifted manual, a four-speed model (Overtop, "OT") was available on sedans. The fourth gear raised the top speed from 140 to 145 km/h (87 to 90 mph). The Van versions, lower geared for more load capacity, could only reach 125 km/h (78 mph).

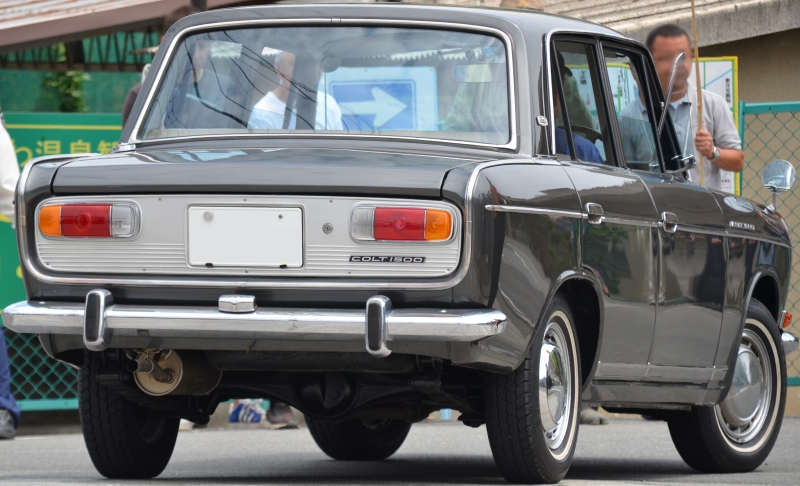
Rear view of Colt 1500 (pre-facelift)

Echoing the Sporty DeLuxe version of the 1100, the 1500 Sports Sedan appeared in December 1966, discernible by its blacked-out grille and single headlights. Actually, the 1500 SS used the entire shorter and lighter Colt 1100 body (thus weighing in at 890 kg or 1,962 lb) and its floor-mounted shifter. It also received a close-ratio four-speed transmission and front disc brakes. Top speed remained unchanged, with the quarter-mile sprint requiring 19.0 seconds.

=== New Colt 1500 ===
In May 1968 the 1500 became the New Colt, receiving the same body modifications as described in the Colt 1200 section, including the rectangular headlights. The chassis code became A27. Prices for the Colt 1500 remained unchanged while the 1200 was somewhat pricier than the preceding Colt 1100. New was a two-door sedan bodystyle, unusual in having roll-down rear windows while not having rear doors. The three-speed was discontinued, with all standard models now receiving the 3+OT transmission. Top speeds were 145 km/h for the sedan, 135 km/h for the Van (84 and 90 mph respectively).

An 85 PS (63 kW), twin-SU carbureted "Super Sports" model was added in August 1968, and was popular in rallying. In October 1968 a now extremely rare four-door wagon aimed at private buyers (unlike the Van commercial vehicle) was added, as for the Colt 1200. Called the "Estate Van," this was more comfortably equipped than the Van version, sitting on the longer wheelbase, and with unique rear bodywork. The Colt 1500 was discontinued in late 1969 upon the introduction of the company's Colt Galant sedan, although the smaller Colt 1200 remained available for a little longer yet. The four-door 1500 Estate Van also remained on sale into 1970, as the new Colt Galant Van had not yet been introduced. New Colt 1200 and 1500 sedans were still being registered in 1971, long after they had been discontinued.

== See also ==
- Mitsubishi Colt
