= Japan Automobile Manufacturers Association =

Trade association in Japan

Japan Automobile Manufacturers Association, Inc.
- Abbreviation: JAMA
- Formation: April 3, 1967; 59 years ago
- Type: Trade association
- Legal status: Organization
- Purpose: To promote the sound development of the Japanese automobile industry and contribute to social and economic welfare
- Location: Minato, Tokyo, Japan
- Coordinates: 35°39′34.2″N 139°45′12″E
- Region served: Japan
- Members: 14
- Official language: Japanese
- Chairman: Koji Sato
- Website: www.jama.or.jp/english/

Japan Automobile Manufacturers Association (一般社団法人 日本自動車工業会, Ippan Shadanhōjin Nihon Jidōsha Kōgyō-kai), or JAMA, is a trade association with its headquarters in Tokyo, Japan. It was founded in April 1967 and serves as a platform for the automakers of Japan to share technological developments and management practices. There are currently 14 member companies, manufacturing not only cars, but trucks and motorcycles as well. The organization also deals with the manufacturing and distribution of vehicle parts around the world. Together, the companies of JAMA hold a vast share of the markets in the United States, Europe, and many developing countries. JAMA also has offices located in Beijing (Beijing Office), Washington, D.C. (US Office) and Brussels, Belgium (Europe Office).

== Members of JAMA ==
JAMA
Chairman	Toyota	
Vice President	Honda	
Vice President	Yamaha	
Vice President	Suzuki	Also serves as auditor
Vice President	Isuzu	
Vice President	Japan Automobile Manufacturers Association	Also serves as director
Director	Subaru	
Director	Daihatsu	
Director	Nissan	Also serves as auditor
Director	Hino	
Director	Mazda	
Director	Mitsubishi	
Director	Fuso	
Director	UD	
Member	Kawasaki	

== Other brands of member companies ==
The "Big Three" of Japan (Toyota, Nissan, and Honda), each have luxury divisions: Honda's Acura (created in 1986), Nissan's Infiniti, and Toyota's Lexus (both created in 1989). Other than limited sales of the Infiniti Q45 these brands were only available outside Japan until 2005, when Lexus was introduced to the Japanese domestic market ("JDM"). Acura and Infiniti are also planned to be introduced into the Japanese domestic market by 2008. Toyota also began marketing some of its small domestic market cars in the United States under the Scion marque in 2003.

In Japan, there are also numerous small car manufacturers, coachbuilders, and tuning companies. Companies such as Mitsuoka, Spoon Sports, and HKS build production vehicles, sports cars, or one-off concepts in much smaller quantities than the major carmakers, therefore they are not included in JAMA.

== Automated Driving Safety Evaluation Framework ==
Trying to find a common methodology to deal the safety of automated driving solutions, JAMA released its first guidelines for evaluating the safety of automated driving systems (ADS) in 2022.

Currently the latest version is version 4.0.

=== Background and Objectives ===
The framework was established to provide an optimized, transparent, and technically consistent structure for the safety argumentation of automated driving systems. The project focuses on standardizing evaluation and determination methods and to serve as a guideline for evaluating and verifying safety throughout each phase of the development process—including planning, design, and evaluation—in order to improve both safety and to improve development efficiency.

By defining these guidelines, JAMA aims to foster a common technical understanding that serves as a foundational reference for international regulations and global collaborative projects in the automotive industry.

=== Functional Scenarios ===
The framework also defines functional scenarios that are required alongside methods to evaluate and success criteria for the AV in the scenarios.

The scenarios are defined as logical or abstract scenarios alongside some parameters spaces, which allows them to be translated into thousands or more concrete scenarios.

The scenarios are divided into 3 categories:

- Perception disturbance,
- Traffic disturbance
- Vehicle-dynamics disturbance

The categories were chosen according to the three elements of driving behavior: perception, decision, and operation

Starting from version 3.0 the framework included the definition of 58 distinct functional scenarios.

These scenarios are derived from a multi-dimensional matrix that integrates road geometry (straight, merge, branch, or intersection), ego-vehicle behavior (lane keeping, lane changing, or turning), and three groups for the actions of surrounding traffic:

- straight driving: same-direction acceleration/deceleration, crossing, or opposing traffic)
- lane change (cut-in or cut-out) ,swerving
- turning (same-direction or opposing U-turn, right or left turn)

Version 4.0 included the same number of scenarios, but enhanced them, mainly around VRUs.

=== Versions ===
List of Versions
Version	Release Date	Description
1.0	October 30, 2020	Initial version
2.0	December 28, 2021	Addition of Annexes
3.0	January 15, 2023	Revision related to traffic-disturbance scenarios removing restrictions on road types
4.0	March 1, 2026	Revision related to VRUs

=== Influence on ISO ===
While the framework is mainly used by Japanese carmakers, it also served as the basis of the ISO 34502 standard, making an international impact on the development of automated driving systems

== See also ==
- Chamber of commerce
- List of employer associations
- Japanese automobile industry
