= Weetalabah, New South Wales =

Weetalibah is a village in central eastern New South Wales, Australia, 580 km north-northwest from Sydney at an altitude of about 141 m above sea level.

The 2146ha Weetalibah Nature Reserve was created in August 1968.
