= List of automobile manufacturers of Japan =

This is a list of current and defunct automobile manufacturers of Japan.

== Major current manufacturers Japan ==
Company	Sub Brand	Notes
Fuso (1932 –present)		
Honda (1946–present)	Acura	
Isuzu (1853–present; spun off from IHI in 1916)	UD Trucks (1935–present) J-Bus (2002–present)	
Mazda (1920–present) (5% Toyota)		Following are the former sub brands of Mazda: Autorama; Autozam ɛ̃fini Eunos; Xedos
Mitsubishi (1873–1950; 1964–present)	NMKV (2011–present)	
Nissan (formerly Datsun) (1933–present)	Infiniti (1989–present)	Datsun (formerly Kaishinsha Motorcar Works) (1925–1986; 2013–2022); Kaishinsha Motorcar Works (1911–1925)
Subaru (formerly Nakajima Aircraft Company) (1945–present) (20% Toyota)		
Suzuki (1909–present) (5% Toyota)		
Toyota (1937–present, engineers from Hakuyosha Co. (1912–1929) entered Toyota Industries after Hakuyosha's dissolution, spun off from Toyota Industries in 1937)	Daihatsu (1907–present)	Following are the former sub brands of Toyota: Scion (2003–2016); Toyota WiLL (2000–2005)
Toyota (1937–present, engineers from Hakuyosha Co. (1912–1929) entered Toyota Industries after Hakuyosha's dissolution, spun off from Toyota Industries in 1937)	Century (2025–present)	Following are the former sub brands of Toyota: Scion (2003–2016); Toyota WiLL (2000–2005)
Toyota (1937–present, engineers from Hakuyosha Co. (1912–1929) entered Toyota Industries after Hakuyosha's dissolution, spun off from Toyota Industries in 1937)	Hino (1910–present)	Following are the former sub brands of Toyota: Scion (2003–2016); Toyota WiLL (2000–2005)
Toyota (1937–present, engineers from Hakuyosha Co. (1912–1929) entered Toyota Industries after Hakuyosha's dissolution, spun off from Toyota Industries in 1937)	Lexus (1989–present)	Following are the former sub brands of Toyota: Scion (2003–2016); Toyota WiLL (2000–2005)

== Other manufacturers ==
- Ales (see Otomo)
- Asahi (1937–c.1939)
- Aspark (2014–present)
- Atsuta (1930s)
- Autobacs (1947–present)
- Auto Sandal (1954)
- Art and Tech
- BS Motor
- Chiyoda (see Isuzu) (c.1932–1935)
- Cony (1961–1966)
- DAT
- Dome (1975–present)
- Fuji (1957–1958)
  - Cabin
- Fuso
- GLM (2010–present)
- Gorham (1920–1922)
- Hope
- Humbee (1947–1962)
- Isaka
- Jiotto (1989–1992)
- Kawasaki
- Kunisue.
- Kurogane (1935–1962)
- Lila (1923–1927)
- Meihatsu
- Meiwa (1952–c.1956)
- Mikasa (1957–1961)
- Mitaka
- Mitsui
- Mitsuoka (1981–present)
- Mizuno-shiki
- Nikken
- NJ (1952–1956)
- Ohmiya
- Ohta (1922; 1934–1957)
- Otomo (1924–1927)
- Prince (1955–1967)
- Publica
- Rintaku
- Sanko
- Showa Corporation
- Sivax
- Sumida (1933–1937)
- Suminoe (1954–1955)
- Tachikawa
- Takeoka (1990–present)
- Takuri (1907–1909)
- Tama (1947–1951)
- TGE
- Tommy Kaira (1996–1999)
- Tsukuba (1935–c.1937)
- Vemac
- Yamaha
- Yamata (1916)
- Yanase (1964–1965)
- Yoshida-shiki
- Y&T (1994–c.1996)

== See also ==
- List of automobile manufacturers
- List of automobile marques
- List of Asian automobile manufacturers
- Timeline of Japanese automobiles
- Eliica
