= Mitsubishi KE engine =

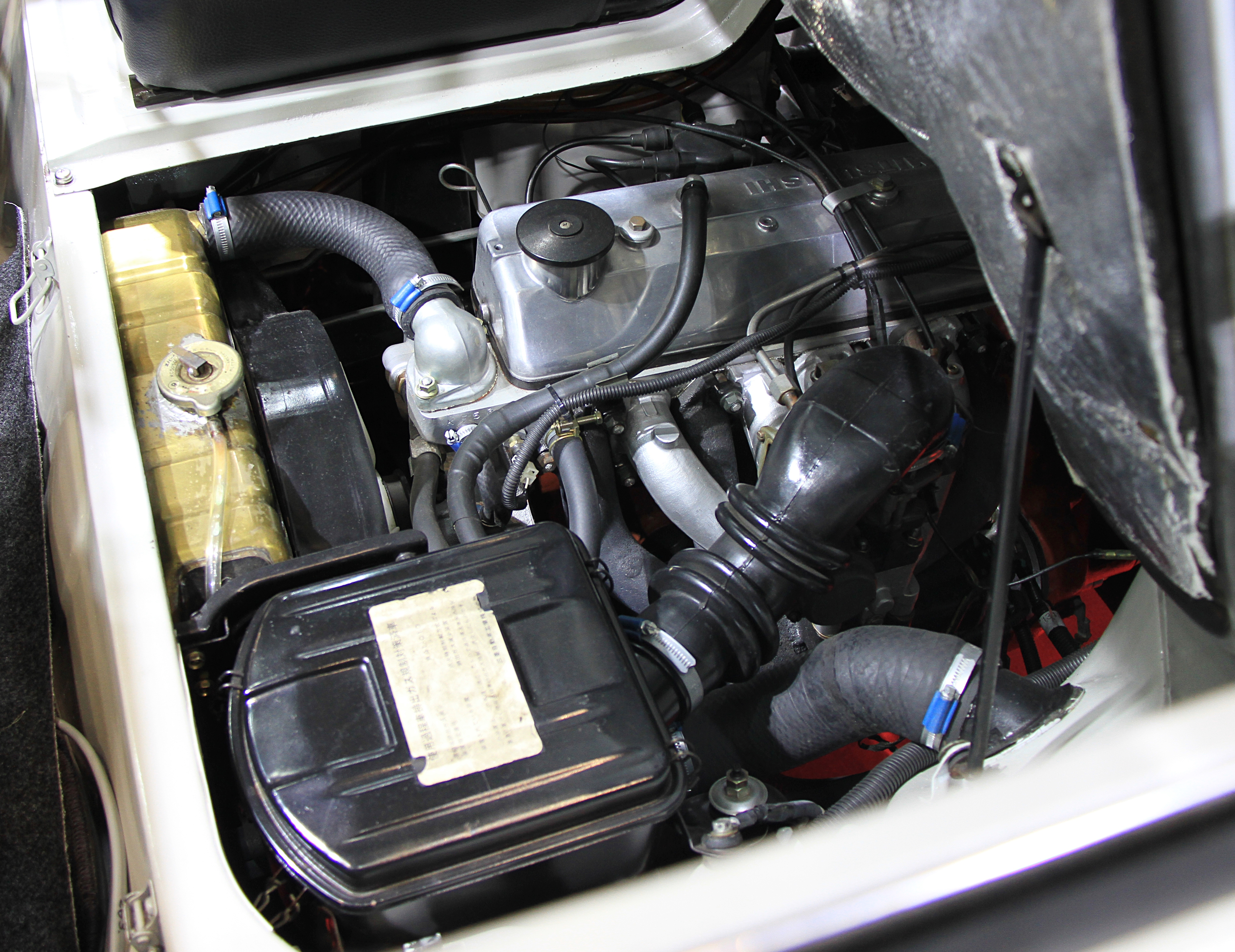

Overview
- Manufacturer: Mitsubishi Motors
- Production: 1963–1975

Layout
- Configuration: Straight-4 & Straight-6
- Displacement: 1.0–3.5 L (977–3,520 cc)
- Cylinder bore: 72 mm (2.83 in); 73 mm (2.87 in); 80 mm (3.15 in); 82 mm (3.23 in); 84 mm (3.31 in); 85 mm (3.35 in)
- Piston stroke: 60 mm (2.36 in); 65 mm (2.56 in); 66 mm (2.6 in); 71 mm (2.8 in); 90 mm (3.54 in); 102 mm (4.02 in); 111.1 mm (4.37 in)
- Cylinder block material: Iron
- Cylinder head material: Iron
- Valvetrain: OHV & SOHC 2 valves x cyl.

Combustion
- Fuel system: SU Carburettor; Fuel injection
- Fuel type: Gasoline, Diesel
- Cooling system: Water-cooled

Output
- Power output: 51–106 PS (38–78 kW)
- Torque output: 9.6–21.5 kg⋅m (94–211 N⋅m; 69–156 lb⋅ft)

The Mitsubishi KE engine is a range of engines produced by Mitsubishi Motors during the 1960s and early 1970s. They were extensively used in the various Colt-branded vehicles the company produced from 1963.

The engines were overhead valve iron-blocks, for gasoline and diesel use. The first digit after the KE denotes the number of cylinders, straight-4s becoming KE4 and six-cylinder versions such as the single overhead camshaft 2.0 L straight-6 which was developed in 1964 for the new Mitsubishi Debonair flagship sedan, receiving the KE6 prefix. The last digit is simply a serial, denoting which number engine it is. Some of these engines, such as the two-liter KE42, were further developed into overhead-cam engines and were named Astron.

As a large scale manufacturer, Mitsubishi had a wealth of experience building engines, both gasoline and diesel, in V and straight engine block configurations during the war. One of their many examples was the air-cooled A6120VDe air-cooled inline 6-cylinder 14.4 L diesel and the SA12200VD air-cooled V-12 diesel (21.7 litres).

== Specifications ==
=== KE41 ===
The KE41 is a diesel engine sharing the dimensions of the KE42 petrol unit.

Engine type "Jupiter"	Inline four-cylinder OHV
Displacement	2.0 L (1,995 cc)
Bore x stroke	84 mm × 90 mm (3.31 in × 3.54 in)
Fuel type	Diesel
Peak power	70 PS (51 kW) at 4,200 rpm
Applications	1963–1966 Mitsubishi Jupiter Junior (T50)

=== KE42 ===
The petrol-powered KE42 was first used in the Mitsubishi Jupiter Junior truck beginning in 1963. In 1973, the KE42 was upgraded to meet new emissions regulations and received the MCA (Mitsubishi Clean Air) name to reflect this. Power also increased by 5 hp (4 kW). This engine was developed into an overhead-cam unit, called the Astron 4G52.

Engine type	Inline four-cylinder OHV
Displacement	2.0 L (1,995 cc)
Bore x stroke	84 mm × 90 mm (3.31 in × 3.54 in)
Fuel type	Regular gasoline
Peak power	90 PS (66 kW) at 4,800 rpm 95 PS (70 kW)
Applications	1963–1966 Mitsubishi Jupiter Junior (T51), 1968–1973 Canter T91, 1973–1975 Canter T200

=== KE43 ===
Engine type	Inline four-cylinder OHV
Displacement	1.0 L (977 cc)
Bore x stroke	72 mm × 60 mm (2.83 in × 2.36 in)
Fuel type	Regular gasoline
Peak power	51 PS (38 kW) at 6,000 rpm, 1963-1965 Colt 1000 sedan/van 55 PS (40 kW) at 6,000 rpm, 1966 Colt 1000 sedan, all Colt 1000F
Applications	1963–1966 Colt 1000, 1966–1969 Colt 1000F

=== KE44 ===
Engine type	Inline four-cylinder OHV
Displacement	1.1 L (1,088 cc)
Bore x stroke	73 mm × 65 mm (2.87 in × 2.56 in)
Fuel type	Regular gasoline
Peak power	58 PS (43 kW) at 6,000 rpm 62 PS (46 kW) at 6,000 rpm (1969-1970 non-Sports Colt 11-F); 73 PS (54 kW) at 6,300 rpm (Twin-carb Super Sports, only in Fastback models)
Applications	1966–1968 Colt 1100, 1968–1970 Colt 1100F/11-F, 1968–1974 Delica T100

=== KE45 ===
Engine type	Inline four-cylinder OHV
Displacement	1.5 L (1,498 cc)
Bore x stroke	85 mm × 66 mm (3.35 in × 2.60 in)
Fuel type	Regular gasoline
Peak power	70 PS (51 kW); 85 PS (63 kW) (Super Sports, twin SU Carburettors)
Applications	1965–1969 Colt 1500, 1968-1969 Colt 1500 Super Sports

=== KE46 ===
Engine type	Inline four-cylinder OHV
Displacement	1.2 L (1,189 cc)
Bore x stroke	73 mm × 71 mm (2.87 in × 2.80 in)
Fuel type	Regular gasoline
Peak power	62 PS (46 kW) at 6,000 rpm
Peak torque	9.6 kg⋅m (94 N⋅m; 69 lb⋅ft) at 3,800 rpm
Applications	1968-1970 Colt 1200

=== KE47 ===
The KE47 was largely replaced by the 2.4 liter Astron 4G53 in 1975.

Engine type	Inline four-cylinder OHV
Displacement	2.32 L (2,315 cc)
Bore x stroke	85 mm × 102 mm (3.35 in × 4.02 in)
Fuel type	Regular gasoline
Peak power	95 PS (70 kW) at 4,500 rpm 100 PS (74 kW) (1973-1975)
Peak torque	17.5 kg⋅m (172 N⋅m; 127 lb⋅ft) at 2,800 rpm
Applications	1968-1975 Mitsubishi Canter T90, T200, Jeep, Rosa

=== KE63 ===
Engine type	Inline six-cylinder
Displacement	3.5 L (3,520 cc)
Bore x stroke	82 mm × 111.1 mm (3.23 in × 4.37 in)
Fuel type	Diesel
Peak power	92 PS (68 kW) at 3,500 rpm
Peak torque	21.5 kg⋅m (211 N⋅m; 156 lb⋅ft) at 2,000 rpm
Applications	1963–1968 (?) Mitsubishi Rosa

=== KE64 ===
Derived from the four-cylinder KE43 engine, the bore of the KE64 was increased by 8 mm, giving it an overall displacement of 1,991 cc (2.0 L). The valve layout is similar to Opel's cam-in-head design; the camshaft sits higher than in a regular pushrod engine, alongside the top-dead-center of the pistons, but not above the valves as in an overhead-cam engine. The valves are actuated by short tappets rather than pushrods, allowing for a low engine with some of the more free-revving, smoother characteristics of an SOHC engine.

Engine type	Inline six-cylinder OHV (high-mounted camshaft)
Displacement	2.0 L (1,991 cc)
Bore x stroke	80 mm × 66 mm (3.15 in × 2.60 in)
Fuel type	Regular gasoline
Peak power	105 PS (77 kW) at 5,000 rpm
Peak torque	16.5 kg⋅m (162 N⋅m; 119 lb⋅ft) at 3,400 rpm
Applications	1964–1970 Mitsubishi Debonair (exclusive)

=== KE65 ===
Engine type	Inline six-cylinder
Displacement	3.5 L (3,473 cc)
Bore x stroke	85 x 102mm
Fuel type	Diesel
Peak power	95 PS (70 kW) at ??00 rpm
Peak torque	??
Applications	1968 Mitsubishi Rosa, 1970 Mitsubishi Jupiter T44
