= Mitsubishi Colt 800 =

Mitsubishi Colt 800/1000F/1100F/11F
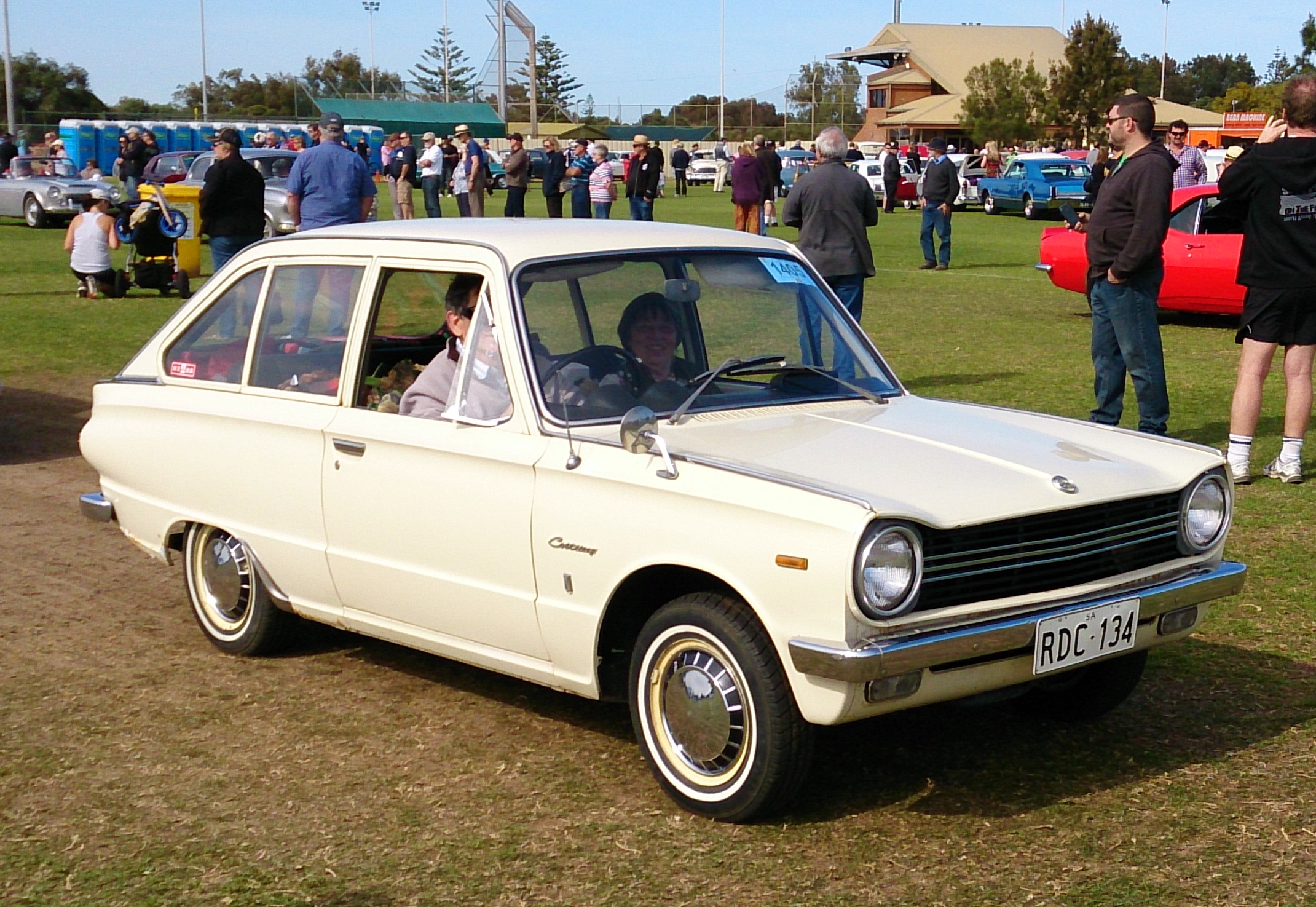
- Mitsubishi Colt 1100F Fastback

Overview
- Manufacturer: Mitsubishi Motors
- Production: 1965–1971
- Designer: Tsutomu Ieda, Munetaro Shigehiro, Ryu Kaibuchi

Body and chassis
- Body style: 2-door fastback 3-door liftback 4-door fastback 3-door wagon/van 2-door coupé utility/pickup
- Layout: Front-engine, rear-wheel drive

Powertrain
- Engine: 843 cc 2-stroke I3; 977 cc KE43 OHV I4; 1,088 cc KE44 OHV I4

Dimensions
- Wheelbase: 2,200 mm (86.6 in)
- Length: 3,620–3,740 mm (142.5–147.2 in)
- Width: 1,450 mm (57.1 in)
- Height: 1,365–1,420 mm (53.7–55.9 in)

The Mitsubishi Colt 800 is the first of a series of passenger cars with a fastback/hatchback design produced by Mitsubishi Motors from November 1965. It was introduced as a two-door fastback sedan, the first such design in the Japanese market. The series was discontinued in 1971, after the introduction of the company's Galant sedan but without a real replacement.

== Colt 800 ==
The 800 was powered by a three-cylinder two-stroke engine of 843 cc capacity producing 45 PS (33 kW). This made it more powerful than the projected competitor, Toyota's 700 cc Publica. Equipped with a four-speed manual gearbox and weighing a scant 750 kg, top speed was 120 km/h (75 mph). While it may have looked like a hatchback, the 800 was never available with a rear hatch. However, both a coupe utility version ("ute" in Australia, where many of these were sold) and a wagon ("Van" in Japanese parlance) were marketed. The Van was clearly based on the ute, with a horizontally split rear tailgate and workmanlike interior.

Mitsubishi gave up on the two-stroke engine in 1968, pushing the new four-stroke Colt 1000F instead. Customers across the world were beginning to steer away from cars with these types of engines and new stricter emissions standards were looming. The similarly sized and-engined Suzuki Fronte 800 was discontinued without replacement around the same time; these two were the last Japanese two-strokes bigger than a Kei car. In general, the 700-800 cc class was dying away in Japan at this time, being replaced by 1000 cc cars.

== Colt 1000F ==
In September 1966 the two-stroke 800 engine was complemented by the larger four-stroke 977 cc pushrod powerplant (KE43) from the more traditional Colt 1000. 800 production ended in the last months of 1968, shortly after the introduction of the 1100. The engine in the Colt 1000F, "F" for "Fastback" to set it apart from its stodgier sedan counterpart, produced 55 PS (40 kW). In August 1967, the 1000F finally received the lifting tailgate that the car's design had always promised. The hatchback also had the added benefit of a larger rear window, as such a design would no longer encroach on the boot opening. There was also a Colt 1000F Van model, with round taillights and the same engine specifications as the sedan. The 1000F remained in production until May 1969, after which only 1.1-liter models were available.

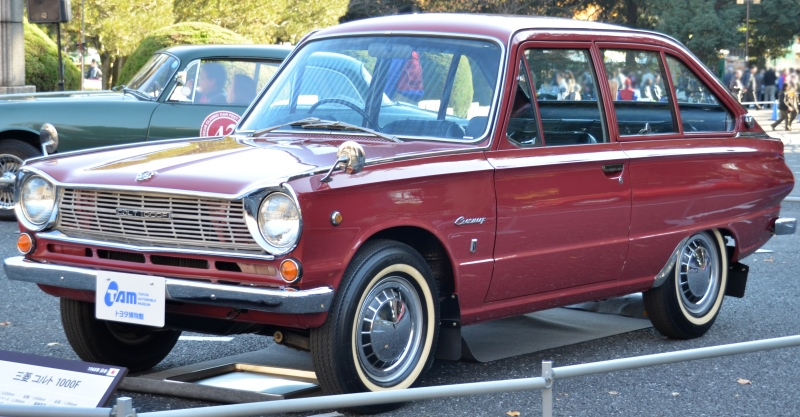
Mitsubishi Colt 1000F

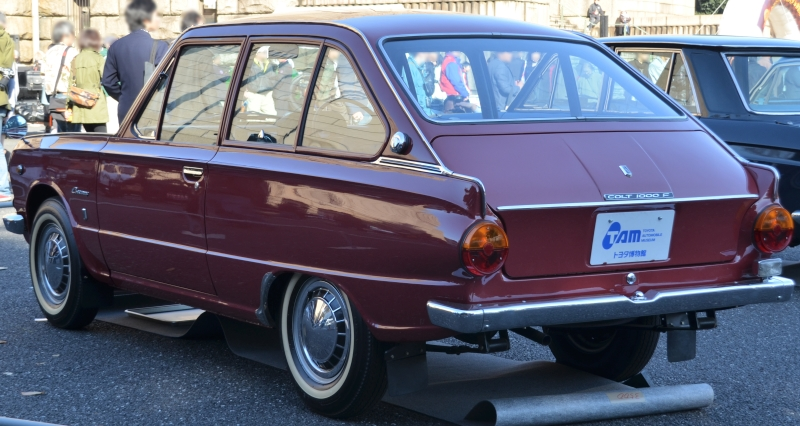
Mitsubishi Colt 1000F

=== Competition ===
The Colt 1000F became Mitsubishi's first ever rally car. The company which would go on to score multiple World Rally Championships and Dakar Rally wins began with an unexpected class victory, and fourth place overall, in the 1967 Southern Cross Rally in Australia with a 1000F fastback.

== Colt 1100F ==
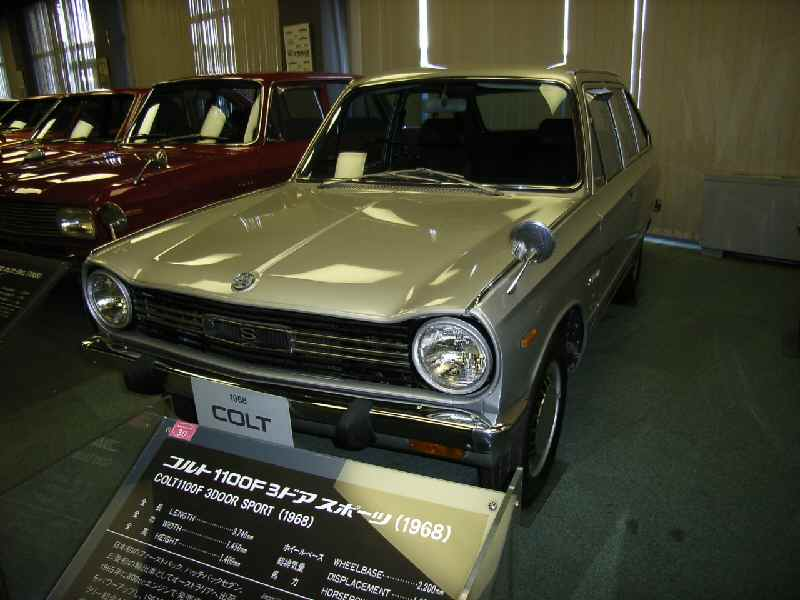
Mitsubishi Colt 1100F Sports at the Mitsubishi Motors Museum

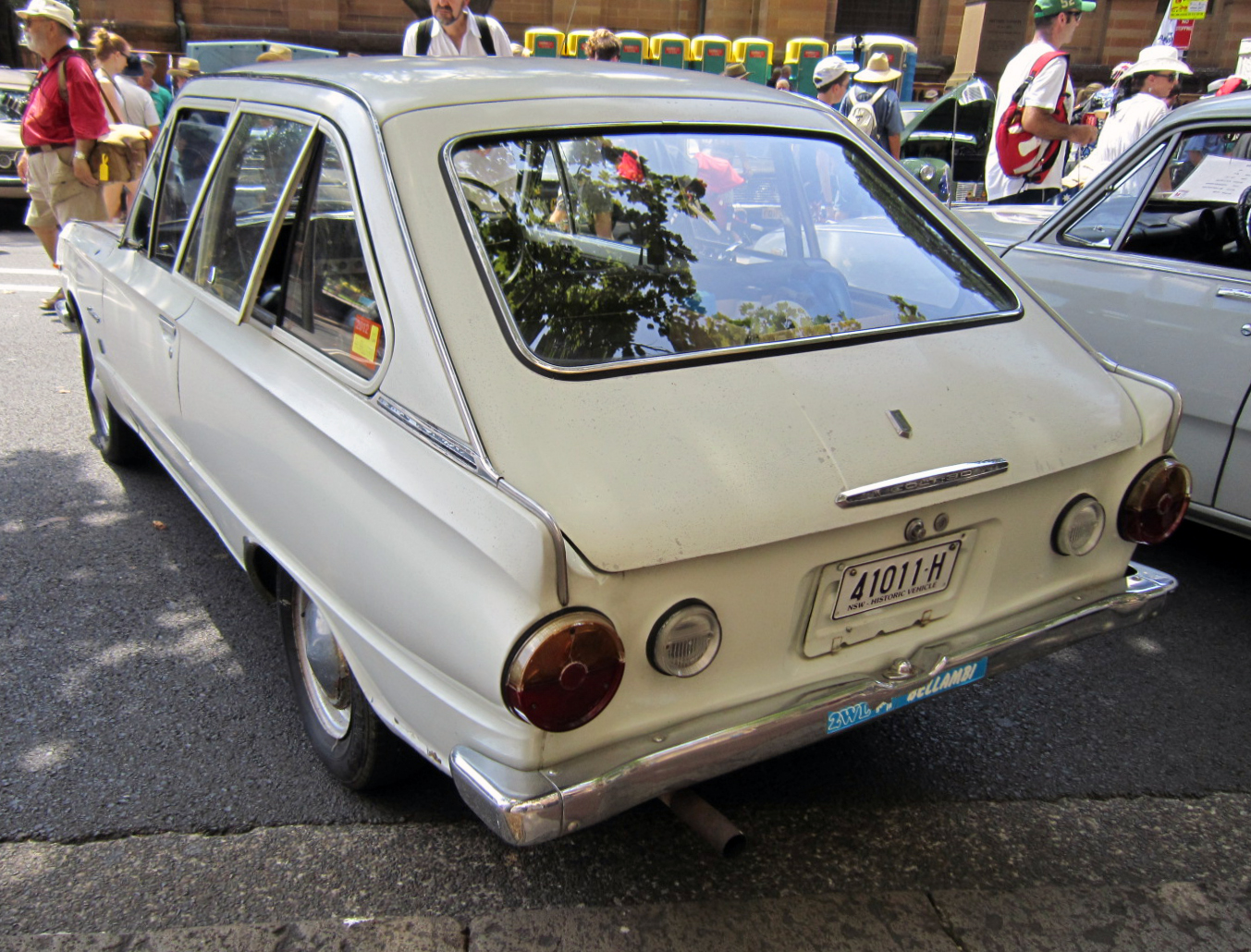
Colt 1100F three-door, rear view, showing the larger tailglass

In August 1968, the Colt F received the 58 PS (43 kW) engine from the Colt 1100 sedan and became the Colt 1100F. This also marked the introduction of a four-door version with a fastback styled rear but again without a tailgate. This four-door bodywork was only ever available with the 1.1-litre engine. Top speed was 140 km/h (87 mph) while the 400-meter sprint took 19.7 seconds. A 155 km/h (96 mph), 73 PS (54 kW), twin-carb "Super Sport" version also appeared in October 1968. The Super Sport was able to go one better than its Colt 1000 sibling: 1100Fs finished third overall (and first and second in class) at the 1968 Southern Cross Rally. In 1968 a Colt 1100F two-door was brought over to the United Kingdom for evaluation, and was also tested by Car Magazine. They praised the revvy engine and the sturdy suspension, but considered the car cramped and said that the ride was bouncy and inclined to pitch. The Colt also had a very quiet engine, with very little road and wind noise. In the end nothing came of it, and Mitsubishi (as the Colt Car Company) stayed out of the UK until 1974.

== Colt 11-F (A82) ==
In May 1969 the lineup was revamped and renamed the Colt 11-F (chassis code A82), as the one-litre models were dropped. The 11-F lost the peculiar top-hinged rear side windows, instead getting a single, large piece which opened by swinging out. The grille was also new. The "cooking" versions (Standard, DeLuxe, Super DeLuxe) came with a 62 PS (46 kW) version of the pushrod KE44 engine, and was available with all five different bodystyles. The 11-F Super Sports (shortened to 11-F SS in October for the 1970 model year, a version which also gained front disc brakes) received the same 73 hp engine as the previous Super Sports, and was available only in the two-door body. There was also a Sports version, featuring most Super Sports options but with the less powerful engine. Top speed of the SS was 155 km/h (96 mph), with the 400-meter sprint time being knocked down to 17.7 seconds. The Colt had drum brakes all around, with the fronts being of the twin-leading design.

The vans and pickups continued in production and received similar updates as did the sedans, albeit usually a couple of months later. The working vehicles did not have the "F" in their name, since they were not fastbacks, and were instead called Colt 11-Van and Colt Truck. The price of the updated Colt 11 Van actually dropped by around one percent, while the pickup's price remained stationary. The commercial models had the same 62 PS engine as did the regular Colts.

Production of the Colt 11-F ended in March 1971 (with sales continuing into October) without any true replacement, although the compact Galant FTO can be said to have taken up the Super Sports' mantle. Rallying duties had in any case already been passed to the Colt 1500 Super Sports.
