= Ales (automobile) =

The Ales was designed by engineer Junya Toyokawa, inventor of gyro-compasses for aircraft and boat control, and produced by Hakuyosha Ironworks Ltd, Tokyo, in 1921. The development of the two Ales experimental touring cars led to the production of the commercially sold 1924 Otomo. One was powered by a water-cooled, four-cylinder side-valve engine displacing 1610 cc, the other an air-cooled four-cylinder engine producing 780 cc.
