= Otomo (automobile) =

Japanese automobile

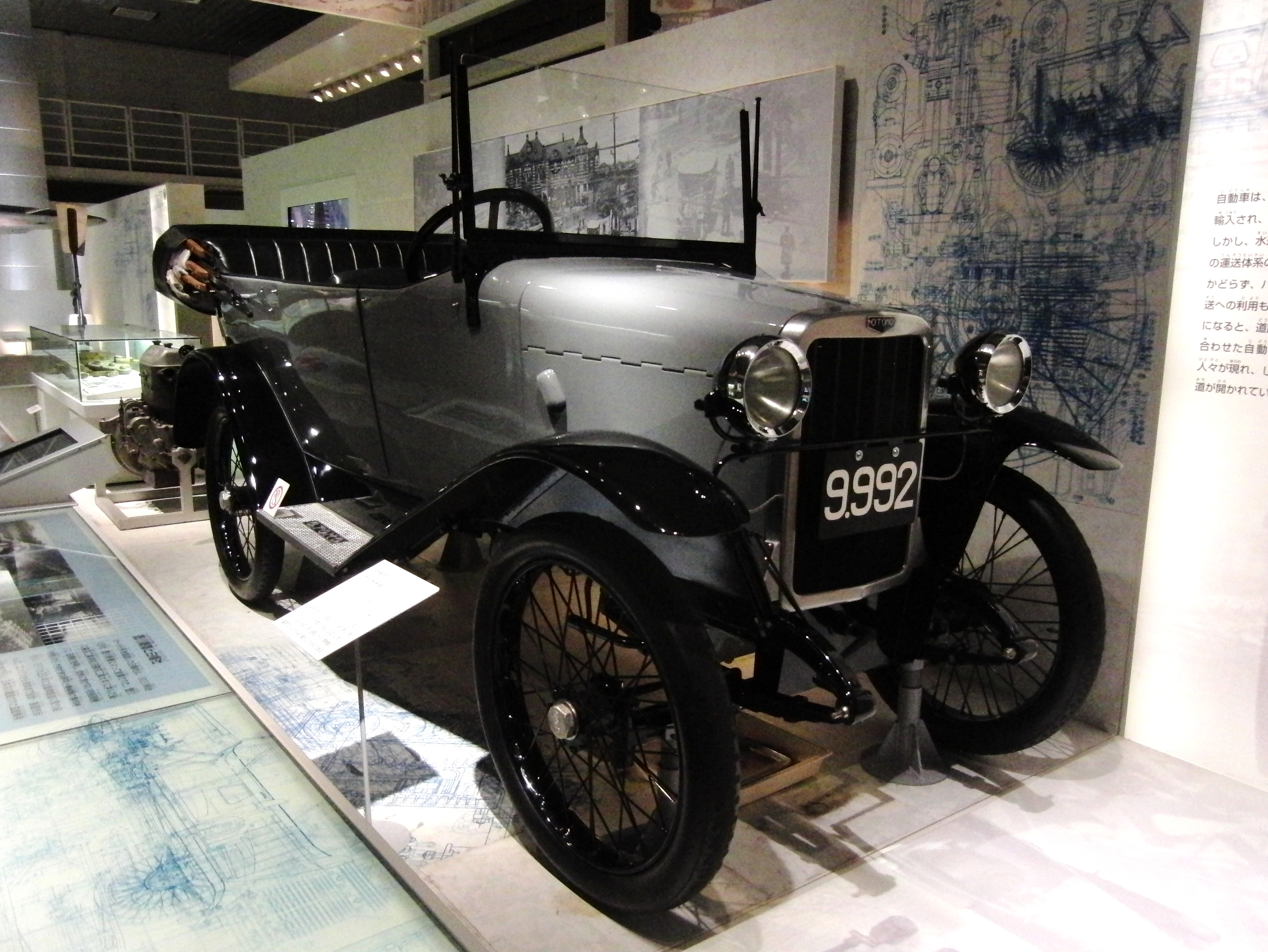
Otomo, reproduction. Exhibit in the National Museum of Nature and Science, Tokyo, Japan.

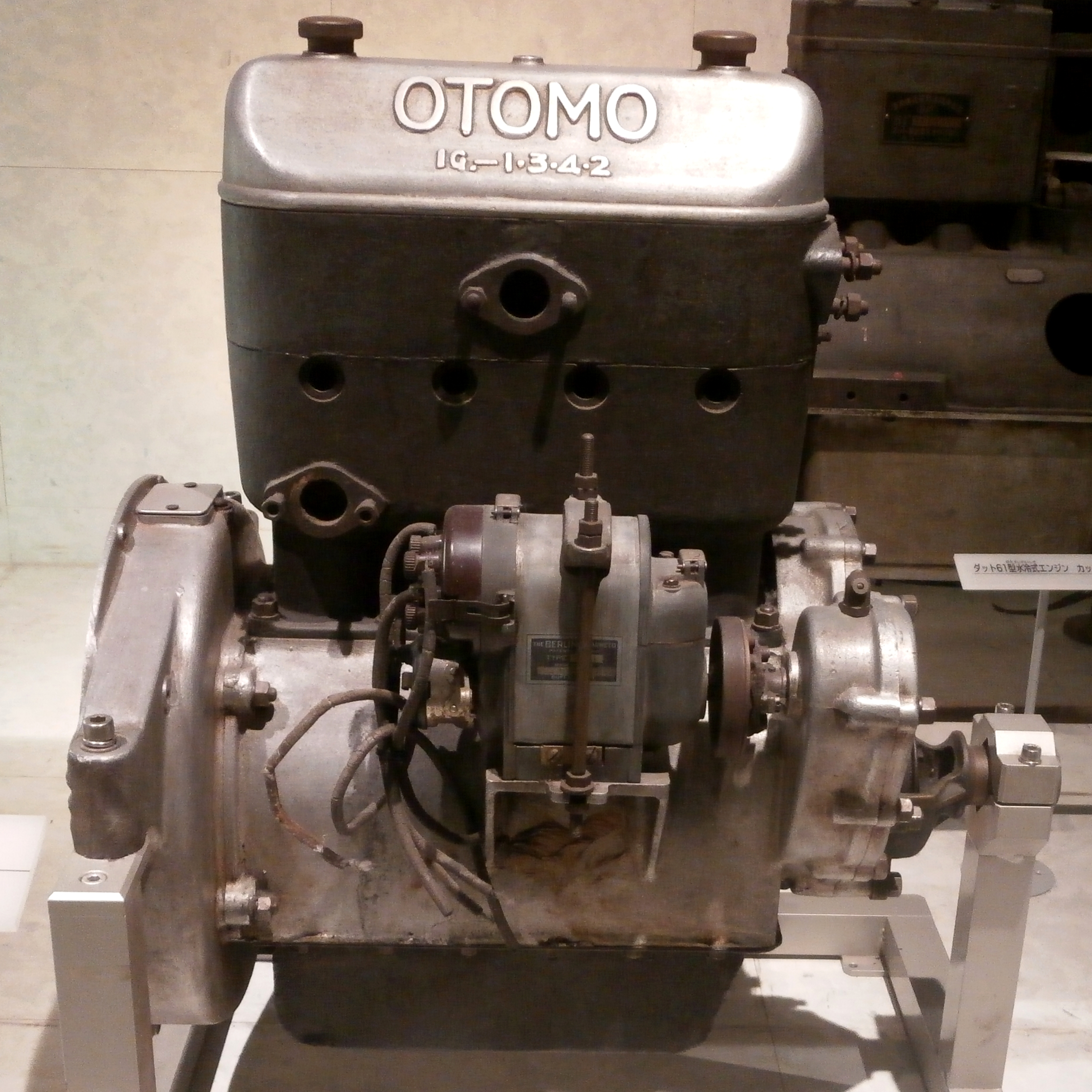
Engine of Otomo.

The Otomo was a Japanese automobile built by Mr. Hayataya Toyokawa from 1924 to 1927 at the Hakuyosha Ironworks in Tokyo. It was meant to build upon his experimental Ales cars of 1921. Otomo offered an air-cooled 944 cc four-cylinder light car, available as two- or four-seat tourer or saloon (sedan), or as a van. This was joined in 1926 by a water-cooled 24 hp model.

During this time, Otomo was one of only two Japanese automakers, joined by the Japanese established Gorham Automobile Company, financed by American aircraft engineer William R. Gorham. The remnants of the Gorham Automobile Company became the Nissan Motor Company Ltd. The car found it difficult to compete with Ford Model T's being manufactured at Yokohama, and Chevrolet Capitols being built at Osaka, and the company was integrated with other smaller Japanese automobile manufacturers. The 1923 Great Kantō earthquake also disrupted the local economy, with manufacturing resources greatly affecting business operations.
