= White cypress =

White cypress is a common name for several plants and may refer to the following:

- Callitris columellaris, also known as white cypress, a species of coniferous tree native to most of Australia
- Chamaecyparis thyoides, also known as Atlantic white cypress, a species of coniferous tree native to the Atlantic coast of North America
