= Kurogane Type 95 =

Japanese scout car

Type 95 "Yonki"
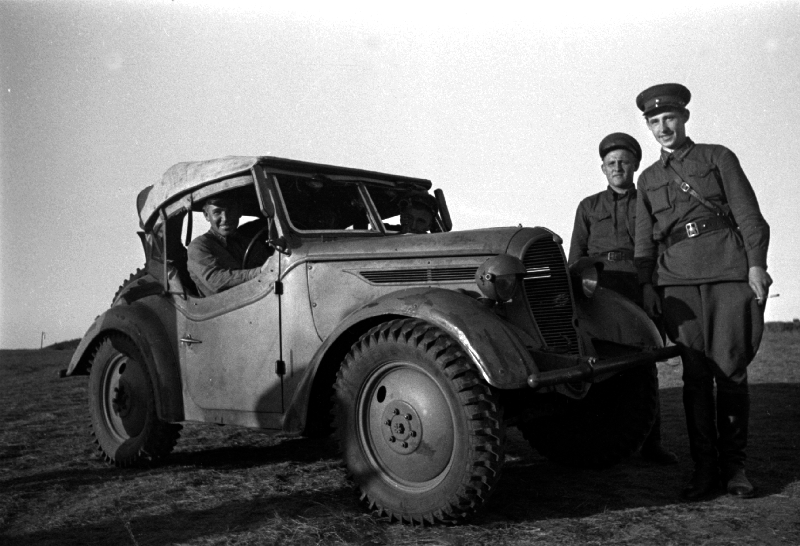
- Soviet soldiers posing with a captured Type 95 following the Battle of Khalkin-Gol

Overview
- Manufacturer: Tokyu Kogyo Kurogane
- Production: 1936–1944
- Assembly: Ōmori, Ōta, Tokyo, Japan
- Designer: Tetsuji Makita (蒔田鉄司)

Body and chassis
- Class: All-terrain vehicle
- Body style: 2-door roadster 2-door pickup truck 4-door phaeton
- Layout: Front-engine, four-wheel-drive layout

Powertrain
- Engine: 1.2 L (prototype); 1.3 L 1.4 L air-cooled, OHV 45° V-twin 2-cylinder engine

Dimensions
- Wheelbase: 2,000 mm (78.7 in)
- Length: 3,600 mm (141.7 in)
- Width: 1,520 mm (59.8 in)
- Height: 1,680 mm (66.1 in)
- Curb weight: 1,100 kg (2,425.1 lb)

The Type 95 was a Japanese scout car built by Tokyu Kurogane Industries (東急くろがね工業, Tōkyū Kurogane Kōgyō), and was used during the war with China and World War II in the East. Between 1936 and 1944 approximately 4,700 were built. It was the only completely Japanese designed reconnaissance car ever used by the Imperial Japanese Army, which tended to use civilian cars. Its nickname is the "Yonki" (よんき) which in Japanese means "all-wheel drive". In the field, soldiers often called it the "daruma" after the Buddhist symbol for good luck.

It is one of the world's first four-wheel drive passenger vehicle placed into mass production, prior to the Laffly V15 (1937-1938), the GAZ-61 (1938) and Willys MB "jeep" (1941).

The Type 95 accommodated three people - two in the front and one in the back. The two-cylinder, V-twin, four-stroke, air-cooled gasoline engine, which developed 33 PS (24 kW; 33 hp) at 3,300 rpm, was an advantage in cold climates found in China, and had 4-wheel drive, using a gearshift activated transfer case to engage the front wheels. It was manufactured without weapons and unarmored. It had advantages over the Type 97 motorcycle used by the Japanese Army, which had much less off-road mobility, and so limited troop mobility. It had tall wheels which helped it to travel over rough terrain, mud and snow.

== History ==
It was conceived in 1934 by the Japanese Imperial Army as a small rough terrain vehicle to do reconnaissance, deliver messages to the field, and transport personnel. The military asked Toyota, Hatsudoki Seizo, Rikuo Internal Combustion Engine, and Okamoto to collaborate with Kurogane to design and manufacture the new vehicle. Toyota MVD was building the Toyota G1, and Okamoto Bicycle and Automobile Manufacturing, was manufacturing bicycles for the Imperial Japanese Navy and was absorbed into Toyota in 1972. The prototype was the result, using a Japanese-built internal combustion engine. Mass-production began in 1936. At the time, military operations in Mainland China and Southeast Asia, a mass-produced military vehicle equipped with Japan's first four-wheel drive mechanism, increased mobility in the area's rough terrain. In 1934, Mitsubishi Heavy Industries had internally developed a prototype, four-door, four-wheel-drive sedan for personnel transport, called the Mitsubishi PX33, which was powered by a 6.7-litre four-cylinder diesel engine. Four prototypes were built before the project was cancelled.

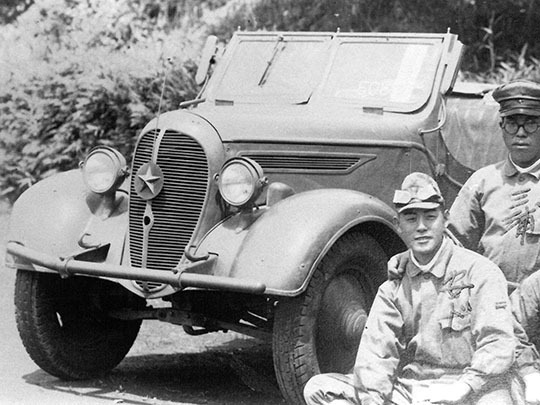
Kurogane Type 95

The United States Willys MB offered off-road ability and increased ground clearance, combined with a light truck approach to construction. The German Army had the Kübelwagen, a rear-wheel drive air-cooled vehicle based on the Volkswagen Type 1. The Type 95 was developed as a passenger car as a better alternative to motorcycle personnel transport, with four-wheel-drive advantages over the Type 93 motorcycle with a side car and the Type 97 motorcycle (a licensed copy of a Harley-Davidson motorcycle). Lightweight dirt bikes had not been invented yet.

In the 1930s, Japan's manufacturing infrastructure was less advanced than those of the US and Europe, and military manufacturing focused on ships and aircraft by Japan's premiere industrial manufacturer Mitsubishi, and armament and tank production by Mitsubishi's zaibatsu partners. Aircraft were largely built by Mitsubishi, Tachikawa Aircraft Company, and the Nakajima Aircraft Company which built most of the aircraft. Limited raw materials were also devoted to higher priorities. The goal was to build 5,000 Type 95 in a supporting role, largely by hand and without an assembly line.

This car was first used in the Nomonhan Incident, and later during the Pacific War and "Greater East Asia War" for its primary purpose, as well to carry mainland Army and Navy officer flagship passengers as a 4-door version. The front grille had the Imperial Japanese Army's five-pointed star which signified sakura ("cherry blossom"), which has special cultural significance. 4,775 cars were built with some minor changes, such as mechanical and body adjustments. Production ended in 1944.

== Development ==
The inventor of the four wheel drive and the engine used in the Type 95 is also the founder of the Japanese Internal Combustion Engine Company, Tetsuji Makita. Mr. Makita was one of Japan's first automobile engineers during the 1920s-1930s, and worked with Toyogawa Hayataya, who built the first automobile in Japan called the "Otomo" which was built by "Hakuyosha Ironworks, Inc." one of the first Japanese automobile manufacturers. Mr. Makita and the Japan Internal Combustion Engine Company had been at the time established as a leading manufacturer of the Japanese market automobiles, Auto rickshaws, and motorized tricycles, competing initially with Datsun and Mazda, with Mitsubishi and The Hope Automobile Company (later reorganized as Suzuki) after the war. To set themselves as leading-edge Japanese manufacturers, the term "New Era" was used to advertise new, in-house developed engines in 1926, to coincide with the end of the Emperor Taishō era that ushered in the Emperor Shōwa era. Through a series of company reorganizations, the company was later renamed Kurogane (The word kurogane (くろがね or 鉄) is an old term for iron).

The width of the vehicles was originally set at 1,300 mm (51.2 in), but to better cope with the center of gravity compared to the jeep and Schwimmwagen it was enhanced to 1,500 mm (59.1 in). It had a narrow steel cruciform ladder frame chassis, and a 2,000 mm (78.7 in) wheelbase. The rear axle was a solid differential, with a semi-elliptical leaf spring suspension, the front wheels used coil springs and a double wishbone independent front suspension to enhance off road agility. The transmission had three forward speeds and one reverse gear that powered the rear wheels. A transfer case was used to temporarily engage the front wheels when necessary. Drum brakes were used on the rear wheels only, and it had a 48 L (13 US gal; 11 imp gal) gas tank with 4 L (1 US gal; 1 imp gal) for reserve, achieving 13.18 km/L (37.2 mpg_{‑imp}; 31.0 mpg_{‑US}). Its top speed on paved roads was 75 km/h (46.6 mph), with a driving range of 450 kilometres (279.6 mi). To keep production and maintenance simple, universal joints were used to engage the front wheels.

During development, a horizontally opposed engine had been considered due to the harsh, cold conditions of Manchuria where the car would be deployed initially. The vehicle needed to be durable and easy to maintain, and a flat engine had advantages in the torque production needed to operate all four wheels. Air cooling also solved the problem of available cooling water and engine ruggedness. Kurogane also manufactured motorcycles, and keeping the engine as air-cooled helped with parts availability. The engine used for production was a Kurogane V1-AF motorcycle engine, with a bank angle of 45°, a V-type 2-cylinder OHV forced air-cooled engine with an engine displacement of 1.3 – 1.4 L developing 33 PS (24.3 kW; 32.5 bhp) at 3,300rpm. It was a simple design, while the British made Sunbeam Motorcycle may have been used in reference to its development. The Japan Internal Combustion Engine Company was building three-wheeler trucks and motorcycles, using a single-cylinder engine of their "JAC” brand “Zaimasu" model motorcycle (zaimasu means “I will be there”) as the base engine used to develop the V2 engine. The front grille had a small hole to insert a handcrank to manually start the engine should the starter or battery fail.

In the prototype development stage, it was originally an air-cooled single-cylinder, borrowing from their current motorcycle products, but a V-twin engine proved more practical. To aid in cooling, a forced air-cooling system used a propeller fan to further direct airflow across the cylinders without an encased cooling shroud, and it used a dry sump oil lubrication design. The carburetor was copied from a Wheeler-Schebler Carburetor Company design in a single barrel carburetor that was placed in the center behind the V-bank, distributing to the left and right cylinder bank, through a crossflow cylinder head. The engine was suspended above the front wheel differential and in front of the transmission. This arrangement gave the vehicle a higher center of gravity, helping to keep the engine out of river crossing conditions, with the disadvantage of higher engine vibration than a horizontally opposed engine layout. This trade-off met the primary goals set before the development team. Manufacturing was simple thanks to the symmetrical implementation with the engine directly in front of the transmission, with a transfer case providing power to the front wheels installed directly below the engine. Because assembly was almost by hand, minor changes were made to various aspects of the car as the need arose, with the early prototype two-door enclosed sedan evolving into a roadster. While some vehicles over time had body changes, many of the production cars were not installed with doors, and the canvas roof for the two-door and four-door vehicles aided in reducing overall weight and adding flexibility to conditions in the field.

== Versions ==
Some vehicles were modified in the field by front seat passengers opening the top hinged passenger side windshield up and using a light machine gun such as the Type 11 light machine gun, the Type 96 light machine gun, or the Type 99 light machine gun similar to a motorcycle sidecar. Because of its small size and weight, it was able to fit inside Japanese manufactured Kokusai Ku-8 airplane and deploying glider Airborne troops, specifically the Teishin gliding infantry regiment, and some cars also used an Autocannon machine gun.

There were several significant upgrades and design changes from the prototype to the final models build in 1944.

- 1935 prototype: Engine displacement 1200cc; Body styles: roadster and enclosed 2-door sedan; Rectangular front grille allows airflow to cool the engine; No bumper; Body on chassis frame.
- Production type A: produced 1937-1938. Engine displacement 1300cc; 3-person roadster type; Oval grille; Bumper.
- Production type B: produced 1939-1943; Engine displacement 1400cc; 4-person Phaeton type; Production volume most models; Square grille.
- Four-door prototype: 4-door that has been only one trial in 1939 Phaeton type. Wheelbase has an extended door of the original 2-door type; it is supposed that it was water-cooled to increase durability and engine efficiency. Square grille.
- Production type C: produced in 1944; engine displacement 1400cc; air-cooled; 2-person pickup truck.

== Extant examples ==
Between four and seven examples are known to exist:

- 1939 model discovered in 2013 in a repair shop in Kyoto. It was extensively restored at the request of Masahiko Kobayashi, at a cost of ¥13,240,000 of crowdfunded funds – approximately US$130,000 (equivalent to $174,397 in 2025). It was added to a Japanese military museum. The unveiling of the restored car with running engine is shown on video at the NHK World website.
- 1941 model displayed at the Motorcar Museum of Japan
- Unknown vintage at Retro Auto Museum in Moscow, Russia
- Unknown vintage model located in private hands in Pennsylvania, US
- Unknown vintage model, in advanced stages of decay on Babelthuap Island, Palau

== See also ==
- Tokyu Corporation
- Ohta Jidosha
- Mitsubishi PX33
