= Motorized tricycle (Philippines) =

Motorcycle with a passenger cab

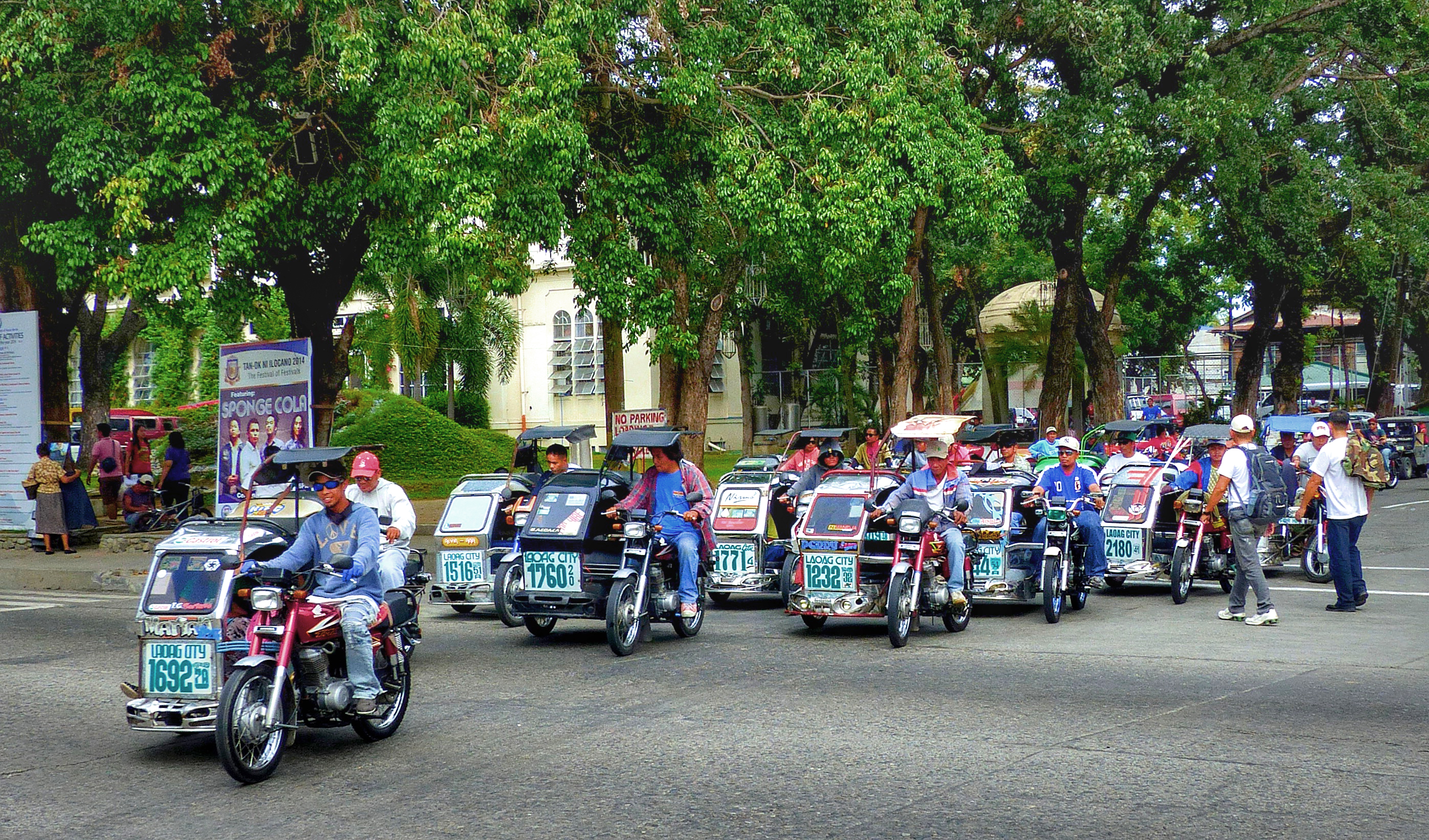
Tricycle drivers with their motorized tricycles in Laoag

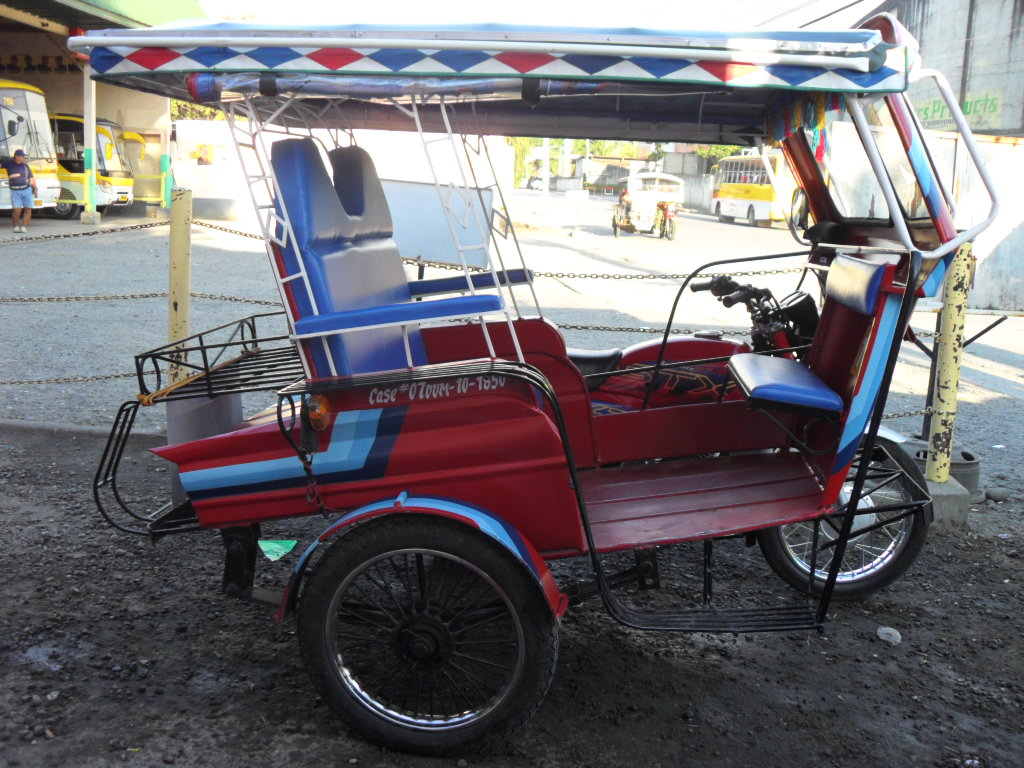
A motorized tricycle in Dumaguete

In the Philippines, motorized tricycles (or simply tricycles or trikes; Filipino: traysikel; Cebuano: traysikol) refer to a type of motorized vehicle consisting of a motorcycle and a passenger cab (ie, a sidecar) attached to it. Along with the jeepney, the Philippine tricycle is one of the most common means of public or private transportation in the country, especially in rural areas. These public utility vehicles either ply a set route or are for-hire, like taxis.

Philippine tricycles are built in a variety of styles, which differ from city to city, and are usually made locally by building a sidecar and affixing it to an imported motorcycle. Usually both the cycle and sidecar are covered, but not always by the same roof. Larger companies, such as Fitcor Marketing, also manufacture passenger tricycles. They are built with more seats, with the motor situated at the back rather than below the driver as per a motorcycle.

Philippine tricycles are often confused with the similar tuktuks and auto rickshaws of neighboring countries. Philippine tricycles evolved from motorcycles with sidecars used during World War 2 and are not derived from rickshaws. These tricycles also attach the passenger cab to the side of the motorcycle, in contrast to tuktuks, which are not motorcycles but factory-built three-wheelers. The motorela, a regional variant of the Philippine tricycle with a centered passenger cab enclosing the motorcycle, is the most visually similar to a tuktuk, but differs in that it has four wheels, not three. The passengers of a motorela also sit sideways rather than facing forward.

== Origin ==
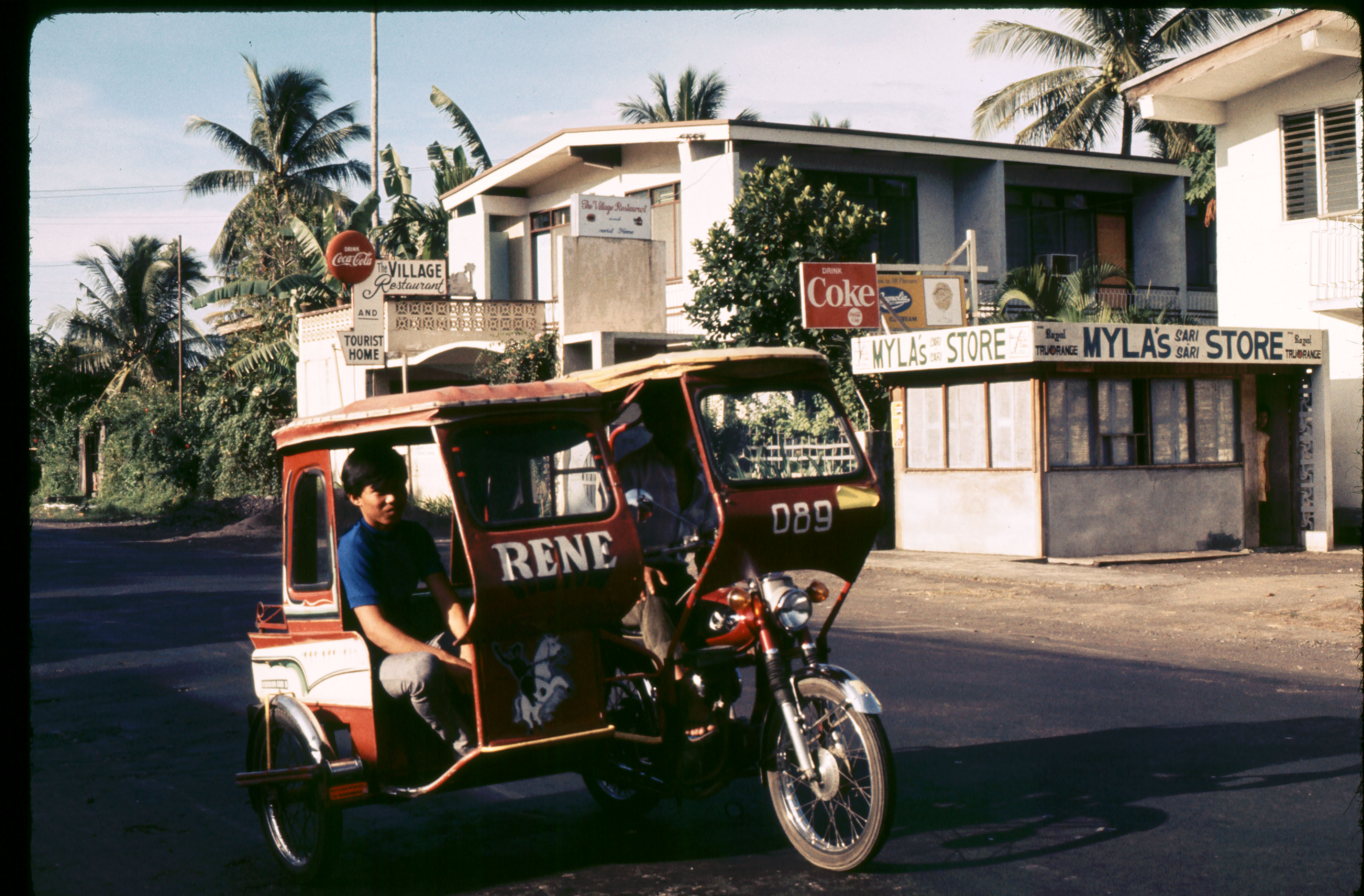
A tricycle in Legazpi, Albay, c. 1970

The exact date of the appearance of the tricycle in the Philippines is unknown, but it started appearing after World War 2. It is most likely derived from the Rikuo Type 97 military motorcycle used by the Imperial Japanese Army in the Philippines starting at 1941. The motorcycle was essentially a licensed copy of a Harley-Davidson with a sidecar. However, there is also another hypothesis which places the origin of the tricycle to the similarly built "trisikad", a human-powered cycle rickshaw built in the same configuration as the tricycle. However, the provenance of the trisikad is also unknown. Prior to the tricycles and trisikad, the most common means of mass public transport in the Philippines is a carriage pulled by horses or carabaos known as the kalesa (calesa or carromata in Philippine Spanish). The pulled rickshaw never gained acceptance in the Philippines. Americans tried to introduce it in the early 20th century, but it was strongly opposed by local Filipinos who viewed it as an undignified mode of transport that turned humans into "beasts".

== Passenger tricycles ==
Passenger tricycles can accommodate from four passengers up to as many as six or more, excluding the driver. Goods can be placed on the roof. One or two passengers can sit behind the driver while several more can sit in the sidecar, depending upon the design. Additional passengers can sit on the roof or stand hanging onto the side or back of the sidecar. In rainy weather, a tricycle will be completely enclosed in a heavy plastic covering.

Tricycles are often painted colorfully, like jeepneys.

Fares are less than taxi fares (if the city or municipality has taxis), yet more expensive than jeepney fares. Fares range from ₱10 to ₱250, depending on the locality and the distance to be ridden. Inside cities, tricycles often operate as shared taxis, where passenger fares are calculated per passenger and after the distance traveled. These fares are close to the fares of jeepneys. For longer journeys or in areas with heavy tourism, the driver will usually request that the passenger hire the whole tricycle and negotiate a "special fare", which will then be a private hire.

In many urban areas, tricycles are gradually being substituted with Indian-built tuk-tuks, known for their enhanced engines and spacious seating. Although not strictly classified as tricycles, these three-wheel vehicles are exempt from the tricycle ban on national highways, being treated separately from conventional tricycles. This exemption is due to their classification as three-wheelers rather than tricycles, allowing them to operate on national roads without restriction.

Another noteworthy improvement in tricycle technology is observed in Manila. It is fully electric and distributed by a local company with major Japanese partnership.

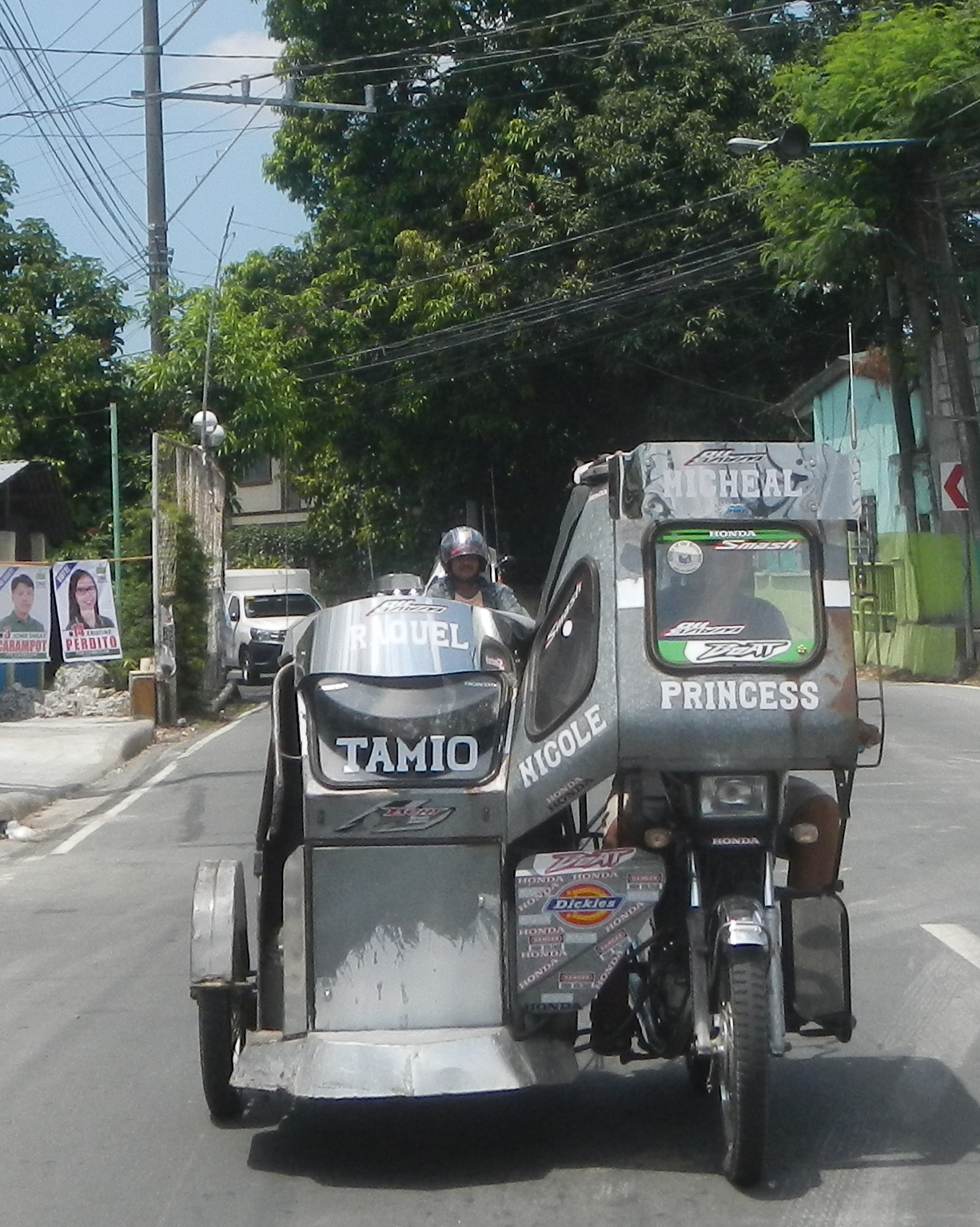
A motorized tricycle in General Trias, Cavite

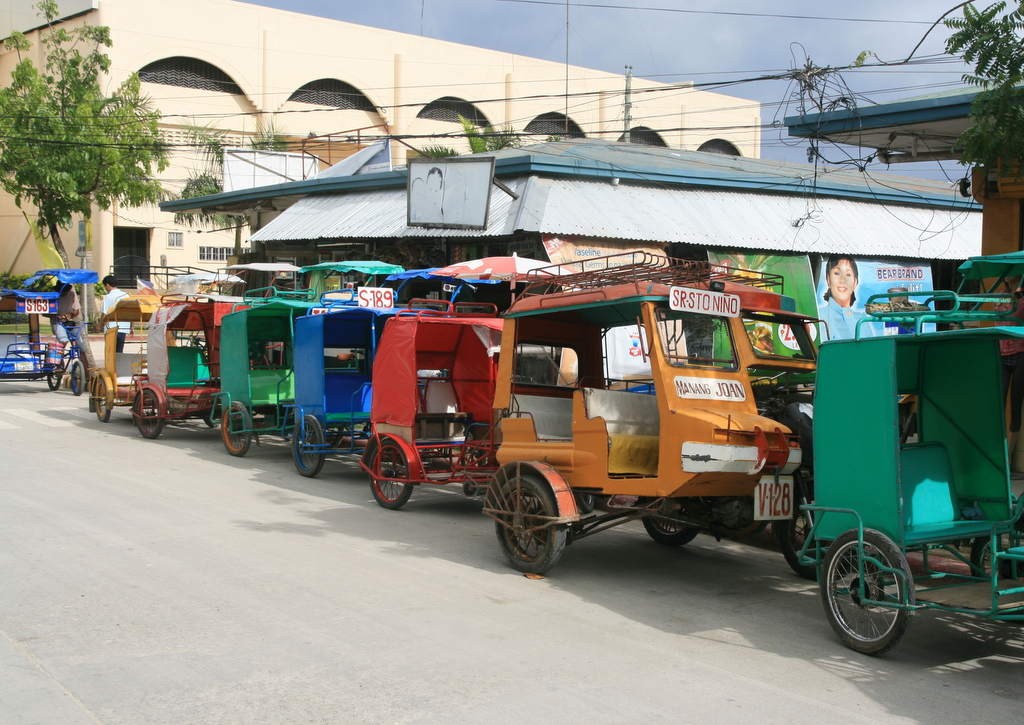
Motor tricycles for hire lined up outside public market in downtown Bantayan, Cebu

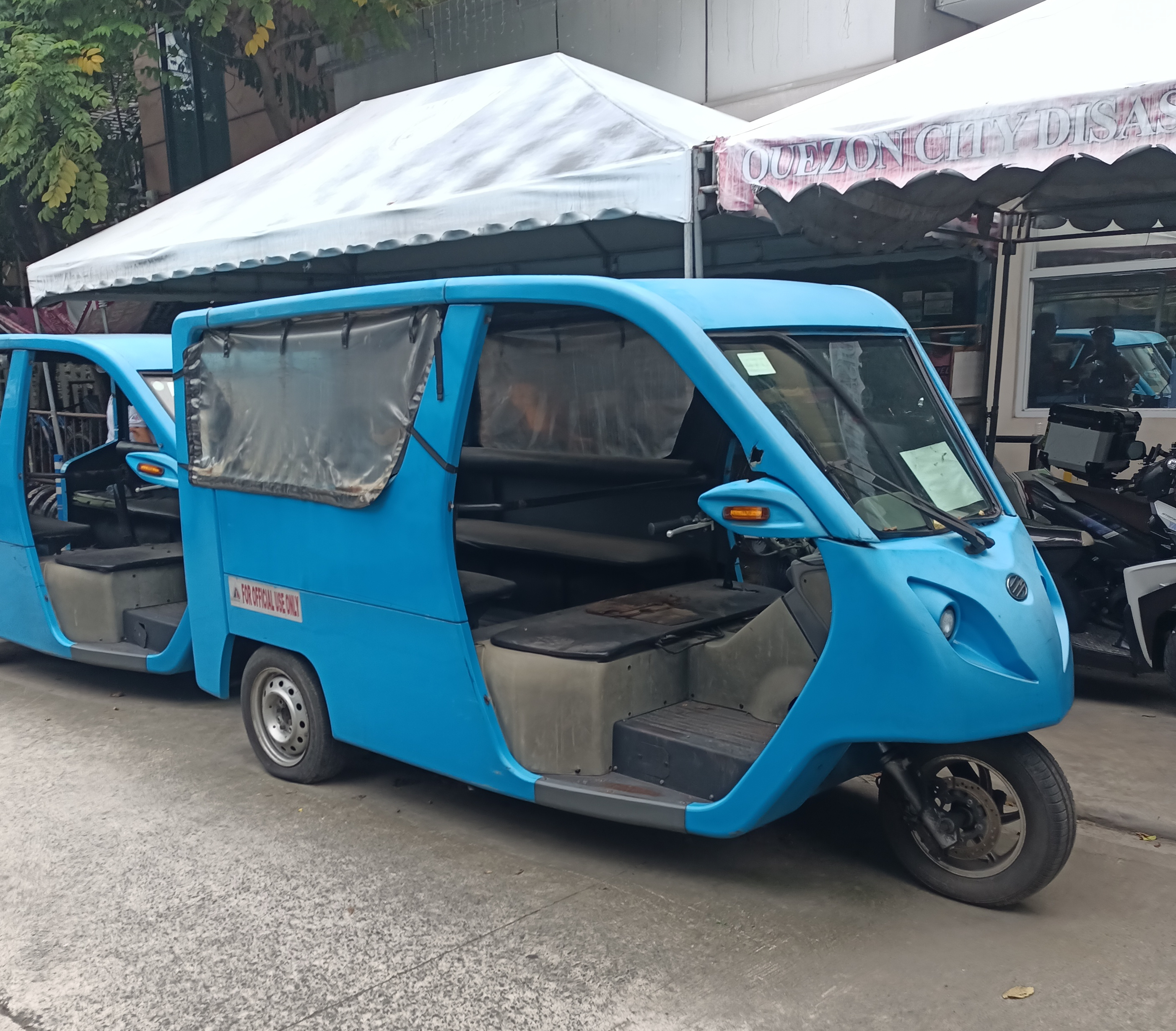
The BEMAC 68VM Passenger in Quezon City.

=== Motorela ===
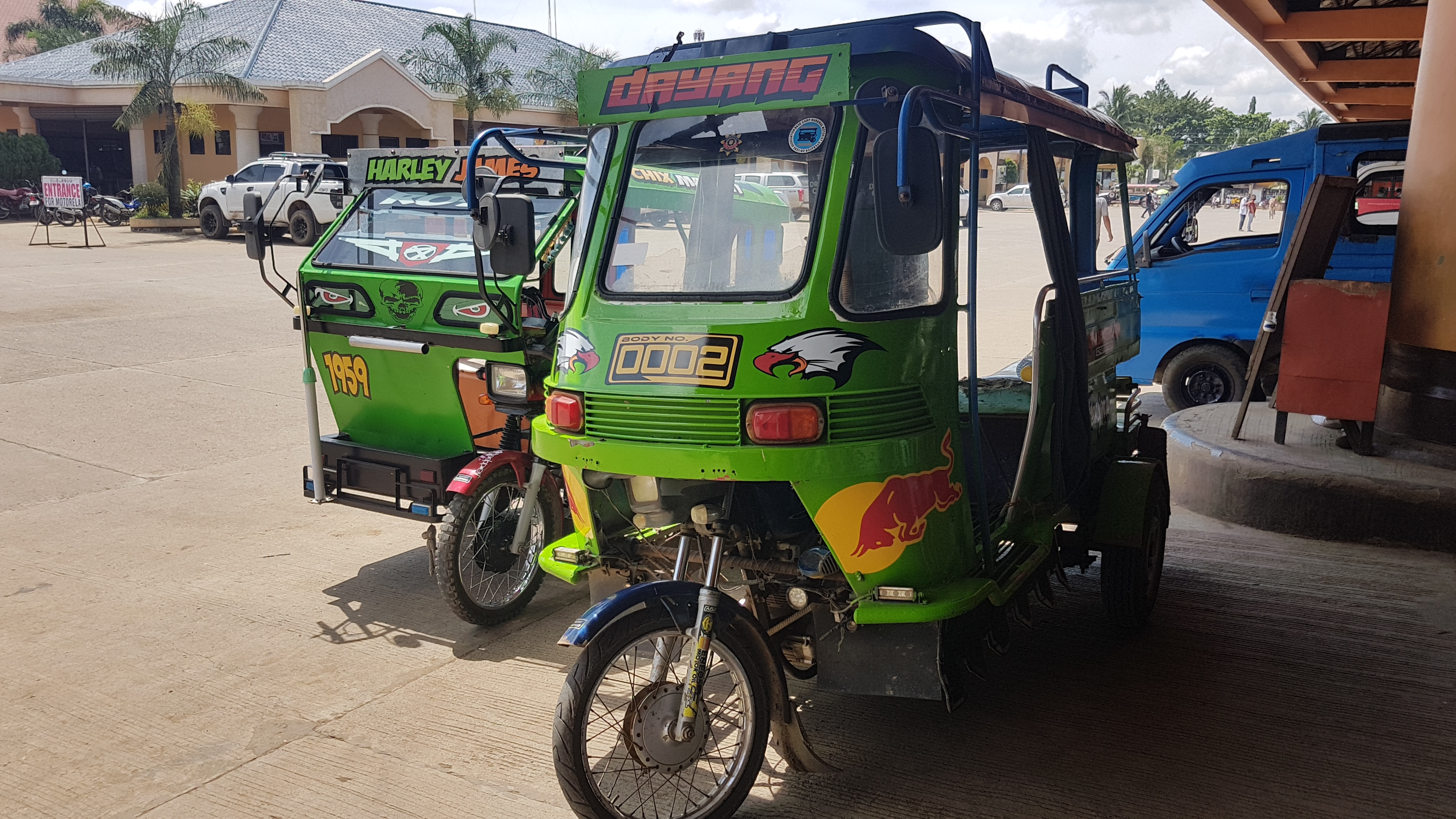
A motorela (right) and a tricycle (left). Note the motorela's centered cab, the sideways passenger seating, and the four wheels.

The motorela, locally nicknamed as "the mini jeepney", is a variant of a motorized tricycle predominantly used in Northern Mindanao, particularly in Cagayan de Oro and Bukidnon province. It is a motorcycle with an enclosed cabin rigidly attached, and has four wheels – the two wheels of a motorcycle, and an additional wheel on each side. It has the capacity to carry more passengers than the traditional tricycle. The motorela was invented by Rafael D. Floirendo, a mechanic from Cagayan de Oro, in 1964. The name "motorela" originates from a portmanteau of "motorized" and "carretela".

== Cargo tricycles ==
A variant of the tricycle used for carrying cargo is called garong or kolong kolong (also spelled kulong kulong, lit. "cage-like") in Tagalog. It is composed of a motorcycle attached to a sidecar made from welded metal pipes, bars, and/or sheet metal. The sidecar has a flat bed and usually has no seats or roofing. They are used widely, especially in public markets, to carry small-scale cargo like fish, vegetables, water bottles, and even live animals.

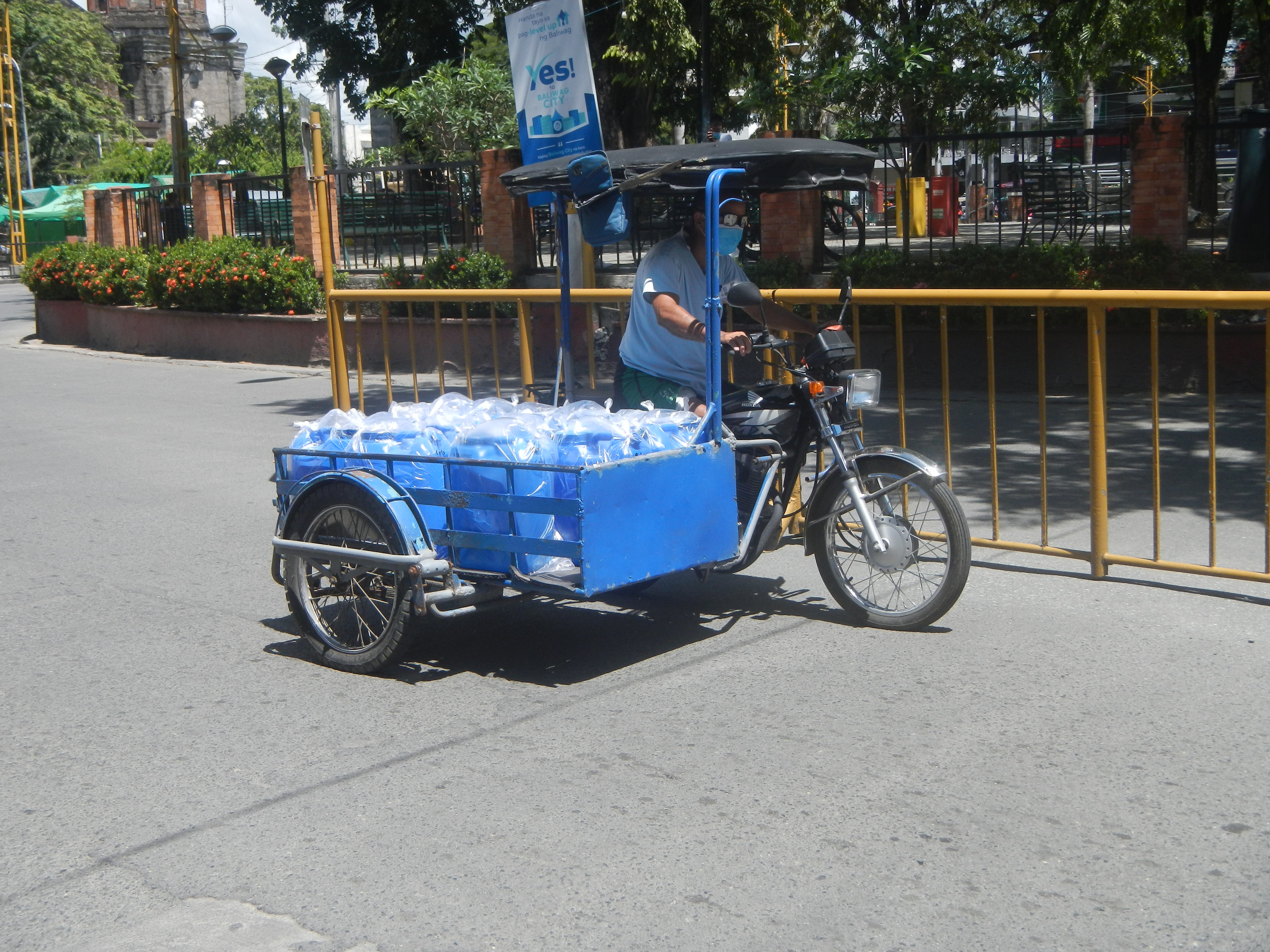
A typical garong delivering distilled water in Baliuag, Bulacan

== See also ==
- Auto rickshaw
- Jeepney
- Kalesa
- Tuktuk
