= Motorcar Museum of Japan =

Coordinates: 36.3343°N 136.4305°E

- 日本自動車博物館
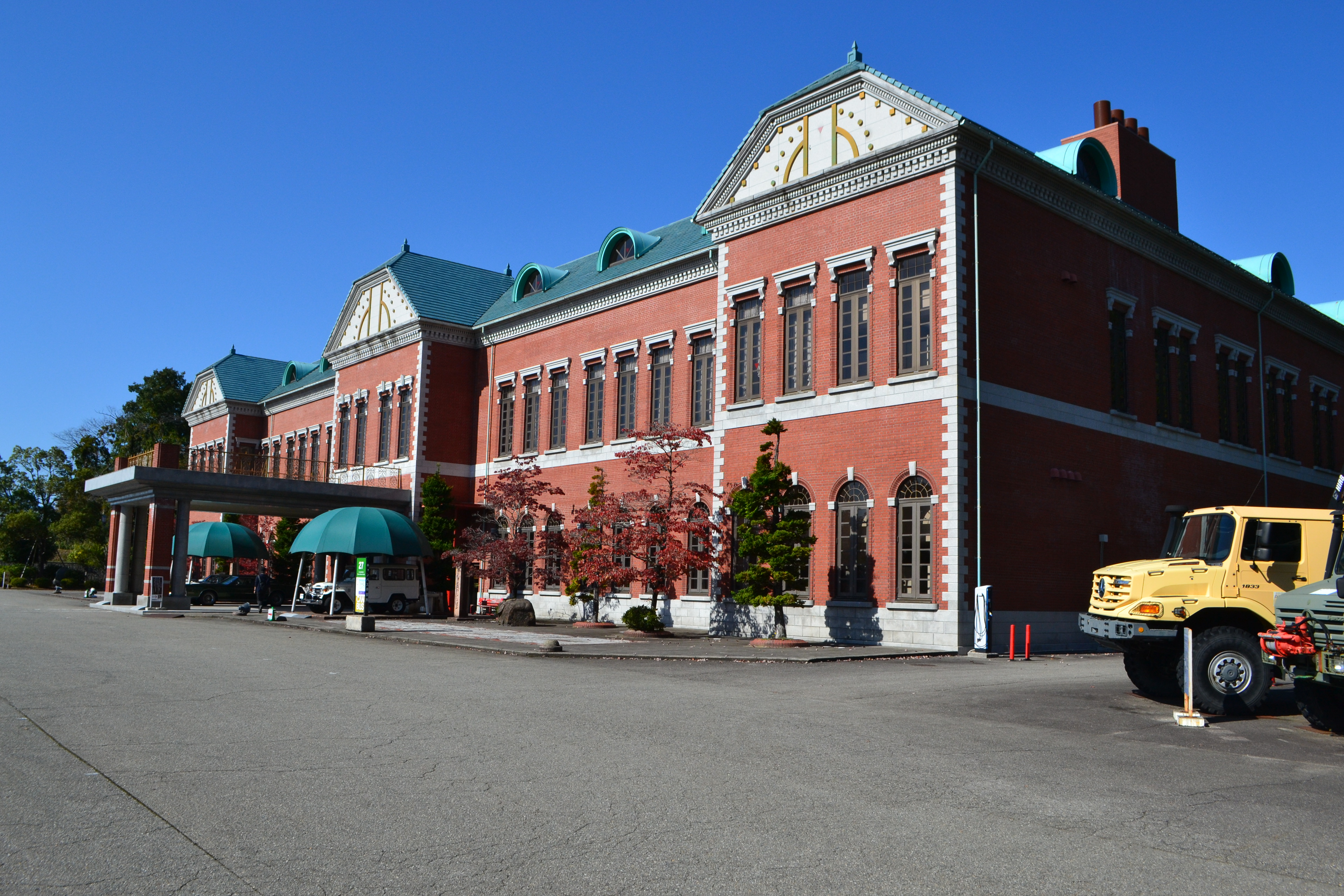
- Established: November 2, 1978
- Location: 40 Futatsunashimachi Ikkanyama, Komatsu, Ishikawa, Japan, 923-0345
- Type: Automobile museum
- Founder: Shozo Maeda
- Website: www.motorcar-museum.jp

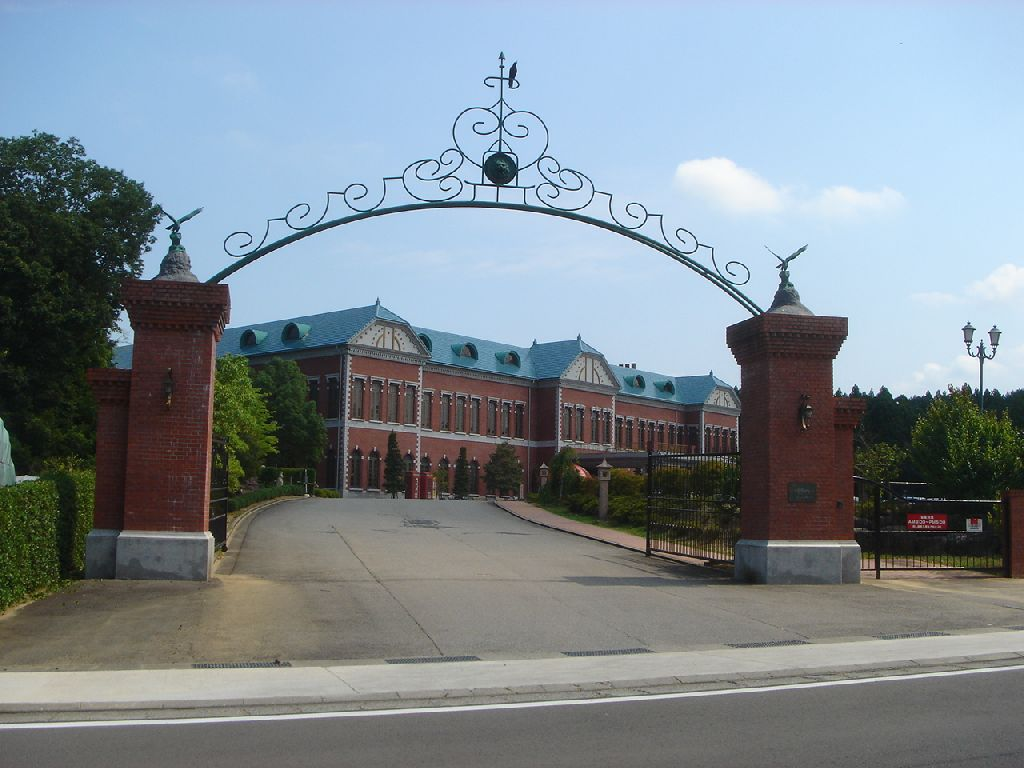
Main Gate

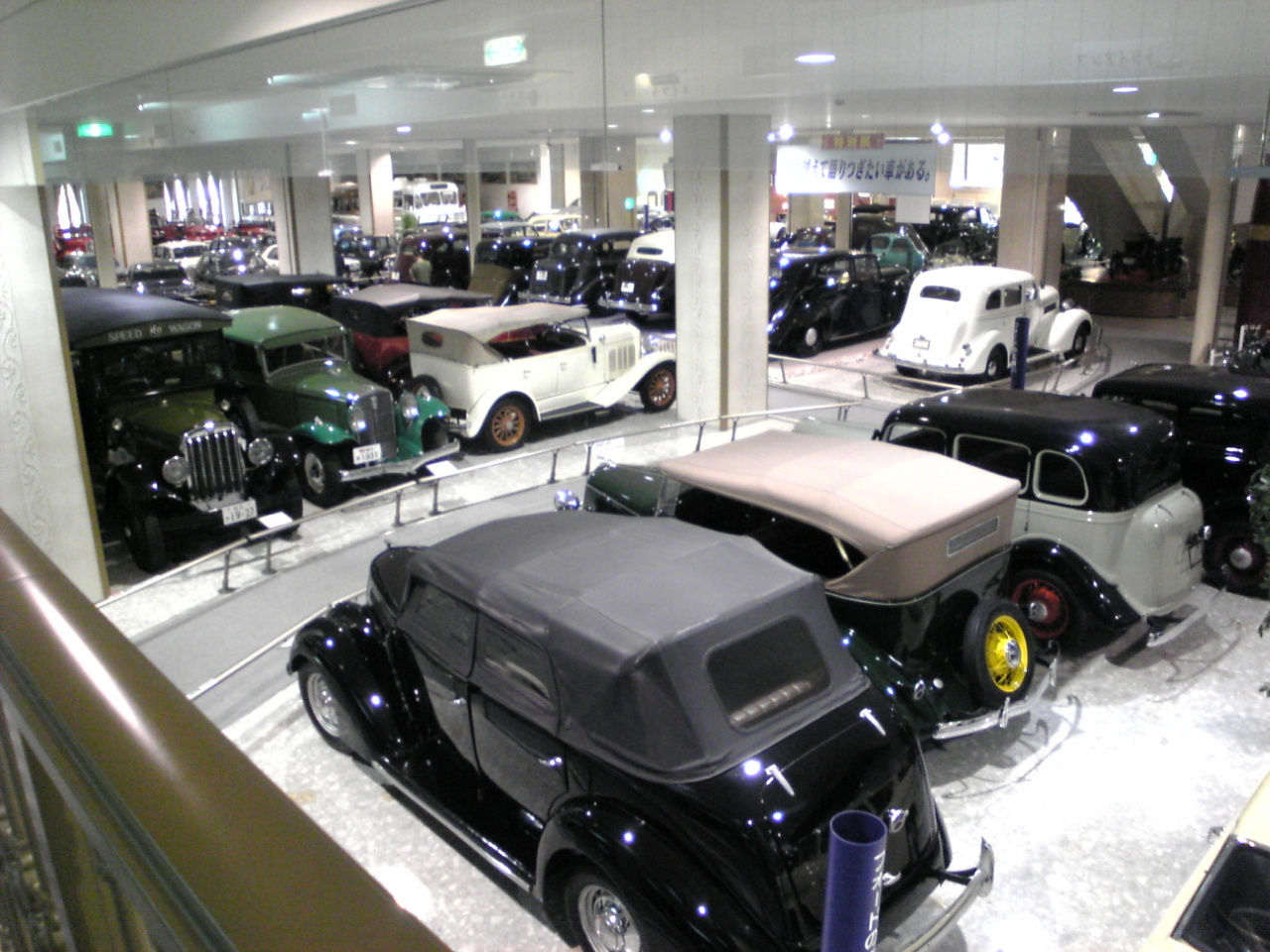
Inside

The Motorcar Museum of Japan（MMJ, Japanese: 日本自動車博物館 (Hiragana: にほんじどうしゃはくぶつかん)）is an automobile museum located in Futatsunashicho, Komatsu, Ishikawa.

== History ==
The museum was built on November 2, 1978, when Shozo Maeda (1930-2005), CEO of Ishikuro Sangyo, a cement sales business based in Oyabe, Toyama, opened a museum using the company's former headquarter to showcase his personal collection of automobiles. The museum relocated to its current location in Ishikawa Prefecture after the original building was demolished to make room for widening Route 8. This move was done to widen potential visitors to not just car enthusiasts, but also to tourists visiting the nearby onsen.

Maeda expanded his family business from a young age, and was a highly successful entrepreneur of the Hokuriku Region, with his businesses expanding to construction and sales of propane gas. At the same time, Maeda, a car enthusiast himself, thought poorly of the notion of work cars such as trucks being discarded quickly, leading to Maeda keeping a collection of these vehicles. Maeda spent the latter years of his life on opening the MMJ and expanding its collections, and as a result he was inducted in to the Japan Automotive Hall of Fame in 2004, alongside Shinroku Momose and Tatsuo Hasegawa.

The current main hall is three stories tall and made in brick, with the total floor area spanning 11,550m^{2}. The hall is divided by makes and types of the vehicles being displayed, and also has a museum restaurant and shop. There is also a section displaying toilets from across the world. This was added when the building was relocated in 1995, and it features usable toilets from a total of 15 countries from around the world on each floors, with the number of toilets totalling 56 as of 2018. These toilets have attracted the attention on social media, as they are posted on sites like Instagram alongside the 500 displayed vehicles.

== Collection ==
About 500 vehicles ranging from 1901 to the early Heisei-era are currently on display, as well as about 200 vehicles stored in the backyard. Most of these vehicles are in running condition.

Below are some of the displayed vehicles at the museum:

- Toyota 2000GT
- Rolls-Royce Silver Spur - Originally owned by the British Embassy and was used to chauffeur Princess Diana on her visit to Japan
- 1938 Toyota ABR Phaeton
- Type 94 Truck - Last surviving example; converted from a 6-wheel to a 4-wheel in the Post-War era
- Kurogane Type 95 - The first mass-produced Four-wheel drive vehicle in Japan.
- 1930 JAC New Era - The predecessor to the Kurogane three-wheeled trucks
- Austin A135 - The displayed specimen was the official car of the Korean Ambassador to Japan
- Jiotto Caspita
- Toyopet Super RHK
- Autech Zagato Stelvio - A custom made car designed by Zagato based on the Nissan Leopard. Displayed alongside the Zagato Gabia.
- Prince Skyline Sports
- Soraemon-go
- Mercedes-Benz 300 SL
- Flying Feather
- Fuji Cabin

The museum also hosts Maeda's former private cars such as the Rover P5 and the Renault Safrane, which became Maeda's last car.
