= Garong =

Garong can refer to:

- Garong, a type of cargo-carrying motorized tricycle in the Philippines
- Garong, a village in the Tibet Autonomous Region
