= Kurogane Baby =

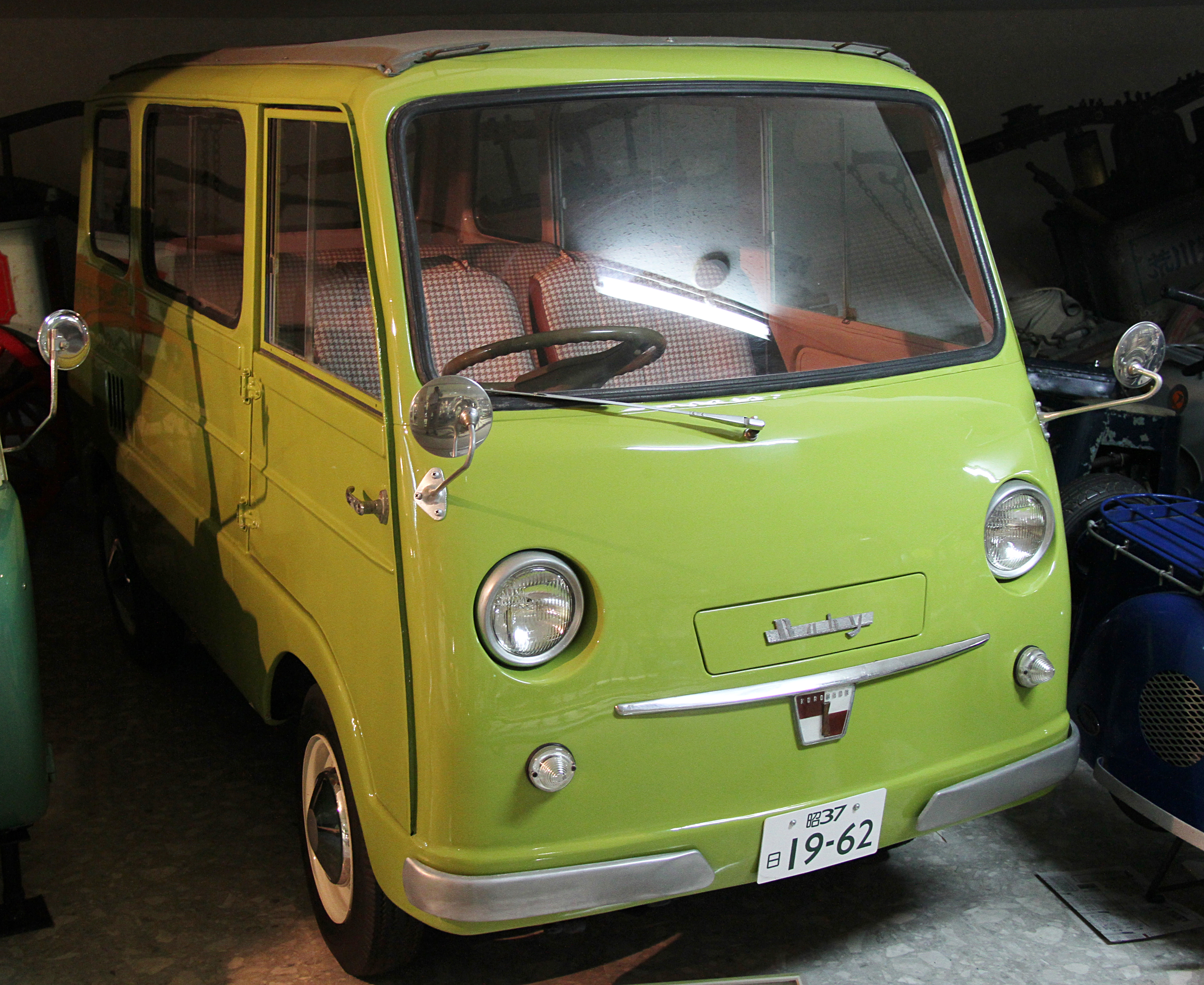
- A lime green Kurogane Baby microvan

Overview
- Manufacturer: Kurogane
- Production: 1959-1961
- Designer: Kazuo Ihara

Body and chassis
- Class: Kei truck Microvan
- Body style: Van; Pickup truck
- Layout: RR layout

Powertrain
- Engine: 356cc straight-2 OHV water-cooled 18 PS (13.2 kW; 17.8 bhp)
- Transmission: 3-speed Manual transmission

Dimensions
- Wheelbase: 1,750 mm (68.9 in)
- Length: 2,990 mm (117.7 in)
- Width: 1,280 mm (50.4 in)
- Height: 1,665 mm (65.6 in)
- Curb weight: 540 kg (1,190 lb) (Van)

The Kurogane Baby was a keitora and microvan built by the Japanese Kurogane company from April 1959 until January 1961, sold only in Japan. It was developed by a company of which Kurogane had assumed operations, called Ohta Jidosha, but was introduced under the Kurogane brand and was only available until 1962. It had a 356-cc, water-cooled, overhead-valve, two-cylinder engine installed in the back of the vehicle, with rear-wheel drive. The more competitively priced Subaru Sambar and the Suzuki Carry proved to be more popular and the Baby was discontinued after less than two years. It was available in two bodystyles, a van and a pickup.
