= Mitsubishi PX33 =

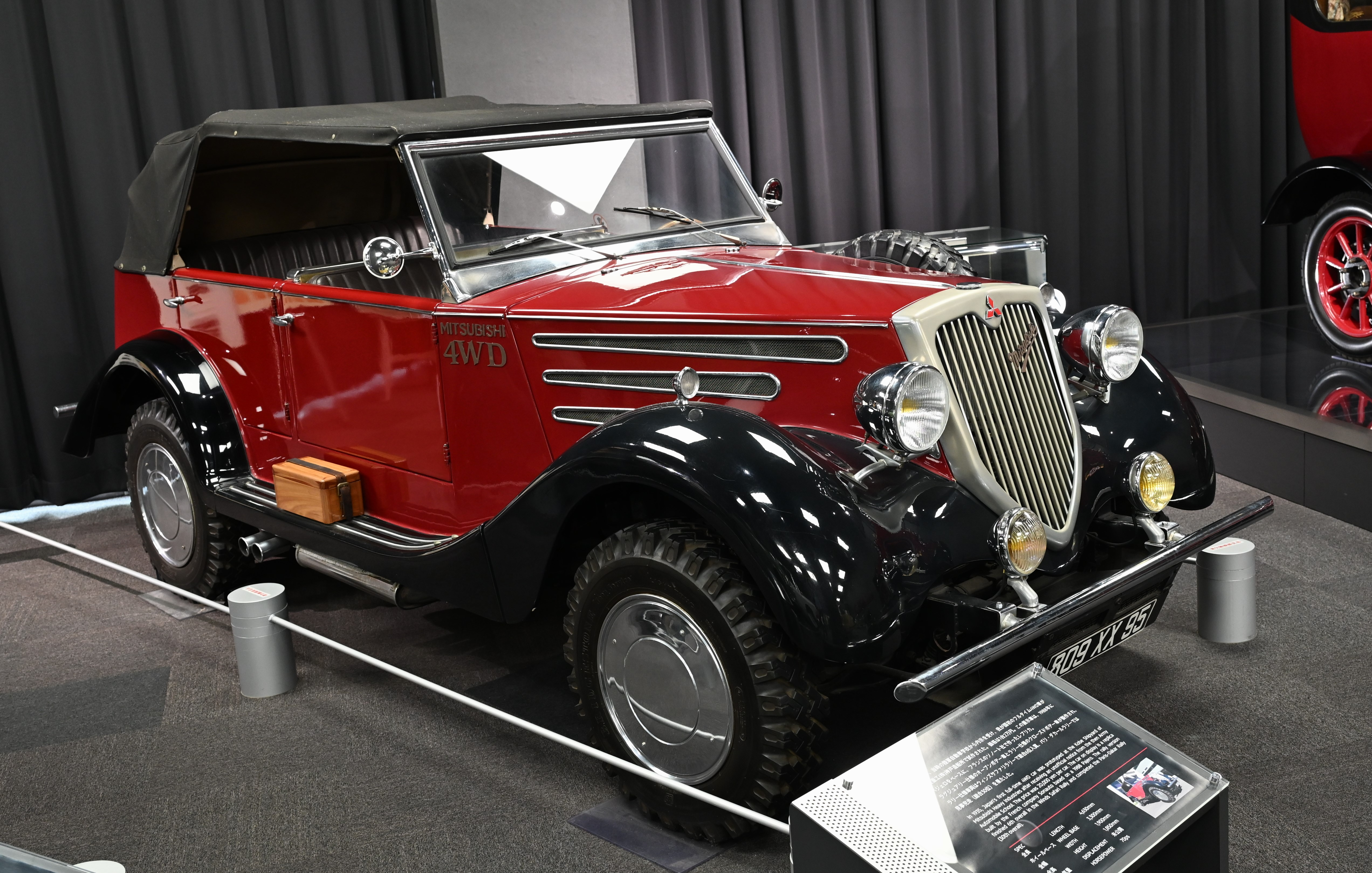

Overview
- Manufacturer: Mitsubishi Heavy Industries
- Production: 1934–1937

Body and chassis
- Class: Prototype
- Body style: 4-door convertible
- Layout: Front-engine, four-wheel drive

Powertrain
- Engine: 6.7 L 445AD I6

The Mitsubishi PX33 is a prototype passenger car built by Mitsubishi Heavy Industries, the company which would eventually sire Mitsubishi Motors. Commissioned for military use by the Japanese government in 1934, it was the first Japanese-built sedan to have full-time four-wheel drive, a technology the company would return to fifty years later in pursuit of motorsport success. Four working prototypes were built, and a version was in development using Mitsubishi's 6.7 litre, 70 PS (51 kW; 69 hp) 445AD powerplant, Japan's first direct injection diesel engine. However, the entire PX33 project was cancelled in 1937 after the government decided to prioritize Mitsubishi's manufacturing capabilities on commercial development of trucks and buses. In 1937, another Japanese company Tokyu Kurogane Kogyo began production of a smaller four-wheel drive car called the Kurogane Type 95.

The PX33 received renewed attention as a marketing tool for Mitsubishi during the release of the fourth generation Mitsubishi Pajero. The PX33's historical and technological link to the company's newest sport utility vehicle saw both cars displayed in parallel at the Paris Motor Show in September 2006.

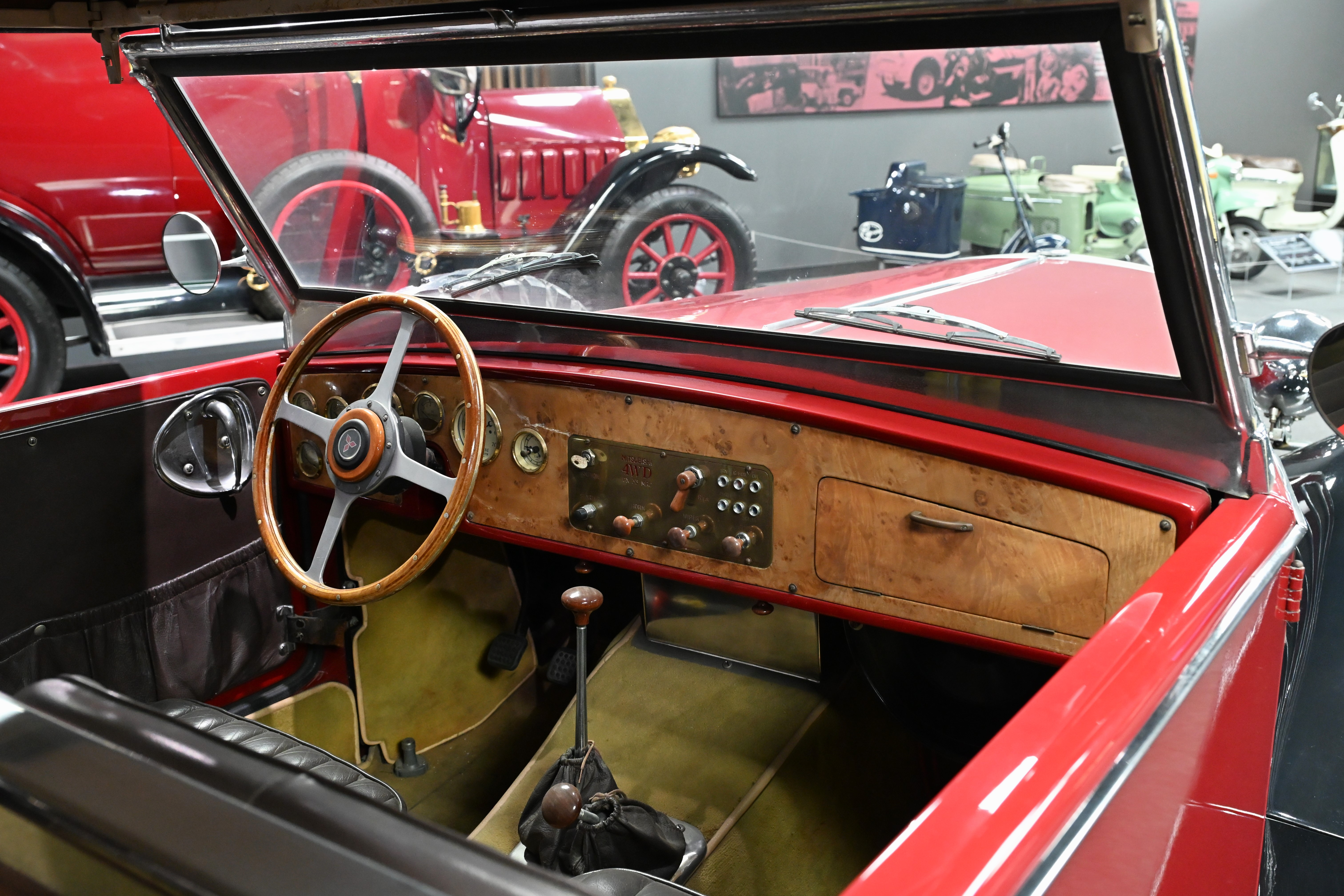
Interior

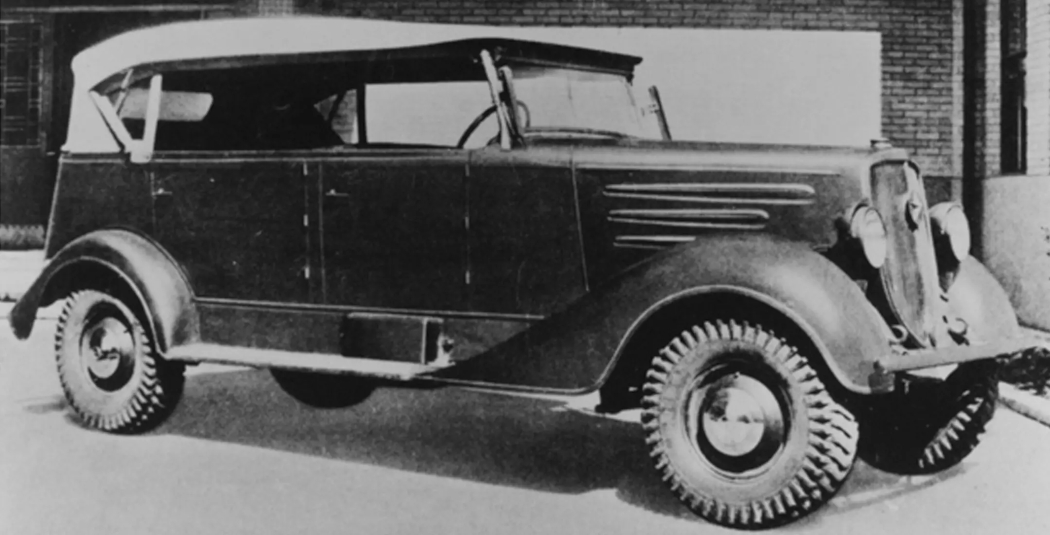
Original Mitsubishi PX33
