= Tokyu Kogyo Kurogane =

Japanese automaker

Coordinates: 35.375999°N 139.39009°E

Tokyu Kurogane Industries
- Industry: Automotive
- Founded: 1926
- Founder: Tetsuji Makita
- Defunct: 1962
- Fate: Operations assumed by Nissan Machinery in 1962
- Headquarters: Tokyo, Japan
- Products: Automobiles, Commercial vehicles, Military vehicles

Tokyu Kurogane Industries (東急くろがね工業, Tōkyū Kurogane Kōgyō), or Kurogane, was one of the first Japanese automakers. It built vehicles from about 1926 until 1962 when a subsidiary of Nissan, called Nissan Machinery (Nissan Koki Co., Ltd. 日産工機), assumed operations as the company had become a member of the Nissan Group keiretsu. The word kurogane (くろがね or 鉄) is an old term for iron, and one of the kanji used in Mr. Makita's first name. Remnants of the company were called Nissan Machinery (Nissan Koki) until 1985, and operated as a separate entity within Nissan Techno (日産テクノ) until 2006, building and developing all of Nissan's current engines.

== History ==
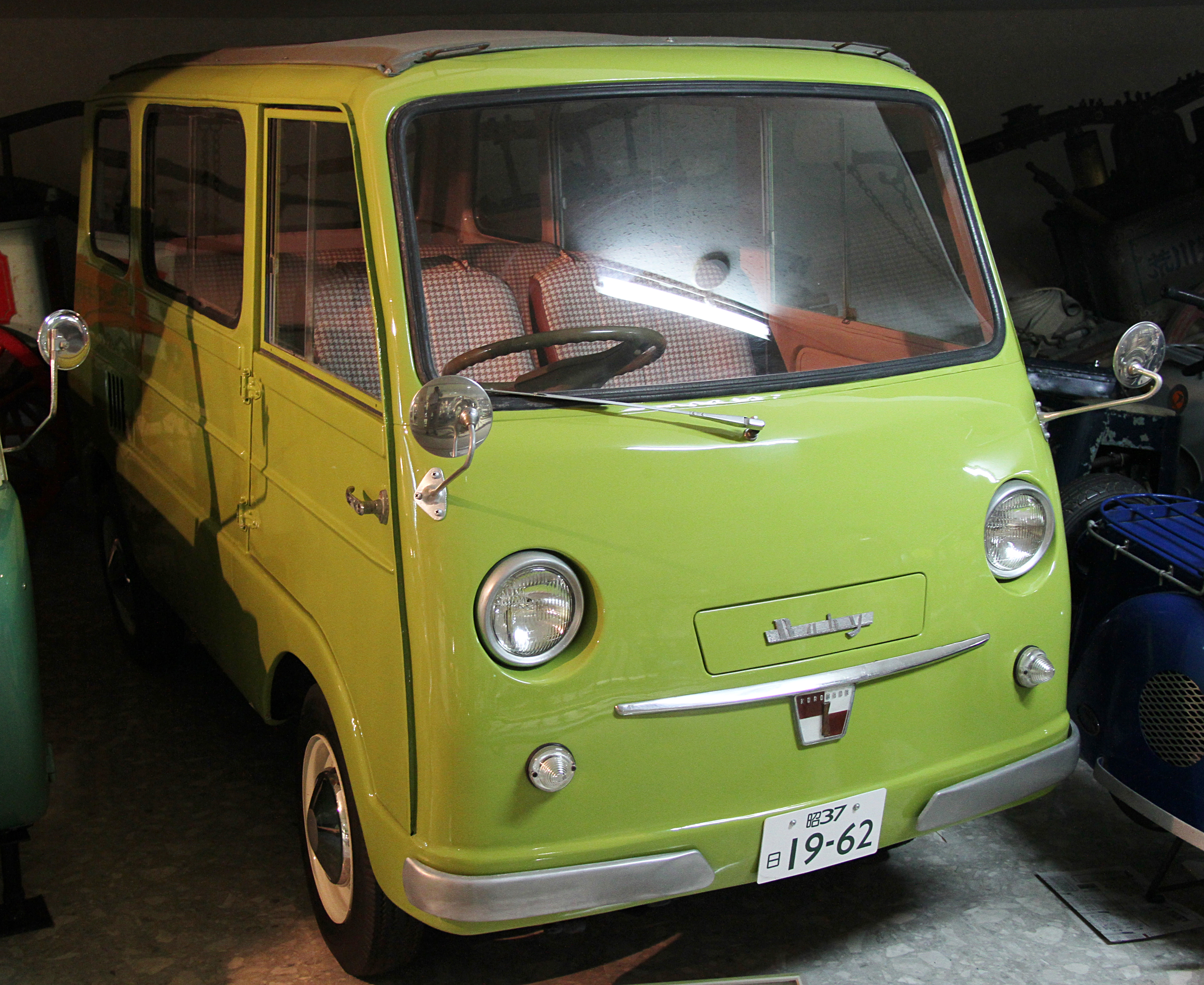
1962 Kurogane Baby microvan

The company can be traced back to the small company Shūkōsha (秀工舎) founded by Tetsuji Makita (蒔田鉄司) in 1917, which was a parts supplier for bicycles and motorcycles. Mr. Makita left the company in 1918 to work for Toyogawa Hayataya (豊川順彌) and the Hakuyosha Ironworks Company (白楊社), manufacturer of the Otomo car, having manufactured 300 by 1927. The company actively entered in the automobile market in the 1920s when Mr. Makita returned in 1926, and then merged with the Japan Automobile (Nihon Jidōsha), a subsidiary of the Okura (大倉財閥) zaibatsu, which changed its name to Japan Internal Combustion Engine Company Ltd. (日本内燃機株式会社) in 1932. It then manufactured cars, motorcycles and three-wheeled trucks, or sanrin (三輪) under the Kurogane brand for the Imperial Japanese Army in Ōmori, Ōta, Tokyo. When the zaibatsu were dismantled after the war, Kurogane was realigned from remnants of the Nissan Group zaibatsu. Kurogane, like many other Japanese manufacturers prospered as a supplier for the United States Army during the Korean War, but when the conflict ended in 1953, Japan entered into a recession and smaller companies suffered as a result. It assumed operations of another company called Ohta Automobiles in 1957. In 1959, it became part of the Tokyu Corporation as a manufacturer of cars, trucks and farm equipment until Nissan assumed operations.

Former names and merged smaller companies include Japan Internal Combustion Engine Co., Ltd., Japan Internal Combustion Engine Manufacturing Co., Ltd., Japan Automobile Industry Co., Ltd. (日本自動車), Japan Minicar Co., Ltd. (日本軽自動車) and Tokyu Kurogane Industrial Co., Ltd.

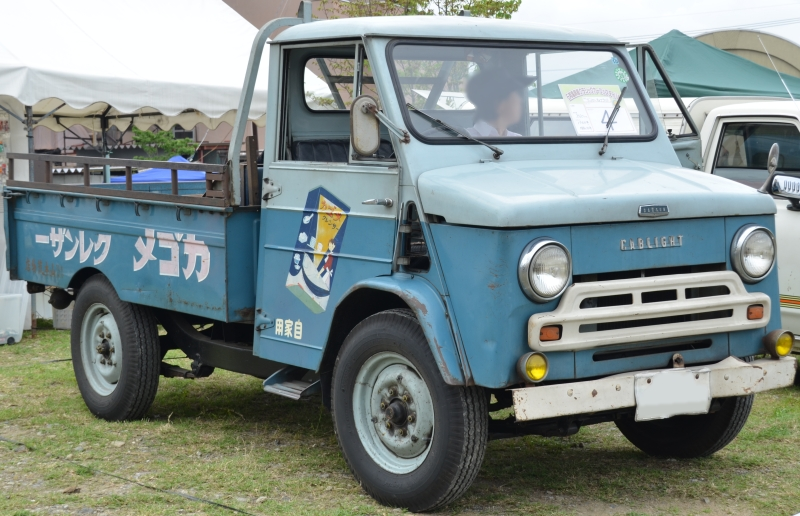
1962 Datsun Cablight (Kurogane Mighty)

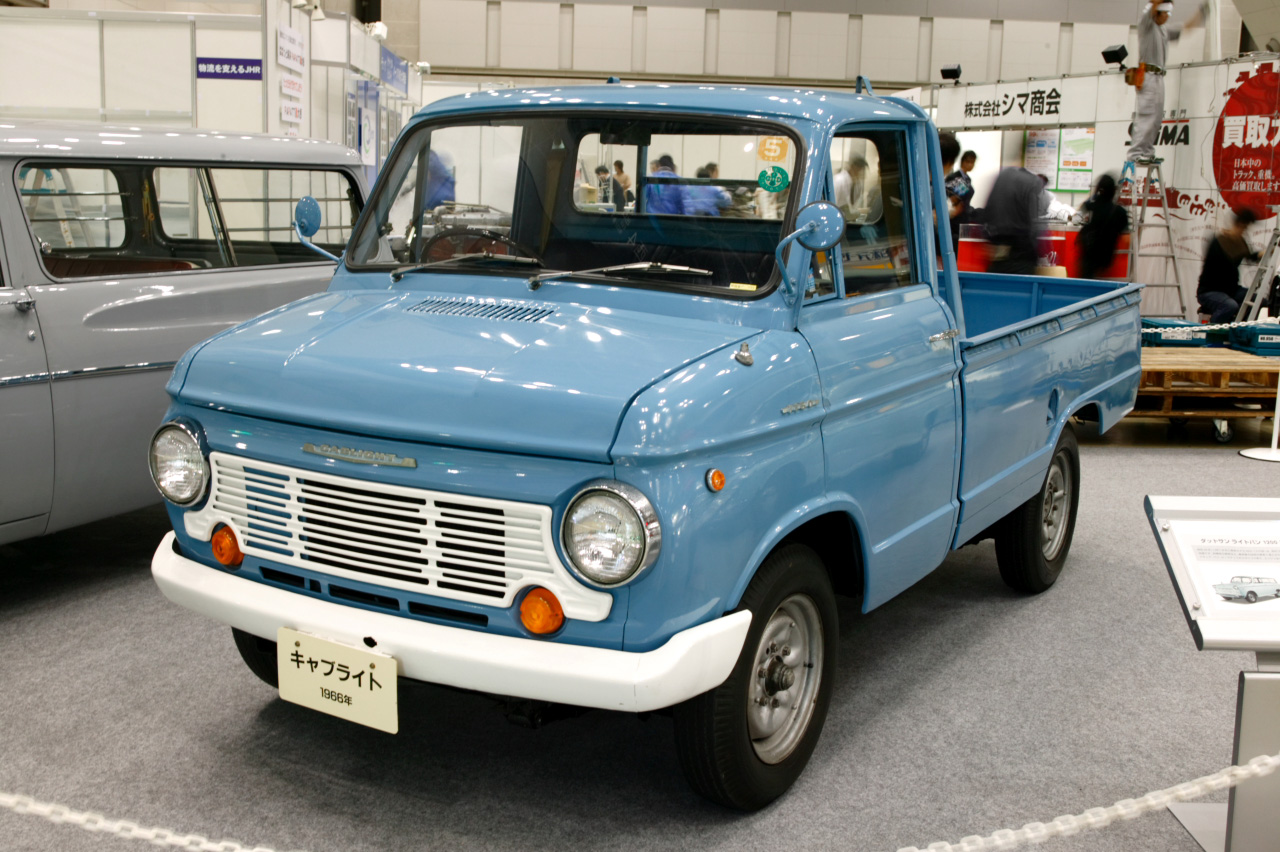
1966 Datsun Cablight

When Kurogane began manufacturing vehicles, they were considered in Japan one of the surviving four original manufacturers, the other three being Datsun, Isuzu, and Mazda. For the brief time Kurogane produced vehicles, their market focus was on commercial vehicles for logistics and small business manufacturing transport. Kurogane found the commercial market crowded, competing with the Prince Homer, Nissan Diesel, Isuzu Elf, Mitsubishi Fuso Canter, Toyota Dyna and the Hino TH-series. In 1963 when Nissan assumed operations, the Kurogane Mighty was re-branded with minor body changes as the Datsun Cablight (Japanese article). Kurogane management structure and assets were now under Nissan corporate structure, much the same as the arrangement when Nissan merged with Prince Motor Company, while the Kurogane name was not used. In 1964, Kurogane was no longer considered part of the Tokyu Corporation. The company became known as Nissan Machinery in 1970, with their efforts used for engine development.

== Vehicles manufactured ==
- Kurogane Type 95, the world's first four-wheel drive vehicle to be placed into mass production in 1936
- Kurogane Sanrin, three-wheeler truck based on the Harley-Davidson Servi-Car developed by the Rikuo Motorcycle brandname
- Kurogane Mighty, (type NA/NB/NC 1957–1962) a four-wheel, mid-sized, cabover truck/cargo van, it was taken over by Nissan and sold as the "Cablight".
- Kurogane Baby, (April 1959 - January 1961) a keitora (軽トラ) / microvan cabover vehicle in cargo van and pickup truck bodystyles
- Ohta KE/VM, a legacy product taken over from Ohta and sold under that name from 1957 until 1959 with the 48-PS E13 engine.
- Kurogane Nova 1500 (KN), a rebranded Ohta series KE truck and VM series delivery van (1959–1962): The 1,770 kg (3,900 lb) Nova received a 1.5-L (1488-cc "E15") engine with 62 PS (46 kW) and managed a 2 metric tons (4,400 lb) payload.

== Three-wheeled trucks ==
Kurogane began building three-wheeled trucks in 1936. Based on the Harley-Davidson Servi-Car, they also used V-twin engines of various displacements to suit the weight categories. The biggest V-twin built by Kurogane was the 1360-cc VYA engine from the mid-1950s. In 1958, a water-cooled, four-cylinder engine was introduced for the 1.5 t (3,300 lb) KS truck; this was the 1.3-L E-13 engine. As Mazda switched to water-cooled, inline-fours for their entire three-wheeled truck lineup, Kurogane soon followed suit and added the 1046-cc E-10 in 1959 and then the 1.5-L E-15 engine, which was also used in their four-wheeled vehicles. Kurogane's heaviest three-wheelers were 2-tonne (4,400 lb) models like the KF and the later KY.

== Engines developed as Nissan Machinery ==
- Nissan RB engine inline 6
- Nissan TB engine inline 6
- Nissan VG engine V6 replaced by Nissan VQ engine V6
  - Nissan VR engine
- Nissan Z engine inline 4 replaced by Nissan NA engine inline 4
  - Nissan CA engine inline 4 replaced Nissan Z engine, was replaced by Nissan SR engine inline 4
  - Nissan KA engine inline 4 replaced Nissan Z engine, was replaced by Nissan QR engine inline 4
- Nissan engines (Japanese)

== See also ==
- Autech
- Nismo
