= Kei truck =

Japanese vehicle class

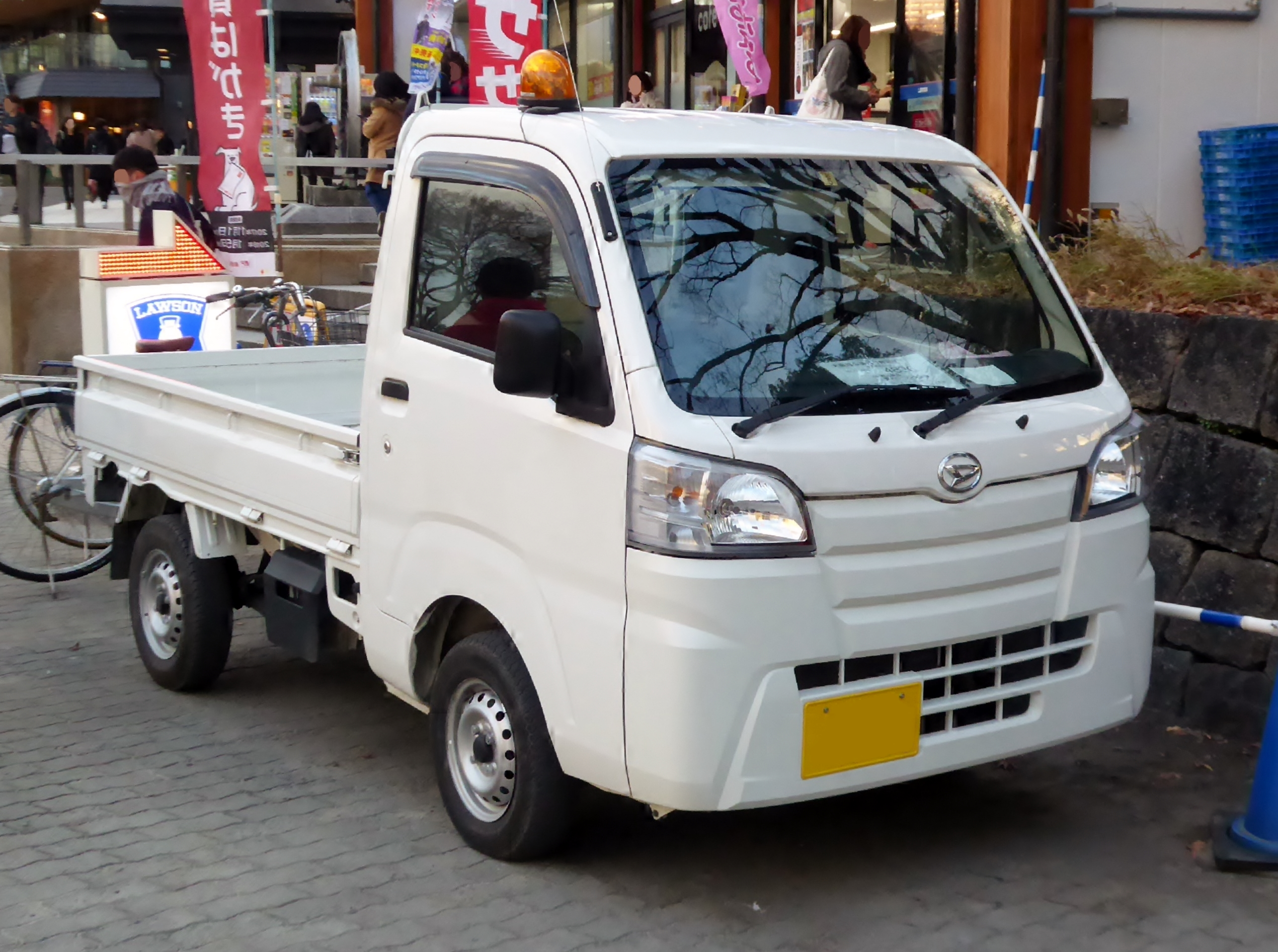
Daihatsu Hijet

A kei truck, kei-class truck, or Japanese mini truck, known in Japan as a keitora (軽トラ 'light truck'), is a style of pickup truck built to satisfy the Japanese keijidōsha (軽自動車 'light vehicle') statutory class of light vehicles. Limited to certain size restrictions—currently no more than 3.4 m (11.2 ft) long and 1.48 m (4.9 ft) wide—they are produced by a wide range of Japanese automakers and are available in rear-wheel or four-wheel drive.

Kei trucks were first introduced in Japan in 1959 and have since been widely used throughout Asia. Since at least the 2020s, they have become increasingly popular in North America, earning a cult following for the affordability and reliability.

== Design ==
The kei truck class specifies a maximum size and displacement, which has steadily increased since legislation first enabled the type in 1949. They evolved from earlier three-wheeled trucks based on motorcycles with a small load-carrying area, called san-rin (三輪), which were popular in Japan before World War II. Since 1998, the law admits a maximum length of 3.4 m (134 in), a maximum width of 1.48 m (58 in) and a maximum height of 2.0 m (79 in) with a maximum displacement of 660 cc. They weigh about 700 kg (1,500 lb), and when ungoverned, can reach up to 120 km/h (75 mph).

Due to the limits established with regard to vehicle length, most, if not all, current trucks in this classification are built with the "cab over" approach to maximize load-carrying abilities; the Suzuki Mighty Boy is one of the rare historical exceptions. Despite the size and engine displacement, most kei trucks have a bed load capacity of 350 kg (770 lb), and the bed dimensions are comparable to crew cab versions of far larger vehicles such as the Ford F-150. Kei pickups generally have 1.8 m (6 ft) pickup beds with fold-down sides; dump and scissor-lift beds are also available, as are van bodies. For export markets, kei trucks are usually fitted with bigger engines to allow them even more carrying capabilities. An Indonesian version of the originally 543-cc Suzuki Carry was built with a 1.6-litre unit – nearly three times larger.

They are built with a strong, full, box-frame design with fully enclosed cabs, seat belts, windshield wipers, AM radios, heaters, lights and signals, and catalytic converters, and are claimed to have a fuel efficiency of 40 mpg_{‑US} (17 km/L; 5.9 L/100 km; 48 mpg_{‑imp}).

Typical manufacturers and model names include: Daihatsu Hijet, Subaru Sambar, Suzuki Carry, Mazda / Autozam Scrum, Mitsubishi Minicab. Honda has ended production and sales of kei trucks with the end of production of Honda Acty in 2021. The first kei truck to go on sale was the Kurogane Baby, manufactured from 1959 until 1962.

Many of these have been produced under license abroad, such as the Piaggio Porter. In South Korea, Daewoo and Asia (Kia) produced rebadged Suzuki Carry/Every, and Daihatsu Hijet vans as Daewoo Labo/Damas, and the Asia/Kia Towner.

== Uses ==
Kei trucks are widely employed throughout Asia in agriculture, fisheries, construction, and even for firefighting.

Japanese progressive tax laws encourage declaring vehicles surplus after a relatively short life; consequently, used kei trucks are often exported in excellent condition with very low mileage.

In the Philippines, many kei trucks and vans have found a second life as a form of public transportation called "multicabs". These are used Japanese-market kei vehicles, refurbished to meet local requirements by various companies such as Norkis Motors.

Used models originally appeared in the US for off-road use, often by farmers and hunters. Since 2010, many common uses in the US include campus maintenance vehicles, landscape and property maintenance, delivery vehicles, agricultural uses, golf courses, construction sites, small-business transportation and advertisement, and private recreational and homeowner use. The Kei truck became increasingly attractive to Americans as a reaction to US auto corporations' fixation on the manufacture of large and heavy trucks, which offered these corporations a wider profit margin. Similarly, a demand exists in Australia as a reaction to oversized US-influenced vehicles.

== Legal status in United States ==
As they are street-legal in their home market and most of the world, kei trucks do generally have the standard equipment required for United States roadways, such as seat belts, approved lighting (headlamps, taillights, reverse and brake lights, turn signals), horn and U.S.-standard "AS1/AS2" safety glass; they must pass state safety inspections where required. They are approved for use on local roads in several states, while other states have special legislation regarding them. Some controversy has arisen regarding their use on United States roadways, largely caused by a since-deleted report by the nonlegislative American Association of Motor Vehicle Administrators. The report, issued in 2011, raised concerns about the safety and emissions compliance of kei trucks. At the time of the report, information regarding off-road only, low-speed mini trucks of Chinese origins were often conflated with kei trucks. State legislation passed during 2008 in Oklahoma and Louisiana is the most liberal, prohibiting their use only on interstate highways. As of October 2024, kei trucks are illegal for all road usage in several states with Maine being the most prohibitive.

Kei vehicles older than 25 years may be imported into the United States with very few restrictions. As of January 2026, more than 30,000 Kei trucks have been imported into the United States since 2020.

In December 2025, US president Donald Trump suggested bringing Japanese-style kei cars and trucks to the United States to address rising vehicle prices and auto affordability, provided they are built in North America rather than imported.

In November 2026, Toyota announced plans to introduce a rebadged Daihatsu Hijet into the North American market as the Scion KEI-01, with the truck manufactured in the United States and compliant with local regulations. However, they would only be sold to corporations as fleet vehicles, not to private individuals.

== Gallery ==
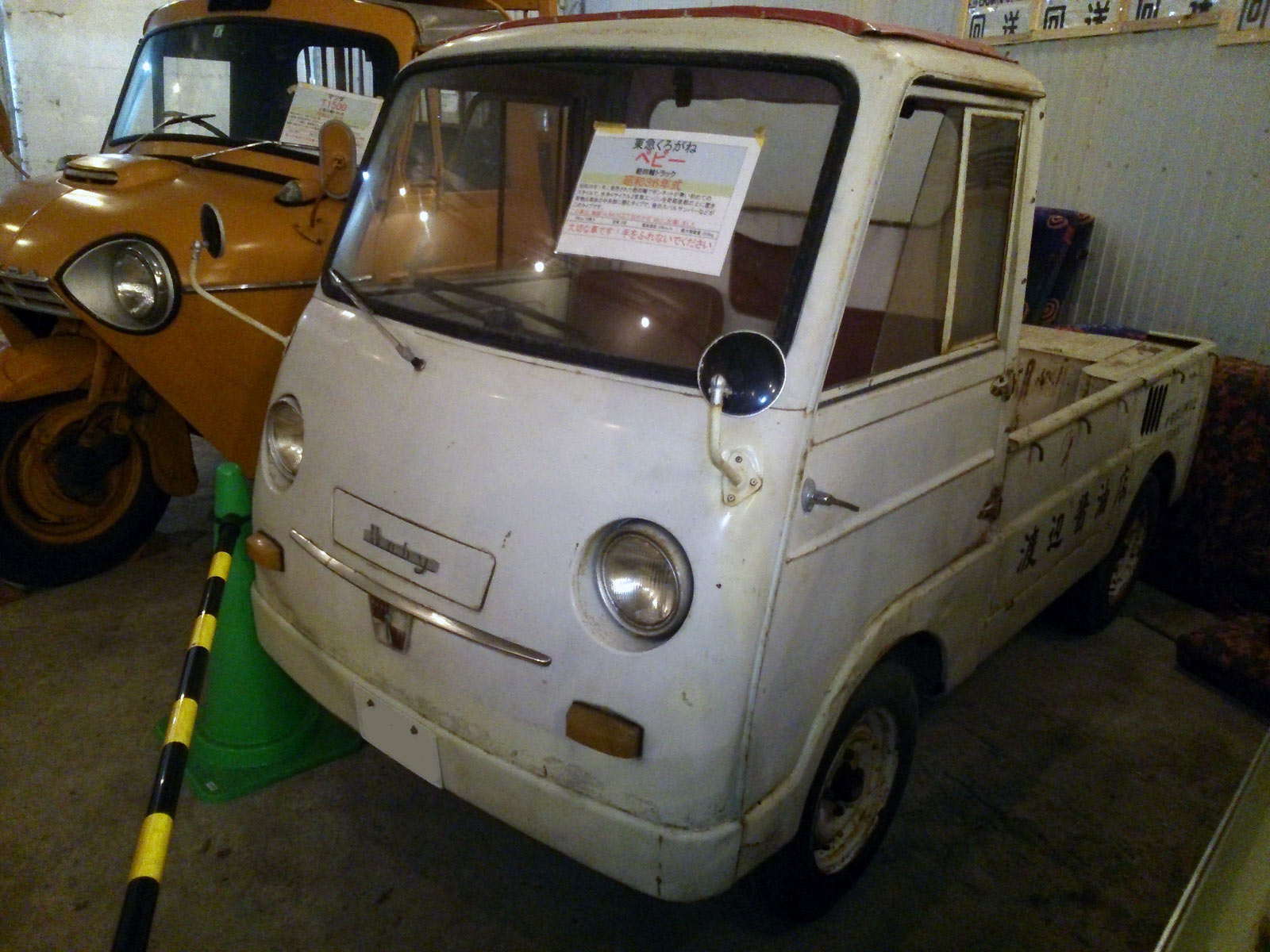
The Kurogane Baby was the first kei truck and an early adopter of the cab-over design

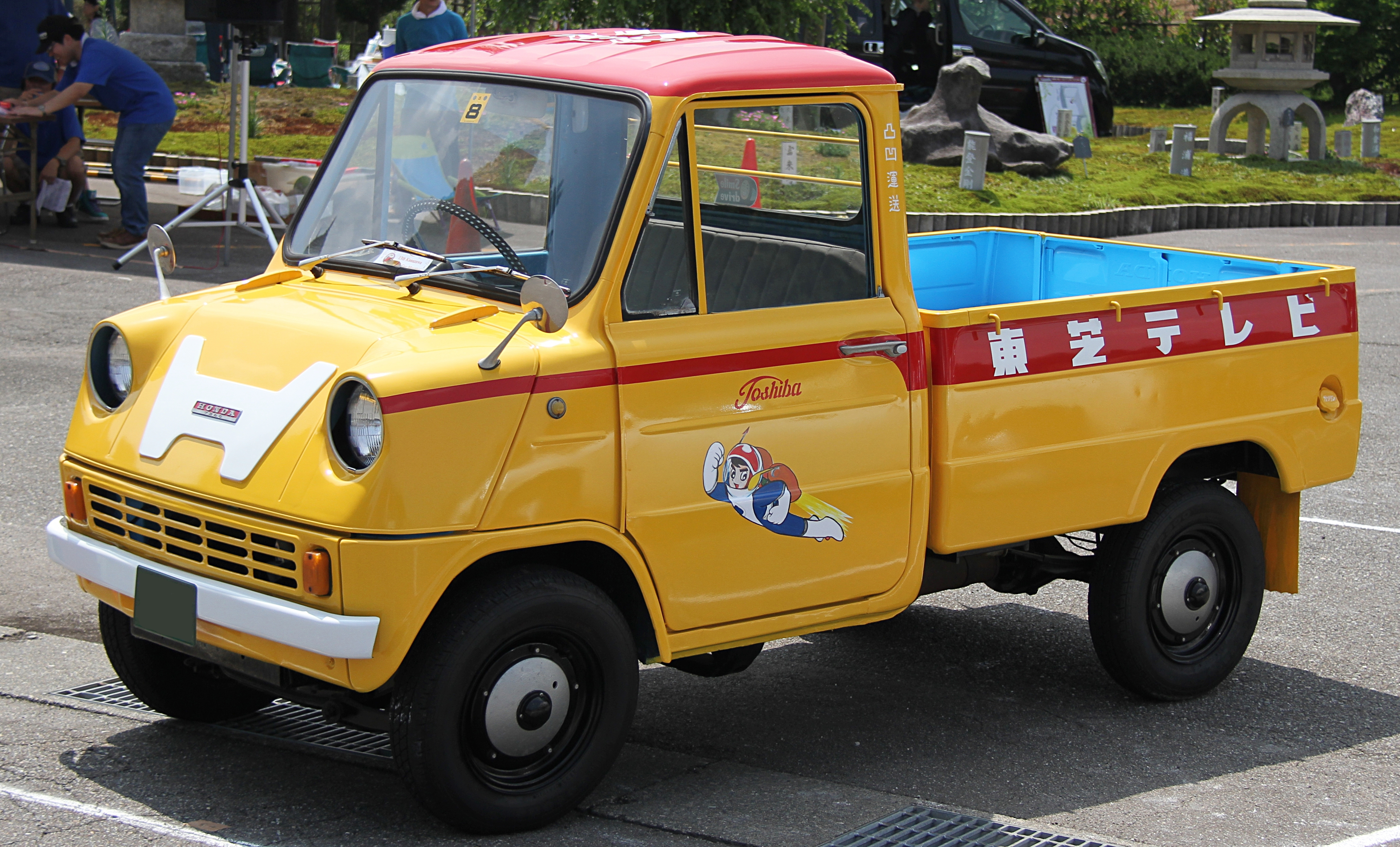
The bonneted Honda T360 was Honda's first automobile

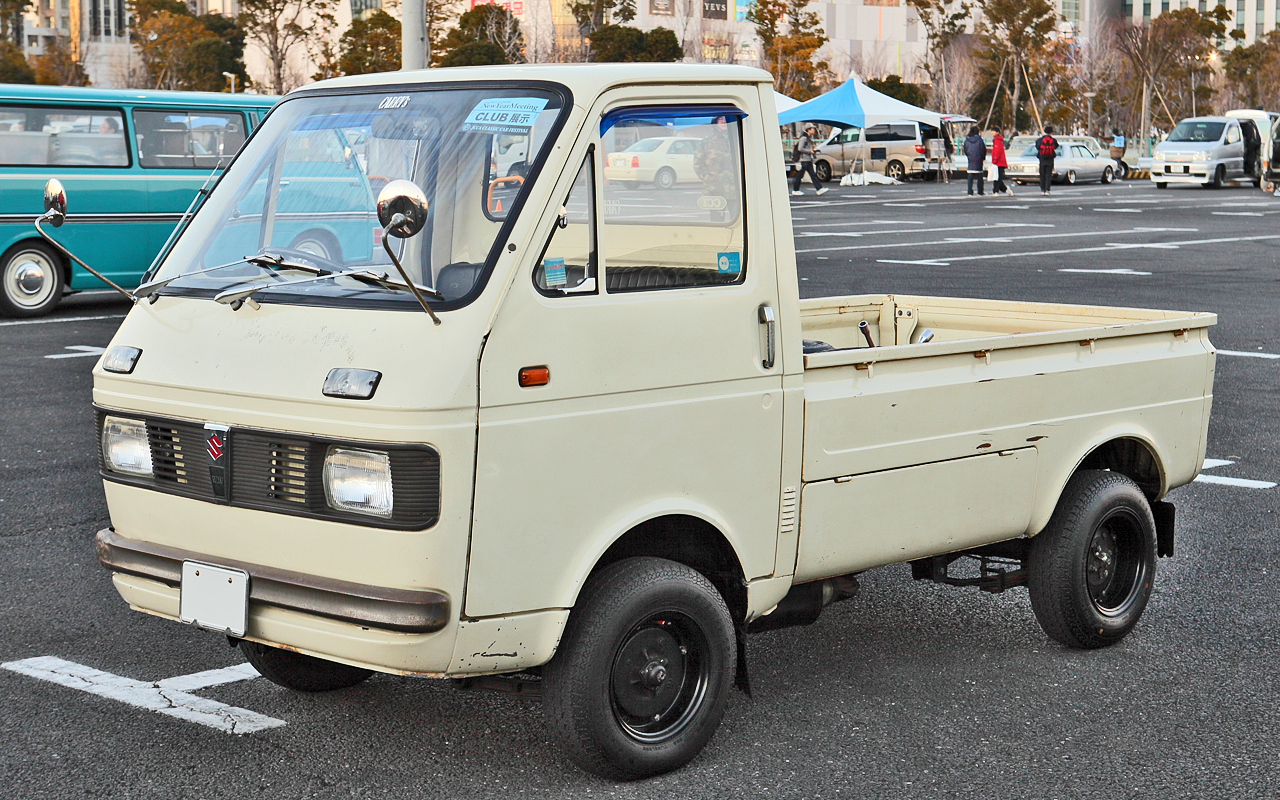
The Suzuki Carry L40 was designed by Giorgetto Giugiaro

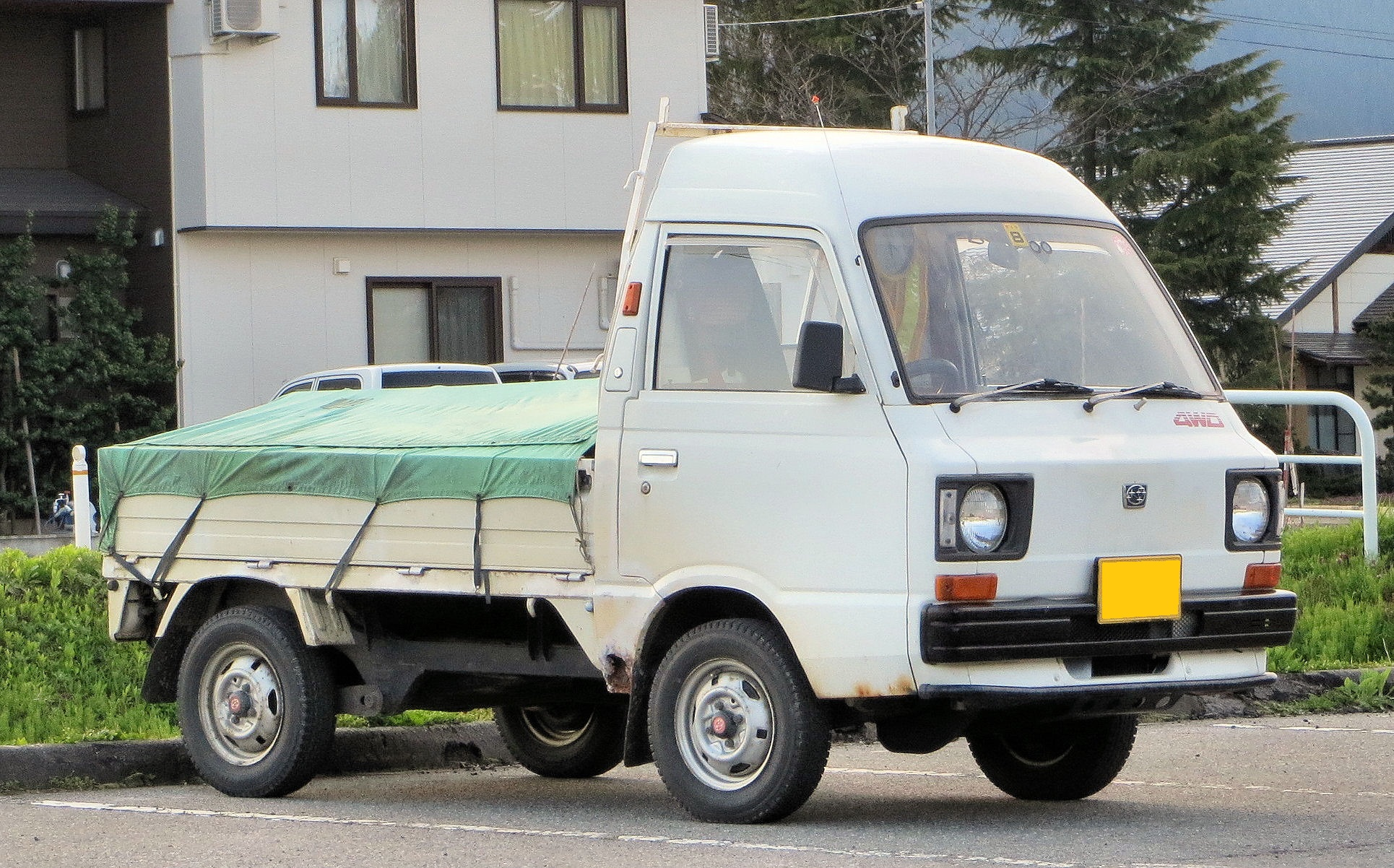
The Subaru Sambar was one of the first kei trucks, here is a 1980s model

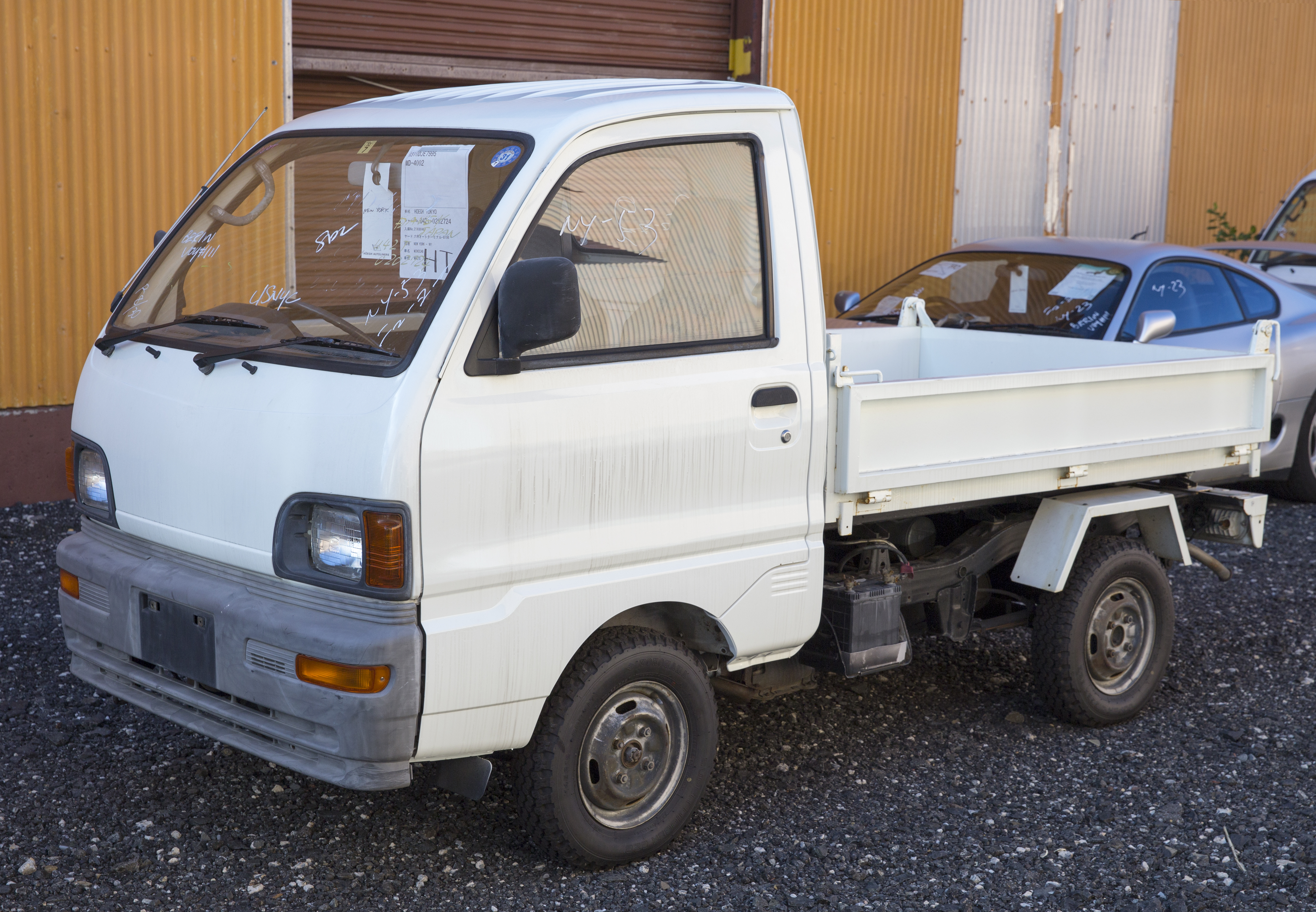
The Mitsubishi Minicab (1991–1999 model)

== See also ==
- Kei car - The class where kei trucks fall into, including non-trucks.
