= Type 97 motorcycle =

Copy of a Harley-Davidson with sidecar produced in Japan

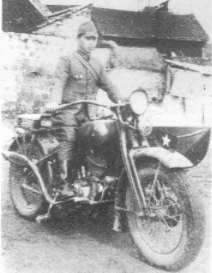
- A Japanese Soldier Resting on his Type 97 Motorcycle
- Manufacturer: Rikuo Nainen Company
- Production: 1935–1945
- Assembly: Japan
- Engine: 1,274 cc (77.7 cu in) Twin-cylinder, V-shape
- Power: 24 hp (18 kW) @ 4,000 rpm
- Transmission: 3 forward, 1 reverse
- Wheelbase: 1,600 mm (63 in)
- Dimensions: L: 2,591 mm (102.0 in); W: 1,820 mm (72 in); H: 1,168 mm (46.0 in)

The Type 97 motorcycle, or Rikuo, was a copy of a Harley-Davidson motorcycle produced with a sidecar from 1935 in Japan under license from Harley-Davidson by the Sankyo Company (later Rikuo Nainen Company). Some 18,000 of the machines were used by the Imperial Japanese forces during World War II. A variation was also manufactured without a side car, called the Type 93.

In the years after World War I, Harley-Davidson's US sales declined while dozens of US motorcycle brands went under, primarily as a result of the decline in the price of the Ford Model T car, triggering a national shift from motorcycles to cars for cheap transportation. Harley-Davidson sought to make up the lost sales abroad and was selling 2,000 units per year in Japan by the middle of the 1920s. In 1932 Harley-Davidson licensed Sankyo Trading Company to build complete motorcycles in Japan, under the name Rikuo, which meant King of the Road.

While being produced in large numbers, very few survive today. Many examples used in China, Mainland Japan and Manchuria were destroyed, a face-saving exercise for both sides and although Rikuo survived the war and produced V-Twins of a smaller capacity by the early '60s the company had ceased to exist.

== See also ==
- Kurogane Type 95
- List of motorcycles of the 1940s
- List of motorcycles of the 1950s
