= Ohta Jidosha =

Former Japanese automotive manufacturer

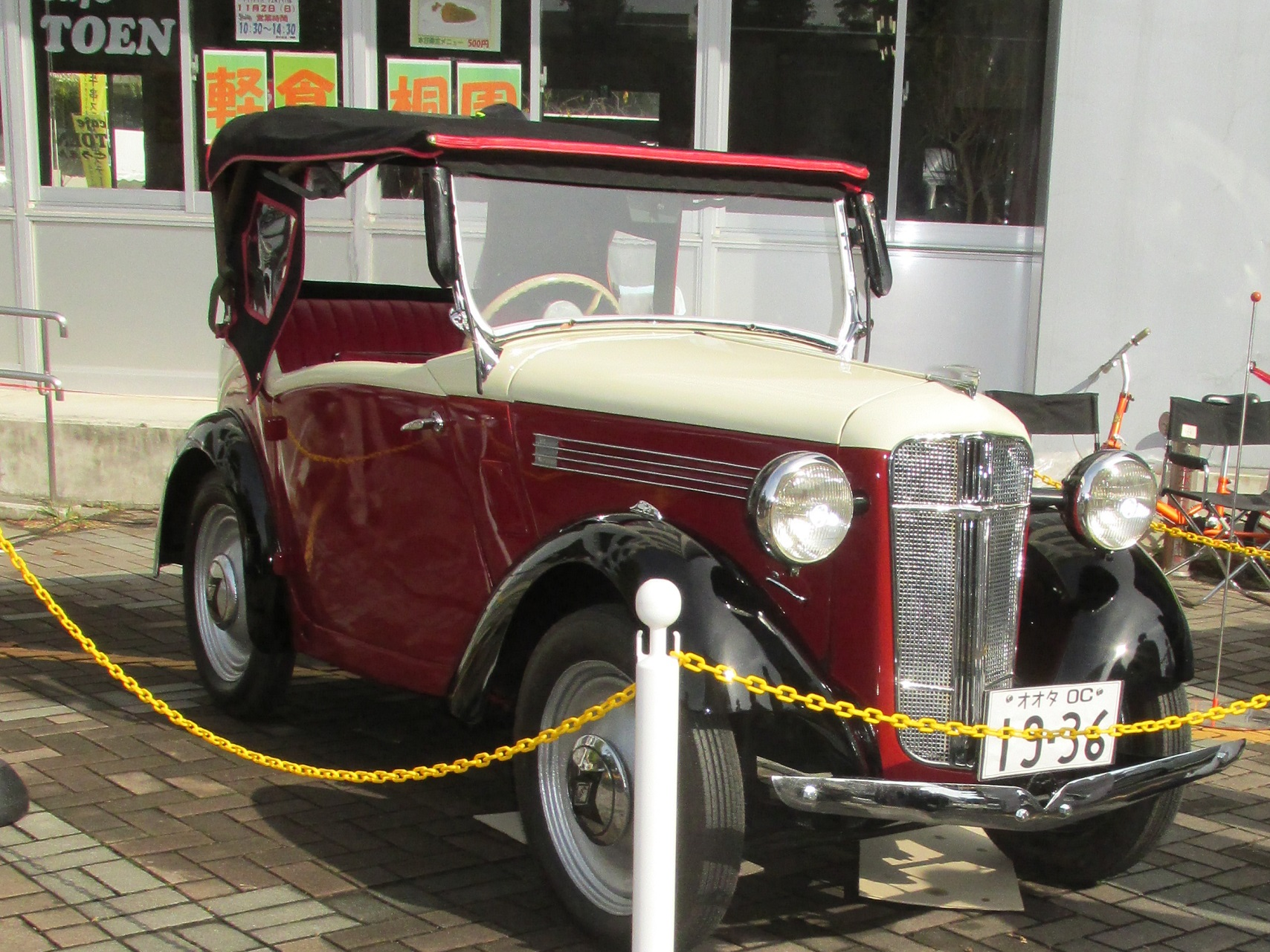
- Industry: Automotive
- Founded: 1922
- Founder: Hiro Ōta
- Defunct: 1957
- Fate: Acquired by Tokyu Kogyo Kurogane
- Headquarters: Tokyo, Japan
- Area served: Japan
- Key people: Yuichi Ōta (design director)
- Products: automobiles

Ohta Jidosha (オオタ自動車, Ōta Jidōsha) was one of the largest Japanese automotive manufacturing companies in the 1930s. The company was established in 1922, and produced cars from 1934 until 1957, when it was acquired by Tokyu Kogyo Kurogane company and ceased auto production. The factory became Omori Works when it became part of Nissan when Kurogane joined the corporate structure.

Ohta Jidosha Seizosho Co., Ltd. was founded in Ōmori, Ōta, Tokyo by Hiro Ōta. His son, Yuichi Ōta, later became design director for the company. In 1922, the company produced a prototype, called the Ohta Model OS. Auto production started in 1934 with the car powered by a 736 cc 4-cylinder engine. The Ohta Model OC was built in 1936, and the Ohta Model OD was produced from 1937 to 1939. The company changed its name to Kosoku Kikan Kogyo Co., Ltd. (高速機関工業) (High Speed Engine Industry) in 1935, and then to Ohta Jidosha Kogyo Co., Ltd. (オオタ自動車工業) in 1947.

After World War II, the company produced the Model PA, which was often used as a taxi. Other models included the Model OE, which resembled a Sunbeam-Talbot, the Model VK-2, and the Model PK-1.

Yuichi Ōta later designed the Datsun DC-3 and the Datsun S211.
