= Rikuo Motorcycle =

Japanese motorcycle manufacturer

1957 Rikuo RQ750
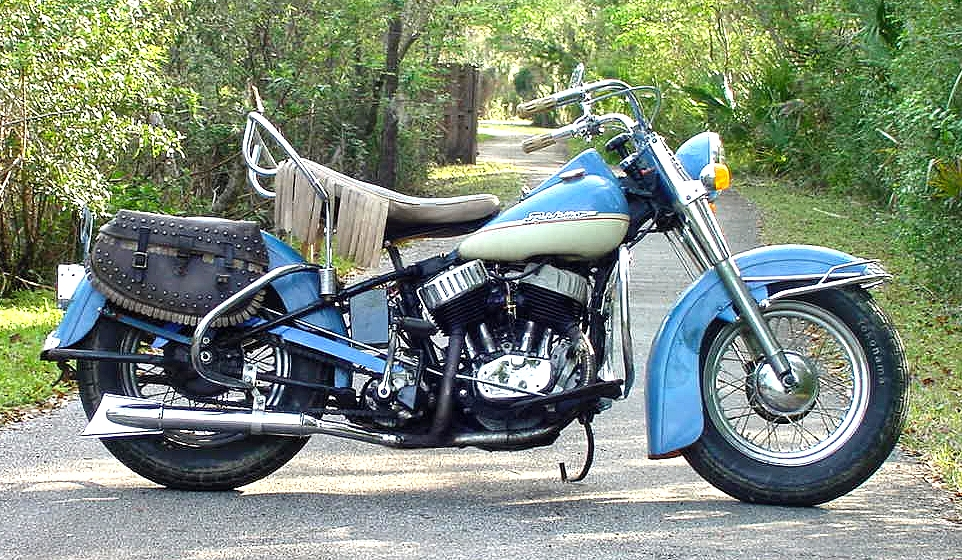
- 1957 Rikuo RQ750
- Manufacturer: Rikuo Nainenki
- Assembly: Hiroshima, Japan
- Predecessor: 750RS
- Class: Standard
- Engine: 747 cc (45.6 cu in) Air Cooled, Side Valve V-Twin
- Top speed: 97 km/h (60 mph)
- Power: 22 hp (16 kW) @ 4250 rpm
- Torque: 4 kg⋅m (39 N⋅m; 29 lbf⋅ft) @ 3000 rpm
- Transmission: 3 Forward, 1 Reverse
- Weight: 230 kg (510 lb) (dry)

Rikuo Internal Combustion Company (陸王内燃機関株式会社, Rikuō Nainenkikan Kabushiki kaisha) was one of the first motorcycle manufacturing companies in Japan. In the early 1930s Rikuo operated under the license and name of Harley-Davidson, using their tooling, and later under the name Rikuo until 1958. Harley-Davidson themselves did not publicize this Japanese connection because the Japanese were helped in developing mass-production techniques by the introduction of this factory into Japan just prior to the Second World War. The Society of Automotive Engineers of Japan (in Japanese) rates the 1935 Rikuoh Large Motorcycle as one of their 240 Landmarks of Japanese Automotive Technology.

== History ==
The production of the Harley-Davidson in Japan resulted in large part from the United Kingdom's McKenna Tariffs modification of 1921. In 1921 the Safeguarding of Industries act placed duties of 33.3 percent on 6500 items. The tariffs were put into place to protect UK industry and levied a steep import duty against the American brands which were seen as damaging the UK motorcycle industry. This had the effect of denying Harley-Davidson one of their largest markets (Australia). At this time there were dozens of Japanese Motorcycle companies which were small shops spread all throughout Japan.

The Japanese government was also alarmed by the damage being done to their economy by Harley-Davidson. In 1924 the Military Subsidy law allowed the government to subsidize certain industries in order to encourage domestic production. Motorcycle production that had been conducted in small shops was now immediately being performed in large factories. Major Japanese industries were now manufacturing motorcycles. Both Murata Iron works and Toyo Kogyo, later called Mazda, tried to copy the Harley-Davidson motorcycle and failed.

During the Great Depression of 1929 Harley-Davidson was on the verge of bankruptcy. Having lost much of their overseas sales to the British Commonwealth nations, Harley-Davidson looked to Japan to make up for their losses.

Rikuo, a licensed copy of the Harley-Davidson, started production in 1929. In 1931 Dabittoson Harley Motorcycle Co., Ltd. was established in Japan. Dabittoson started domestic production of the Harley-Davidson Road King Motorcycle. The 4-cycle, 1200 cc, side-valve V-twin engine produces 28 horsepower for a top speed of 97 km per hour.

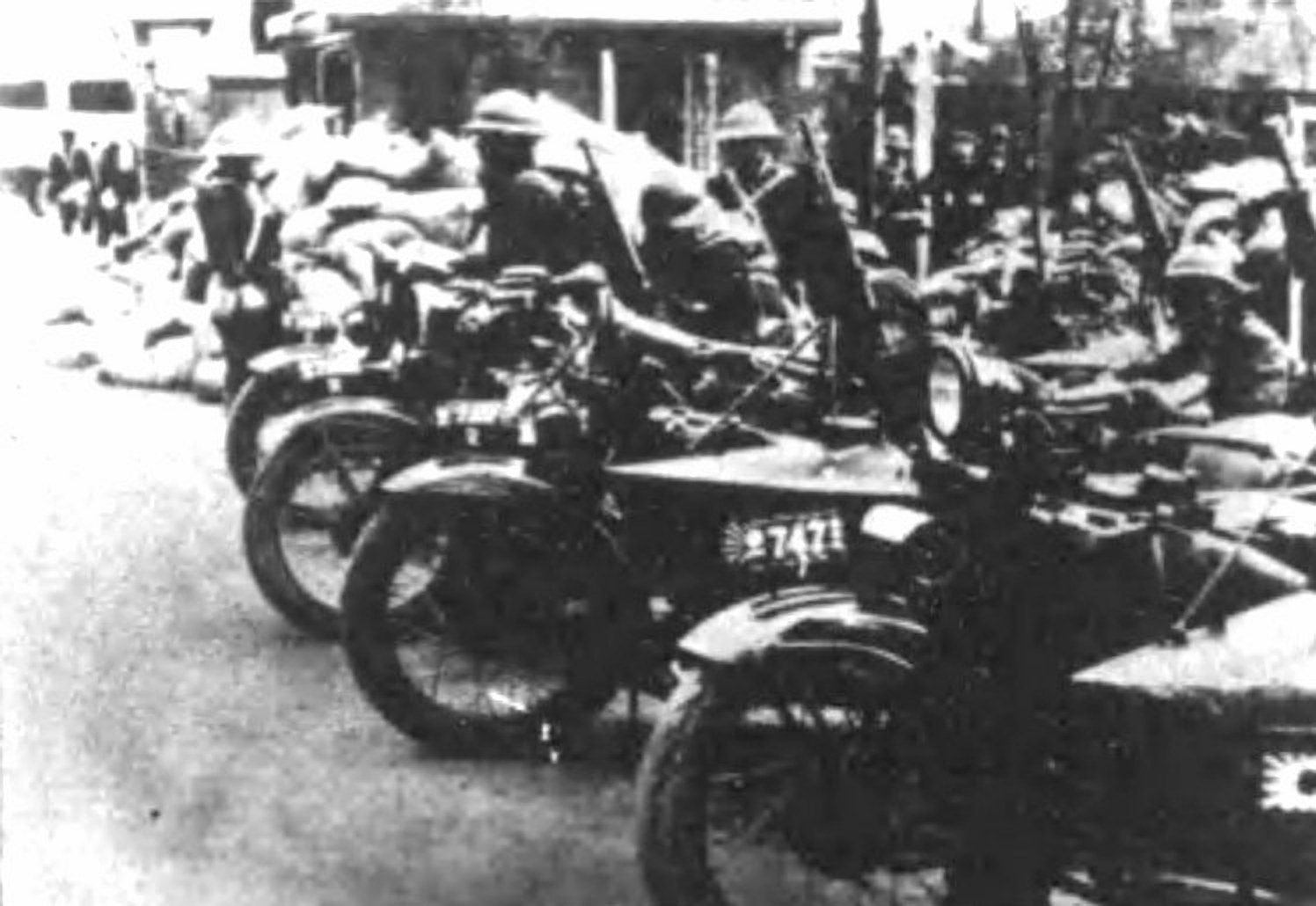
Japanese military Harleys (1932)

The Road King motorcycle was improved and produced by Lin Ritsukawa, and Tsui Meguro under the Tokyu Kogyo Kurogane Company during World War II. This included the Type 97 military motorcycle which was often produced with a sidecar, called they Type 93.

Harley-Davidson, through the efforts of Alfred Rich Child, shipped tooling and personnel to Japan in the mid-1930s to build HD VL flathead (sidevalve) motorcycles.

In 1933 Sankyo Company changed its name to Sankyo Nainenki Co. and produced Harley-Davidson motorcycles under license as the Type 97 for the Japanese military. The Type 97 was made entirely from Japanese components. During their production the company was constantly modernizing the design. Approximately 1500 of these machines were produced for Japanese military use.

When Harley-Davidson was prepared to produce the new EL OHV Knucklehead design, they insisted that the Japanese factory buy the license to produce the EL as well. However Sankyo, Rikuo's parent company, was reluctant to produce the new vehicles and refused to make this commitment.

Japan's government was becoming increasingly militaristic leading up to World War II and eventually suggested that Harley-Davidson employees, including Mr. Child, leave the country. The motorcycle continued to be produced under the name of Rikuo, meaning "Land King" or "Continent King." Rikuo built approximately 18,000 motorcycles between 1937 and 1942, most of which were sold to the Japanese military and Japanese police departments.

Sidecar combinations called Type 97 were produced for military work in the Philippines and Manchuria during the Second World War. Solo machines were supplied to civilian police forces, for example for Osaka in the 1950s.

After the war the remaining factory continued producing the 750 cc (46 cu in) RQ and 1200 cc (74 cubic inch) VLE models still using the old flathead, total-loss lubrication design. The 750 gained a telescopic front suspension and the 1200 model retained springer forks. All of the new motorcycles were made with hardtail rear ends. In 1950 and 1951, the plant produced about fifty 45 cubic inch motors per month and thirty 74s with sidecars. By August 1952 production was estimated at seventy 45s a month while the 74s stayed about the same. The 45 and 74 models are near exact copies of the 1934 Harley-Davidson. An OHV version was prototyped, but never produced.

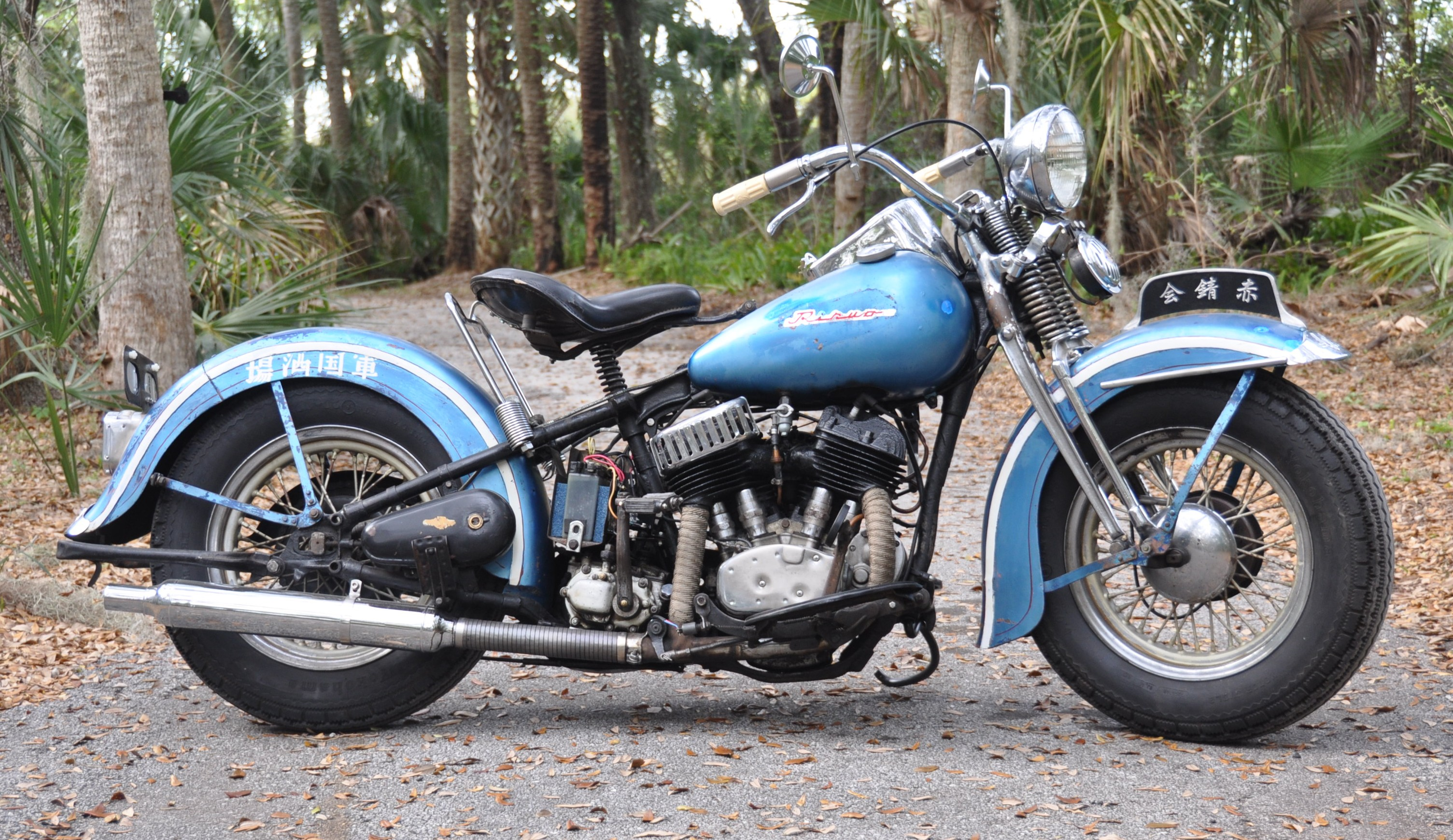
RikuoVL-BluePaint

The factory began to use the "Tele-Glide" type front suspension in or around 1950 on the 750 cc units, but while updating the sheet metal on the VL type, retained the "Springer" type front suspension on those units. Therefore, the 1950s 750s are basically the Harley-Davidson 45 cu.in. RL of the early 1930s, and the 1950s 1200s are the Harley-Davidson VL of the same era, but both with updated sheet metal (the updated front fork of the RQ/RT notwithstanding).

== Sale and End of Rikuo ==
In 1950 Sankyo sold Rikuo to Showa (the same company that supplies parts to HD today) Rikuo manufacturing stopped in 1959 with operations going into bankruptcy in 1960 and the brand ceased to exist by 1962.

== Models ==
- Rikuo RQ 750 cc
- Rikuo VLE 1200 cc
- Rikuo QR750
- Kurogane - three wheel bike
- Rikuo VL- BluePaint
- Rikuo Land King

== Specifications ==
The RQ has a 747 cc engine that develops 22 bhp at 4250 rpm and 4 Kgm of torque at 3000 rpm. The complete motorcycle weighs 230 Kg.
