= Mitsubishi Pajero =

Full-size SUV

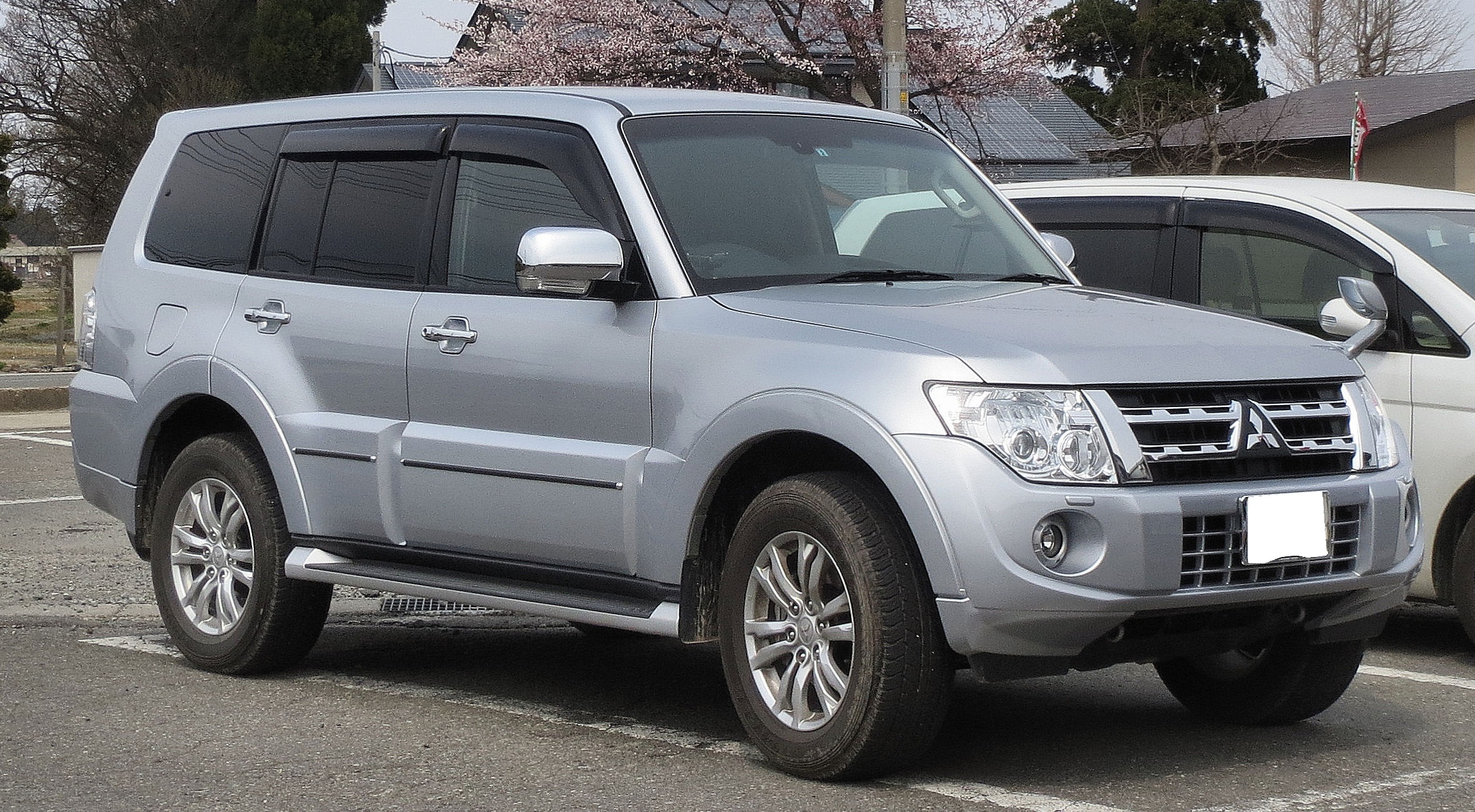

Overview
- Manufacturer: Mitsubishi Motors
- Also called: Mitsubishi Montero (North America, Spain, and Latin America); Mitsubishi Shogun (United Kingdom)
- Production: 1981–2021; 2026–present

Body and chassis
- Class: Full-size SUV
- Layout: Front-engine, four-wheel-drive; Front-engine, rear-wheel-drive (2026–present)
- Chassis: Body-on-frame (1981–1999, 2026–present); Unibody (1999–2021)

Chronology
- Predecessor: Mitsubishi Jeep

The Mitsubishi Pajero (三菱・パジェロ; Japanese: [pad͡ʑeɾo]; English: /pəˈhɛroʊ/; Spanish: [paˈxeɾo]) is a full-size SUV manufactured and marketed globally by Mitsubishi Motors since 1981. It is also known as the Mitsubishi Montero in North America, Spain, and Latin America, and the Mitsubishi Shogun in the United Kingdom.

The Pajero, Montero, and Shogun names were used on other, mechanically unrelated models, such as a kei car with the Pajero Mini, mini SUVs with the Pajero Junior and Pajero iO/Pinin, and mid-size SUVs with the Triton-based Pajero/Montero/Shogun Sport. The Pajero was one of four Mitsubishi models (the others being the Triton, Pajero Sport, and the Pajero iO) that shared Mitsubishi's heavy-duty, off-road-oriented Super-Select four-wheel-drive system, rather than its light-duty Super All Wheel Control (S-AWC) all-wheel-drive system.

The Montero was discontinued in North America in 2006.

Since its global discontinuation in 2021, the Pajero has sold more than 3.3 million units over its 40-year run. The name lived with the smaller Pajero Sport, which is based on the Triton/L200/Strada pickup. Despite the similarity in name, the Pajero Sport shares none of the original Pajero's underpinnings and is smaller in overall size.

The Pajero went on hiatus from 2021 to 2026, with a five-year absence between the fourth and fifth generations.

After a five-year hiatus, the nameplate returned with the fifth generation in late 2026, using a body-on-frame construction based on the sixth-generation Triton/L200, and it features the Super-Select 4WD and S-AWC systems.

== Etymology ==
The Pajero nameplate derives from Leopardus pajeros, the Pampas cat. Mitsubishi marketed the SUV as the Montero in North America, Spain, and Latin America (except for Brazil and Jamaica) due to the term "pajero" being derogatory (meaning "wanker") in Spanish. In the United Kingdom, it was known as the Shogun, named after the Japanese word for "General."

== History ==
The Pajero's history traces to 1934 with the Mitsubishi PX33 prototype commissioned for the Japanese Government. Mitsubishi presented the first Pajero prototype at the Tokyo Motor Show in November 1973 then Pajero II prototype followed in 1978, five years later. The first production version of the Pajero lineage was debuted at the 1981 Tokyo Motor Show before sales officially began in 1982. The Pajero was initially marketed as a luxury, yet rugged and capable competitor to the Land Rover Range Rover or Toyota Land Cruiser of the time.

The first-generation Pajero was selected as a Historic Car by the Japan Automotive Hall of Fame for its contributions to Japanese automotive history in November 2023.

=== Dakar Rally ===
A Mitsubishi Pajero, driven by Andrew Cowan, finished the 1983 Paris–Alger–Dakar as the winner in class, with another teammate George Debussy coming second in class and 14th overall after covering more than 11,000 km, beginning the Pajero's Dakar Rally legacy.

Mitsubishi competed primarily in the Modified Production Class (T2) category though Mitsubishi also ran in the Super-Production category (Highly modified production vehicles with engine tuning and chassis modifications allowed), as well as the T3 category, which were fully-custom non-production vehicles referred to as 'prototypes' by Dakar class criteria. Contrary to popular belief, T2 vehicles are almost identical to those sold to the public. According to the latest criteria, T2 class vehicles must be production models and modifications follow a highly regulated and primarily safety-oriented preparation to ensure they do not deviate from the road-going versions too significantly. As such, modifications primarily only include roll cages, bucket seats, harnesses, navigation equipment and extended fuel tanks. Earlier Paris-Dakar regulations were less strict however and allowed more significant modifications that spawned entrants such as the 1995 Pajero Proto with a wider track, highly tuned engine and custom body.

Mitsubishi dominated with multiple first, second and third place podium finishes across the T2 and T3 categories beginning in 1983 until their final wins in 2007. Their overall record was 12 total overall wins (1st place) in the "Cars Class" and 150 stage wins (the second best being Peugeot with only 78 stage wins in comparison). Mitsubishi earned the title of ‘Most Dakar Rally Wins by A Manufacturer’ from the Guinness World Records.

Given their competition in the T2 class, vehicles were required by entry regulations to be almost identical to road-going versions, using the same chassis and engine. However, in the late 90s Mitsubishi intended to create a vehicle with the sole intention of winning the T2 class. Adding independent rear suspension to the Generation 2 design - something not found on road versions (this formed the basis of their later Generation 3 and 4 suspensions) as well as a modified 6G74 engine, this new revision resulted in immense performance advantages. In order to compete in the T2 category, Mitsubishi was required to produce road-going versions of their new design, which resulted in the Mitsubishi Pajero Evolution, a rare road-going variant of their late 1990s Generation 2 Dakar platform. Only 2,693 units were produced and are now seen as a collector's item. From 2000 and the introduction of the Generation 3, Mitsubishi's regular series production was more than enough for T2 entry as there were no significant differences to the Dakar platforms until 2002.

From 2002 onwards and new rule changes allowing full-prototype vehicles without requiring any sort of homologation, Mitsubishi began their 'Evolution' entries, code-named MR10 through MR14. These vehicles featured exclusive designs and engines engineered specifically for the Paris-Dakar and never intended for the general public, such as the 6G7 Di-D quad-turbo diesel and a 4.0L V6 petrol, both based on an overbored and stroked 6G75 MIVEC.

In 2017, Cristina Gutiérrez debuted her international rally career as the first Spanish woman to compete the Dakar rally, in her modified short wheelbase Mitsubishi Pajero finishing in 44th place.

== First generation (L040, L140; 1982) ==
First generation
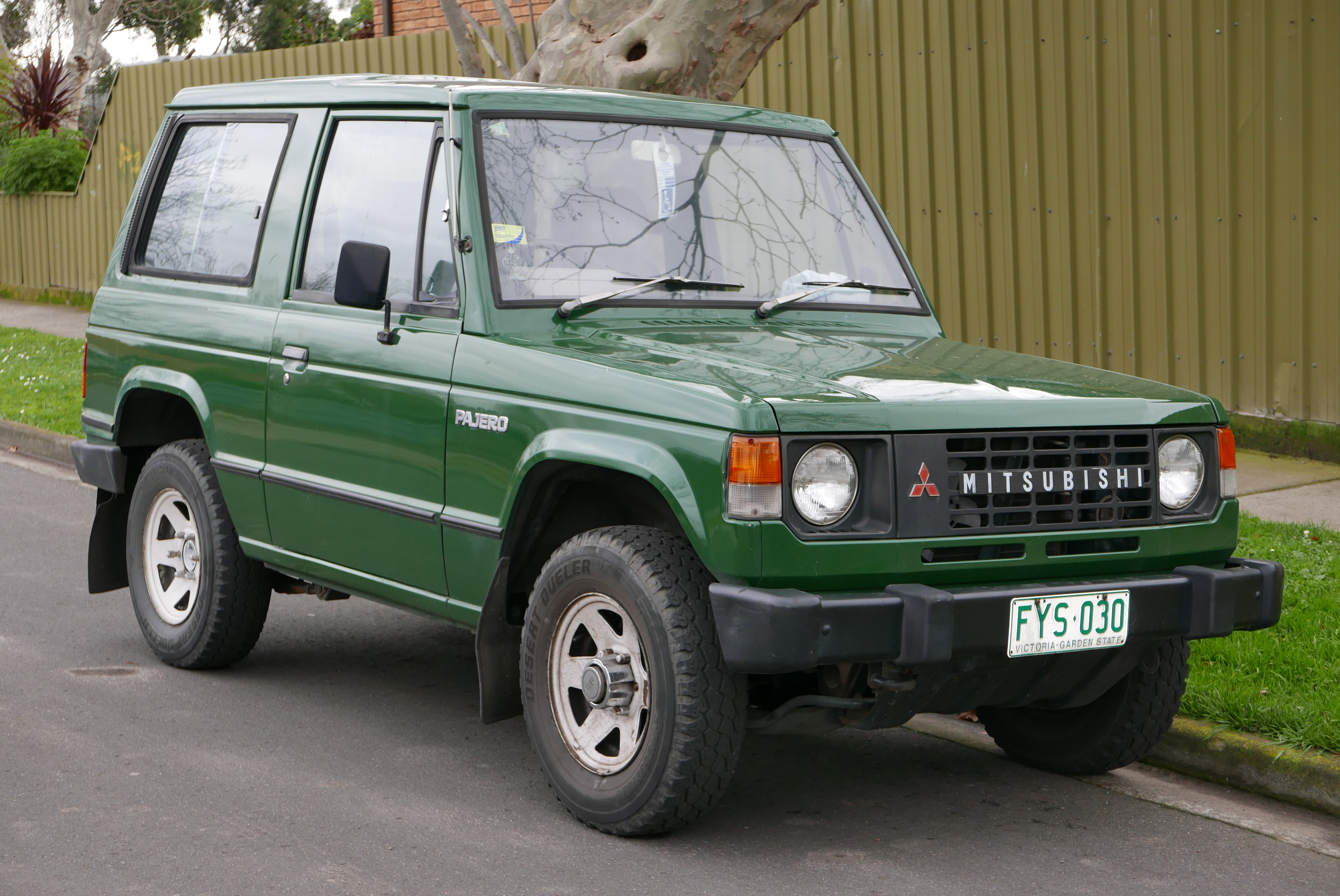

Overview
- Also called: Mitsubishi Montero; Mitsubishi Shogun; Colt Shogun; Dodge Raider; Hyundai Galloper; Jinhui Mitsubishi Pajero (China; JV); Hawtai Jitian (China)
- Production: 1982–1991
- Assembly: Japan: Sakahogi, Gifu (Pajero Manufacturing Co., Ltd); Portugal: Tramagal (Tramagauto, Mitsubishi Fuso Truck Europe); Philippines: Cainta (MMPC); China: Zhuhai, Guangdong; South Korea: Ulsan (Hyundai Precision Products); Malaysia: Pekan, Pahang (AMM)
- Designer: Kiyoshi Honda (1980)

Body and chassis
- Body style: 3-door SUV; 5-door SUV (not on Raider models)
- Related: Mitsubishi Delica (second generation)

Powertrain
- Engine: Petrol: 2.0 L 4G63 I4; 2.6 L 4G54 I4; 3.0 L 6G72 V6; Diesel: 2.3 L 4D55 I4; 2.3 L 4D55T turbo I4; 2.5 L 4D56T turbo I4
- Transmission: 5-speed manual 4-speed Aisin automatic

Dimensions
- Wheelbase: 5-door: 2,695 mm (106.1 in); 3-door: 2,350 mm (92.5 in)
- Length: 4,650 mm (183.1 in); 3-door: 3,995 mm (157.3 in)
- Width: 1,679 mm (66.1 in) & 1,692 mm (66.6 in)
- Height: 5-door: 1,890 mm (74.4 in); 3-door: 1,849 mm (72.8 in) & 1,839 mm (72.4 in)

Chronology
- Successor: Dodge Nitro (For Dodge Raider)

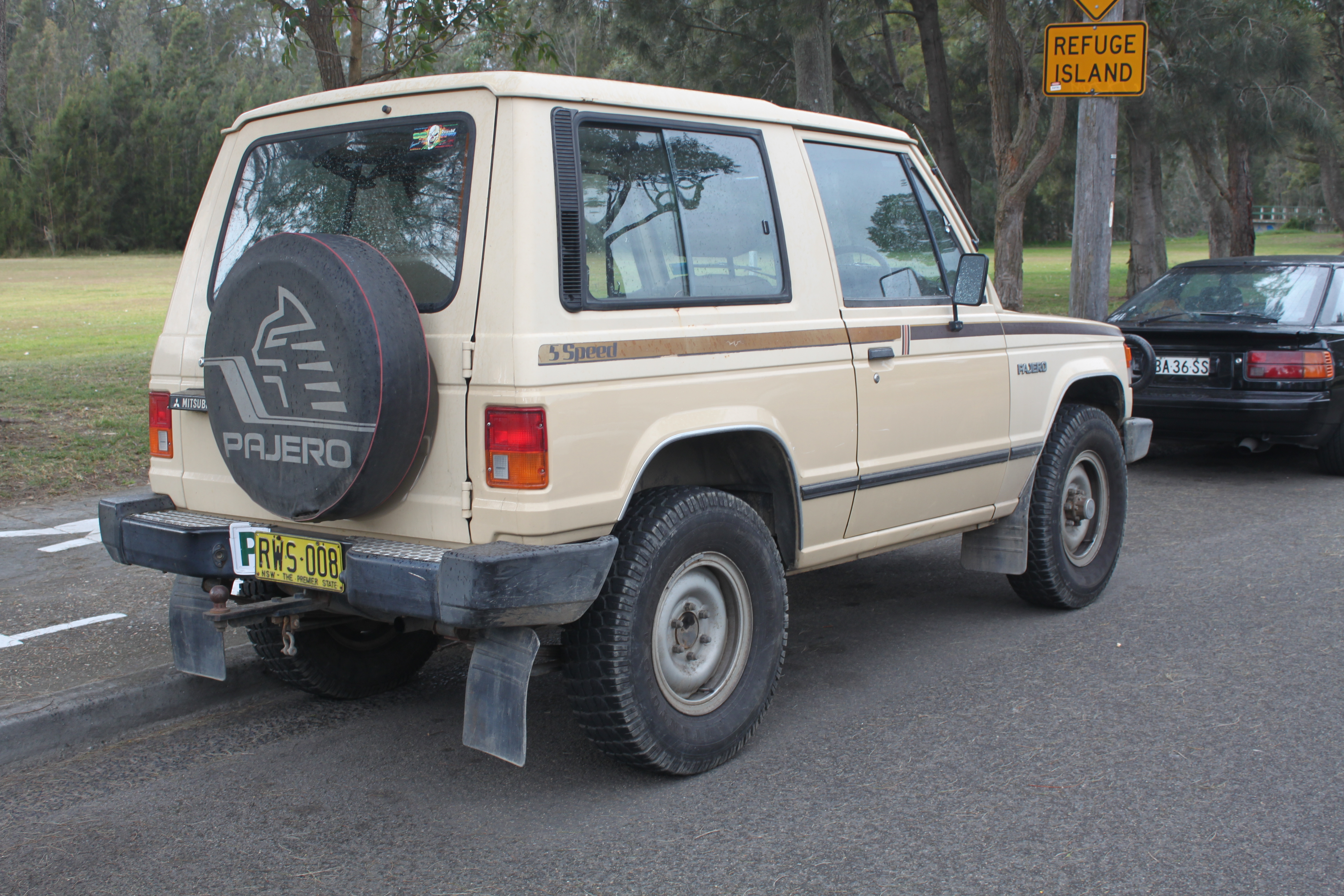
Mitsubishi Pajero 3-door

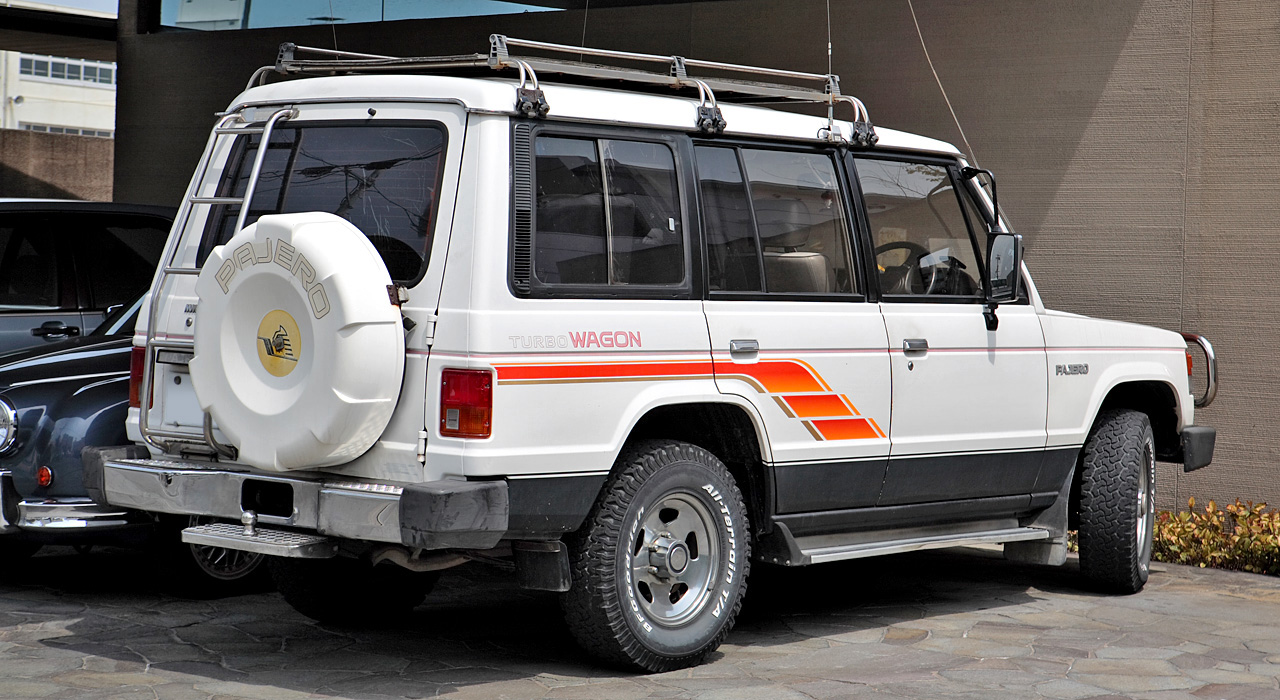
Mitsubishi Pajero 5-door

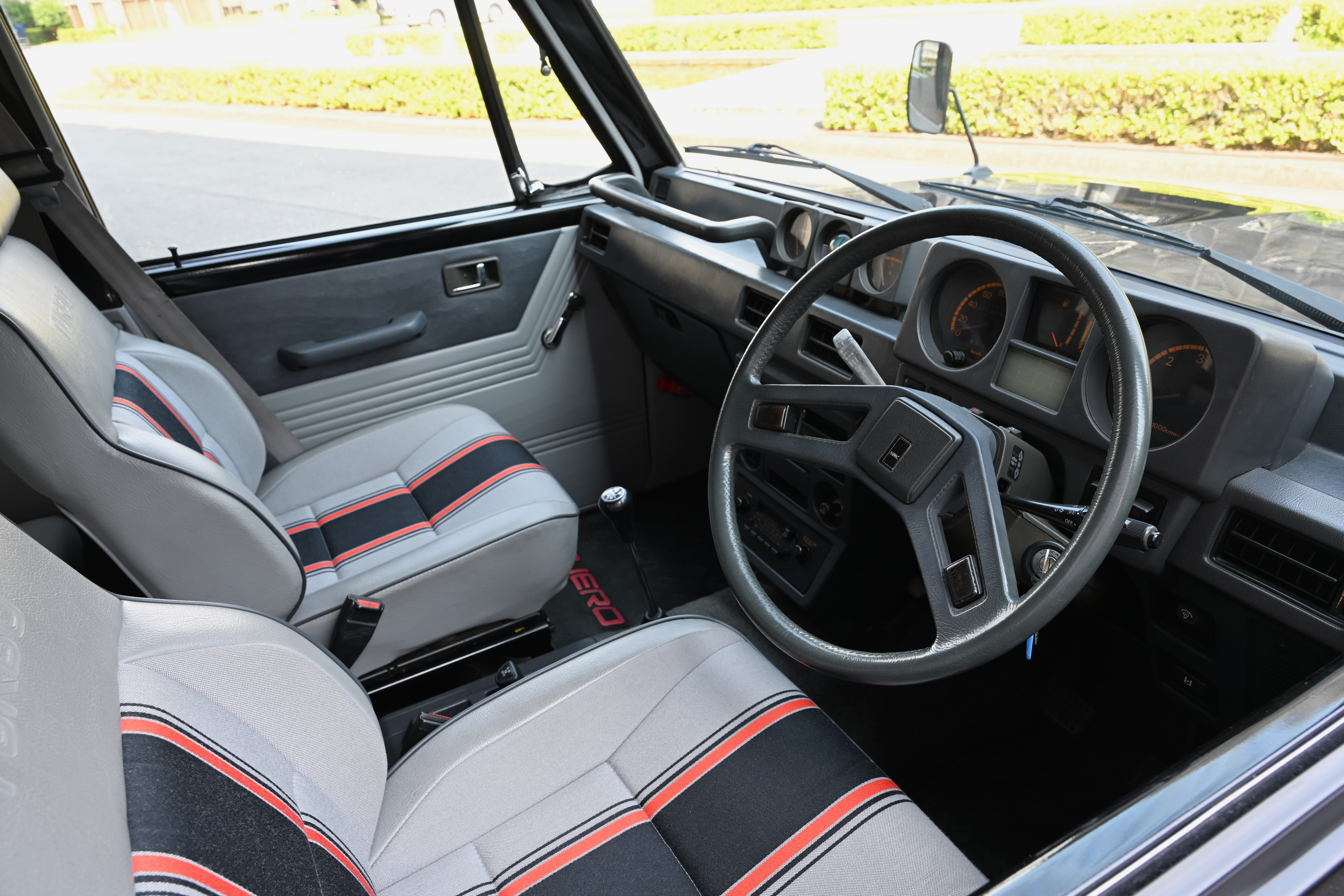
Interior

The design adopts the Pajero II concept that was introduced in Tokyo Motor Show in 1979. It was a design study model with an open FRP body with square twin headlights mounted on the chassis of the Forte 4WD pickup. The first generation made its debut at the Tokyo Motor Show in October 1981. Although the design style was well received, Mitsubishi eventually launched in May 1982, with a design very similar to its concept model, the Pajero II. It was officially replacing the Mitsubishi Jeep Delivery Wagon.

Initially, it was a three-door, short-wheelbase model available with a metal or canvas top and three different engines options, although more were gradually added, ending with a 3.0-litre V6 on top of the range.

- 2.0-litre 4-cylinder petrol
- 2.0-litre 4-cylinder turbocharged petrol
- 2.6-litre 4-cylinder petrol
- 3.0-litre V6 SOHC petrol
- 2.3-litre naturally aspirated diesel
- 2.3-litre turbocharged diesel
- 2.5-litre turbocharged diesel

It included features that were unusual for a four-wheel-drive vehicle: a turbocharged diesel engine, a front double wishbone suspension with torsion bar springs, power steering and suspension seats.

In January 1983, only a year following its launch, mildly-tuned production Pajeros entered the world of motor sport.

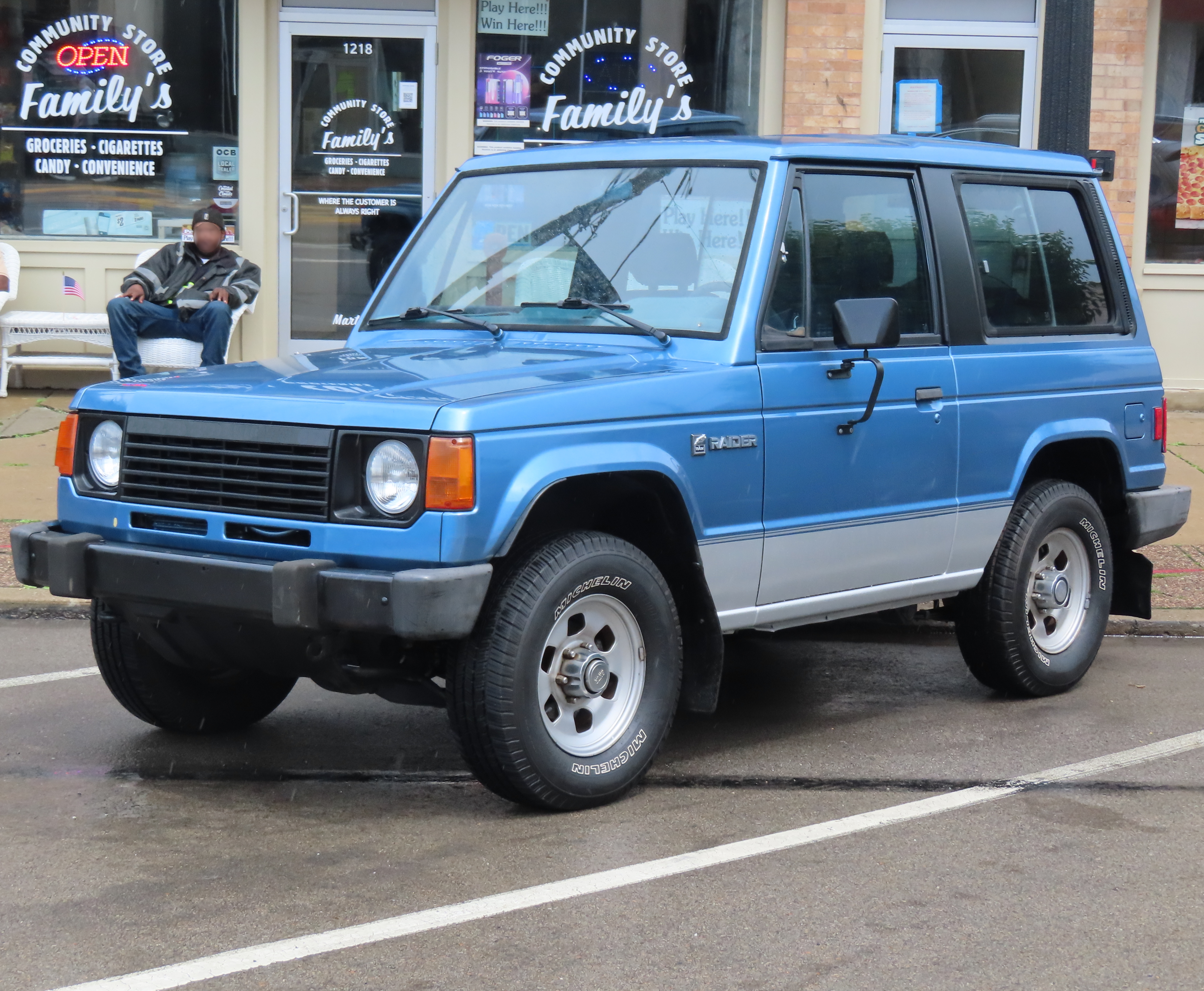
Dodge Raider

In February 1983, Mitsubishi introduced a long-wheelbase, five-door model, available with a choice of two different engines; a 2.0-litre turbocharged petrol (badged as "2.0 Turbo" and "2000 Turbo" in some markets) and a 2.3-litre turbocharged diesel. It also came in Standard, Semi-High Roof. The High Roof variant was added in July 1983. Outside of Japan there was also the 2.6-liter petrol four, which produced 103 PS (76 kW) in European trim.

The long-wheelbase model increased seating capacity to seven, with available third row seats, which could be folded to the sides for additional trunk space or combined with second row seats to form a bed.

In 1984, the Pajero received turbo diesel engines with higher power/torque ratings, whilst the long-wheelbase models received standard four-wheel disc brakes and four-way adjustable shock absorbers as standard equipment later in 1985.

In April 1985, the 4-speed automatic transmission was added.

A flagship model was introduced in September 1987 with the badge 'Exceed', with two-tone paint, 15-inch alloy wheels, light brown interior, two-stage front heated seats, adjustable suspension seats, rear-air conditioning, remote locking and unlocking tailgate, wool plaid seat and door trim, leather headrests, a three-spoke steering wheel and a sound system with radio/cassette. JDM Super Exceed models featured additional amber spotlights, a steel bullbar, an enhanced audio system and other Japanese market-specific additions such as illuminated corner positioning poles. In 1987, a version of the Pajero/Montero was rebadged by Dodge as the Raider, which ran through 1989.

In 1988, a 3.0-litre SOHC V6 engine was made available across the range, alongside a 2.5-litre turbo diesel engine, with the first intercooler fitted to a 4x4. The long-wheelbase models received a coil link suspension system for better ride comfort and off-road ability.

The 1988 and onward model was available with a 3-door body for a short wheelbase (SWB) or a 5-door body for a long-wheelbase (LWB). Engines included a 2.6 L I4 with 82 kW (111 PS; 110 hp), a 3.0 L V6 with EFI and 104 kW (141 PS; 139 hp) and a turbocharged 2.5 L OHC diesel I4 with 62 kW (84 PS; 83 hp) or an intercooled 70 kW (95 PS; 94 hp). Part-time four-wheel drive was standard on all models.

The first generation platform was later built under license by Hyundai Precision Products as the Hyundai Galloper from 1991 to 2003, and exported to Europe for a brief time starting in 1997. When it was first introduced, the appearance was nearly indistinguishable from the first-generation Pajero. For the revised Galloper introduced in 1997, the Galloper's body was restyled to appear similar to the second generation Pajeros, but the chassis was the same, using the first generation Pajero mechanicals.

=== Australia ===
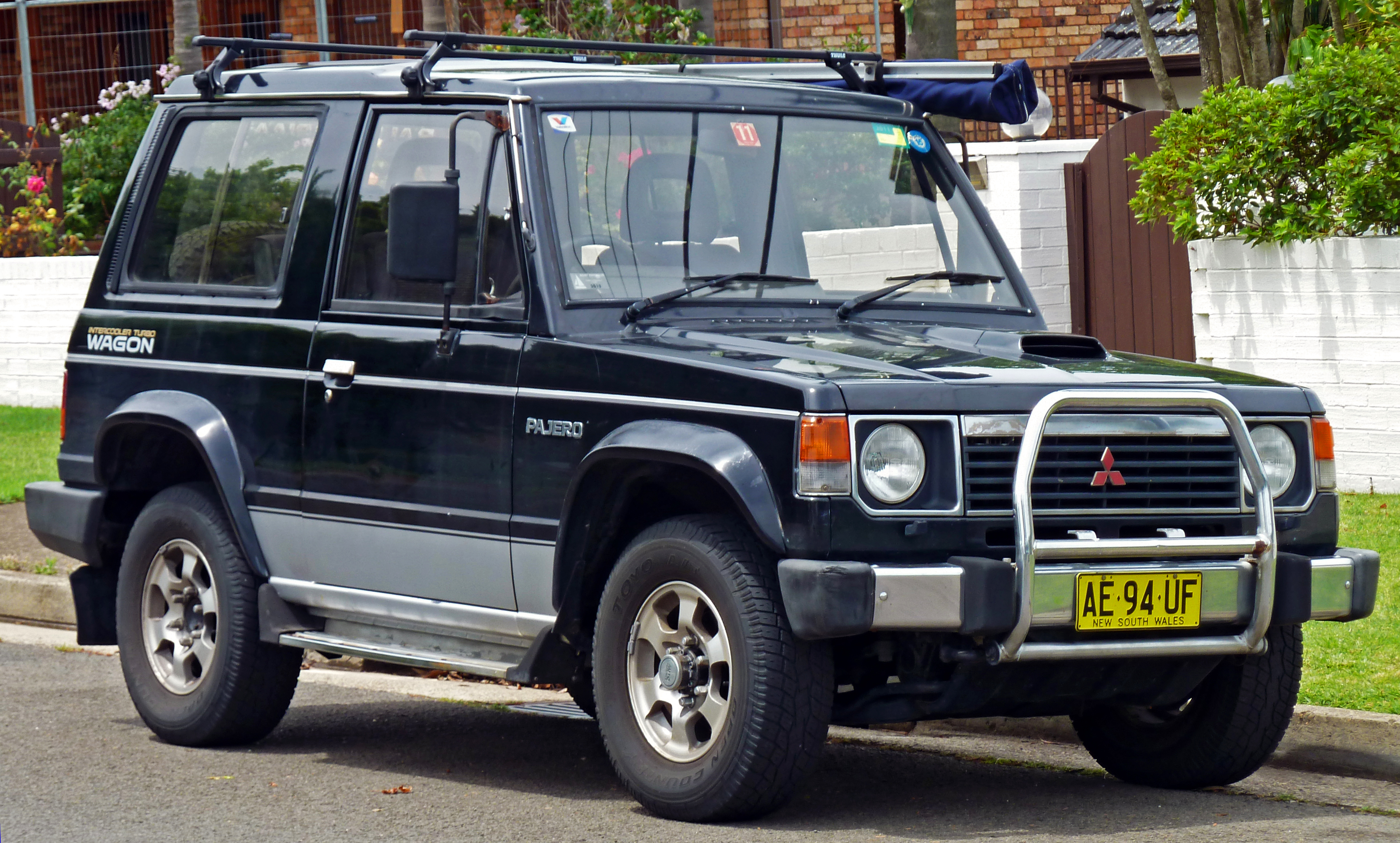
1988 facelift

The NA series was released to Australia during January 1983 in short- (SWB) and long-wheelbase (LWB) three-door wagon formats, with the 2.6-litre petrol or 2.3-litre turbo diesel, both mated to a five-speed KM145 manual transmission. Brakes were ventilated front discs and rear drums. The five-door, high-roof LWB model was introduced in May 1984 with the same powertrain options. The five-door offered a luxury Superwagon trim and also had a shorter final drive than the SWB models, to make up for the increased weight.

The NB of November 1984 included a revised grille, deleted the LWB three-door body style and the diesel engine for the remaining SWB three-door. Mitsubishi Australia released the NC series in November 1985, introducing optional power steering, while the long-wheelbase five-door switched to a low-roofed design.

A KM148 automatic gearbox became optional on the petrol Superwagon for the October 1986 ND update, while the 2.5-litre turbo diesel replaced the old 2.3-litre unit. For the October 1987 NE series, the Japanese 2.6-litre petrol was replaced with the Australian-made Astron II version. Brake dimensions were also increased across the range.

The NE three-door Sports and five-door Superwagon added a limited slip differential, front bumper overriders, spare wheel cover, side pin striping, 16-inch chrome wheels, and optional two-tone paint over the base cars. The most expensive models also received an inclinometer, volt meter, oil pressure gauge, stereo cassette player, remote fuel filler release, suspension driver's seat, carpeting, and tweed and velour cloth trim (over tweed cloth and vinyl).

September 1988's NF facelift saw the introduction of a 3.0-litre V6 engine in the top-line Superwagon, delivering 105 kW (143 PS; 141 hp) and 228 N⋅m (168 lb⋅ft) via a five-speed V5MT1 manual or four-speed KM148 automatic. Suspension became a three-link coil spring design at the rear. Rear disc brakes were fitted to the V6 only.

The final NG refresh from September 1989 to April 1991 was a minor trim and equipment readjustment. The KM148 automatic transmission was replaced by the V4AW2 with lockup. High-end NG models (i.e. not the base Commercial trim) now received chrome, truck-style side mirrors. An intercooler was also added to the 2.5-litre turbo diesel models in 1990.

=== Motor Sports ===
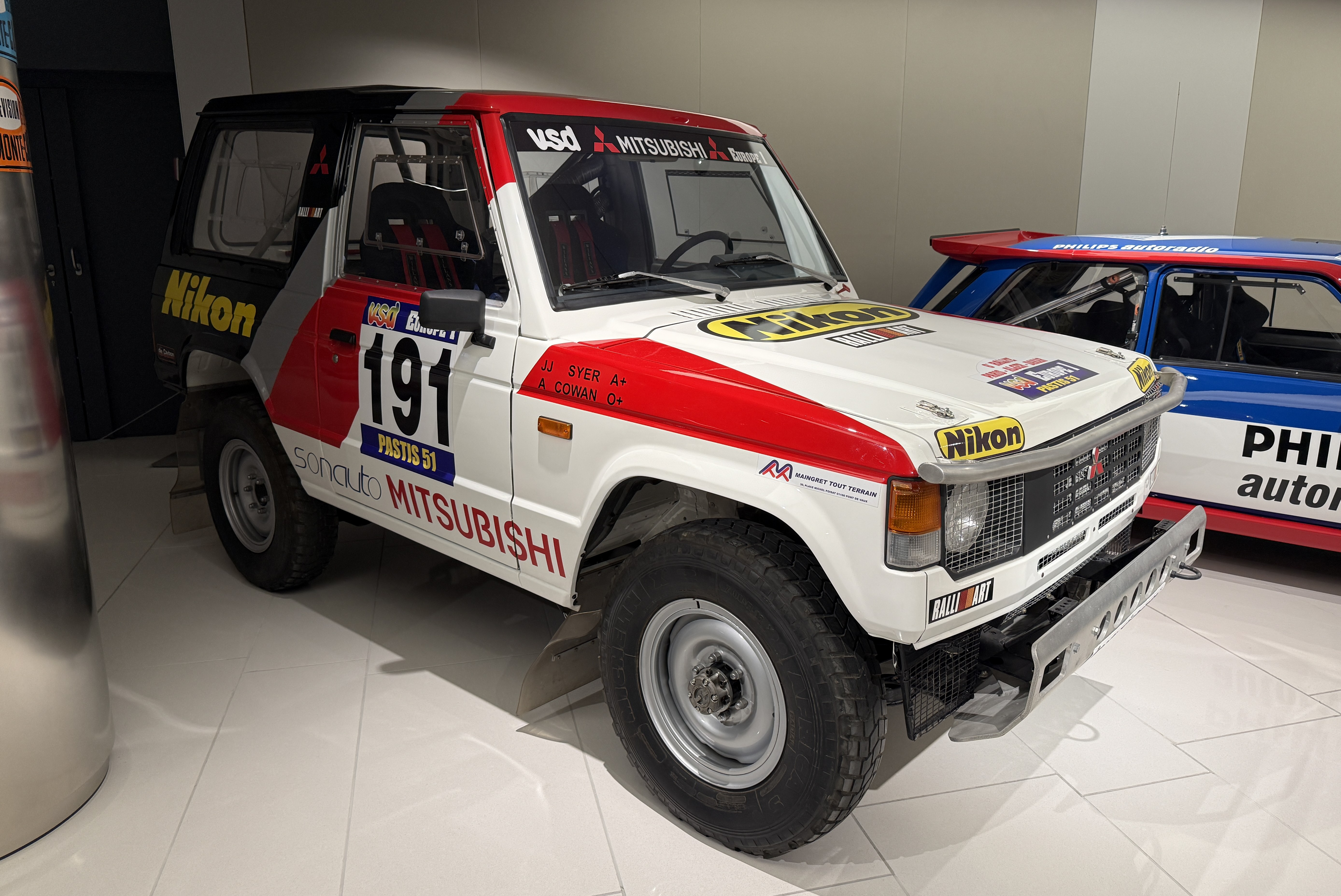
1985 Paris Dakar Rally winner driven by Andre Cowan

The 1984 Dakar Rally Mitsubishi using the 2 units Pajeros for the 1984 Dakar Rally. It was featured 2.6L turbo petrol 4G54 engines. In 1984, Mitsubishi won third place with #191 Pajero driven by Andre Cowan. It passes the from Paris to Burkina Faso, Ivory Coast, Sierra Leone and Guinea at a distance of approximately at 9980 km.

The Camel Trophy was a vehicle-oriented competition that was held annually between 1980 and 2000, and it was best known for its use of Land Rover vehicles over challenging terrain. The event took its name from its main sponsor, the Camel cigarette brand. The first event was originally intended as a one-off publicity stunt for Camel tobacco. This came about after six Germans had the idea of driving the notoriously tough Transamazonica Highway in Brazil; 1600 km of dusty, rutted, broken dirt road with several treacherous river crossings through the Amazon.

Though little information is available online, Mitsubishi entered several long wheelbase, first generation Pajeros in the Camel Trophy and even created a limited "Camel Trophy Edition" to commemorate the event and their participation. Interestingly the limited edition versions were short wheelbase whereas the actual competing vehicles were long wheelbase due to the need to carry large amounts of equipment. The competing and Camel Trophy Edition vehicles both featured 2.5L turbo diesel 4D56 engines with a 5 speed manual transmission.

The special accessories these vehicles came with are the now iconic mustard yellow body and wheel paint, Camel Trophy logo on the driver and passenger doors, floor mats, seats and spare tyre cover, PTO winch, a recovery kit with shovel, black powder-coated roof rack and a special bush knife. Only 150 of this edition were ever made, though enthusiasts have created replicas using their own SWB Pajeros with spare parts that were still available from OEM part stockists. Currently many of these parts can still be found in dealer inventories.

Original Camel Trophy editions can be identified by a yellow and black plaque inside the vehicle and a special chassis code (VNTX5).

== Second generation (V20, V30, V40; 1991) ==
Second generation
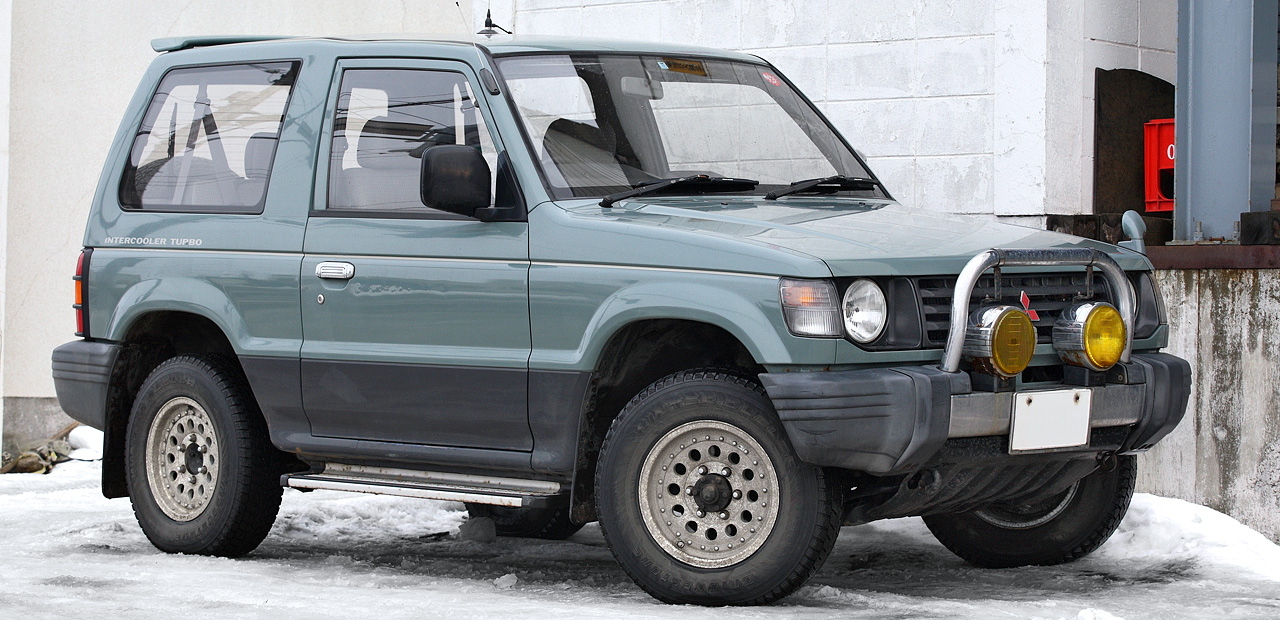
- 1991 pre-facelift Pajero (3-door)

Overview
- Also called: Mitsubishi Shogun (UK); Mitsubishi Pajero Fieldmaster (Philippines); Mitsubishi Montero; Galloper Super Exceed (Spain); China: Changfeng Liebao Heijingang (2002–2014); Changfeng Liebao Qibing/6481 (2009–2014); Changfeng Liebao Q6 (2014–2021); Guangtong GTQ5490 (JV); Jincheng Pioneer GDQ6470/6471 (JV); Jinhui Mitsubishi Montero (JV); Sanjiu 3-Nine Mitsubishi Pajero (JV); Sanxing SXZ6470/6471 (JV); Shanlu CJY6421D (JV); Wanli WLZ5030XLD (JV); Xinkai HXK2020 (JV); Leopaard Pajero; Leopaard Liebao; Leopaard Q6 (also known as the Pyeonghwa Ppeokkugi 2417 in North Korea)
- Production: 1991–1999 (Japan); 1993–2000 (Thailand); 1993–2008 (Philippines); 1994–2012 (Colombia); 1997–2001 (China: Shanlu); 2002–2012 (India); 2002–2021 (China: GAC Changfeng); 2005–2007 (Iran: Bahman Group); 1999–2005 (Spain: Galloper España)
- Assembly: Japan: Sakahogi, Gifu (Pajero Manufacturing Co., Ltd.); Indonesia: Pademangan, North Jakarta (KKM); Philippines: Cainta, Rizal (MMPC); Bangladesh: Chittagong (Progoti); India: Tiruvallur, Tamil Nadu (Hindustan-Mitsubishi); Malaysia: Pekan, Pahang (DRB-HICOM); Colombia: Bogotá (CCA); Venezuela; China: Beijing (BAW); Changsha, Hunan (GAC Changfeng; from 1995); Chengdu, Sichuan (Shanlu); Minhou, Fujian (Bamin); Zhanjiang, Guangdong (Sanxing, Wanli, Xinkai); Zhuhai, Guangdong (Guangtong, Jinhui, Sanjiu); Qinhuangdao (Jincheng)
- Designer: Ken Yamamoto (1988)

Body and chassis
- Body style: 2-door convertible (J-top); 3-door SUV; 5-door SUV

Powertrain
- Engine: Petrol: 2.0 L 4G63T turbo I4 (China, 2015–2017); 2.2 L 4RB3 I4 (China); 2.4 L 4G64 I4; 2.4 L Toyota 2TZ-FE I4 (China, 2015–2017); 2.4 L BJ492 I4 (China); 2.6 L 4G54 I4; 3.0 L 6G72 V6; 3.5 L 6G74 V6; Diesel: 2.5 L 4D56 turbo I4; 2.5 L DK4A turbo I4 (China); 2.8 L 4M40 turbo I4
- Transmission: 5-speed manual 4-speed Aisin automatic 5-speed V5A51 Mitsubishi automatic

Dimensions
- Wheelbase: 5-door, Changfeng Liebao models: 2,725 mm (107.3 in); 3-door: 2,420 mm (95.3 in); 2,750 mm (108.3 in) (Beijing BJ2032 Tornado)
- Length: 3-door: 4,140 mm (163.0 in); 5-door: 4,704–4,740 mm (185.2–186.6 in); 4,879 mm (192.1 in) (Beijing BJ2032 Tornado); 4,801 mm (189 in) (Liebao Heijinggang/Qibing)
- Width: 1998–1999: 1,775 mm (69.9 in); 1992–1997: 1,694–1,786 mm (66.7–70.3 in); 1,829 mm (72 in) (Beijing BJ2032 Tornado, Liebao Heijinggang); 1,791 mm (70.5 in) (Liebao Heijinggang/Qibing); 1,796 mm (70.7 in) (Liebao Q6)
- Height: 1992–1994 5-door: 1,864–1,880 mm (73.4–74.0 in); 1995–1999 5-door: 1,875–1,895 mm (73.8–74.6 in); 3-door: 1,849 mm (72.8 in); 1,801 mm (70.9 in) (Beijing BJ2032 Tornado); 1,890 mm (74.4 in) (Liebao Heijinggang/Q6); 1,941 mm (76.4 in) (Liebao Q6 with roof rack); 1,946 mm (76.6 in) (Liebao Heijinggang/Qibing)

Mitsubishi redesigned the Pajeros for a second generation, which debuted in January 1991, although exports did not commence until later in the year. Just about everything was now new and further enhanced. A new, larger body was available in four different versions; Metal Top, Canvas Top Convertible (short wheelbase), Semi High Roof Wagon and High Roof Wagon (long wheelbase). The short wheelbase models were stretched by 70 millimetres (2.8 in) and the long-wheelbase models by 30 millimetres (1.2 in). ` The available engines included a 3.0-litre 12-valve SOHC V6 (6G72) with ECI-Multi electronic fuel injection and a 2.5-litre turbocharged diesel engine (4D56T) with an intercooler. The 4D56T used a top-mounted intercooler with an innovative method of providing airflow. Using two hidden scoops at the top of the grille, these guided air through two ducts in the bonnet that merged into one above the intercooler. The high location and solid bonnet (no scoop or grille) protected the intercooler better than a more exposed location, while also keeping the piping short, resulting in less boost lag. While enhancing durability, this method of airflow is less efficient than a standard top-mounted scoop as the air that flowed through these channels was warmed by rising engine heat. This design was replaced by a standard top-mounted intercooler scoop in later 4M40 models.

The second generation also saw the introduction of Super Select 4WD (SS4) [known as Active Trac 4WD in some markets], Multi-Mode ABS and electronic shock absorbers, which were firsts on Japanese four-wheel drives. SS4 was ground-breaking in the sense that it combined the advantages of part-time and full-time four-wheel drive with four available options: 2H (high-range rear-wheel drive), 4H (high-range full-time four-wheel drive), 4HLc (high-range four-wheel drive with locked centre differential) and 4LLc (low-range four-wheel drive with locked centre differential). Another advantage of this second generation system is that it gave the driver the ability to switch between two-wheel drive and full-time four-wheel drive at speeds up to 80 km/h (50 mph), whereas the first generation Pajero, which used a traditional 4WD system had to be stationary to switch from rear-wheel drive to four-wheel drive (but not from four-wheel drive back to rear-wheel drive). In addition to the SS4, a pneumatic locking differential was included as a factory option. The transfer case is required to be in 4HLc or 4LLc to engage the rear locking differential. Multi-mode ABS, on the other hand, was equally innovative. This meant ABS would be fully functional in all modes of SS4, as braking with a locked centre differential requires completely different braking parameters. Additionally, vehicles were fitted with load proportioning valves, which used spring loaded levers on the differential that compressed when payload was increased, subsequently automatically providing more braking force when the vehicle was heavily laden. The new electronic shock absorber was also factory option with three settings: S (Soft), M (Medium), and H (Hard). This allowed the driver to change ride quality and handling depending on road conditions via a switch on centre console.

Depending on the market, some Pajeros came equipped with an optional "Winter Package" that included dual batteries, heated front seats, heated door mirrors and a rear cabin heater. JDM (Japanese Domestic Market) versions of the Pajero came fitted with chrome front and rear bumpers while export models typically featured powdercoated blue-grey bumpers with embedded brake and indicator lights on the rear.

In July 1993, two new power plants were introduced; a 3.5-litre 24-valve DOHC with ECI-Multi and a 2.8-litre turbocharged diesel with an intercooler. A new, larger transmission and transfer case was also part of the upgrade.

In 1996, the 3.0 V6 engine was revised, staying SOHC but changing to 24 valves. At the same time the ignition system was upgraded from the old distributor system to solid state coil packs. Power increased to 132 kW (177 hp). The 2.4 L engine was introduced as a smaller power plant; available only in the SWB with revised minor interior and exterior.

In 1998, vehicles destined for General Export and the GCC (Gulf Cooperation Council countries) received a facelift. Wider fenders, new headlights, grille, bumper, fog lights and sidesteps were all part of the redesign. The wide fenders are often called "blister flare fenders". Driver and front-passenger SRS airbags were made standard on models equipped with the 3.5-litre DOHC V6 engine, whilst still remaining optional on GLS models with the 3.0-litre SOHC V6. 1080 of these units were also assembled in Iran by Bahman Khodro Group before being taken off production. An upgraded interior wood trim was made available on 3.0-litre GLS and 3.5-litre models. A leather-wrapped or leather and wood trim steering wheel was also made available, alongside an upgraded suspension and steering system. The 3.0-litre 12-valve SOHC engine was now available with a 24-valve configuration. Models without wide fenders remained as base models (GLX), available with a 2.4-litre 16-valve DOHC engine, producing 110 kW (147 hp). The 3.0-litre 12-valve engine was optional on these GLX models, and remained the base engine on the GLS.

The second generation was introduced on 22 January 1991 and manufactured in Japan until 1999. It retained the two body styles, but design was rounder and more city-friendly than the previous bulky model. The 3.0 L V6 petrol engine was retained, now available with a 24-valve head, capable of 136 kW (185 PS; 182 hp), while the 2.5 turbodiesel's power was slightly increased to 73 kW (99 PS; 98 hp). In 1993, the Pajero was slightly restyled, and larger engines were introduced, a 3.5 L V6 with 153 kW (208 PS; 205 hp) and a 2.8 L SOHC turbo-diesel rated at 92 kW (125 PS; 123 hp). These versions introduced Mitsubishi's Super Select four-wheel-drive system (known as Active-Trac in the United States), with an electronic transfer shift that could split power between both axles without the need to stop the car. It worked at speeds up to 100 km/h (62 mph).

The first generation Pajero was also marketed as the Hyundai Galloper in Korea, Europe and GCC Countries, while the second generation was in production elsewhere.

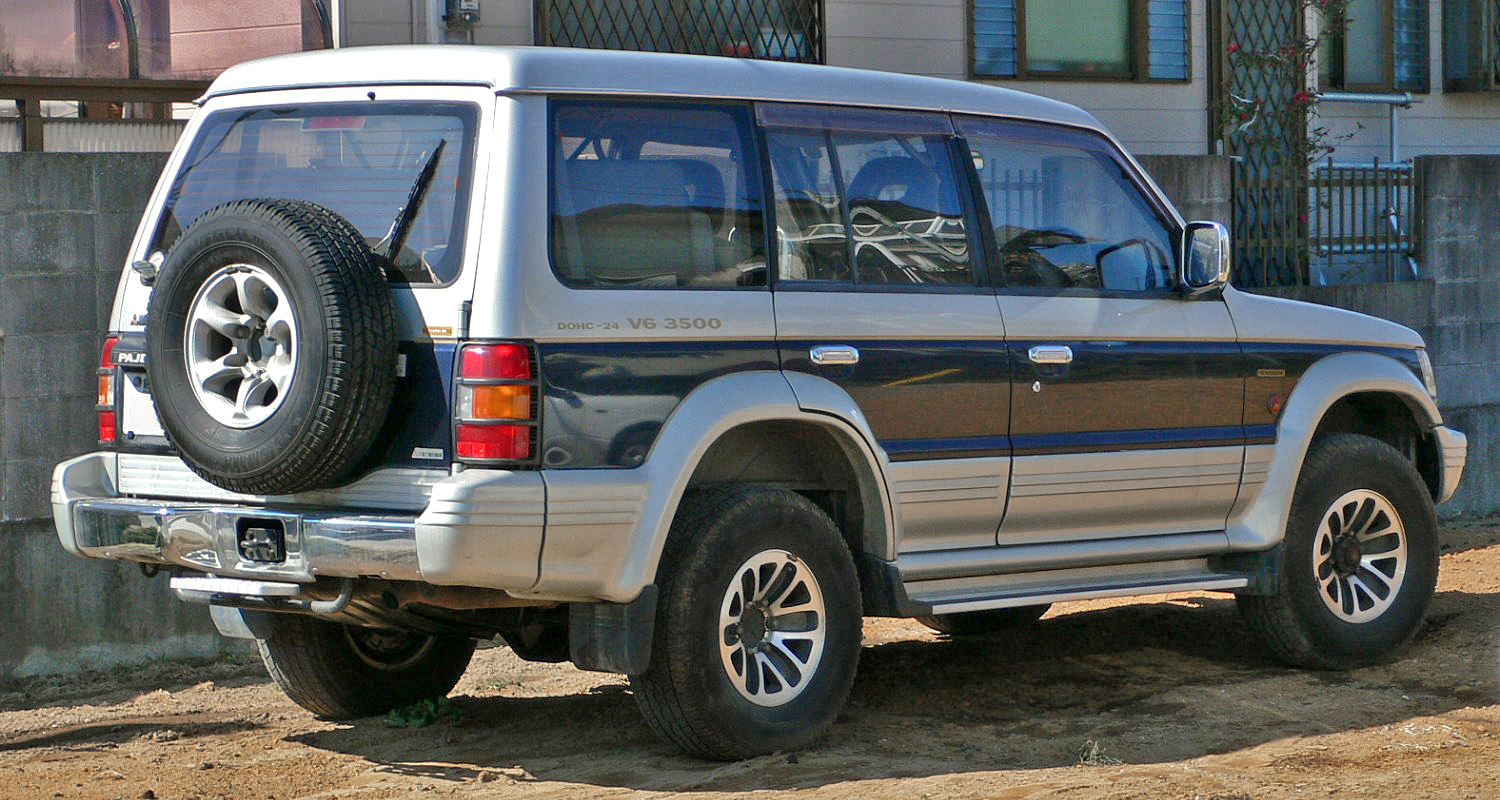
Pre-facelift Pajero GLS 5-door

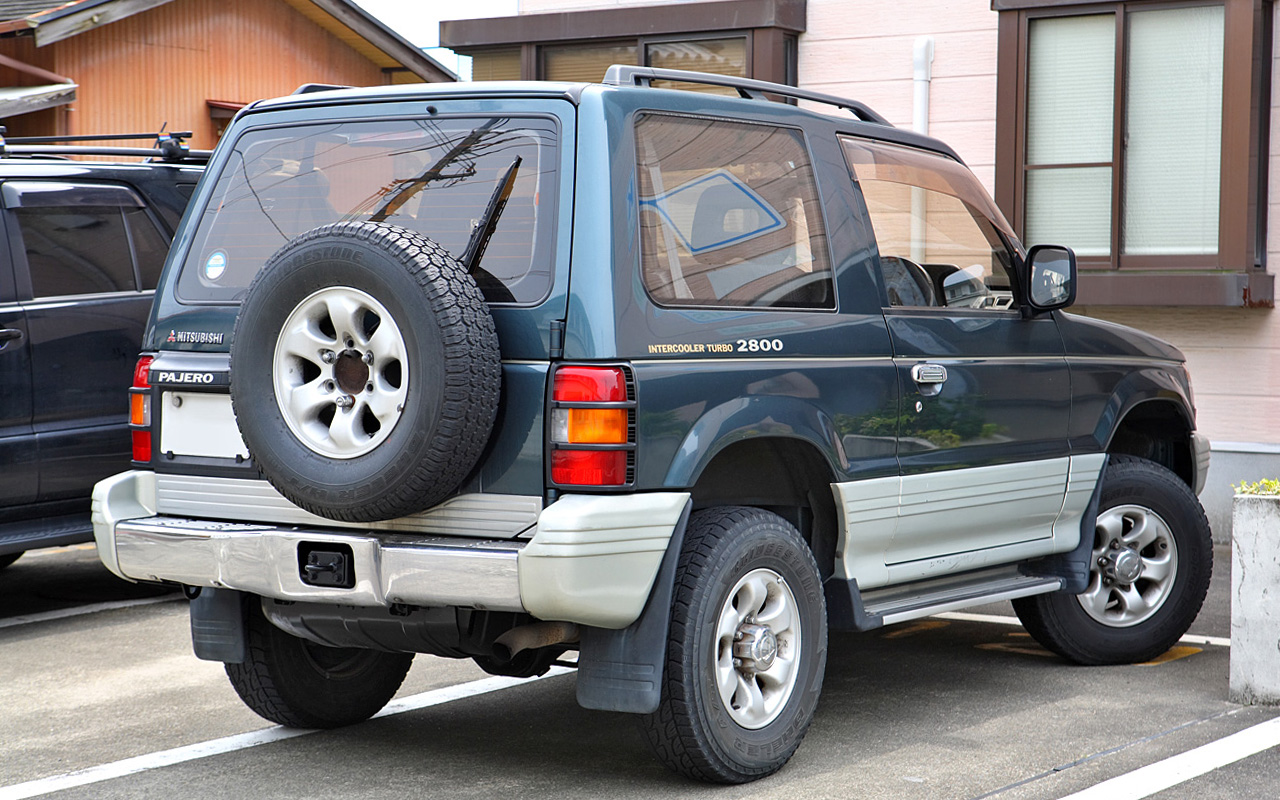
Pre-facelift Pajero GLS 3-door

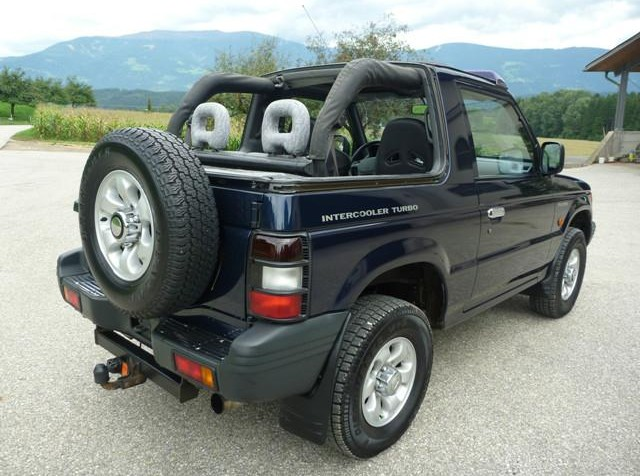
Pajero J-top

1994 Pajero Exceed interior

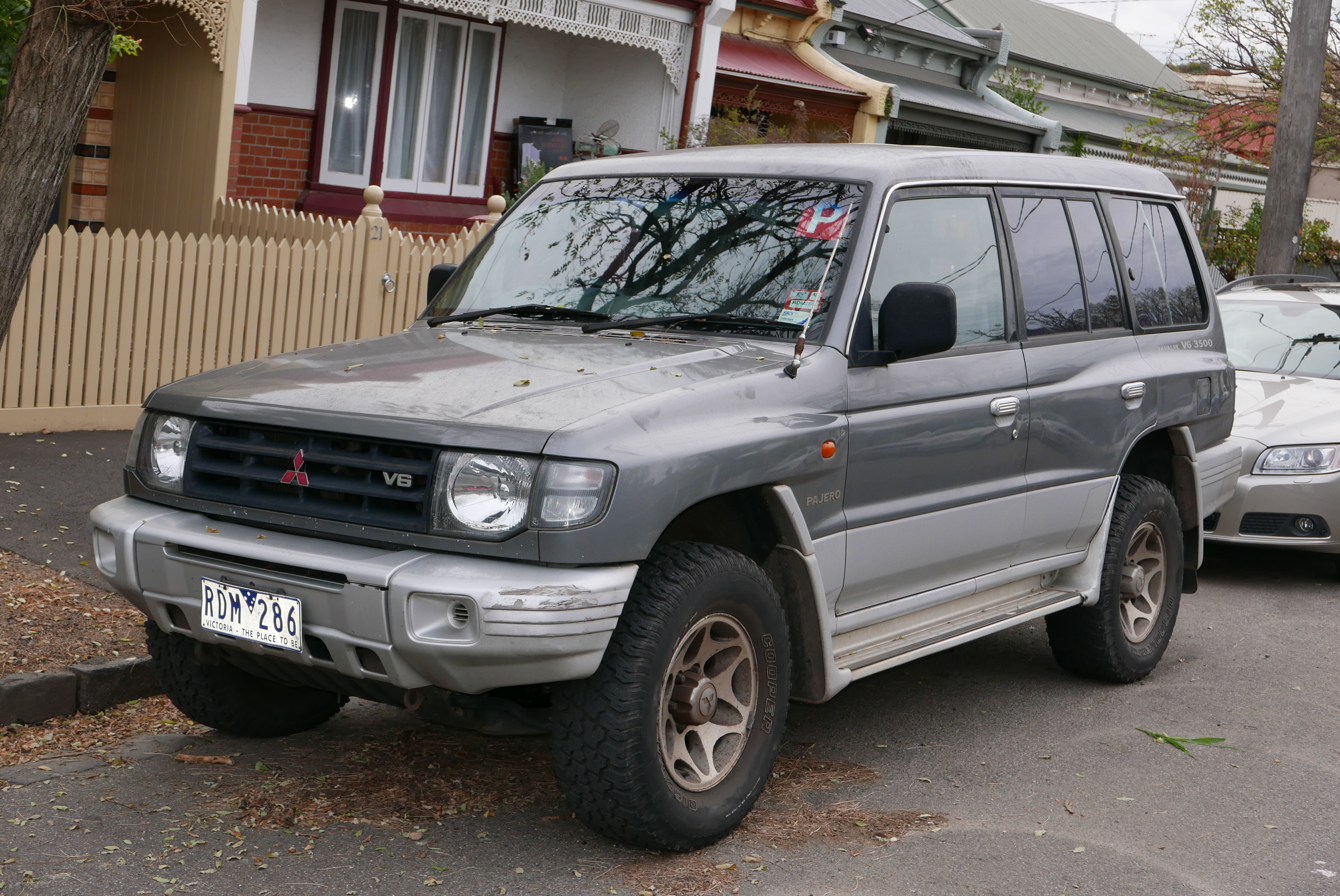
1998 Facelift Pajero GLS 5-door

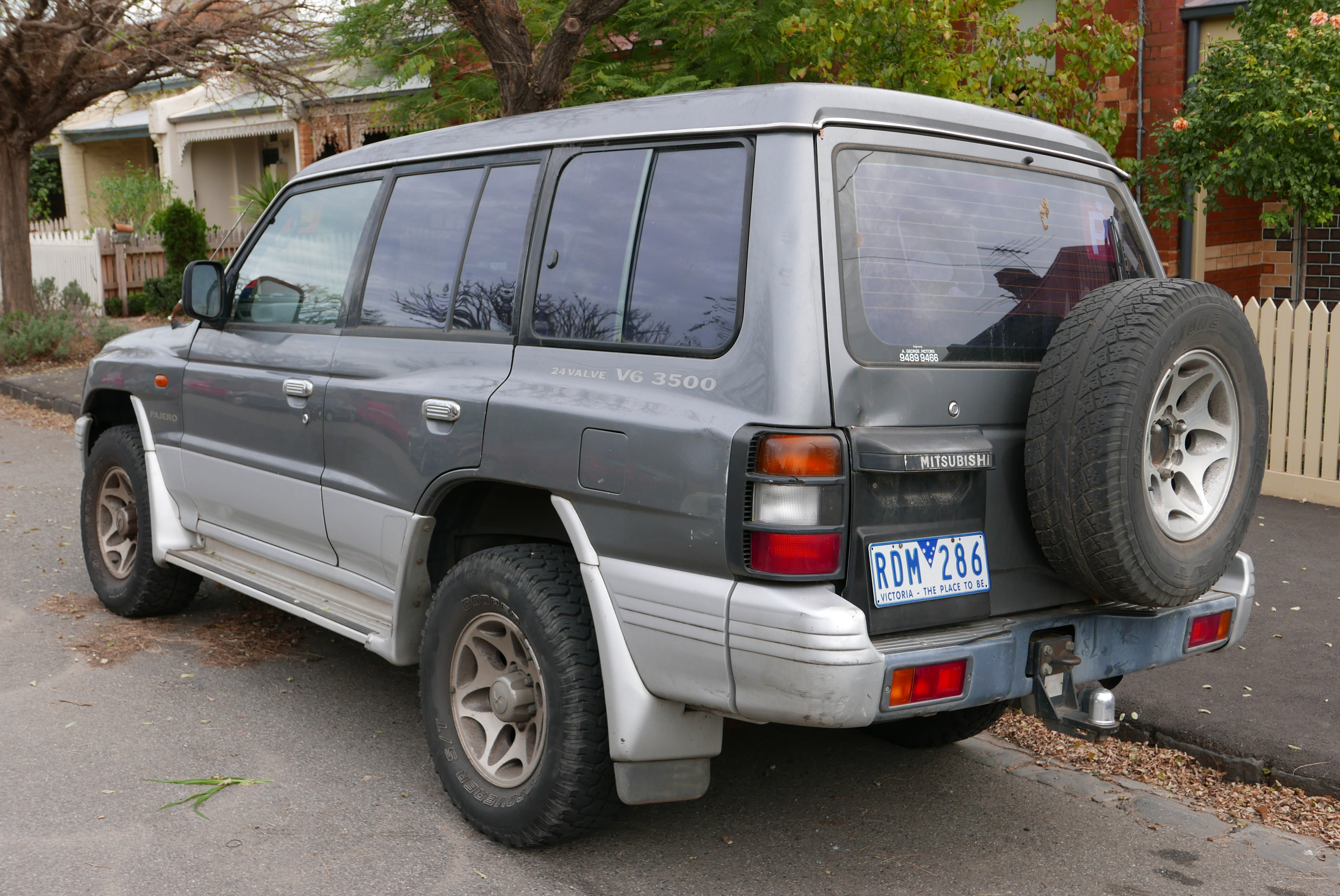
Rear view (facelift)

=== Pajero Evolution ===
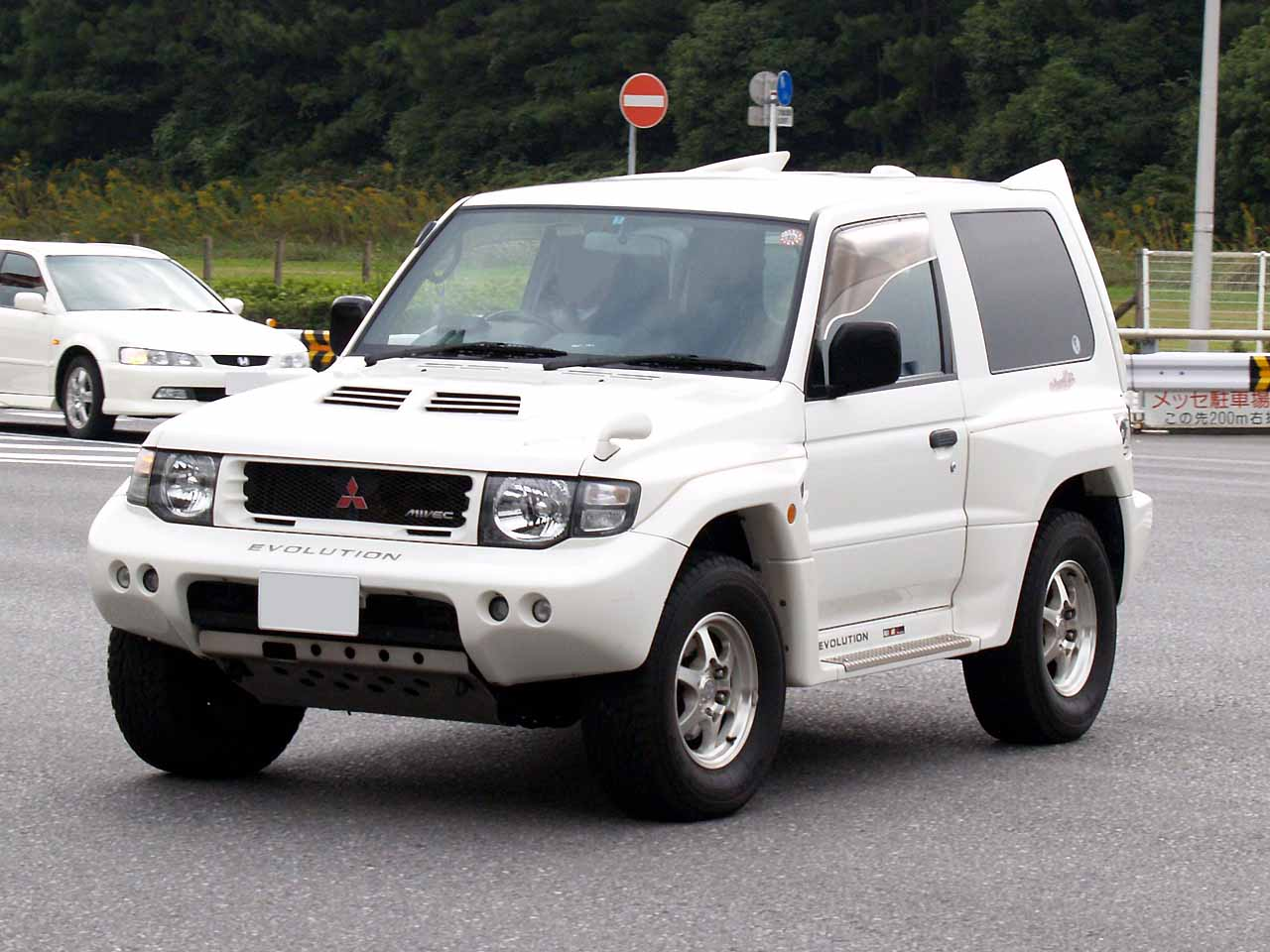
1998 Mitsubishi Pajero Evolution

The Pajero Evolution (V55) was introduced in October 1997, which was developed in specifically to meet homologation requirements for the Paris – Dakar Rally's T2 Class, which a minimum volume of production vehicles to be produced on which the rally car would be based on. The Pajero Evolution was designed from the ground up as a dedicated rally vehicle. It came standard with a 3.5-litre 24-valve DOHC V6 with Mitsubishi Innovative Valve Timing and Electronic Lift Control (MIVEC). A new, dual plenum variable intake helped increase power and a new, long-travel independent rear suspension made the ride even smoother. This fully independent suspension design set the underpinnings for what would be implemented in the third generation Pajero.

=== Foreign production ===
==== Asia ====
This model Pajero remained in production in India until 2012 as the Pajero SFX; the latest generation was sold as the Montero. It was also produced in Colombia from Complete Knock Down parts (CKD) until 2012, with a 2.4l 16 valve SOHC (130 PS) or 3.0l 12 valve V6 (148 PS), both engines were available in the three-door hard top, whereas the five-door wagon were only available with the 3.0-litre V6.

In the Philippines, MMPC introduced it in 1995 as the Pajero Fieldmaster. There were 2 engines available; the 2.5L 4D56 TD inline-four engine or the bigger 2.8L 4M40 diesel engine both paired to a standard 5-speed manual or Mitsubishi's 5-speed automatic transmission with part-time or full-time 4WD system (a 4x2 variant was also available). It featured keyless entry, leather upholstery, rear air vents, central locking, roof rails, 2DIN 6CD audio changer among other features. By 1999, Mitsubishi axed the "4x4" variant of the Pajero.

In 2003, the Pajero received minor upgrades including redesigned headlights, grille & taillights, new color options, new wheel designs, power adjustable seats, expandable sun visors & wood trim. It is still powered by the 2.8L SOHC engine mated to a 5-speed automatic transmission. Local production of the second-generation Pajeros in the Philippines ended in 2008.

In China, the second generation Pajero remains popular as it was involved in early joint ventures from the 1990s. Companies include Guangtong Motors, Jincheng Motors, Jinhui Motors, Sanjiu Motors, Sanxing Motors, Shanlu Motors and Wanli Motors.

Chinese car manufacturer Shanlu Motors made their version of the Pajero known as the CJY 6421D, which was produced from 1997 to 2001 and came standard with the 4G64 engine. Beijing Automobile Works followed suit and produced their version known as the BJ2032 Tornado from 2002 to 2004. The BJ2032 came standard with a 2.2-litre engine sourced from General Motors paired to a 5 speed manual gearbox. The Tornado is 4880 millimetres long, 1830 millimetres wide, 1800 millimetres high and utilizes a 2750 millimetre wheelbase.

===== Leopaard (Liebao) variants =====
The most well known rebadged variants of the Pajero sold in China were built by Changfeng Motor from 1995 to 2021. The first known model was produced from 2002 to 2014 and marketed under the Leopaard (Liebao) brand as the Liebao Heijinggang (猎豹奇兵-黑金刚 Leopaard Black King Kong) for the 2002 model year. The Heijinggang was available with four engines, the 2.2-litre 4RB3 based on the 2RZ-FE engine from Toyota, the 2.4-litre 4G64 engine and 6G72 V6 both from Mitsubishi and a 2.5-litre turbo diesel. All engines were paired to a 5-speed manual gearbox. The 4-speed automatic was only available on the 2002 Heijinggang with the V6 engine.

The sister model, known as the Liebao Qibing/6481, was produced from 2009 until 2014. The 2.2-litre 4RB3 was the only engine available paired to a 5-speed manual gearbox.

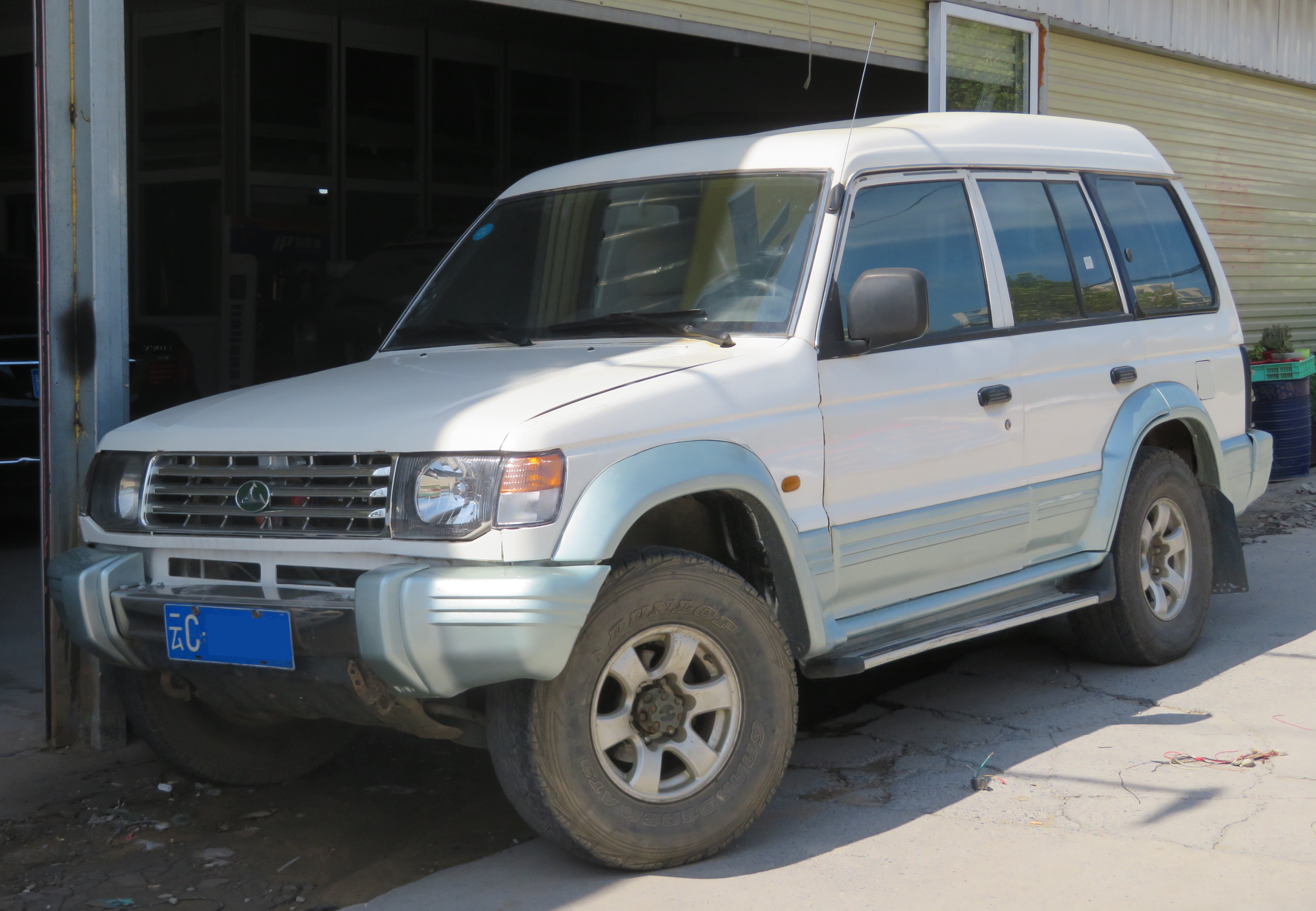
GAC Changfeng-Leopaard Pajero

Both models were replaced by a facelifted version called the Leopaard Q6 (Liebao Q6) in 2014 and remained in production until the bankruptcy of Changfeng Motors in July 2021. The Q6 used the 4G63 for 2015 and 2017 models paired to a 6-speed manual and automatic gearbox. The 2TZ-FE engine from Toyota was also available alongside it paired to a 5-speed manual gearbox. For 2019 onwards, the Q6 currently uses the 4G64 like its predecessors and uses a 5-speed manual gearbox. Two colours choices known as: Wild Green and Glacier White are available as standard. This version is rebadged and sold as the Pyeonghwa Ppeokkugi 2417 in North Korea.

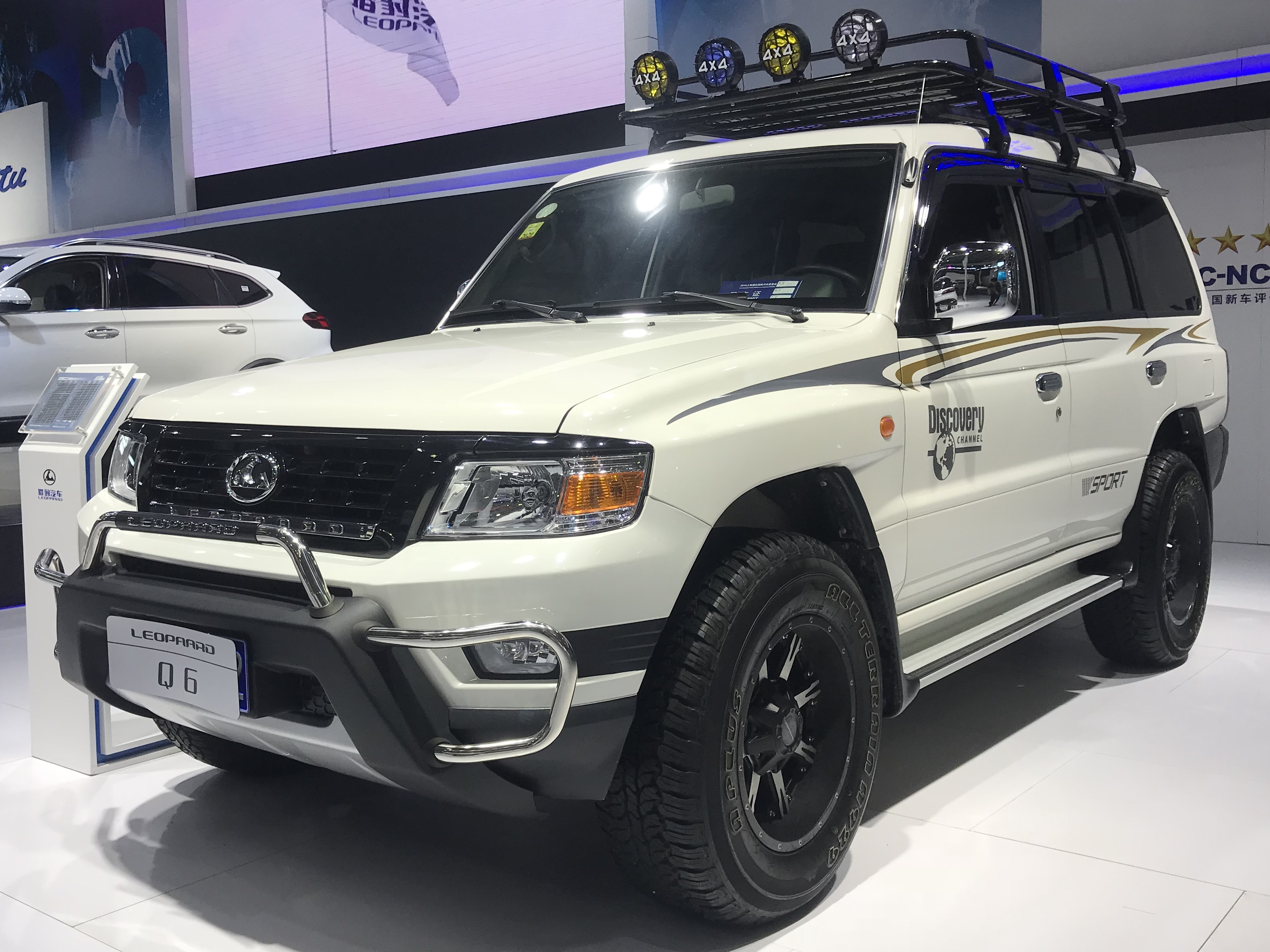
2019 Leopaard Q6

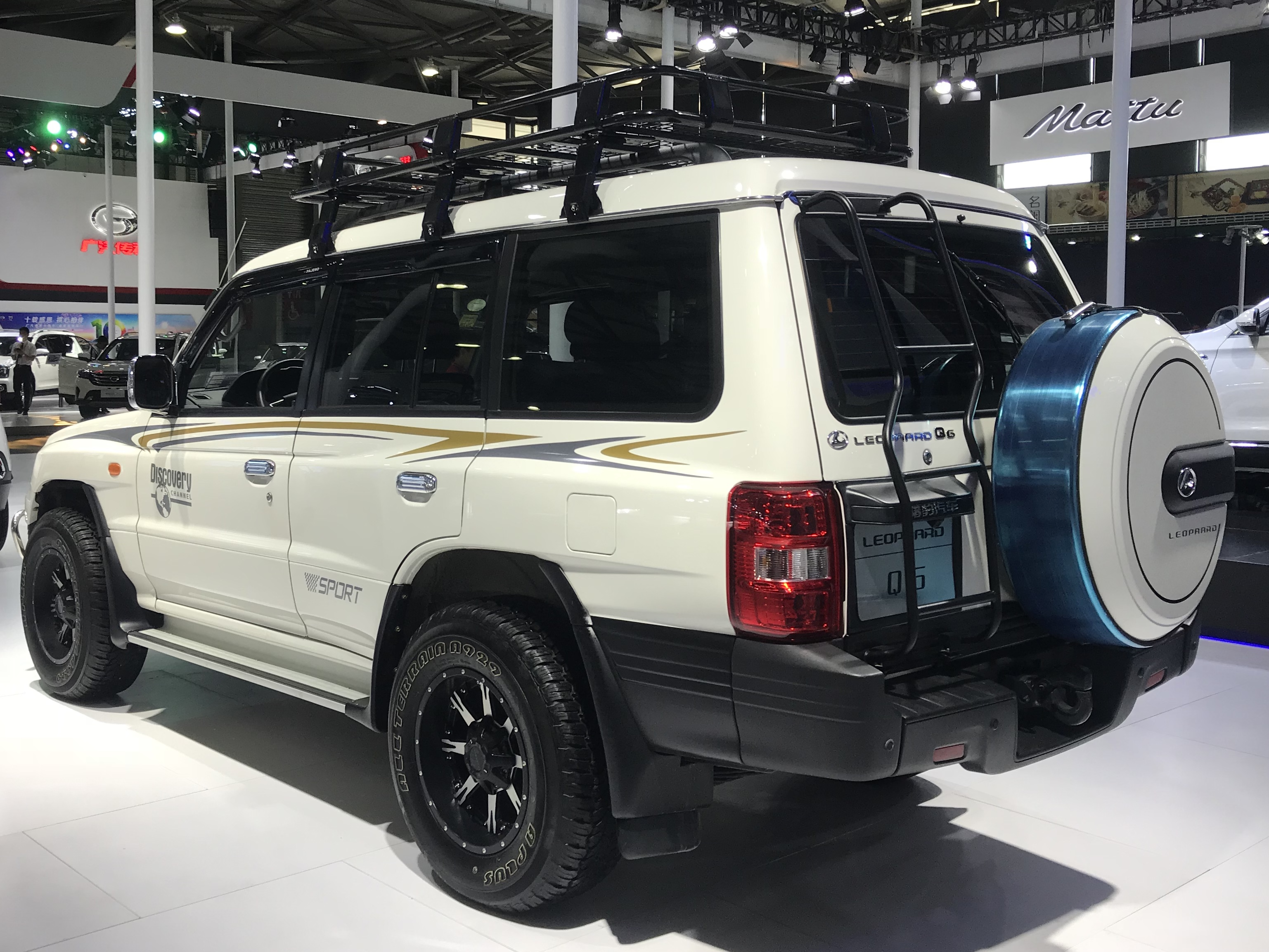
Rear view

==== South America ====
In Venezuela, the second generation was manufactured from 1992 to 1995 under the name of Mitsubishi Montero. It was available in long and short wheelbase. From 1996 to 2009 its name was changed to Mitsubishi Montero Dakar, it was only available in short wheel base with the 6G72 engine and a manual five-speed transmission.

The second generation Pajero was discontinued in 1999 (with the exceptions mentioned under Production), and replaced by the third generation Pajero. After ending production, the second generation Pajero gained unwanted attention in 2002 when TLC member Lisa “Left Eye” Lopes was killed in a car crash involving a second generation Mitsubishi Pajero, on a highway in La Ceiba, Honduras. She was the only fatality in the crash.

== Third generation (V60, V70; 1999) ==
Third generation
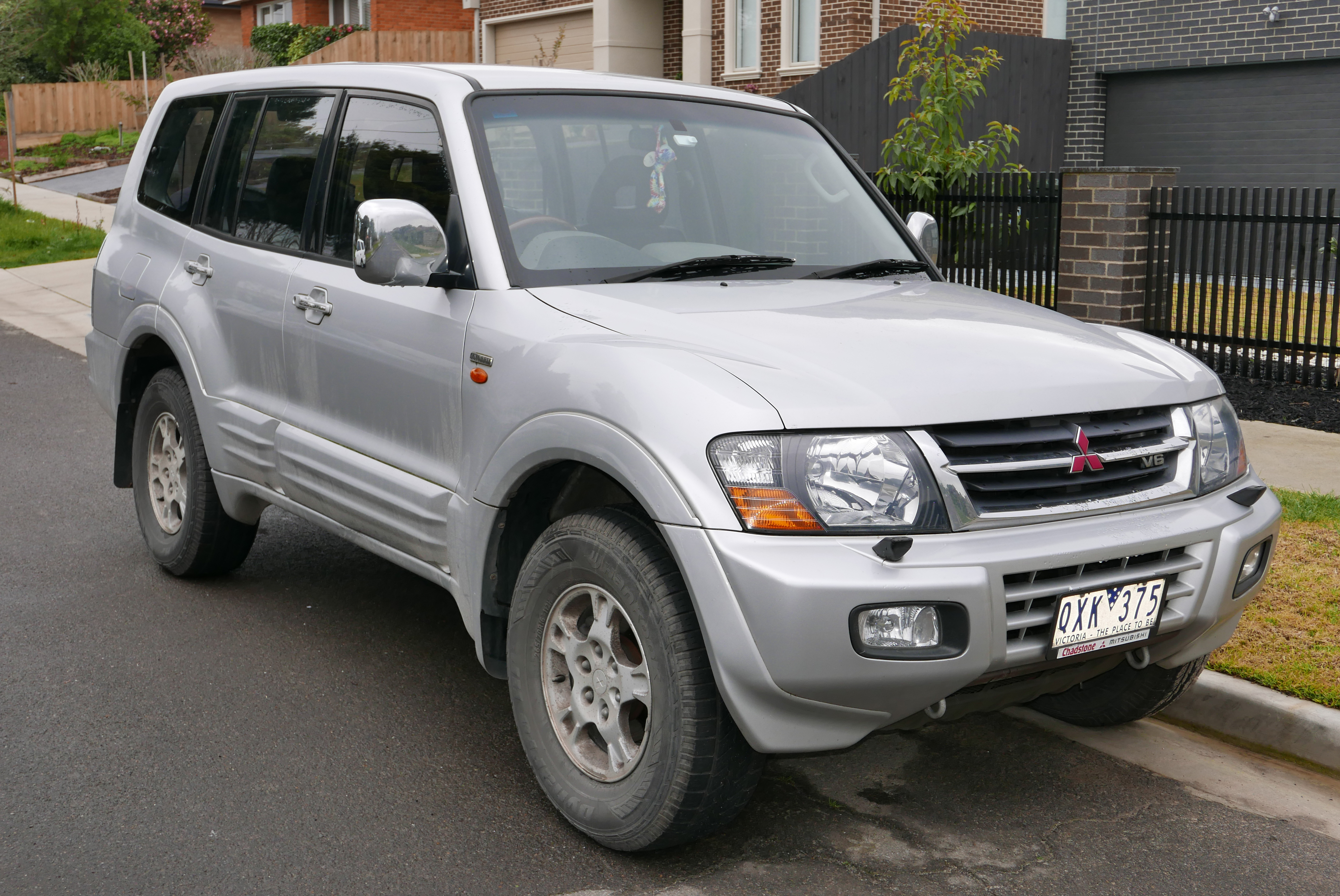
- Pre-facelift Pajero Exceed 5-door

Overview
- Also called: Mitsubishi Montero; Mitsubishi Shogun
- Production: August 1999 – 2006; 2004–2011 (China)
- Assembly: Japan: Sakahogi, Gifu (Pajero Manufacturing Co., Ltd.); China: Changsha, Hunan (GAC Changfeng Motor/GAC Mitsubishi)

Body and chassis
- Body style: 3-door SUV; 5-door SUV

Powertrain
- Engine: Petrol: 3.0 L 6G72 V6; 3.5 L 6G74 V6; 3.5 L 6G74 GDI V6; 3.8 L 6G75 V6; Diesel: 2.5 L 4D56 turbo I4; 2.8 L 4M40 turbo I4; 3.2 L 4M41 DI-D turbo I4
- Transmission: 5-speed manual 4-speed automatic 5-speed automatic

Dimensions
- Wheelbase: 3-door: 2,545 mm (100.2 in); 5-door: 2,780 mm (109.45 in)
- Length: 3-door: 4,219 mm (166.1 in); 2001–02 5-door: 4,798 mm (188.9 in); 2003–06 5-door: 4,831 mm (190.2 in)
- Width: 3-door: 1,875 mm (73.8 in); 2001–02 5-door: 1,877 mm (73.9 in); 2003–06 5-door: 1,900 mm (74.8 in)
- Height: 3-door: 1,844 mm (72.6 in); 2001–02 5-door: 1,857 mm (73.1 in); 2003–04 5-door: 1,816 mm (71.5 in); 2005–06 5-door: 1,885 mm (74.2 in)
- Curb weight: 5-door: 2,060 kg (4,542 lb)

Designed in house, the third generation Pajero debuted in the Japanese domestic market in 1999, in other markets in late 2000 as a 2001 model, and in the Philippines and other developing nations in 2003.

The third generation was redesigned with a lower, wider stance and unibody (monocoque) construction with integrated ladder frame chassis for increased torsional rigidity and improved cabin strength when compared to typical body-on-frame (ladder frame) designs. This was in part due to Mitsubishi's RISE reinforcement system, which resulted in a chassis and body combination that exhibited impressive structural integrity in rollover accidents and was completely unaffected by severe chassis loading as would typically experienced during off-road recoveries. The fuel tank was relocated between the front and rear axles to improve weight distribution and improve ground clearance. This generation featured a fold and tumble, reclining second row 60/40 split seat and a stowable / removable third row seat.

The Super Select 4 (SS4) system was also further refined: bevel gears were replaced with planetary gears. This meant the front-to-rear torque setting ranged from 33:67, with the ability to adjust to 50:50 depending on surface conditions. The system was also made fully electronic, meaning the vehicle didn't have to be in gear to switch between drive modes. After all the upgrades, the system was renamed to Super Select 4WD II (SS4-II).

Alongside rack and pinion steering (as opposed to the recirculating ball system on previous generations), the Pajero also offered a choice of three transmissions; a five speed manual, a four speed INVECS-II automatic and a five speed INVECS-II tiptronic.

An all-new 3.8 litre SOHC 24-valve V6 powerplant was also introduced on this generation. This engine used an Electronic Throttle Valve (ETV).

The third generation was introduced on 2 August 1999 and was scheduled to be replaced by the Autumn of 2006. It received a minor facelift in 2003. The 3.0 L engine's power was increased to 130 kW (177 PS; 174 hp), and the 3.5 L engine was given petrol direct injection, increasing power to 162 kW (220 PS; 217 hp) in the Japanese market (export versions kept the standard EFI engine), now with 149 kW (203 PS; 200 hp). The 2.8 L Diesel was retained only for developing markets, and was replaced by a new 16-valve direct injection engine, with 3.2 L and 120 kW (163 PS; 161 hp). For efficiency, diesel versions saw the intercooler moved to a front-mounted position as opposed to the previous top-mounted position.

In the North American market, the 3.5 L engine was replaced for 2003 by a more powerful 3.8 L unit, with 160 kW (218 PS; 215 hp). This engine was later made available to export markets such as South America, Australia and New Zealand, whilst it replaced the GDI V6 in the Japanese lineup in 2005. The short wheelbase model was not marketed in North America, where the Montero was the only SUV in Mitsubishi's lineup with standard four-wheel drive as opposed to all-wheel-drive. The Montero was discontinued in the US market after the 2006 model year.

This generation Pajero was released for the Chinese market in 2004 and continued production until 2011. Engine choices consisted of the 3- and 3.8-litre V6s, which were paired with the 5-speed manual and 4-speed automatic gearbox for the smaller units and only a 5-speed automatic available on the larger engine. The trim levels were known as GL, GLS and GLX.

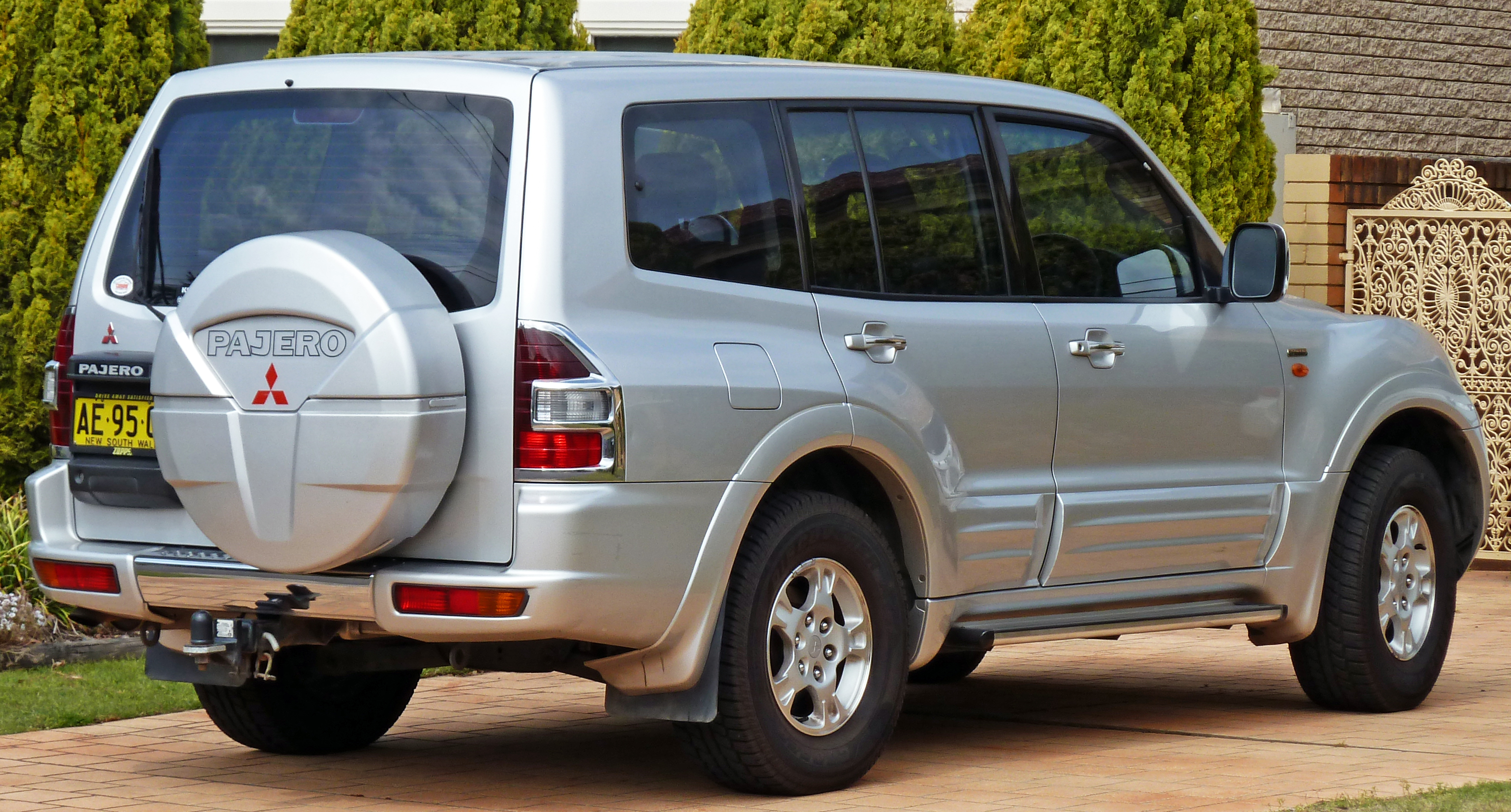
Rear view (pre-facelift)

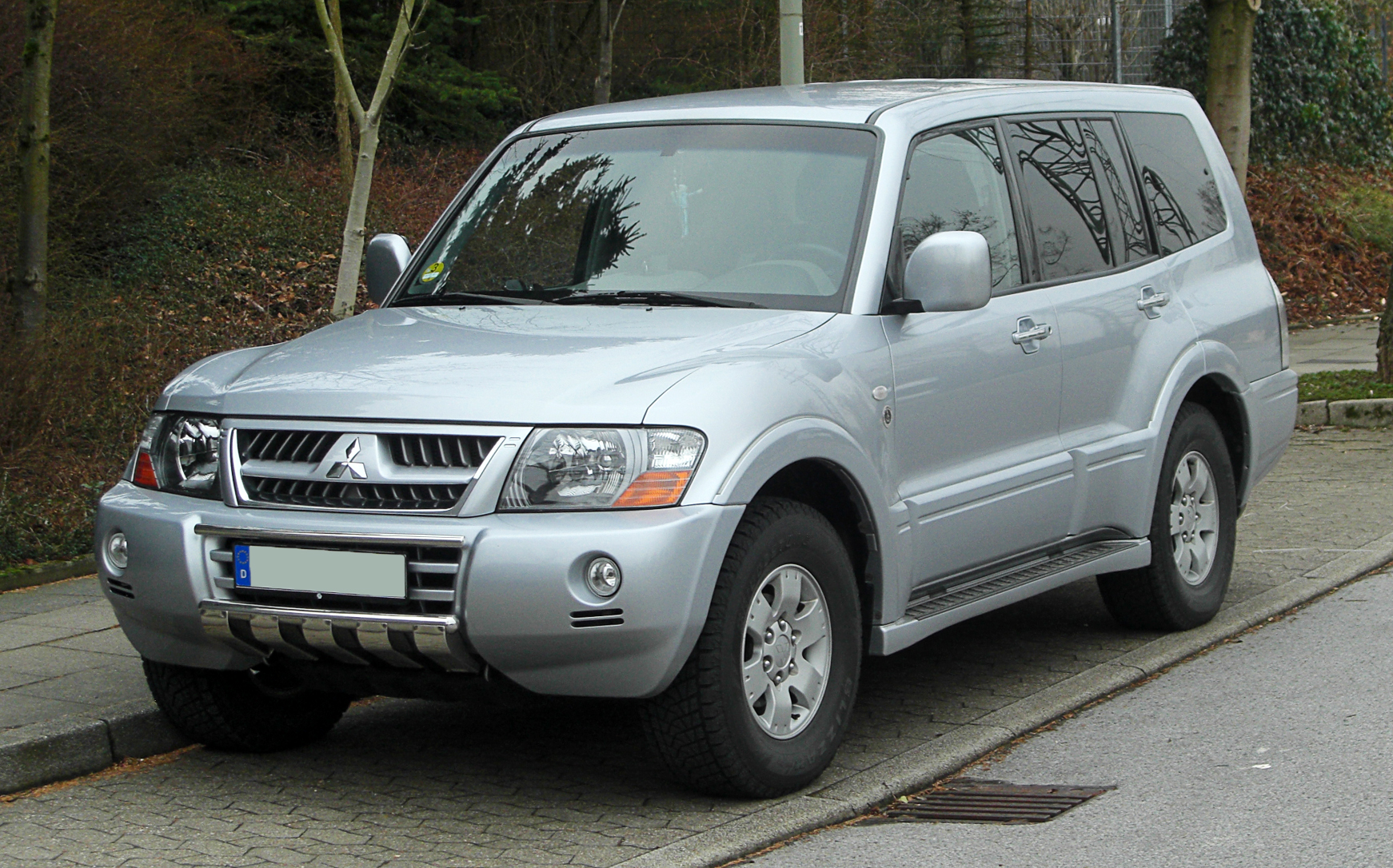
Mitsubishi Pajero 3.2 DI-D (facelift)

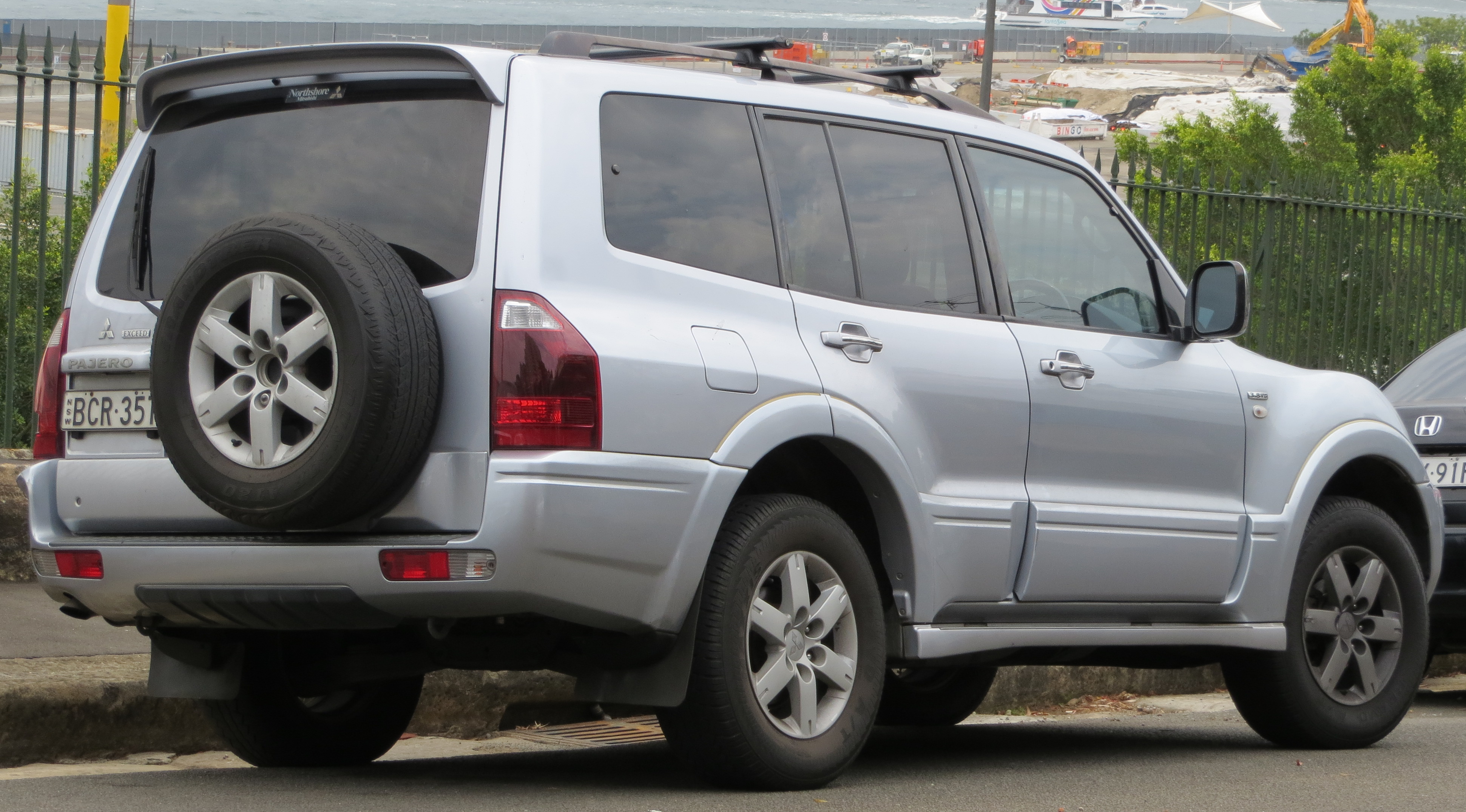
Rear view (5-door; facelift)

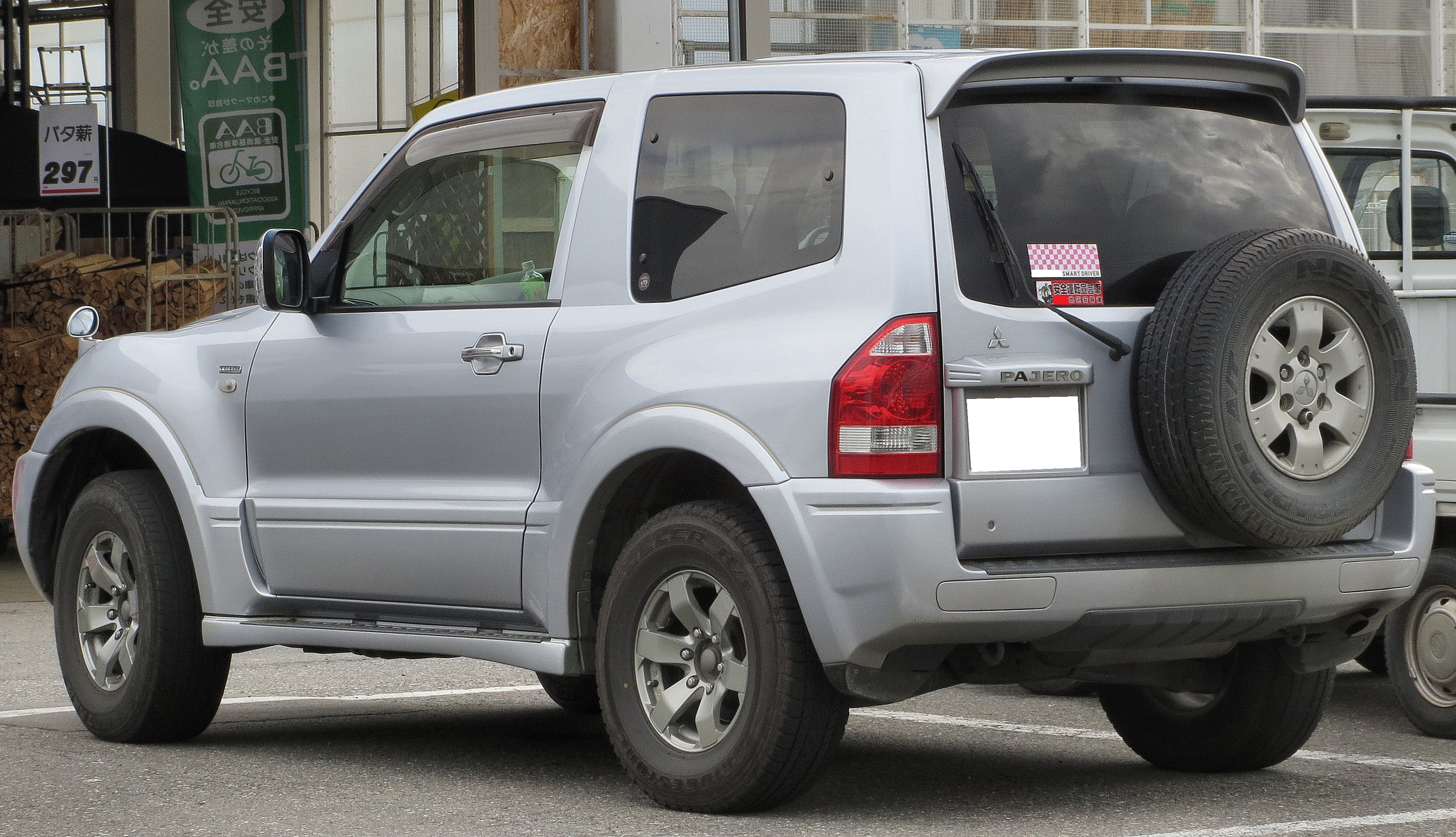
Mitsubishi Pajero Exceed 3200 (3-door; facelift)

=== Safety ===
ANCAP test results* Mitsubishi Pajero Exceed (2004)
Test	Score
Overall	4 /5 stars
Frontal offset	9.88/16
Side impact	16/16
Pole	0/2
Seat belt reminders	0/3
Whiplash protection	Not Assessed
Pedestrian protection	Not Assessed
Electronic stability control	Standard

The 3rd generation Pajero performed acceptably (for 2004 standards) in the frontal offset crash test, conducted by the IIHS (an NCAP testing partner). The cabin structure retained its shape very well with the cabin showing virtually no deformation. All doors were able to be opened with only moderate effort. The Pajero received 9.88 out of the possible 16.00 points for this test. Protection for the driver's chest received the highest rating, while head protection was one step down, considered 'acceptable' as the steering wheel moved upwards too much, causing the dummy's head to contact the steering wheel and the B-pillar on rebound. The steering column, though releasing from its mounts during the crash, produced a source of injury for the driver's legs and the passenger's knees impacted the glove box. Upper legs of the driver and passenger also showed some stresses while the lower leg was impacted by the clutch pedal for the driver.

The barrier side impact protection (intended to replicate a side-on impact by a vehicle) was not assessed as the seat heights were far higher than the impact height would have been and as such were not regulated to be tested for under ANCAP regulations at the time. However, ANCAP awarded the Pajero 16.00 points for this section noting that vehicles of similar design and size have faired similarly well in these types of crashes. While it was awarded full marks for this section, no test has been carried out so real-world performance may be significantly varied.

Though optional, side pole impact testing was carried out and can be considered a 'worst case' side impact. The 3rd Generation Pajero has side thorax airbags on Exceed models (optional on others), but does not have curtain airbags, and as a result performed poorly in this test receiving 0.00 points for head protection.

Pedestrian impact was not tested and as such the Pajero was awarded no points for this portion of the test.

Head restraints were considered poor in protecting against whiplash.

== Fourth generation (V80, V90; 2006) ==
Fourth generation
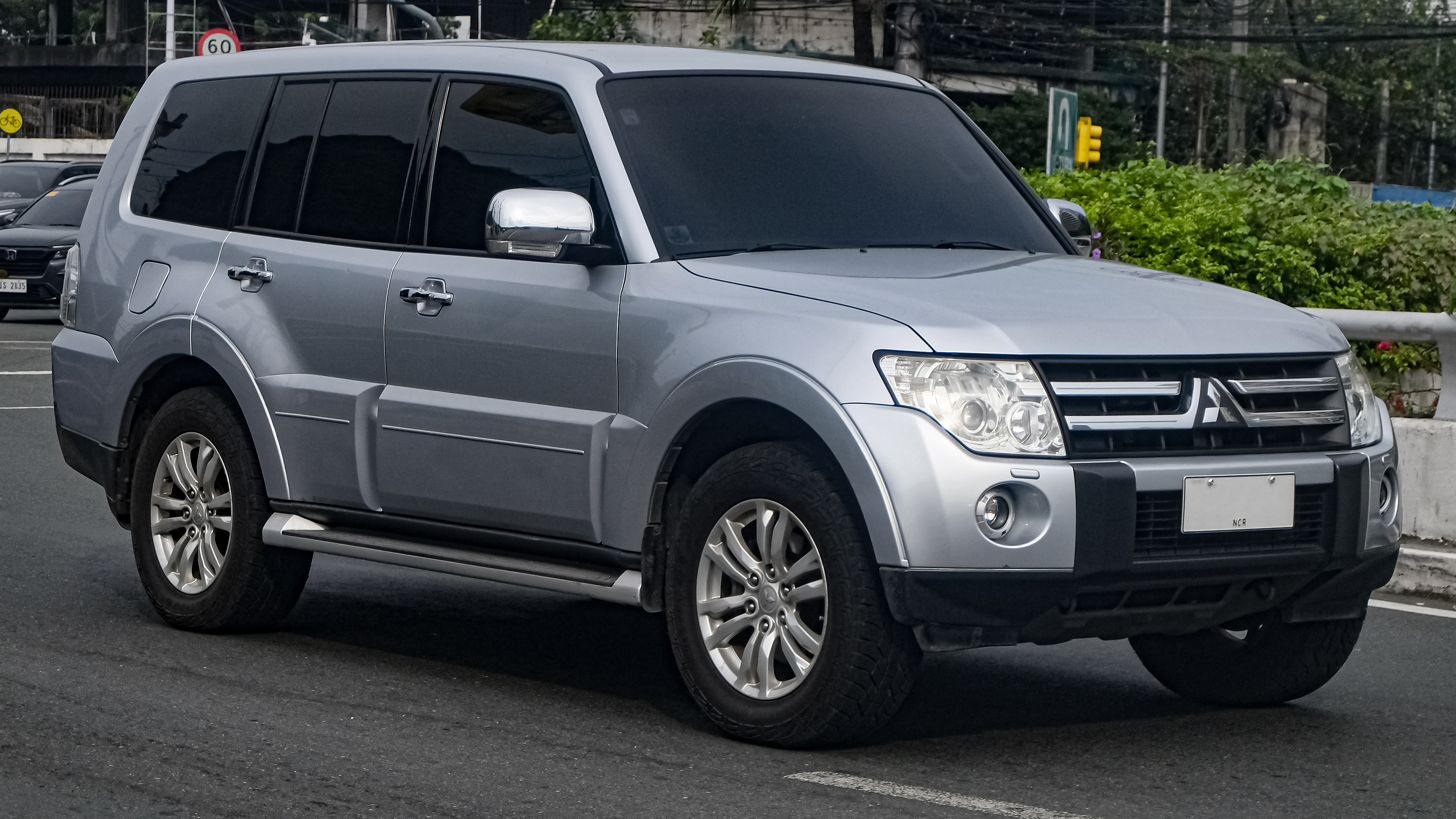
- Mitsubishi Pajero GLS (pre-facelift)

Overview
- Also called: Mitsubishi Montero; Mitsubishi Shogun
- Production: September 2006 – March 2021
- Assembly: Japan: Sakahogi, Gifu (Pajero Manufacturing Co., Ltd.)

Body and chassis
- Body style: 3-door SUV (2006–2018); 5-door SUV

Powertrain
- Engine: Petrol: 2.4 L 4G64 I4 (China); 3.0 L 6G72 V6; 3.0 L 6B31 V6 (China); 3.5 L 6G74 V6; 3.8 L 6G75 MIVEC V6; Diesel: 2.8 L 4M40 turbo I4; 3.2 L 4M41 DI-D turbo I4
- Power output: 131 kW (176 hp; 178 PS) (6G72); 183–185 kW (245–248 hp; 249–252 PS) (6G75 MIVEC); 140 kW (188 hp; 190 PS) (4M41)
- Transmission: 5-speed manual 4-speed automatic 5-speed automatic V5A51; 5-speed automatic V5AFW (A750F)

Dimensions
- Wheelbase: 5-door: 2,780 mm (109.4 in); 3-door: 2,545 mm (100.2 in)
- Length: 5-door: 4,900 mm (192.9 in); 3-door: 4,385 mm (172.6 in)
- Width: 2007–2009: 1,895 mm (74.6 in); 2010–2021: 1,875 mm (73.8 in)
- Height: 2007–2009 5-door: 1,900 mm (74.8 in); 2007–2009 3-door: 1,880 mm (74.0 in); 2010–2021 5-door: 1,890 mm (74.4 in); 2010–2021 3-door: 1,840 mm (72.4 in)
- Curb weight: 5-door: 2,110–2,165 kg (4,652–4,773 lb)

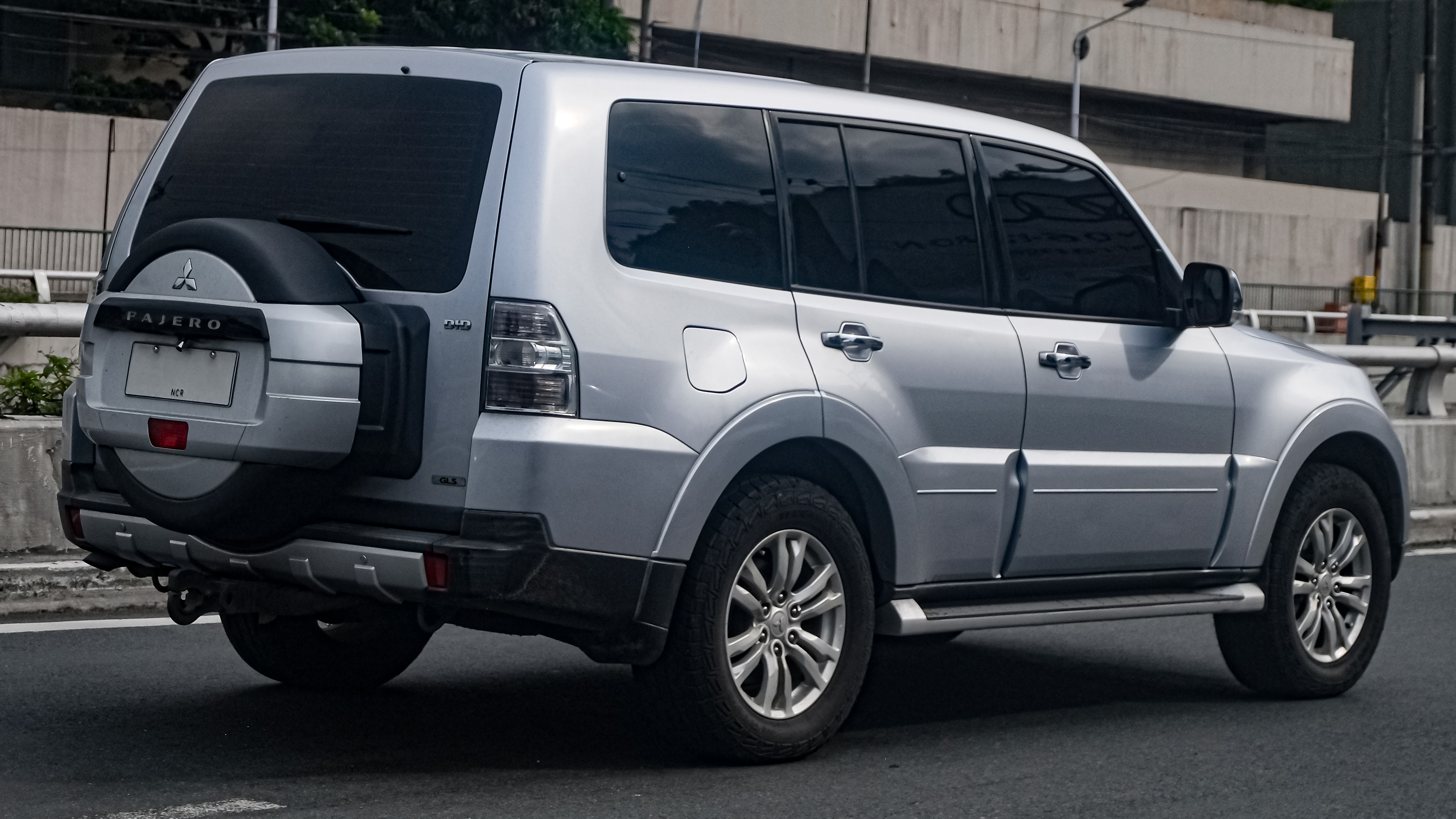
Mitsubishi Pajero GLS rear (pre-facelift)

The fourth generation debuted at the Paris Motor Show on 30 September 2006 with the series code "NS". It revised interior and exterior styling, dual-stage front airbags, as well as new side-impact and curtain airbags. The chassis was a slightly revised monocoque with Mitsubishi's RISE technology as featured in the previous generation.

The Super-Select 4WD II system was retained, with an improved Active Stability & Traction Control (ASTC) system and electronic brakeforce distribution with 220 millimetres (8.7 in) of ground clearance and a 700mm wading depth — as well as more extensive skid plating, a carbon-fibre-wrapped rear driveshaft and aluminium bonnet to reduce weight. All models feature a dedicated space and mounting points behind the main battery for the addition of a second battery for harsh winter environments and electric winch usage. The fourth generation retained the fully-independent suspension as the previous generation, with revisions to the rear axle assembly for strength and reliability off-road as well as 17-inch alloy wheels on GLS trim. Brakes were upgraded to larger 332mm front rotors on LWB versions. SWB versions retained the 289mm rotors from the previous generation until later in production. Exceed models featured additional rear air-conditioning with its own rear-mounted compressor for independent control. All models up to and including NX were available with a choice of automatic or manual transmissions depending on the market, except in Exceed and Super Exceed where automatic was the only option.

Engines were upgraded with the 3.2 L diesel gaining Common Rail technology, a DPF for cleaner emissions and producing 125 kW (170 PS; 168 hp). The 3.8 L V6 gained MIVEC variable valve timing to boost power to 184 kW (250 PS; 247 hp) using the factory recommended 95 RON. Both engines met Euro IV emissions standards. The 3.0 L V6 was retained for the Japanese and GCC markets. In Indonesia, this model was only marketed in Super Exceed trim.

SWB models came standard with 5 seats with 7 seats in the LWB version. 5 seats were permanent with an additional folding 3rd row bench seat in the cargo bay that could swing out from a dedicated underfloor compartment and lock into place. All seats came with full 3-point retracting seatbelts including the cargo bay seats. The second row of seats featured a 60:40 split. This second row could have the seatbacks folded down, from there the seats could be tumbled forward independently from one another and lock in the folded and forward positions. In the forwardmost, stowed position, this offered a fully-flat cargo area. Storage capacity with the seats in their normal position is 849 L (VDA). With the seats folded and tumbled forward, the total storage volume increases to 1,790 L.

From 2009, a new series was introduced; "NT", the 3.0L V6 engine was dropped in the GCC markets, and was replaced by a 3.5L V6 engine, rated for 141 kW (192 PS; 189 hp) and 306 N⋅m (226 lb⋅ft) torque. Further revisions to the 3.2 L Turbo Diesel in the 2011 model year saw the power and torque increased to 147 kW (200 PS; 197 hp) and 441 N⋅m (325 lb⋅ft) respectively, through the addition of a variable geometry turbocharger, among other changes. Both engines met Euro V emissions standards. The 3.8 L petrol engine remained at 184 kW (250 PS; 247 hp) and 329 N⋅m (243 lb⋅ft) (using 95 RON fuel). There was also a panel van version available in markets, where such a model can be registered at a lower tax rate. Vehicles also received a rear locking differential as standard and towing capacity was increased to 3,000 kg braked with 180 kg of ball weight. In some markets, such as Ireland and Germany, the Pajero received an increased braked towing capacity of 3500 kg up to a 12% grade with a 150 kg ball weight. Backwards compatible with all models from 2007 onwards, it utilised a heavy-duty towbar from German manufacturer MVG GmbH that is only available through authorised Mitsubishi dealerships. The automatic transmission was also upgraded by way of the Aisin-Warner A750F (the same as is used in certain Toyota Tundra, Lexus LX 470 and other heavy-duty / full-size Toyota models) while using Mitsubishi's own INVECS-II transmission programming. Interiors were changed slightly, with upper plastic trim panels moving from a light grey, to a warm beige colour. In certain markets, a full beige interior was offered with beige seats and beige lower trim panels. Exceed models gained an 860 watt, 12-speaker, Rockford Acoustic Design sound system with 5.1 surround sound and a 10" DVC subwoofer.

For the 2010 model year, the Pajero gained a subwoofer in certain lower spec models as well as a new grille. In the Australian market, a 'Platinum' trim was offered with a reversing camera, fog lamps, a rear deflector and special badging and floor mats as well as Mitsubishi's Multi Communication System (MMCS) with satellite navigation and Bluetooth.

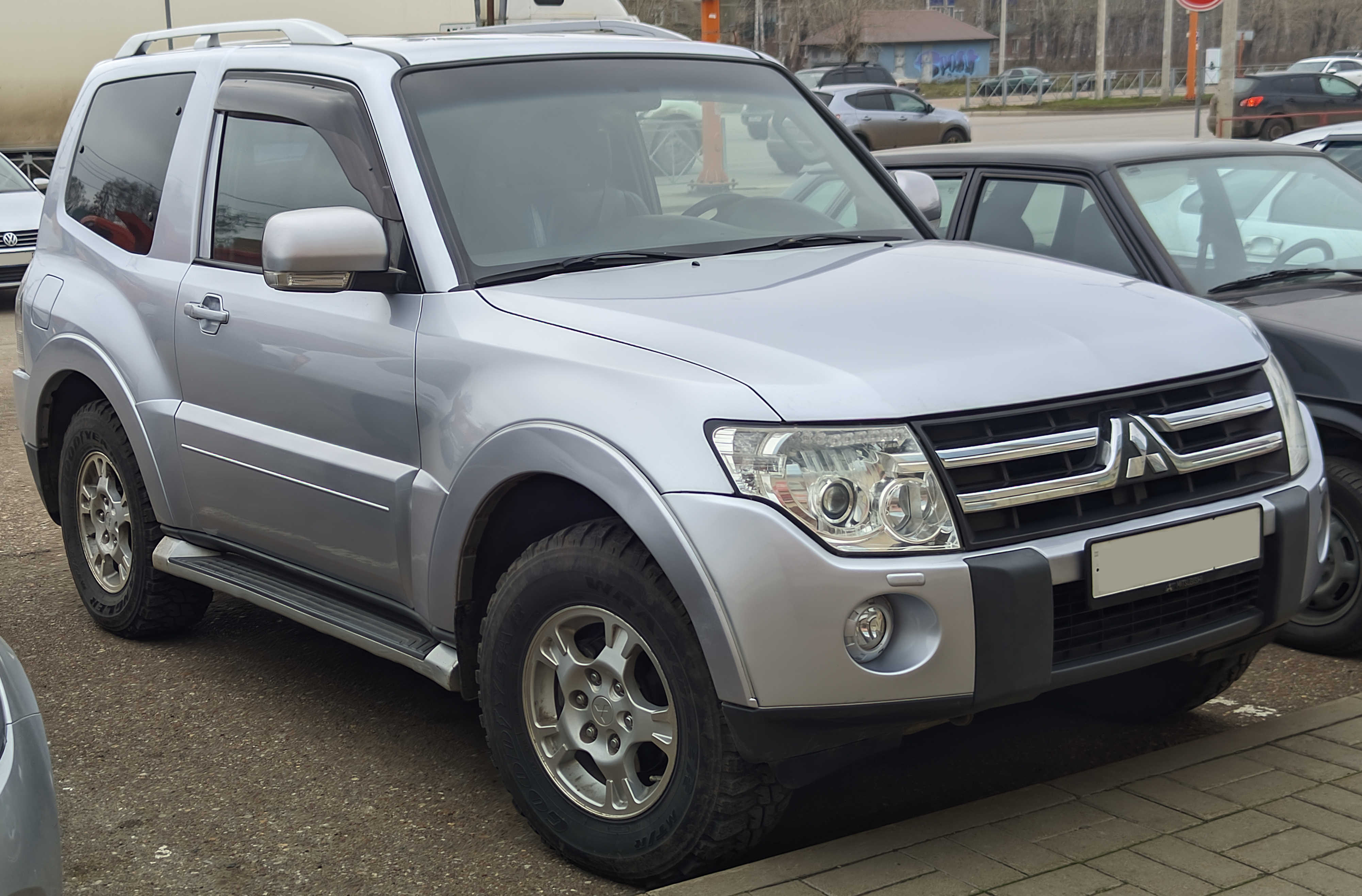
2007 Mitsubishi Pajero 3-door (pre-facelift)

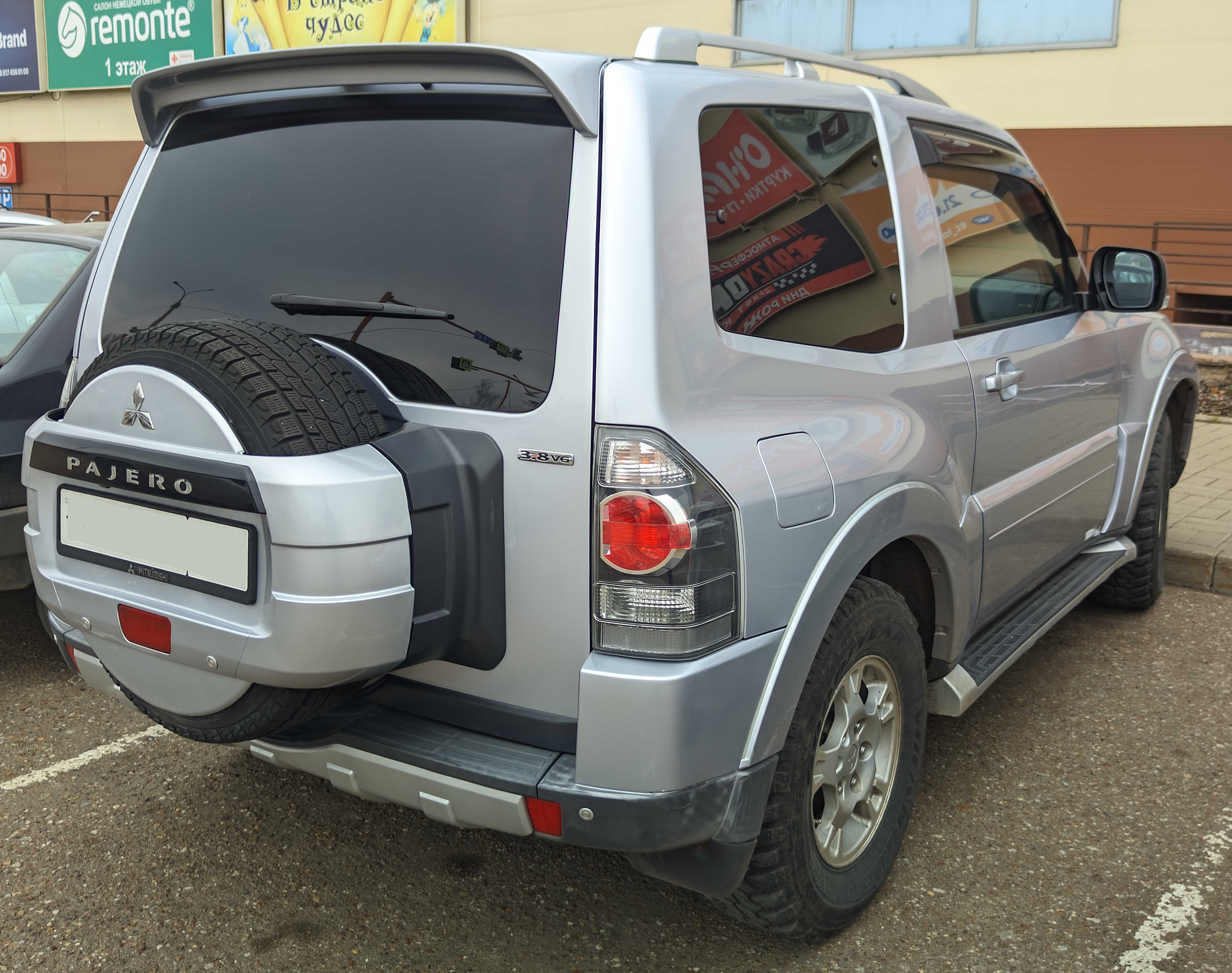
2007 Mitsubishi Pajero 3-door rear (pre-facelift)

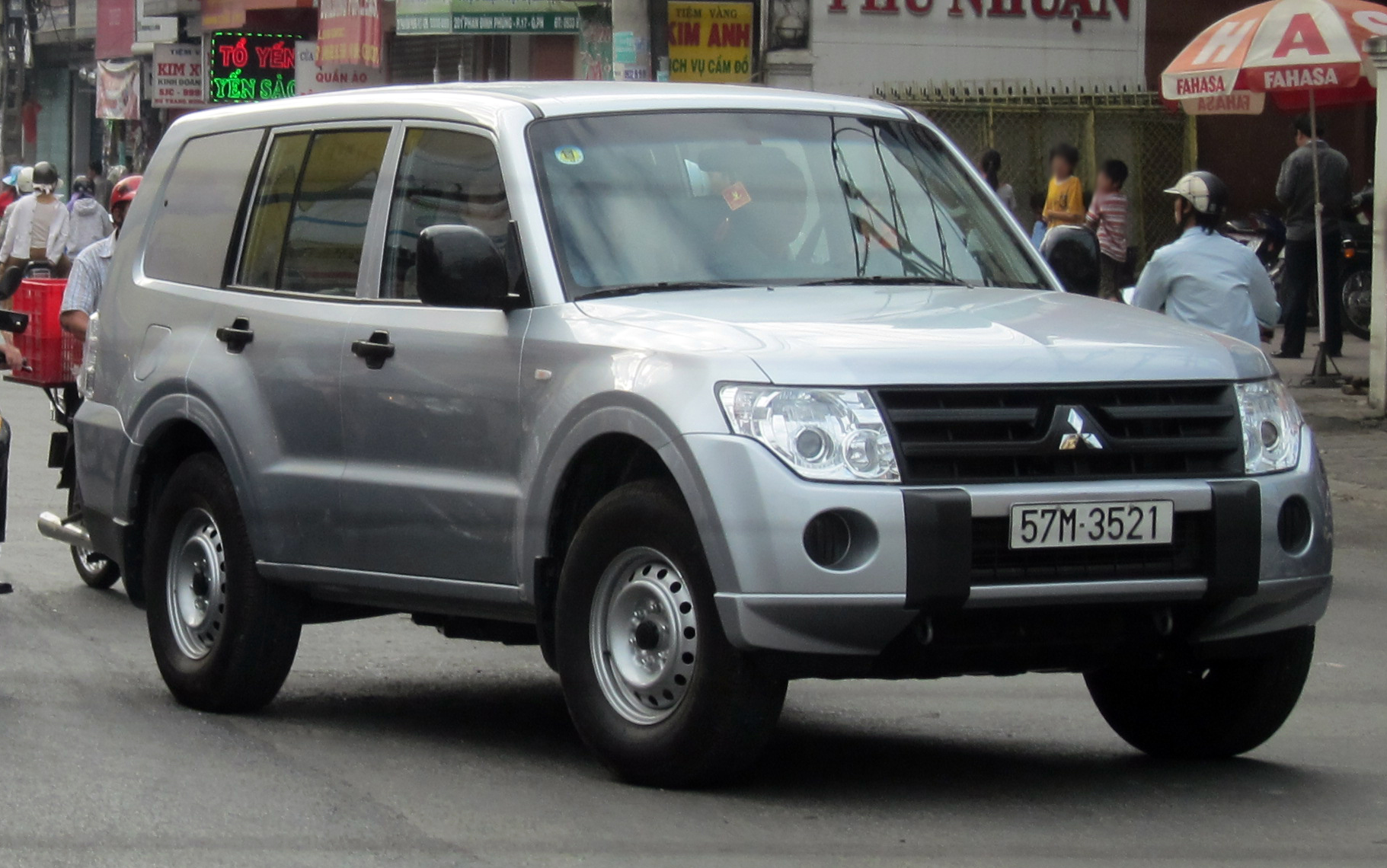
Mitsubishi Pajero Van (Vietnam)

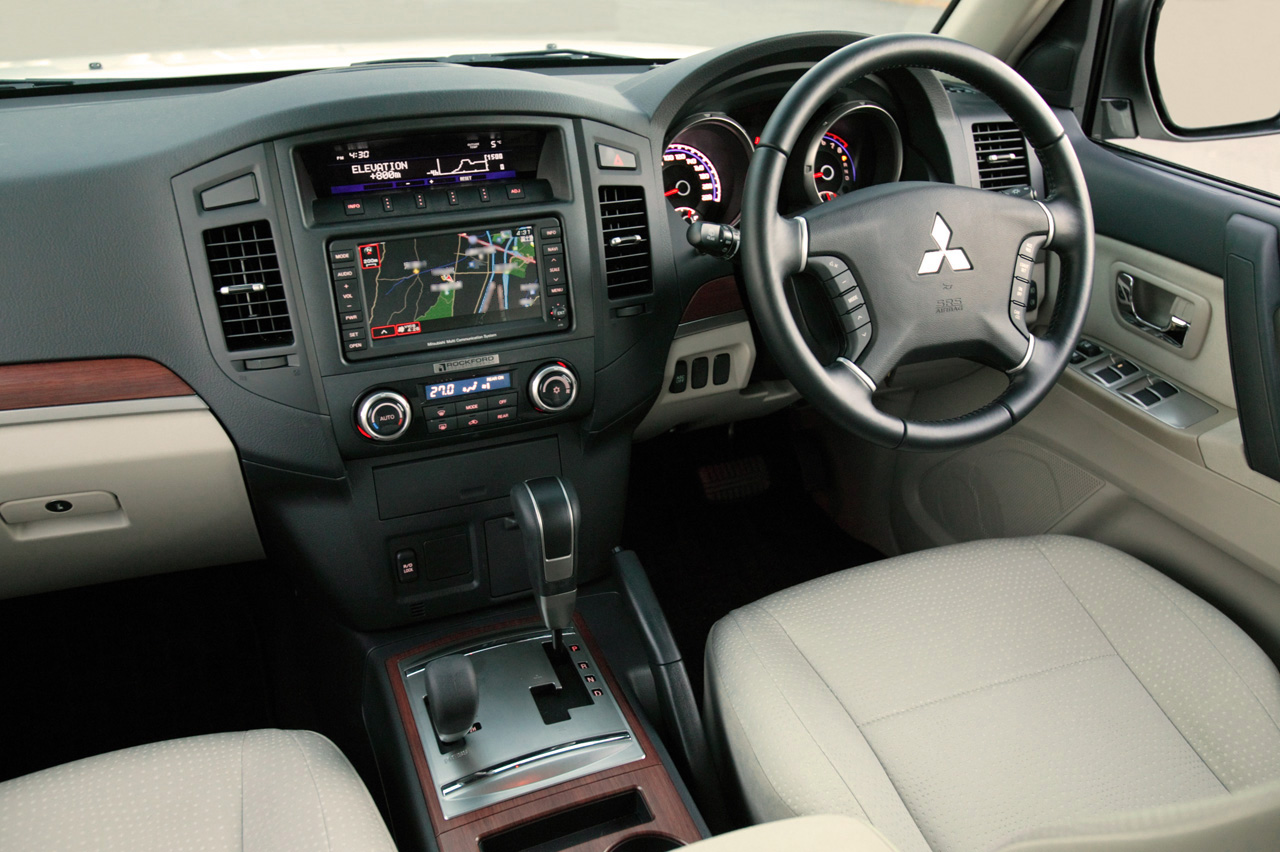
Interior

=== First facelift ===
For 2012, the Pajero model was minimally restyled and given an improved monocoque body and suspension for reduced NVH among other benefits, with the series designation "NW". Interior dashboard and instrument lighting was changed to red for better night vision. GLX and up received an electrochromic auto-dimming mirror as standard. Mitsubishi also removed the swirl flaps from the intake manifold to further improve reliability under the heavy carbonisation environment of modern direct injection engines with EGR.

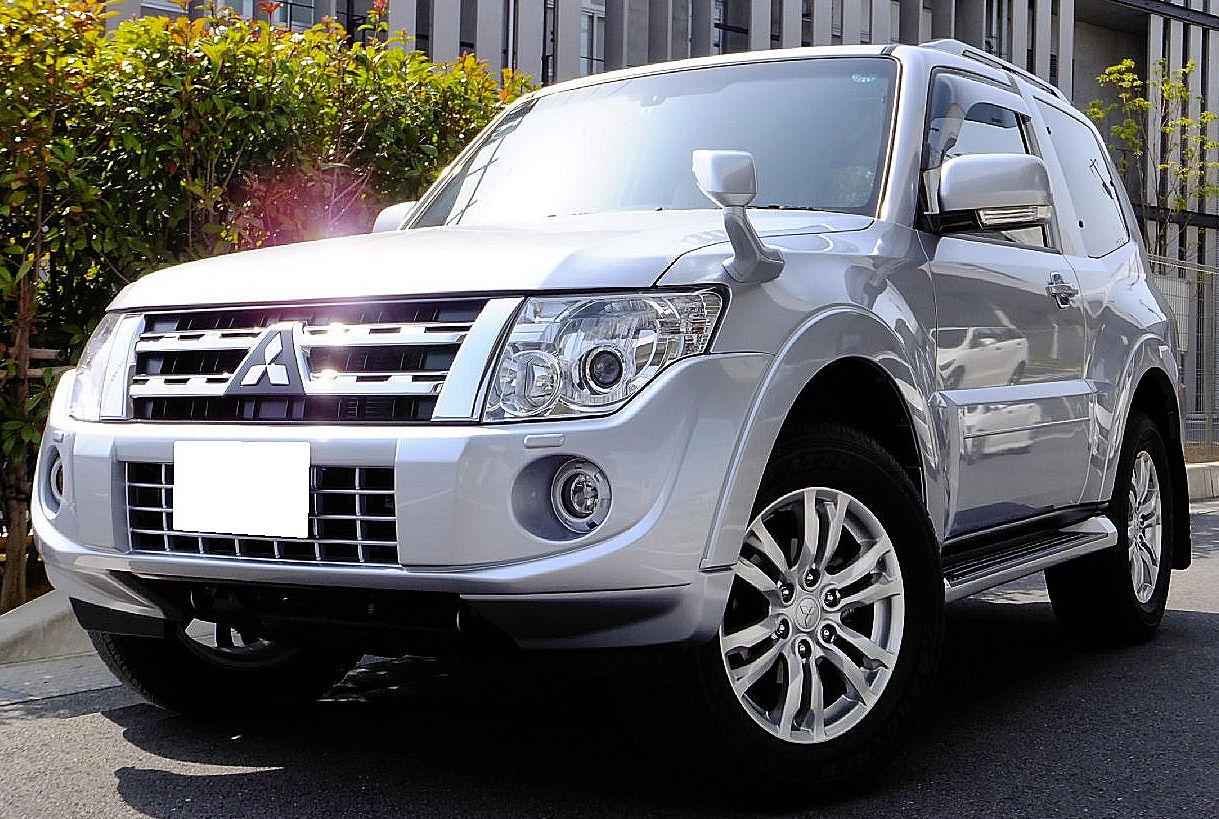
Mitsubishi Pajero VR-II (3-door; first facelift)

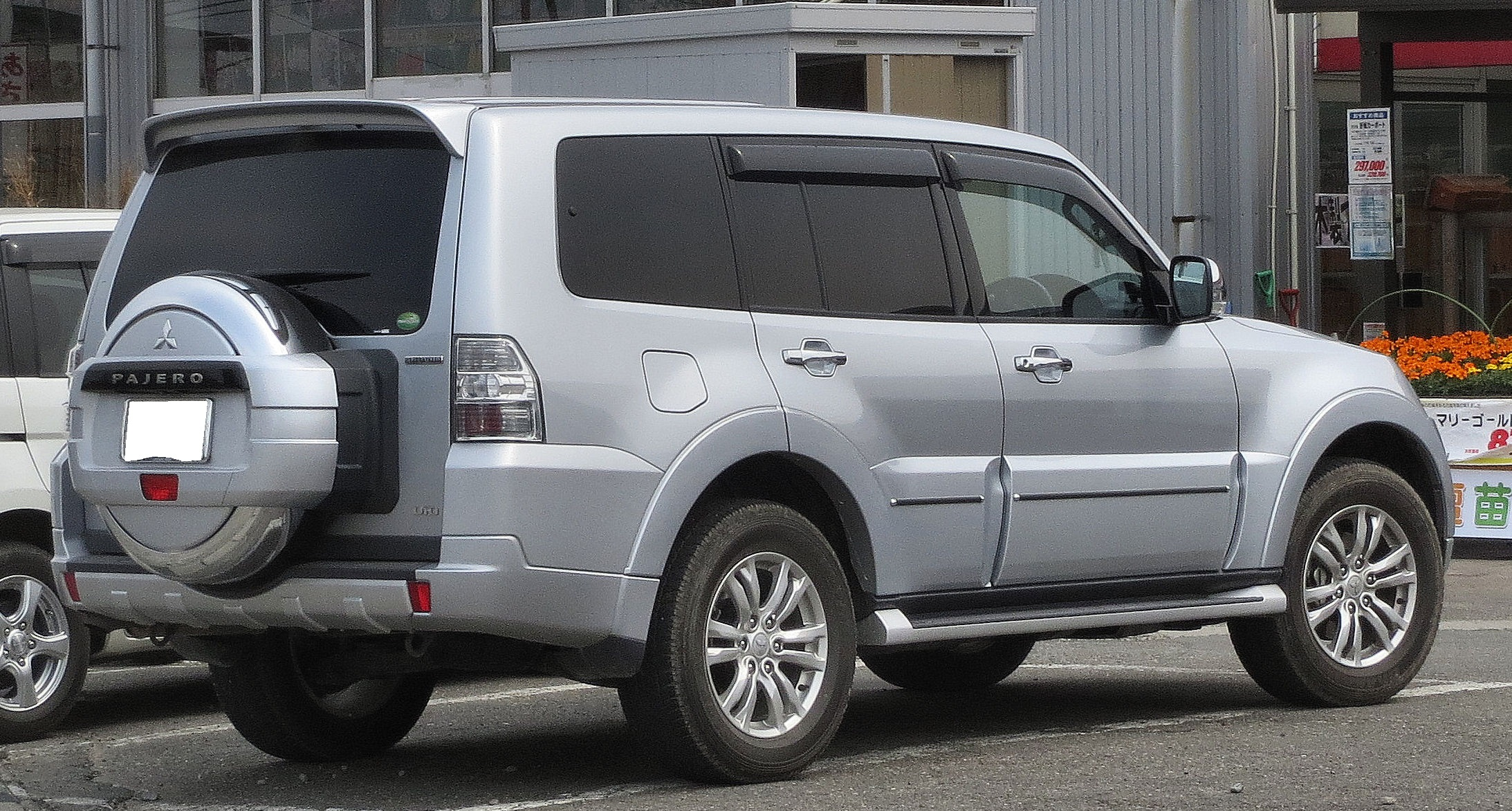
Mitsubishi Pajero Super Exceed (first facelift)

=== Second facelift ===
The Pajero received a second facelift in July 2014, for the 2015 model year, the Pajero received an updated front fascia with a revised grille, LED daytime running lights and a new spare tire cover under the series "NX". This series is the most recent, and the last to be produced. The automatic transmission was available on all trim levels, with manual only being offered in lower-tier vehicles. Early NX models came with no diesel particulate filter. From 2017 onwards, a DPF was standard, along with a 4 kW peak power reduction as a result, while torque remained the same.

The interior was revised to include piano black and metallic trim, or wood grain (depending on the market) for the Exceed and Super Exceed and additional sound deadening material as well as a newly styled subwoofer housing. Other standard features on Exceed models and above included rain-sensing wipers, an electrochromic auto-dimming rear-view mirror, factory-fitted side-steps, motorised pop-out headlight washers, factory-fitted discrete alarm, rear dust deflector/spoiler, sliding and tilting solar-glass sunroof, rear air-conditioning with its own compressor and settings, mirror-mounted indicators and puddle lights, heated side mirrors (activated via the rear demister switch) a rally-style rear fog running-light, aluminium pedals, a new "Smartlink" capacitive touch screen entertainment unit with Android Auto and Apple CarPlay, a revised sound system with new spatial sound options, 8-way adjustable heated front seats, a reversing camera, sonar reversing sensors, LED daytime running lights, HID auto-levelling headlights, auto-dimming high-beams, and warm-white halogen fog lights.

The engines were carried over and include the 3.0 L 6G72 V6, the 3.5 L 6G74 V6, the 3.8 L 6G75 MIVEC V6, the 2.8 L four-cylinder turbo diesel 4M40, and the 3.2 L 4M41 common rail four-cylinder turbo diesel.

The 3-door variant was discontinued in February 2018.

In April 2019, the "Final Edition" model was released. Based on Exceed variant, which was limited to 700 units.

The Pajero was discontinued in the Japanese market in September 2019. Production for international markets where demand remained high such as Australia, Asia, Africa, the Middle East and South America (among others) continued for some time, however production ceased completely in March 2021, with the last vehicles (Final Edition) to roll off the production line being delivered as MY2022 vehicles.

The changes in the Final Edition over the standard model are primarily cosmetic only, and include a hood protector, carpet floor mats, cargo lip cover, and a leather-wrapped owner's manual and service book. Other features include a winter package, rubber cargo liner and the Final Edition badging. Flagship Exceed models add a full leather interior, brushed aluminum pedals, and a sunroof.

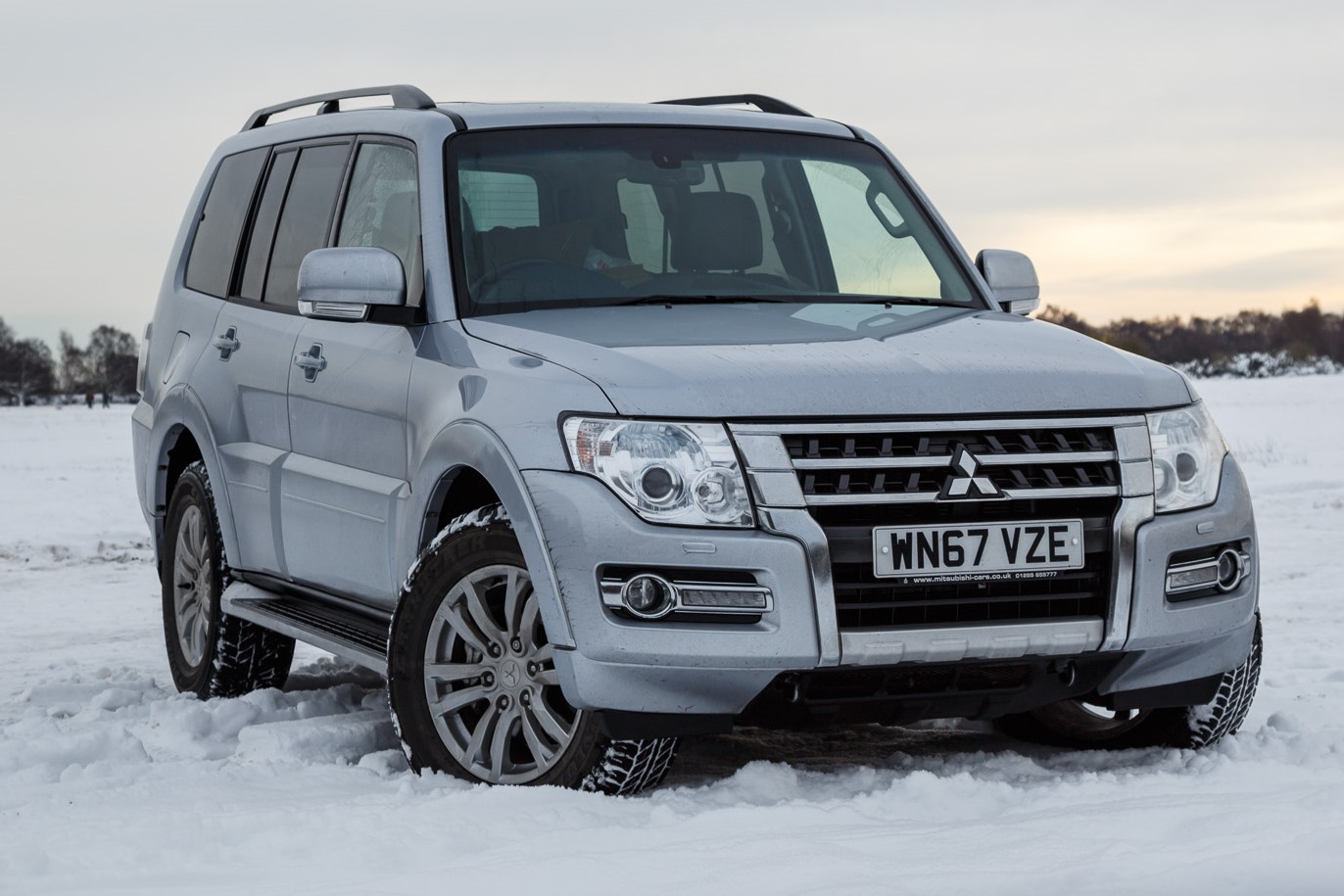
Mitsubishi Shogun (second facelift)

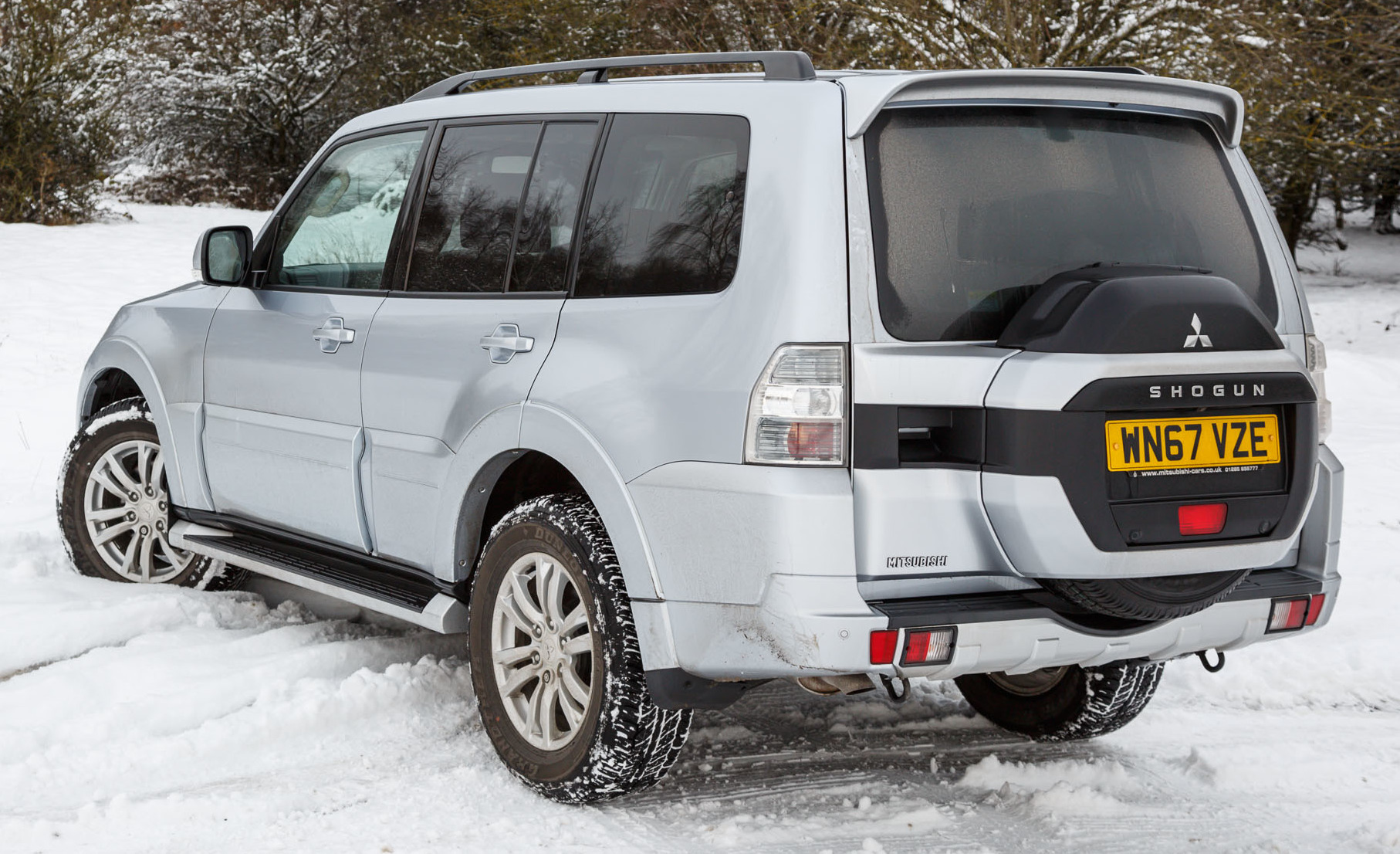
Mitsubishi Shogun (second facelift)

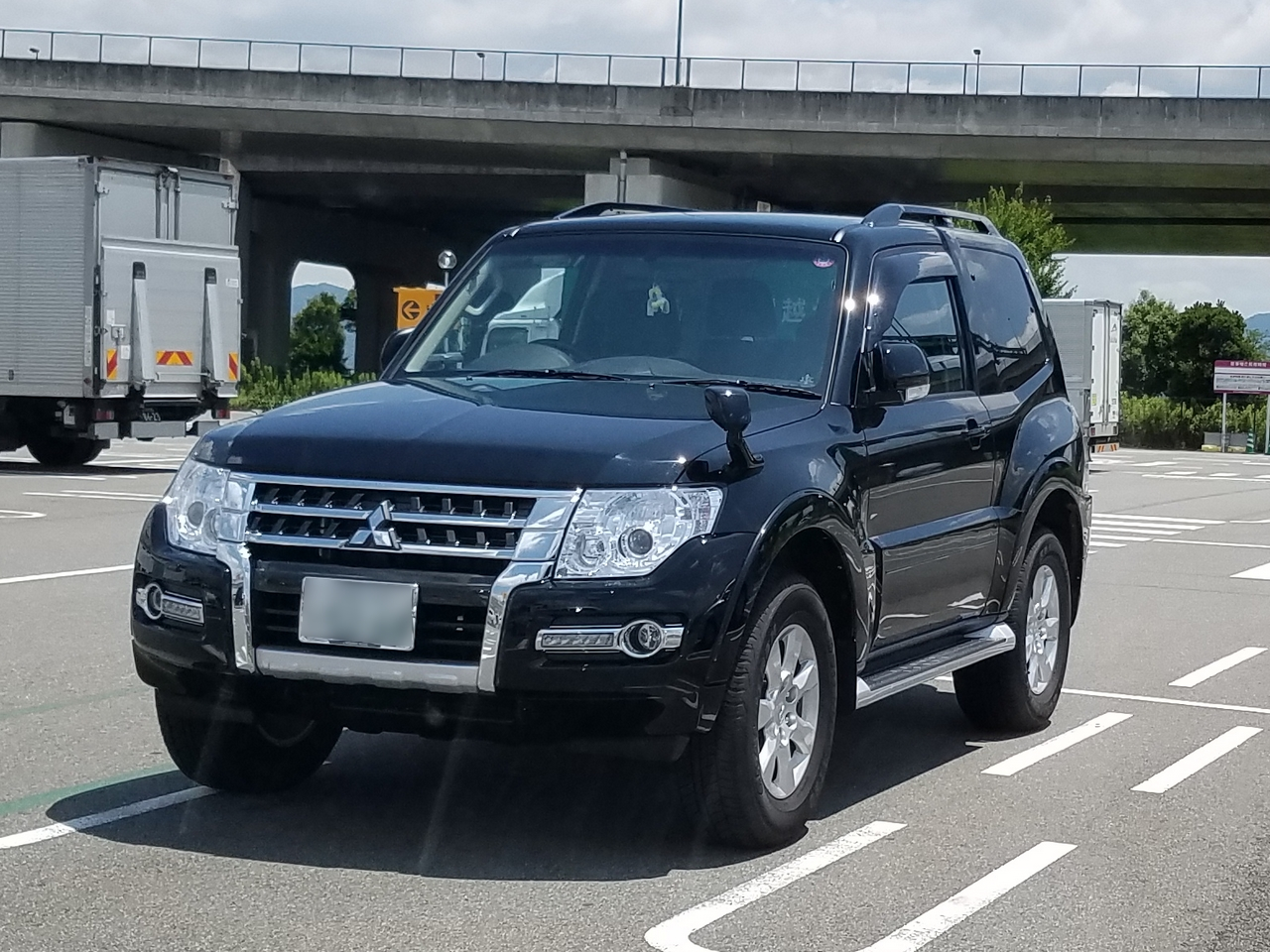
2014 Mitsubishi Pajero 3-door (second facelift)

=== Safety ===
ANCAP test results* Mitsubishi Pajero all variants (2011)
Test	Score
Overall	4 /5 stars
Frontal offset	11.41/16
Side impact	16/16
Pole	Not Assessed
Seat belt reminders	1/3
Whiplash protection	Not Assessed
Pedestrian protection	Poor
Electronic stability control	Standard

The redesigned, 4th Generation Pajero showed a significant focus on enhanced safety and crash performance over the previous generation.

Frontal impact testing showed excellent protection for the passenger all over, with the highest rating 'good' and full marks given. This rating was also given to the driver's head, which the testers noted the airbag cushioned very stably. Chest protection was considered adequate. Protection for the knees was considered marginal due to components of the steering column potentially causing damage.

Side protection was rated 'excellent' due to the model's addition of side curtain airbags. A side pole impact test was carried out and the Mitsubishi received full marks in all areas, with protection for the head and chest receiving the highest rating of 'good'.

Pedestrian protection was considered poor. As with most SUVs and 4WDs, pedestrian impacts are generally much worse than with sedans or smaller vehicles due to the higher area of impact on the pedestrian resulting in more head and chest damage than lower-height vehicles.

ANCAP test results* Mitsubishi Pajero all variants (2011)
Test	Score
Overall	5 /5 stars
Frontal offset	13.41/16
Side impact	16/16
Pole	2/2
Seat belt reminders	2/3
Whiplash protection	Not Assessed
Pedestrian protection	Poor
Electronic stability control	Standard

Safety was significantly improved in the 2013 and onward models (which includes vehicles produced to present day).

Particularly, Mitsubishi improved on the potential for knee injury noted in the previous test for NS and NT models.

Frontal impact testing showed excellent protection for the passenger all over, with the highest rating 'good' and full marks given for all areas of the dummy. This rating was also given to the driver's head, which the testers noted the airbag cushioned very stably. Head, neck and upper leg protection was flawless, receiving the full 4 marks. Chest protection received 3.90 out of the maximum possible 4.00 points. Improved upon from the earlier models was the knee protection noted in the previous test for NS and NT models, with much less chance for injury from dashboard components.

Side pole impact testing was similarly excellent, receiving the full 4 marks across all areas and a subsequent 100% rating. Protection for the head and neck received the highest possible marks of 'good' and 4.00 out the possible 4.00 points.

Pedestrian protection was considered poor. As with most SUVs and 4WDs, pedestrian impacts are generally much worse than with sedans or smaller vehicles due to the higher area of impact on the pedestrian resulting in more head and chest damage than lower-height vehicles.

As an occupant, the Pajero demonstrated great cabin integrity and passenger safety in all main seats with low risk of serious injury in both front and side impacts - of particular note is the solid side pole impact test results. Cabin integrity is in part due to Mitsubishi's RISE monocoque chassis design that provides a markedly stiffer frame and cabin structure over typical body on-frame (ladder-chassis) vehicles. Monocoque / unibody chassis designs typically offer excellent roll over protection as a result, though this was not an officially measured feature of the ANCAP test criteria at the time.

Unlike its sibling the Pajero Sport, the Pajero does not feature any autonomous driving aids such as AEB or LKA, which are a compulsory requirement for the 2020-onward ANCAP standards.

== Fifth generation (LH; 2026) ==
Fifth generation
- 2026 Pajero Super Exceed (Japan)

Overview
- Model code: LH3W (4WD)
- Also called: Mitsubishi Montero
- Production: 2026–present
- Assembly: Thailand: Laem Chabang (MMTh)
- Designer: Norihiko Yoshimine

Body and chassis
- Body style: 5-door SUV
- Related: Mitsubishi Triton (sixth generation) / Nissan Navara (D27)

Powertrain
- Engine: Diesel: 2.4 L 4N16 turbo I4
- Power output: 150 kW (201 hp; 204 PS)
- Transmission: 8-speed Aisin TL-80SN/TL-80NF automatic

Dimensions
- Wheelbase: 2,870 mm (113.0 in)
- Length: 4,920 mm (193.7 in)
- Width: 1,925 mm (75.8 in)
- Height: 1,900–1,910 mm (74.8–75.2 in)
- Curb weight: 2,383–2,460 kg (5,254–5,423 lb)

Chronology
- Predecessor: Mitsubishi Pajero Sport (Australia)

The fifth-generation Pajero was first teased on 29 May 2026, and four months later, it was unveiled on 2 September of the same year, marking the return of the nameplate after a five-year hiatus.

Production takes place in Thailand, and it first launch in 2026 in Thailand, Japan, Australia, before becoming available in April 2027 in around 100 countries, including in Latin America, ASEAN, and the Middle East. It is marketed as the Montero in certain other countries. However, no decision has been made by Mitsubishi to bring the Montero back to North America.

The production model's design incorporates elements of the Pajero's earlier generations, including the upright proportions, distinctive heritage-inspired exterior and interior details, and the triple gauges inspired by the first-generation model.

=== Overview ===
==== Exterior ====
Rear view

The exterior features rugged bodywork that uses the updated 'Dynamic Shield' design language. Features include metallic accents, signature LED daytime running T-shaped headlights and taillights, nameplate insignias on each side, and a shark fin at the top. It is also offered with two grille style options depending on the trim: the sportier honeycomb or horizontal bar.

Unlike the previous generation models, the fifth-generation Pajero's spare wheel is mounted under the vehicle instead on the tailgate, as consumers plan to use the vehicle not only for extreme off-road conditions but also in their daily usage and the tailgate can be used as a roof for outdoor use.

The fifth-generation Pajero is offered in 8 colour options, depending on the market.

==== Interior ====
Interior

The interior offers various materials wrapped around the seats and the cockpit, depending on the trim, utilizing embroidery dubbed the principle "Kimekomi", which draws inspiration from traditional Japanese elements. Other features include a mounted panoramic glass roof and a Yamaha Dynamic Sound Ultimate audio system incorporated into the interior. For the digital instrument cluster, higher trims offer a 14.3-inch display compared with the entry 12.3-inch, and they can be chosen from up to 16 background-themed dashboard options.

==== Driving modes ====
The Pajero offers seven driving modes: Normal, Eco, Gravel, Snow, Mud, Sand, and Rock.

==== Towing capacity ====
The fifth-generation Pajero has a braked towing capacity of 3,500 kg (7,716 lb), up 400 kg (882 lb) from the Pajero Sport.

=== Platform and chassis ===
The platform is shared with the sixth-generation Triton. Unlike the third- and fourth-generation models, the fifth-generation Pajero's chassis is built in body-on-frame construction, similar to the first- and second-generation models, and the suspension uses an independent double wishbone on the front and a five-link coil-sprung setup with live/solid axle for the rear.

The front section of the ladder frame is also shared with the sixth-generation Triton, while the rest of the frame has been modified compared to its pickup truck sibling. The modification includes additional cross-members and larger side members, as well as "advancement in materials and engineering technology" to increase rigidity over the Triton. High-tensile steel usage is claimed to reduce the weight of components by 50 percent, while aluminium is used for the bonnet.

=== Powertrain ===
==== Engine ====
The fifth-generation Pajero is powered with a 2.4-litre 4N16 four-cylinder turbo-diesel engine, producing 150 kW (201 hp; 204 PS) and 470–480 N⋅m (347–354 lb⋅ft) of torque, paired with an eight-speed automatic transmission.

==== Drivetrain ====
The fifth-generation Pajero uses Mitsubishi's Super All Wheel Control (S-AWC) system along with Super Select 4WD-II four-wheel-drive system used in the previous generations. A rear-wheel drive configuration is also available for the first time for certain markets.

=== Markets ===
==== Asia ====
===== Japan =====
Sales of the fifth-generation Pajero in Japan will begin on 17 December 2026, with four grade levels: GLS, GSR, Exceed, and Super Exceed. Four-wheel drive is standard on all grades. Both "Classic Modern Style" and "Urban Shift Style" are available as options. Orders reached 5,500 units since October.

===== Thailand =====
The fifth-generation Pajero went on sale in Thailand on 19 October 2026, with three grade levels: GLS, GSR, and Super Exceed. The GLS and GSR grades are offered with rear-wheel drive, while the Super Exceed grade is offered with four-wheel drive as standard.

==== Oceania ====
===== Australia =====
The fifth-generation Pajero will be on sale in Australia in December 2026. It is offered in GLS 5, GLS 7, Exceed and GSR grades with standard four-wheel drive.

== Use in military ==
In 1996, Mitsubishi Motors began using Pajero as a basis for their JSDF vehicle Type 73 (Shin), replacing their Jeep-based predecessors (Kyū) in their fleet.

A variant of the second generation Pajero is used by the JSDF as the Mitsubishi Type 73 light truck (Shin).

In 2009, the Irish Defence Force placed an order for 320 units of the Generation 4 Pajero NT for use domestically as well as overseas. The vehicles were selected due to their suitability for varied roles likely to be encountered. The fitout included steel wheels, side steps, a bespoke tubular bullbar protecting the radiator and grille with a large HF antenna mounted to it when used in communications roles. Despite their intended military use, they were not fitted with lifted suspension and off-road tyres. The Pajeros that were deployed locally within Ireland, were used for prison transfer and Cash-in-Transit escorts as well as for military driving training courses. These were painted a matte forest green colour and sometimes featured an emergency services light bar. The Pajero was also deployed by the Irish Defence Forces overseas as a light unarmoured patrol vehicle and as a communications vehicle for UN Peacekeeping where it sported the traditional white UN livery. In the peacekeeping role some vehicles featured dual HF antennas with an additional encrypted UHF antenna mounted on a box-style mount on the rearmost pillar.

Around 2011, the Indian Army placed an order for a dozen or so Mitsubishi Pajero to deploy on the Indo Chinese border, along Sikkim.

== Global sales figures ==
Year	Production	Domestic sales (Japan)	Export sales
1982	16,930	8,059	7,023
1983	33,605	8,076	25,886
1984	41,422	9,176	32,341
1985	59,770	11,770	49,249
1986	87,252	16,636	70,594
1987	89,456	22,170	67,021
1988	107,157	25,225	79,699
1989	116,883	36,483	82,176
1990	108,730	36,061	71,206
1991	144,988	64,381	80,882
1992	174,708	83,685	89,835
1993	158,922	67,899	88,788
1994	161,238	54,329	106,570
1995	152,102	44,933	110,365
1996	128,593	28,851	99,200
1997	136,941	26,181	111,144
1998	95,675	9,412	90,416
1999	90,524	20,189	65,212
2000	138,315	12,701	129,198
2001	91,700	6,725	85,324
2002	112,161	5,681	106,376
2003	90,929	6,035	85,863
2004	79,152	4,196	74,347
2005	69,142	2,781	66,773
2006	75,933	6,025	68,563
2007	112,103	3,818	108,982
2008	57,903	2,738	58,000
2009	48,055	2,198	44,896
2010	66,569	2,948	64,207
2011	61,603	3,209	58,842
2012	39,759	2,029	38,300
2013	55,066	2,213	52,199
2014	54,267	2,948	52,548
2015	53,393	1,665	51,340
2016	45,406	1,062	44,030
2017	36,142	1,000	35,150
2018	46,637	1,823	44,430

Sources: Pajero 4WD 20 Year History (Japanese), Facts & Figures 2005, Facts & Figures 2008, Facts & Figures 2011, Facts & Figures 2015 Mitsubishi Motors website, Facts & Figures 2018 Mitsubishi Motors website, Facts & Figures 2019 Mitsubishi Motors website
