= Proton Juara =

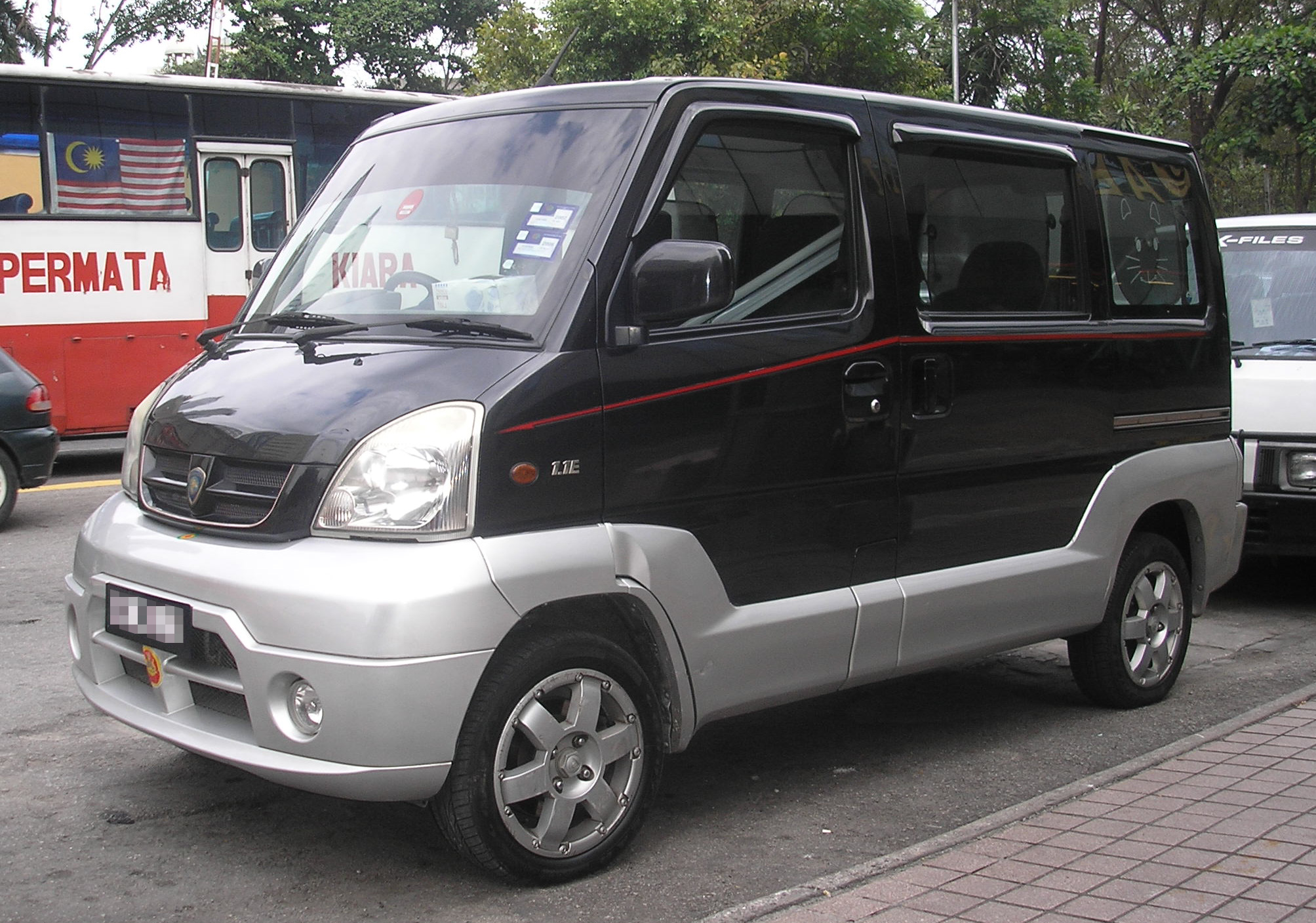

Overview
- Manufacturer: Proton
- Also called: Proton RGW
- Production: 2001–2004
- Assembly: Malaysia: Pekan, Pahang (AMM)

Body and chassis
- Class: Microvan/Mini MPV
- Body style: 5-door van
- Layout: Front-engine, rear-wheel drive
- Related: Mitsubishi Town Box Wide

Powertrain
- Engine: 1.1L Mitsubishi 4A31 S4 I4
- Transmission: 4-speed automatic

Dimensions
- Wheelbase: 2,390 mm (94.1 in)
- Length: 3,660 mm (144.1 in)
- Width: 1,535 mm (60.4 in)
- Height: 1,810 mm (71.3 in)
- Kerb weight: 1,005 kg (2,216 lb)

Chronology
- Successor: Proton Exora (indirect)

The Proton Juara is a microvan/mini MPV produced by the Malaysian automobile manufacturer Proton between 2001 and 2004. It was launched on 22 July 2001 as Proton’s first non-saloon, hatchback or coupé model. The Juara was to be jointly developed by Proton and Mitsubishi Motors as an export model under the Mitsubishi badge. However, its poor reception and slow sales led to an early end to its production in 2004.

== Etymology ==
The name Juara means "Champion" in Malay.

== History ==
=== Pre-launch ===
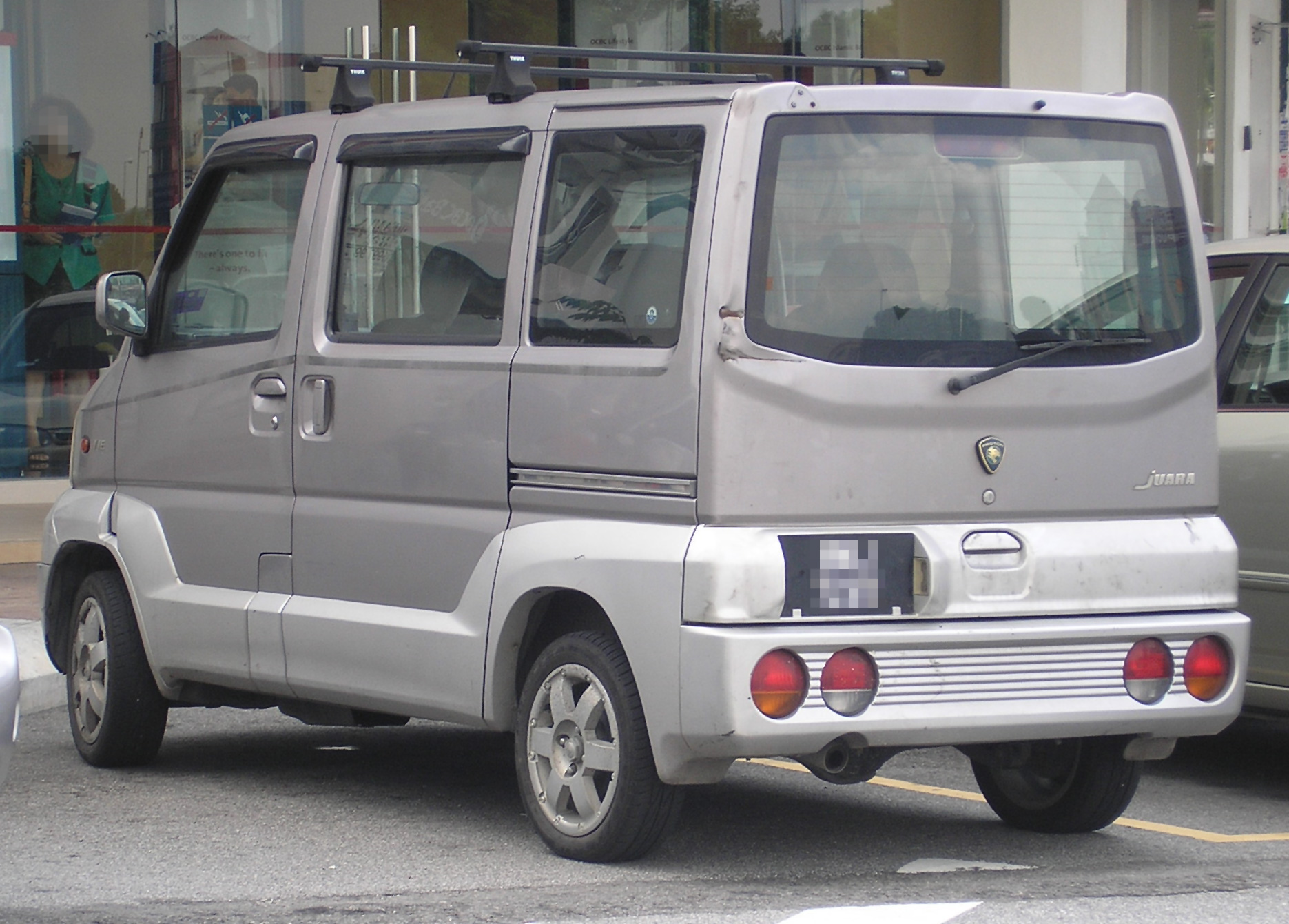
Proton Juara (rear).

The first sketches of a Proton MPV (multi-purpose vehicle) existed as early as the 1990s, during the dawn of the MPV era. During this period, all of Proton's offerings were either saloon, hatchback or coupe vehicles. Proton began development of their first MPV, then codenamed 'Proton RGW', in late 1999. It was based on the Mitsubishi Town Box Wide platform, which Proton had intended to re-engineer over 2 or 3 years to suit different tastes. Mitsubishi Motors had also expressed intentions to rebadge the re-engineered Proton version as a Mitsubishi car for export markets. The joint development had aimed to lower costs for both companies, where Proton would be spared from paying royalties to Mitsubishi for the use of their platforms, and Mitsubishi would save on production costs if Proton were to re-engineer cars for them. Proton officially announced their MPV plans to the public in early 2000, and by November that same year, the first prototype had been completed. Production of the MPV began in the second quarter of 2001 at the HICOM Automotive Manufacturers Malaysia (present-day DRB-HICOM) plant in Pekan, Pahang.

=== Post-launch ===
The Proton Juara was launched on 22 July 2001 at the Kuala Lumpur City Centre (KLCC) Esplanade. The launch was endorsed by the fourth Prime Minister of Malaysia, Tun Dr. Mahathir Mohamad. The name Juara was only revealed on its launch date, and it was intended to pay tribute to the nation's sports champions of that period.

The Juara was to be a niche product, and was deemed a 'lifestyle vehicle' as well as a Mini MPV by Proton. However, the Juara's unconventional kei car dimensions and van-like design was not well received by the Malaysian public. Nonetheless, the Juara's unique package makes it highly versatile and practical. It offers three rows and up to six individual seats, depending on the configuration. Both the second and third row seats can be moved, removed or folded with ease. The overall looks of the Juara remained largely unchanged over the Mitsubishi Town Box Wide which it is based on, bar the unique Proton corporate front grille, front bumper, bodyside mouldings and 14-inch alloy rims. The Juara also came standard with dual front power windows with anti-trap, power-adjusted wing mirrors, follow-me-home lights and a CD-radio player.

The Proton Juara is powered by a 1.1-litre Mitsubishi 4A31 S4 4-cylinder EFI petrol engine which produces 71 hp or 53 kW of power at 6,000 rpm and 94 Nm of torque at 4,500 rpm respectively. Only a 4-speed automatic was offered. The Juara has a top speed of 135 km/h and a 0–100 km/h time of 18.1 seconds. Its suspension setup consists of MacPherson struts at the front and trailing arms in the rear. Proton claimed to have tuned the suspension for car-like handling based on expertise gained from Lotus. Uniquely, the Juara is one of only a handful of Proton cars to be rear-wheel driven (FR layout). The Juara also became the first Proton to feature Electric Power Steering (EPS).

Safety-wise, the Proton Juara came equipped with a reinforced body structure with anti-intrusion bars, as well as front-ventilated disc brakes and rear drum brakes respectively. The brake line also has a load-sensing proportioning valve which prevents rear wheel lock-up on wet surfaces when the Juara is lightly loaded. However, there are no airbags or an Anti-lock Braking System (ABS).

The Proton Juara was sold in four colours, namely yellow, silver, iridium, and black, all of which have two-tone combinations on the bumpers and bodyside mouldings. The car was sold in several trim variants, of which the 1.1E was most popular, which retailed at around RM49,200 at launch. Its closest rival was the Perodua Kenari.

The Juara's market performance was generally poor, with production stopping a few months after its introduction in July 2001. However, production resumed in mid-2002 with significantly reduced pricing, but sales remained unsustainable. Some people even referred Proton Juara as "moving fridge" (Malay: peti sejuk bergerak) due to its odd bulky shape.

Proton discontinued production of the Juara altogether in 2004. The car was never exported from its domestic market. On 15 April 2009, the Juara received a spiritual successor in the form of the Proton Exora. Unlike the Juara, the Exora has become a best-seller for Proton both domestically and in neighbouring export markets.

== Sales ==
Year	Malaysia (Note: Figures based on registration)
2001	816
2002	645
2003	696
2004	892
2005	346
2006	10
2007	3
2008	3
2009	1
