= Mitsubishi Town Box =

The Mitsubishi Town Box is a kei car (Town Box) and minivan (Town Box Wide) produced for the Japanese domestic market (JDM) by the Japanese automaker Mitsubishi Motors. It was initially available with the alloy-headed 4A30 657 cc inline-four engine, but switched to the 3G83 659 cc straight-three engine in 2002. From June 1999 until August 2001, a slightly larger version of the same vehicle powered by a 4A31 1.1 L straight-four, the Mitsubishi Town Box Wide, was also available. The first generation Town Box was discontinued in November 2011, ending the twelve-year production run. The nameplate returned in February 2014 on a rebadged version of the Suzuki Every Wagon.

The first generation Town Box was also sold in Japan as the Nissan Clipper Rio, while the Town Box Wide was also produced under licence in Malaysia as the Proton Juara.

== First generation (U61W/62W/63W/64W; 1999) ==
Mitsubishi Town Box (first generation)
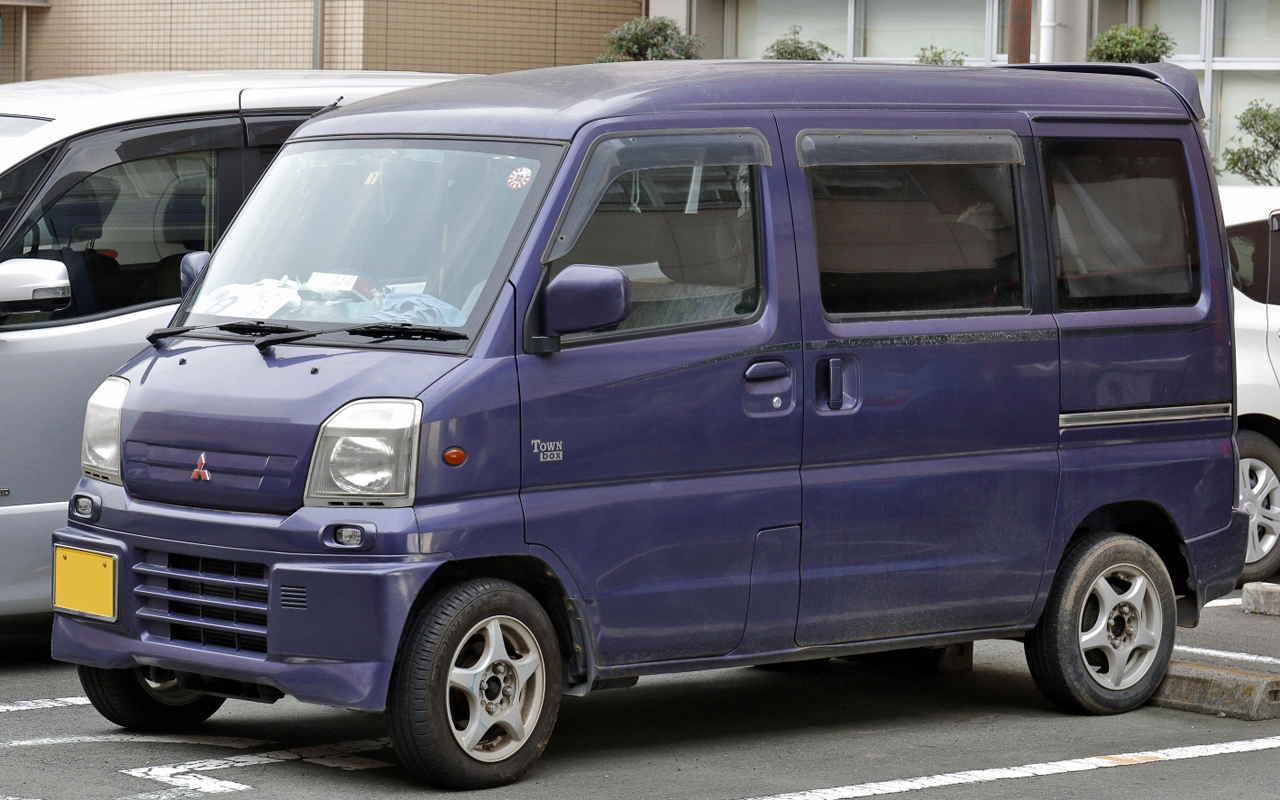
- First generation Mitsubishi Town Box (Early model)

Overview
- Manufacturer: Mitsubishi Motors
- Also called: Nissan Clipper Rio; Proton Juara (Town Box Wide)
- Production: April 1999–November 2011 (Town Box); June 1999–August 2001 (Town Box Wide); June 2007–January 2012 (Clipper Rio)
- Assembly: Mizushima plant, Kurashiki, Okayama, Japan

Body and chassis
- Class: Microvan (Town Box); Minivan (Town Box Wide)
- Body style: 5-door van
- Layout: Front-engine, rear-wheel-drive Front-engine, four-wheel-drive
- Related: Mitsubishi Minicab; CMC Veryca

Powertrain
- Engine: 657 cc 3G83 I3; 657 cc 3G83 turbo I3; 659 cc 4A30 turbo I4; 1094 cc 4A31 I4 (Town Box Wide)
- Transmission: 4-speed automatic 5-speed manual

Dimensions
- Wheelbase: 2,390 mm (94.1 in)
- Length: Town Box: 3,395 mm (133.7 in); Town Box Wide: 3,605 mm (141.9 in)
- Width: Town Box: 1,475 mm (58.1 in); Town Box Wide: 1,535 mm (60.4 in)
- Height: Town Box: 1,890 mm (74.4 in); Town Box Wide: 1,810 mm (71.3 in)
- Curb weight: Town Box: 970–1,030 kg (2,138–2,271 lb); Town Box Wide: 990–1,050 kg (2,183–2,315 lb)

Chronology
- Predecessor: Mitsubishi Minicab Bravo

The first generation Town Box went on sale in April 1999. It was a mid-engined, rear-wheel drive (optional four-wheel drive was available) with a short bonnet. It was more passenger-oriented than the company's Bravo series. The rear seat used separate chairs rather than a bench and recessions in the floors provided additional leg space for the rear seat passengers. Also unusual was the parking brake, which was located outboard of the driver's seat, next to the door. In November 2000, the Town Box received an early facelift as a result of market resistance, including a redesigned front clip with more conventional headlamps. At the same time, the rear seat was replaced with a more typical, split, folding rear bench, and the parking brake handle was relocated in the usual position between the seats.

The initial lineup consisted of the SX, LX, and the turbocharged RX models. All were available with two- or four-wheel-drive, with either four-speed automatic or five-speed manual transmissions, with a standard high roof (with the option of a sunroof). The engines were a three-cylinder, 12-valve, MVV (lean burn) 3G83 engine for the LX and SX (U61W, U62W with 4WD), or the turbocharged and intercooled, DOHC 20-valve, four-cylinder 4A30 engine for the sporting RX version (U63W, U64W with 4WD). Power outputs are 48 PS (35 kW) at 6,000 rpm and torque of 62 N⋅m (46 lb⋅ft) at 4,000 rpm for the naturally aspirated model, 64 PS (47 kW) at 6,500 rpm and torque of 98 N⋅m (72 lb⋅ft) at 3,000 rpm.

In August 2002, anticipating new, stricter emissions standards, the Town Box RX switched from the highly tuned 4A30 engine to a single-cam, 12-valve, intercooled and turbocharged version of the 3G83 engine also fitted to the naturally aspirated versions. Claimed power remained 64 PS (47 kW), now at 6,000 rpm, likely the result of underreporting the output of the earlier model to stay within the parameters of the gentlemen's agreement to limit kei cars to that number. Torque was significantly lower, at 86 N⋅m (64 lb⋅ft) at 3,000 rpm.

=== Town Box Wide (U65W/66W) ===
In June 1999, the 1.1-liter Town Box Wide was presented. Not being a kei car meant that it could be wider and longer without incurring tax penalties; Mitsubishi thus fitted it with plastic overfenders and much larger bumpers. The larger 4A31 engine produces 75 PS (55 kW) at 6,000 rpm and has a maximum torque of 100 N⋅m (74 lb⋅ft) at 4,000 rpm. The Town Box Wide also has a lower, flat roof than the regular Town Box, and seats six people in three rows of two individual chairs. The last row, however, were in the way of emergence seats which folded into the side panels and Mitsubishi themselves referred to the car as a "4 + 2 seater".

Only a single version was available, with either rear-wheel-drive (U65W) or "Easy Select" switchable four-wheel-drive (U66W). It received a minor change in 2000, when the handbrake was moved to the traditional position between the front seats. The Town Box Wide was also built in Malaysia as the Proton Juara, although the Juara received an additional body kit. The Juara was not successful, and neither was the Town Box Wide. Its odd appearance and limited space, being no larger on the inside than the kei class model, meant that the car had no real selling point while costing a lot more to own and operate than a regular Town Box. Production ended in August 2001, just over two years after it was first introduced. Just under 4,300 examples were sold in Japan (nearly four fifths of those were sold during 1999 which was not even a full year), with another 3,300 exported to Malaysia for local assembly by Proton.

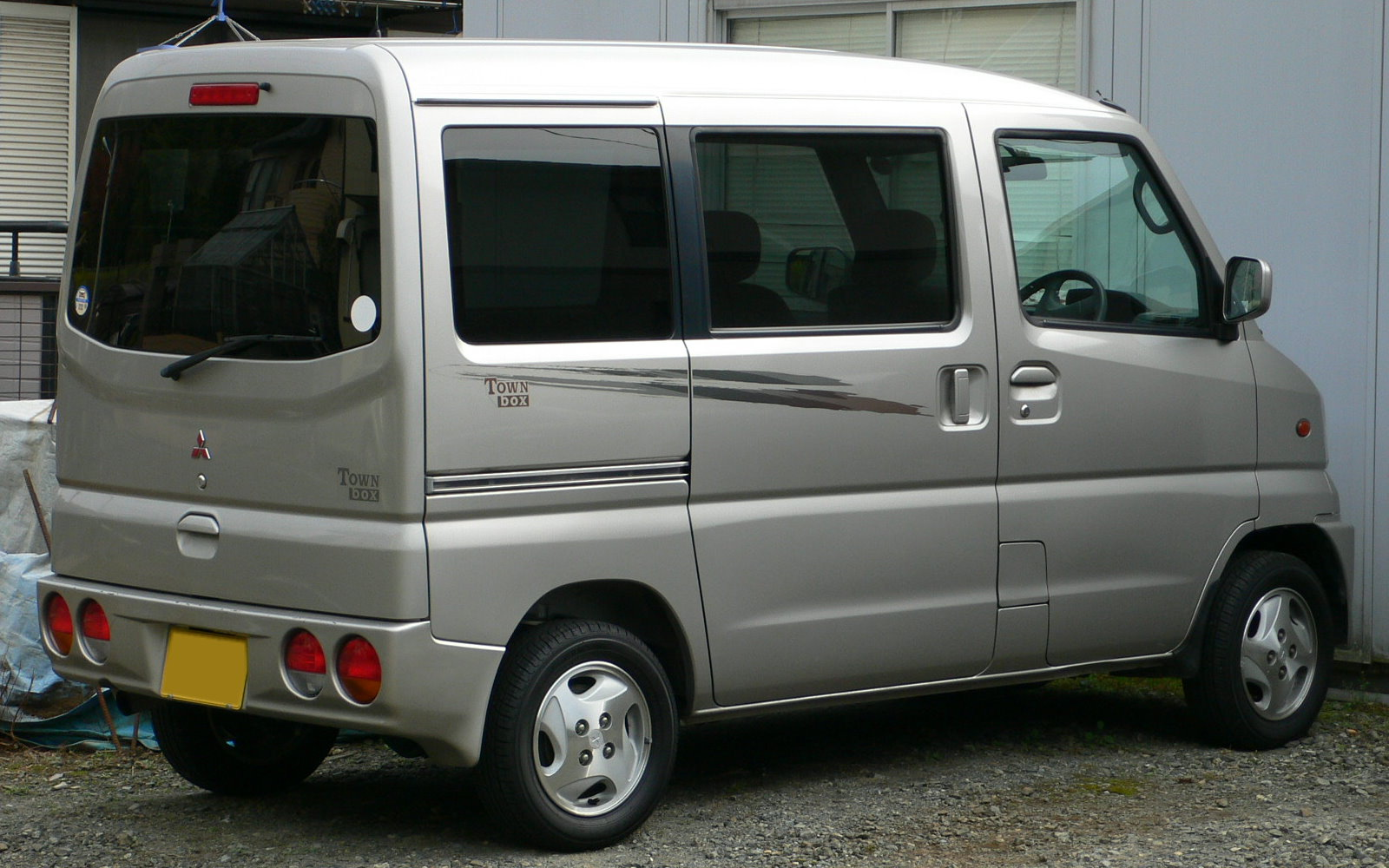
1999 Mitsubishi Town Box (pre-facelift; rear view)

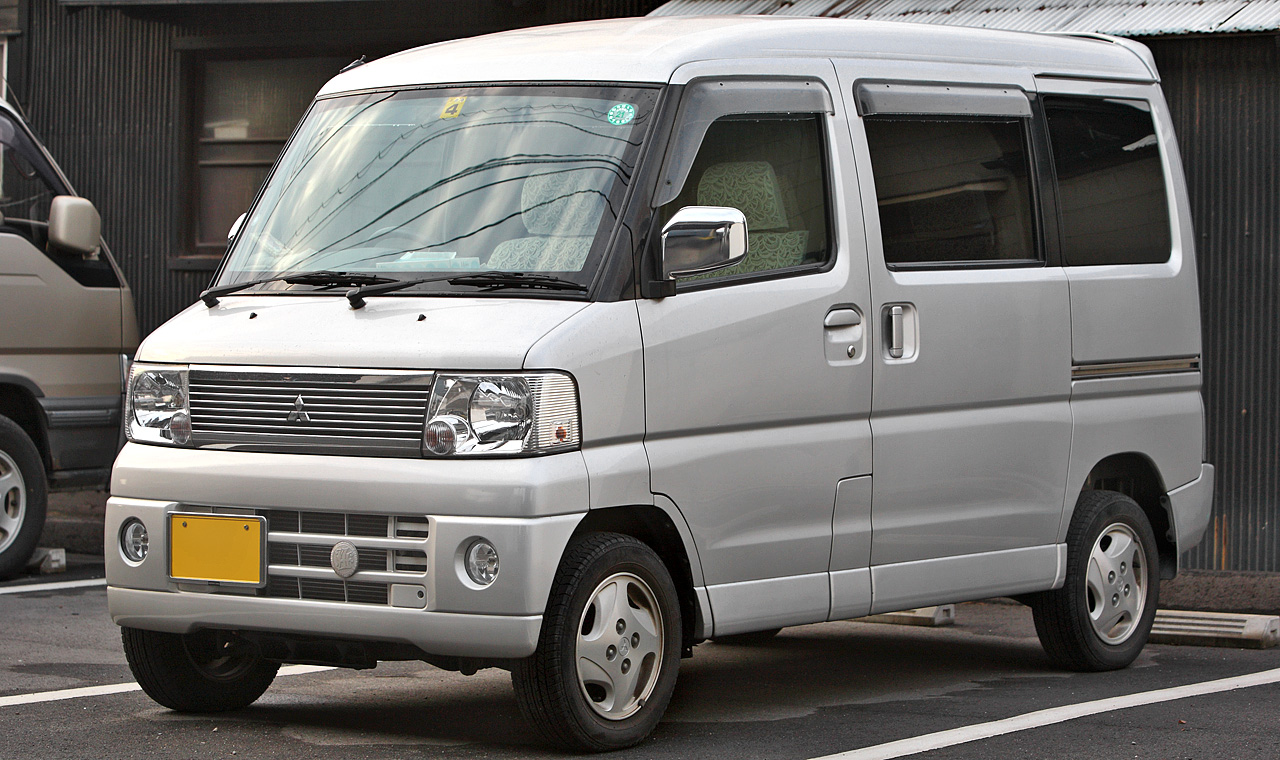
Mitsubishi Town Box (first facelift model, November 2000 to December 2007)

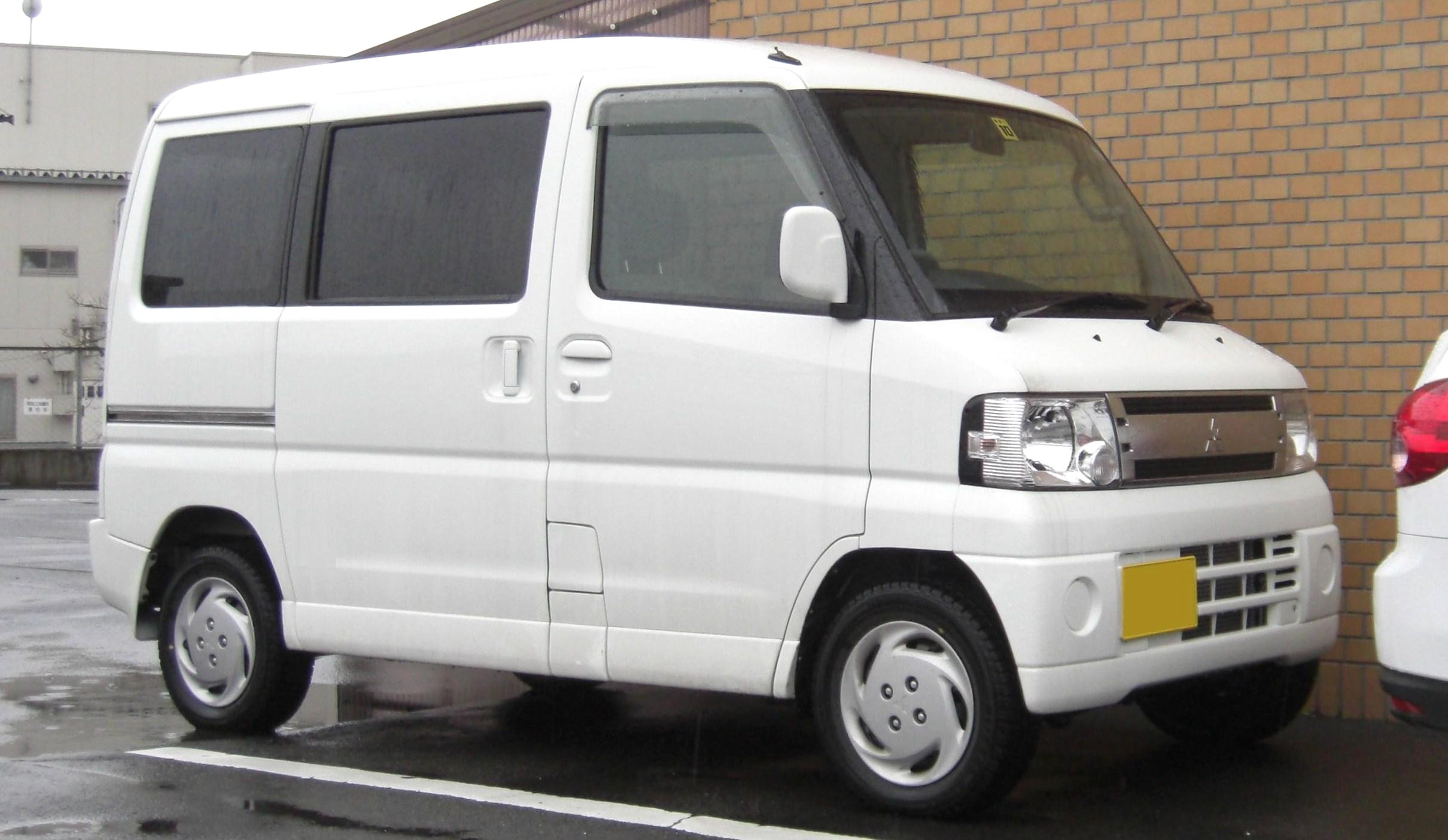
Mitsubishi Town Box (second facelift model, December 2007 to November 2011)

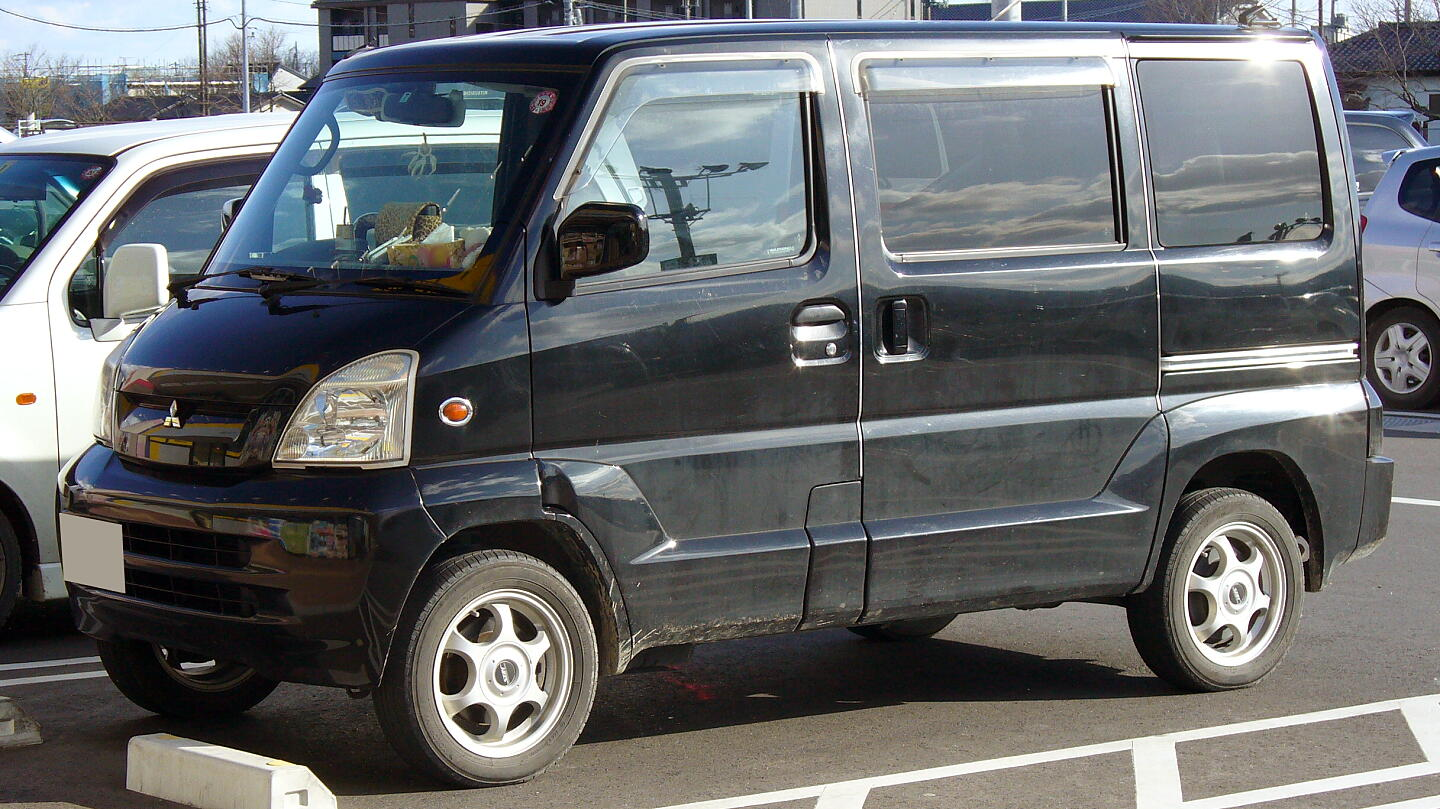
Mitsubishi Town Box Wide

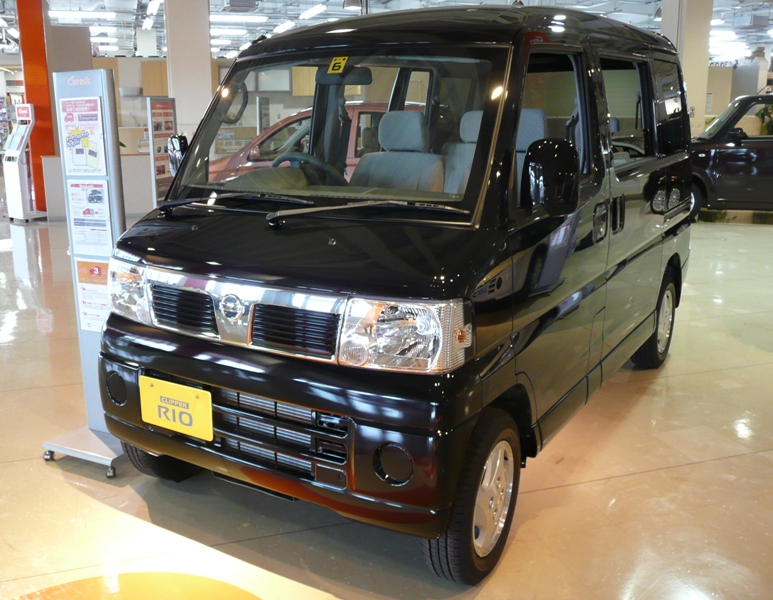
2007 Nissan Clipper Rio

== Second and third generations (Suzuki OEM deal) ==
Mitsubishi Town Box (second/third generations)
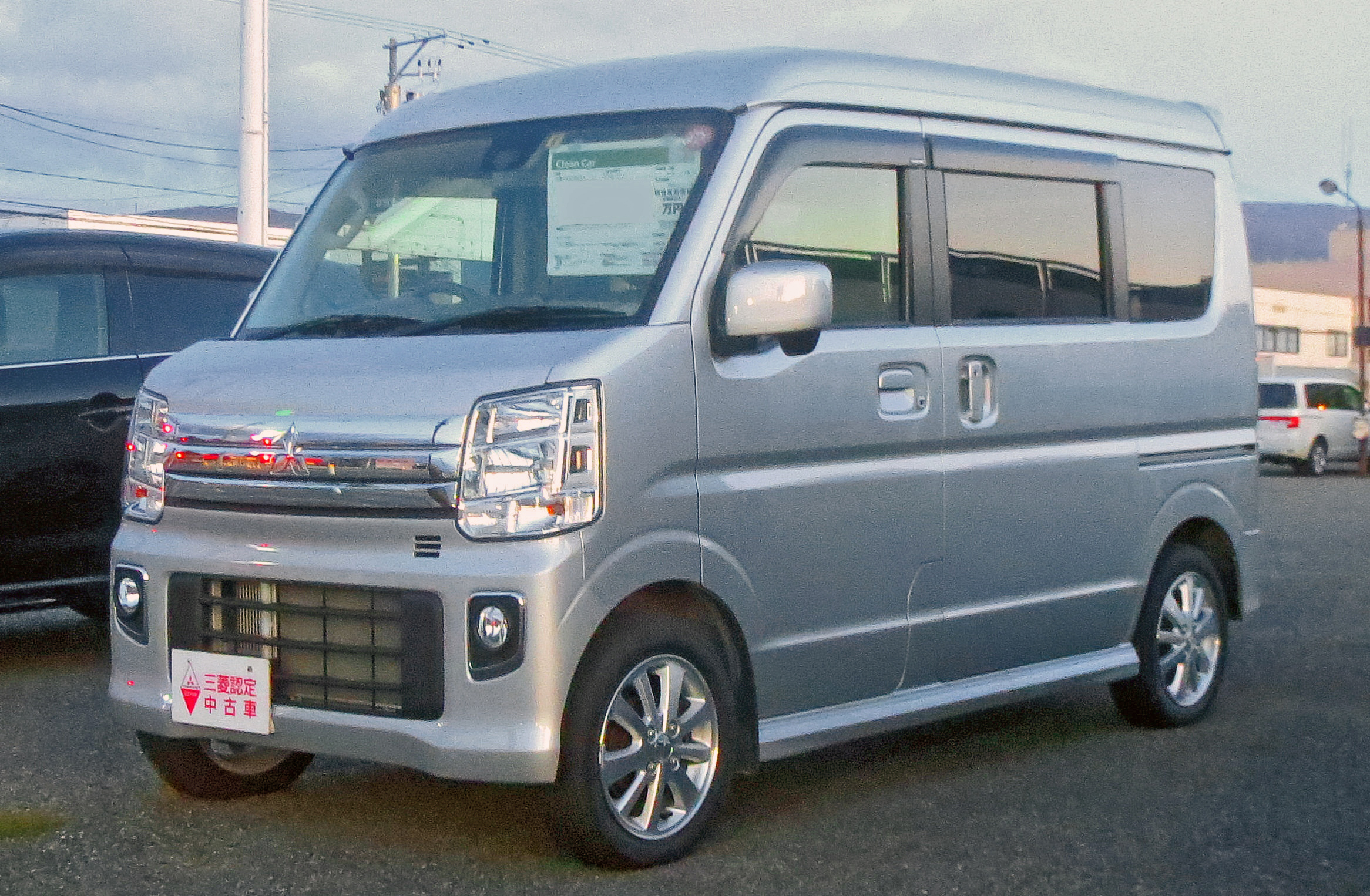
- Third generation Mitsubishi Town Box (DS17W)

Overview
- Manufacturer: Suzuki
- Also called: Suzuki Every Wagon; Nissan NV100 Clipper Rio (2013–2024); Nissan Clipper Rio (2024–present); Mazda Scrum Wagon
- Production: February 2014–present

Body and chassis
- Class: Microvan
- Body style: 5-door van
- Layout: Front-engine, rear-wheel-drive Front-engine, four-wheel-drive

Powertrain
- Engine: 658 cc K06A I3 (DS64W); 658 cc R06A I3 (DS17W)
- Transmission: 4-speed automatic 5-speed manual

Dimensions
- Wheelbase: DS64W: 2,400 mm (94.5 in); DS17W: 2,430 mm (95.7 in)
- Length: 3,395 mm (133.7 in)
- Width: 1,475 mm (58.1 in)
- Height: 1,795–1,910 mm (70.7–75.2 in)
- Curb weight: 950–1,040 kg (2,094–2,293 lb)

In February 2014, Mitsubishi started selling rebadged Suzuki Carry trucks and Every vans as the Mitsubishi Minicab. The passenger-oriented Every Wagon, which has a more designed rear end but shares the Carry Van's chassis code, was also included and received the Town Box badge (DS64W). As the Every only had a year of production left, Mitsubishi did not spend a lot of effort to distinguish their model, restraining themselves to changing the badging. In March 2015 a new Every Wagon and Town Box was introduced (DS17W). The newest model offers increased interior space, a longer wheelbase, and the new Suzuki R06A engine; turbocharged and intercooled. It is offered in G and G Special specs.

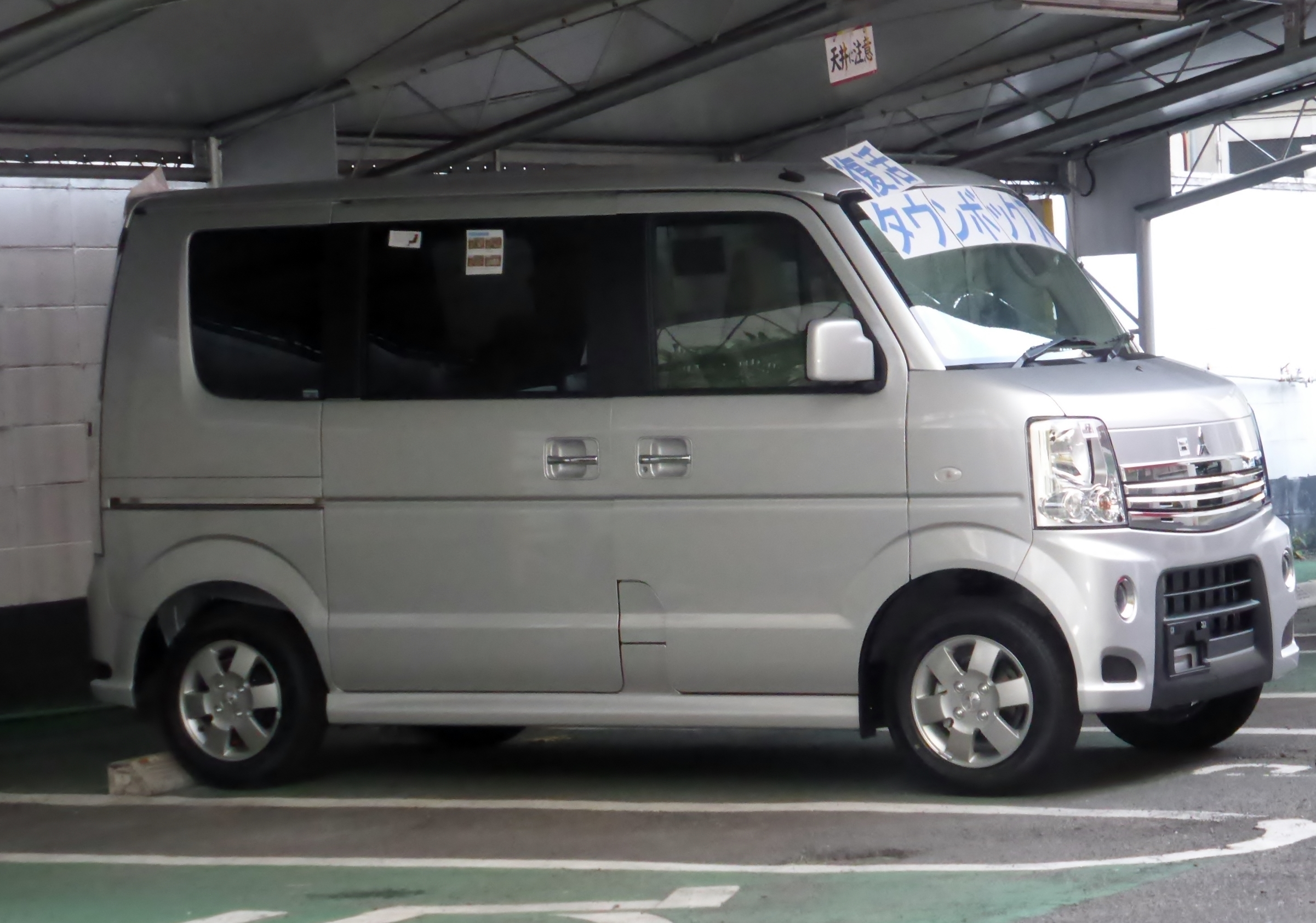
Second generation Mitsubishi Town Box G (DS64W)

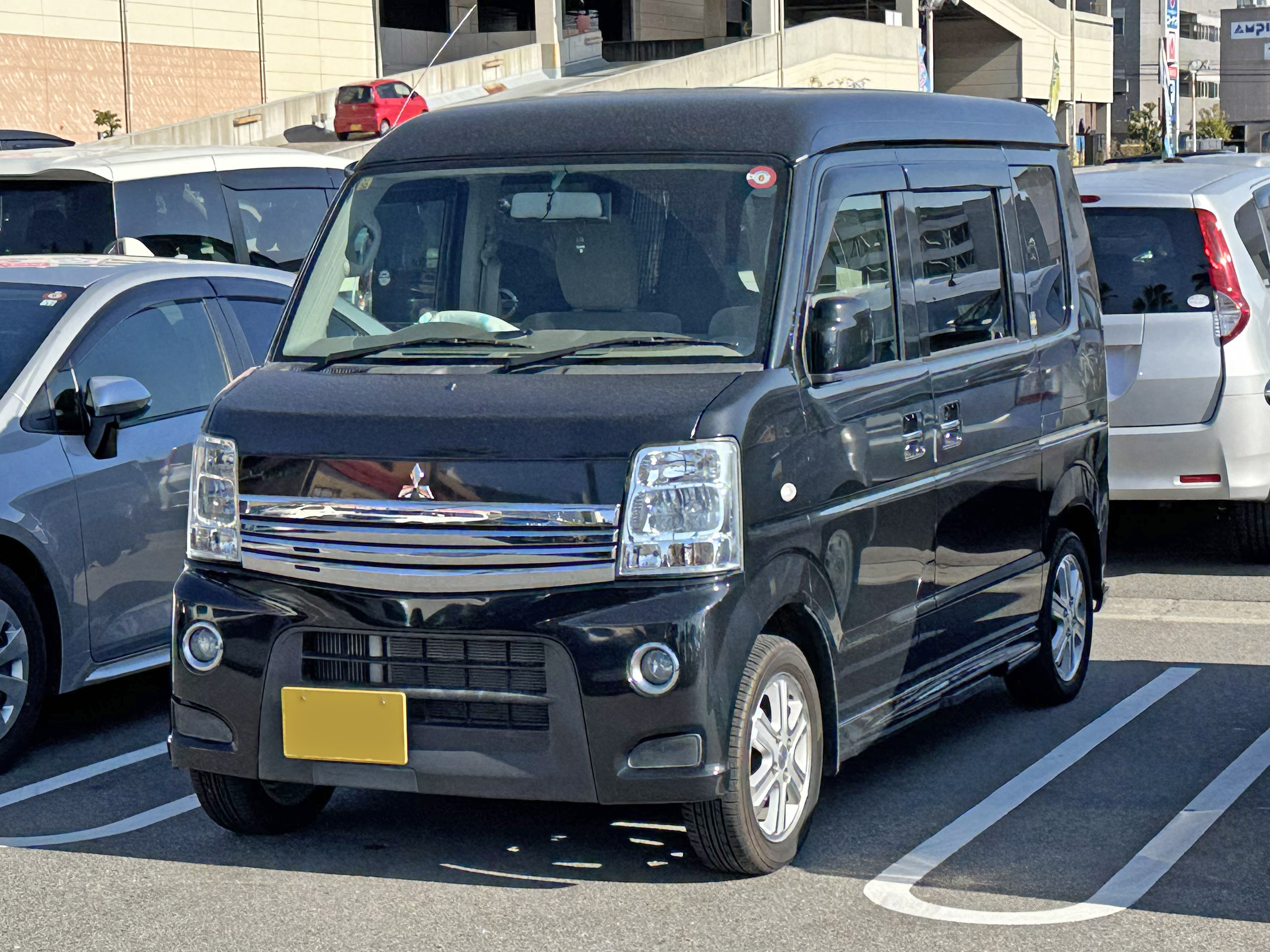
Second generation Mitsubishi Town Box G Special (DS64W)

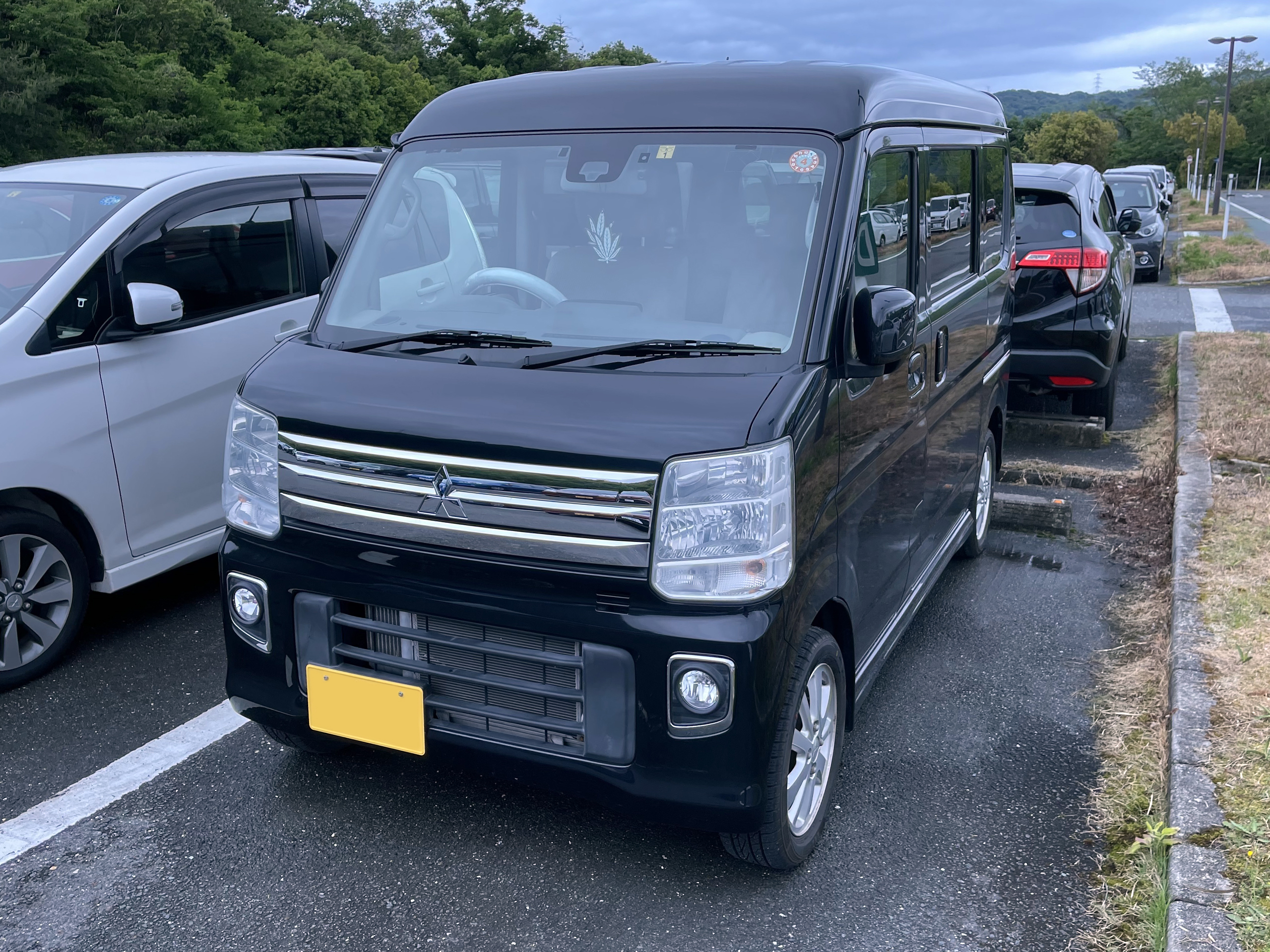
Third generation Mitsubishi Town Box G Special (DS17W)

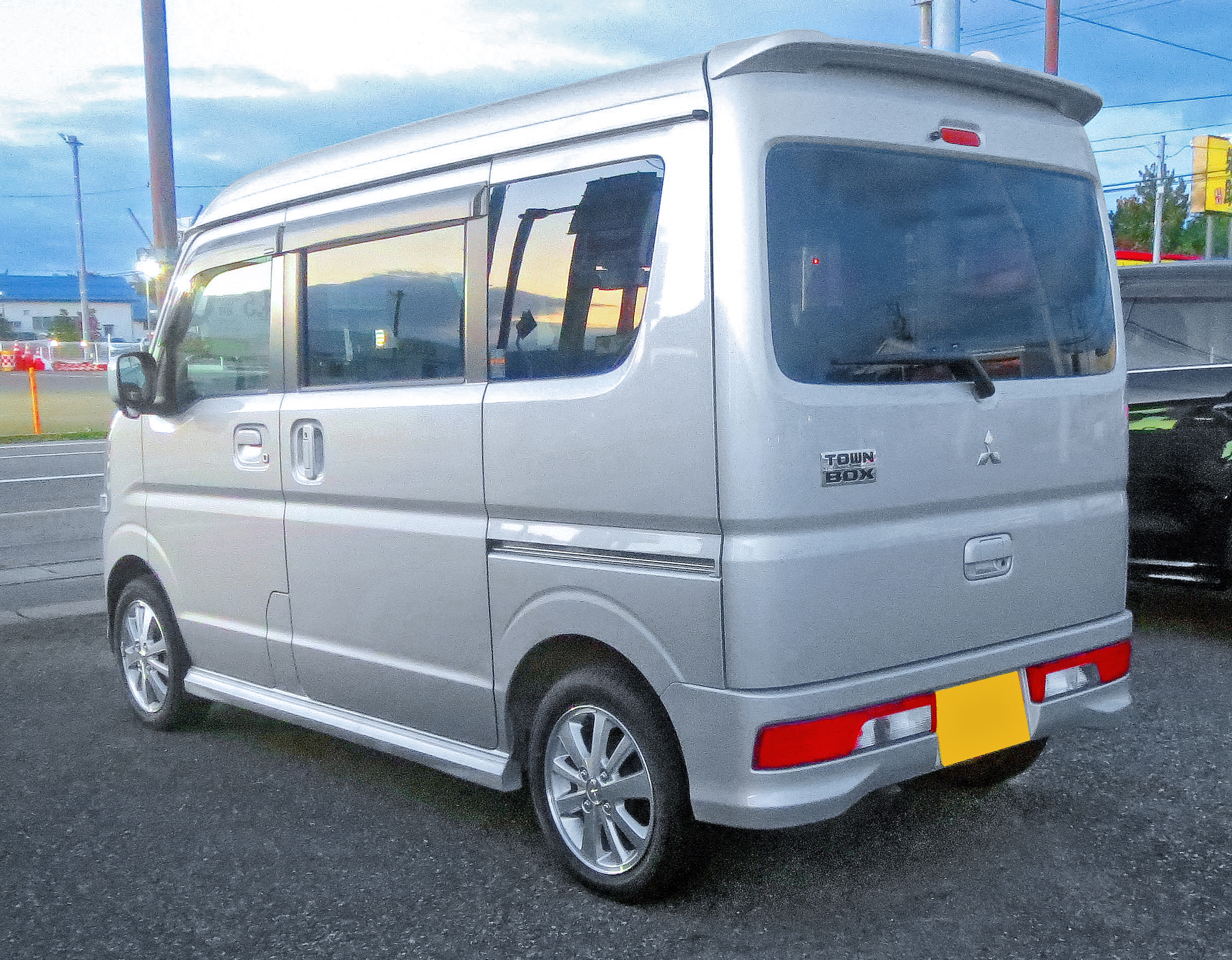
Third generation Mitsubishi Town Box G 4WD (DS17W; rear)

== Annual production and sales ==
Year	Production	Domestic sales	Export sales
1998	2,261	n/a	
1999	14,421; 3,616 (Wide)	14,948; 3,386 (Wide)	2; 1
2000	8,953; 1,441 (Wide/Juara)	8,772; 809 (Wide)	– 664 (Juara)
2001	6,662; 2,939 (Wide/Juara)	7,357; 79 (Wide)	420; 2,640 (Juara)
2002	4,949	5,170	–
2003	5,561	5,430	–
2004	4,262	4,201	–
2005	4,143	4,171	–
2006	3,357	3,649	–
2007	10,105	3,696	–
2008	8,241	3,162	–

(Source: Facts & Figures 2009, Mitsubishi Motors website)
