= Mitsubishi Toppo =

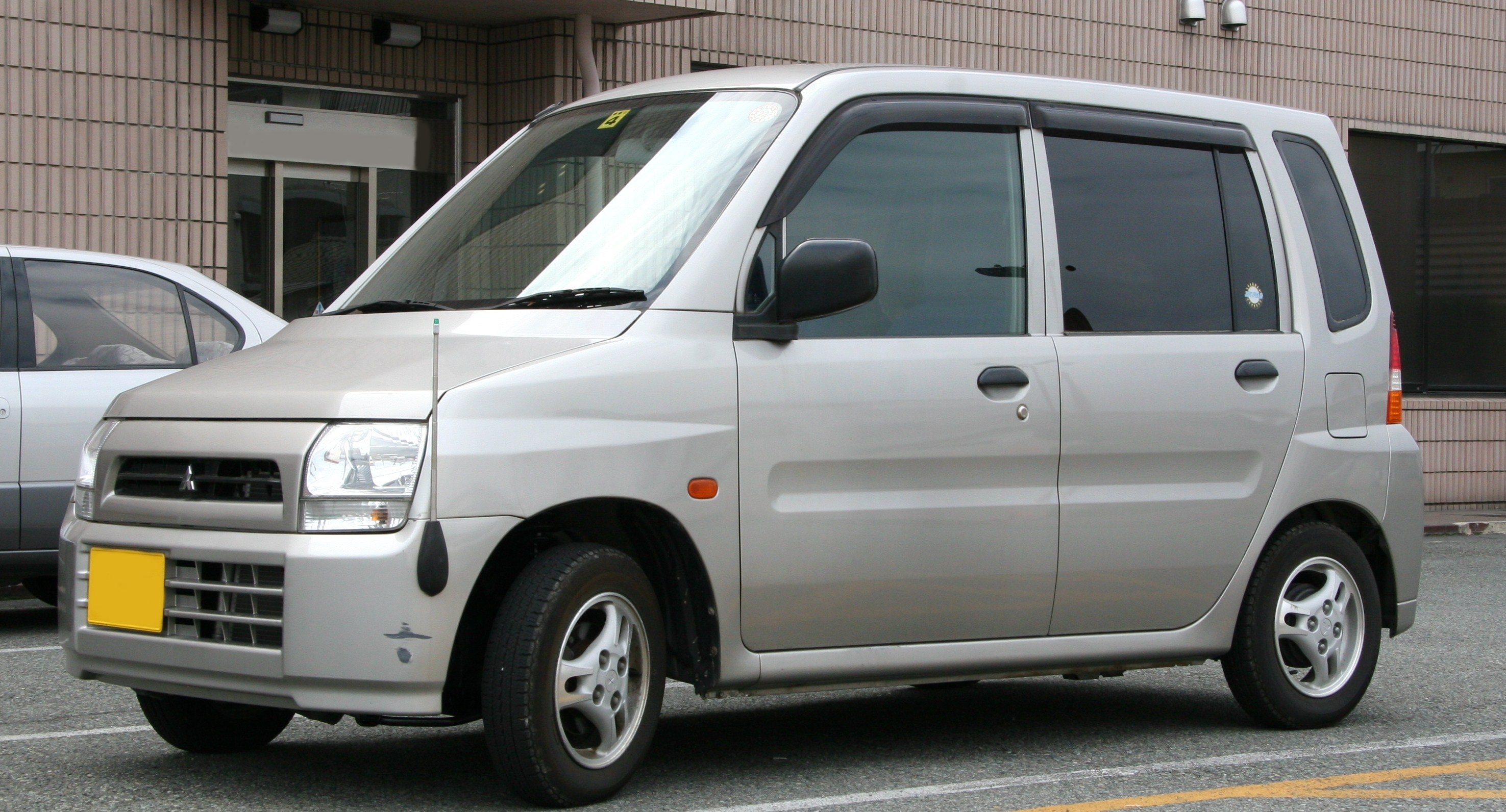

Overview
- Manufacturer: Mitsubishi Motors
- Also called: Mitsubishi Minica Toppo; Mitsubishi Toppo BJ
- Production: 1990–2004; 2008–2013
- Assembly: Mizushima plant, Kurashiki, Okayama, Japan

Body and chassis
- Class: Kei car; Mini MPV (Toppo BJ Wide)
- Layout: Front-engine, front-/four-wheel drive
- Related: Mitsubishi Minica

Chronology
- Successor: Mitsubishi eK Space

The Mitsubishi Toppo (Japanese: 三菱・トッポ) is a light recreational vehicle (RV) produced by Mitsubishi Motors from 1990 until 2004 and then from 2008 until 2013. The original version was derived from their Minica kei car and the first two generations were called the Minica Toppo. The name is a portmanteau of the English "top" (roof) and the Japanese "noppo" (lanky).

Originally named the Mitsubishi Minica Toppo, a retro-styled variant was introduced in 1996 called the Mitsubishi Minica Toppo Town Bee. In 1998 a new generation was launched; now referred to as the Mitsubishi Toppo BJ ("Big Joy"). A larger derivative, the Mitsubishi Toppo BJ Wide was introduced in 1999. The model was replaced by the new eK in 2001, although it was sold alongside the eK until being discontinued in 2004. The Toppo was reintroduced in 2008; now referred to simply as the Mitsubishi Toppo. In Japan, it was sold at a specific retail chain called Galant Shop.

== Minica Toppo (first generation) ==
Mitsubishi Minica Toppo
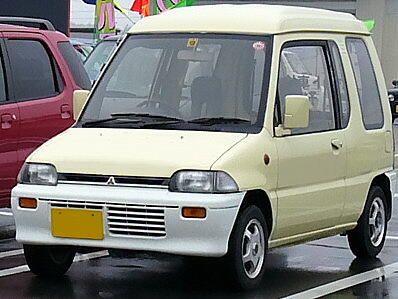

Overview
- Production: 1990–1993

Body and chassis
- Related: Mitsubishi Minica

Powertrain
- Engine: 657 cc 3G83 I3; 657 cc 3G83 DOHC 15v I3; 657 cc 3G83T turbo DOHC 15v I3
- Transmission: 4/5-speed manual; 3/4-speed automatic

Dimensions
- Wheelbase: 2,260 mm (89.0 in)
- Length: 3,255 mm (128.1 in) (1990-1992); 3,295 mm (129.7 in) (1992-1993)
- Width: 1,395 mm (54.9 in)
- Height: 1,695–1,745 mm (66.7–68.7 in)
- Curb weight: 620–760 kg (1,370–1,680 lb)

Based on the Minica, the tall three-door MPV model was introduced in February 1990. While Kei car standards had been altered for 1990, allowing for a 10 cm (3.9 in) increase in length and an increase in displacement to 660 cc, the Toppo, being developed before the new regulations were finalized, was unable to take full advantage of these and ended up 4 cm (1.6 in) shorter than other kei cars. This was rectified along with a minor facelift in January 1992. The Minica Toppo only ever received the new 657 cc 3G83 engine, with optional four-wheel drive. The Minica Toppo was available both as a commercial vehicle and as a better equipped passenger model. The car's body is asymmetric, with the left (offside) door being longer than the driver's side door to provide better entry to the rear seat from the safer side of the car.

The most basic "Toppo C" was a strict two-seater with blanked out rear side windows, equipped with a four-speed manual and a minimum of equipment. In the original commercial vehicle lineup, the C was accompanied by the U, U2, and the four-wheel drive U2-4 models. The introductory passenger version lineup started with the lowest priced B, followed by the Q, the Q2, and the four-wheel drive Q2-4.

Model codes are H22A/H27A for the passenger models, H22V/H27V for van models. H22 is front-wheel drive, H27 is four-wheel drive. Commercial use models and the lower-end passenger versions received a carburetted SOHC engine with 40 PS (29 kW) at 6000 rpm. Van models were uncatalyzed until May 1991. Passenger versions were also offered with a carbureted DOHC 15-valve engine (5 valves per cylinder) with 46 PS (34 kW) at 7000 rpm or a fuel injected variant with 52 PS (38 kW) at 7500 rpm. After the January 1992 facelift, the turbocharged Minica Toppo Qt Canvas Top was added, with 64 PS (47 kW) at 7000 rpm from the same engine used in the sporty Minica Dangan ZZ.

In late October 1990, the Minica Toppo Q坊 (Q-Bo) special edition based on the Toppo Q2 was released; 2,000 units went on sale. Aside from various special equipment such as power steering, power windows, a rooftop spoiler, fog lamps, and special interior fabrics, the Q坊 received two-tone paint in two different combinations: San Marino Yellow with Sophia White roof, or Ivy Green with a Pearl White roof. The Q坊 became a recurring special edition, being re-released with minor alterations in August 1991 (now based on the better equipped Q3 and with a 6-disc CD changer), August 1992, and ultimately in May 1993. The last edition Q坊 was also available with four-wheel drive. Another special edition was the Minica Toppo Flower Express of March 1991, a two-seater van with blanked rear side windows especially aimed at florists.

In January 1992, the Toppo (as well as the Minica) was modified, mainly to meet new safety regulations. The passenger car models benefitted from side impact protection in the doors, steering wheel locks, seat belt reminders, non-asbestos gaskets, and more. Some models received 3-point belts in the rear seats as well, not a standard item in kei cars until the end of the decade. The grille, bumpers, headlights, and seat fabrics were new. The Toppo also received an opening rear gate window and a protrusion on the rear bumper which served as a step. The new Canvas Top was available on the turbocharged Qt as well as on the naturally aspirated Qc.

Production of the Minica Toppo ended in September 1993 as a new version was introduced; however, the new model continued to use the rear bodywork of the first Minica Toppo coupled with the new front and underpinnings of the new seventh generation Minica, effectively making it a thorough facelift.

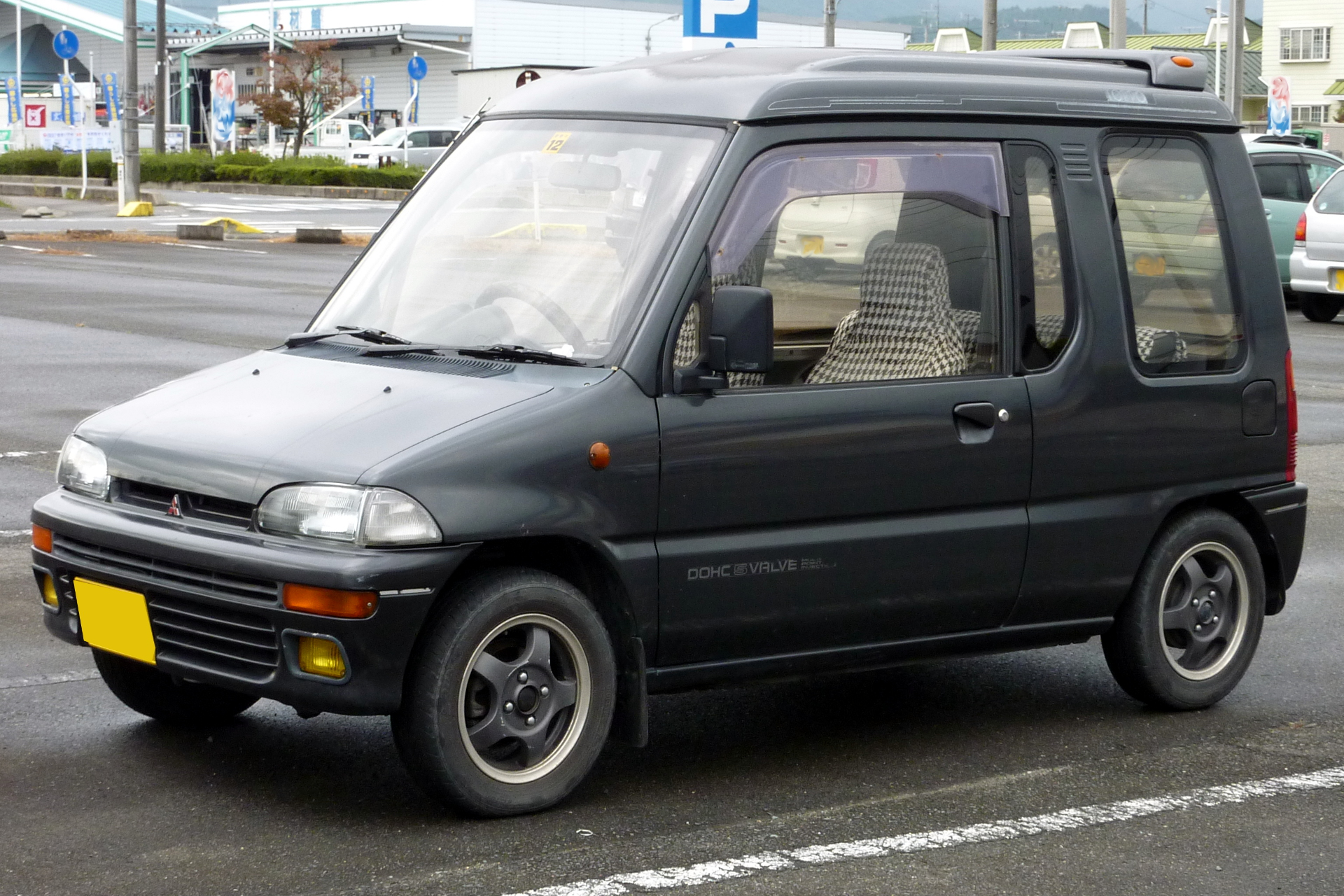
First generation Mitsubishi Minica Toppo (facelift)

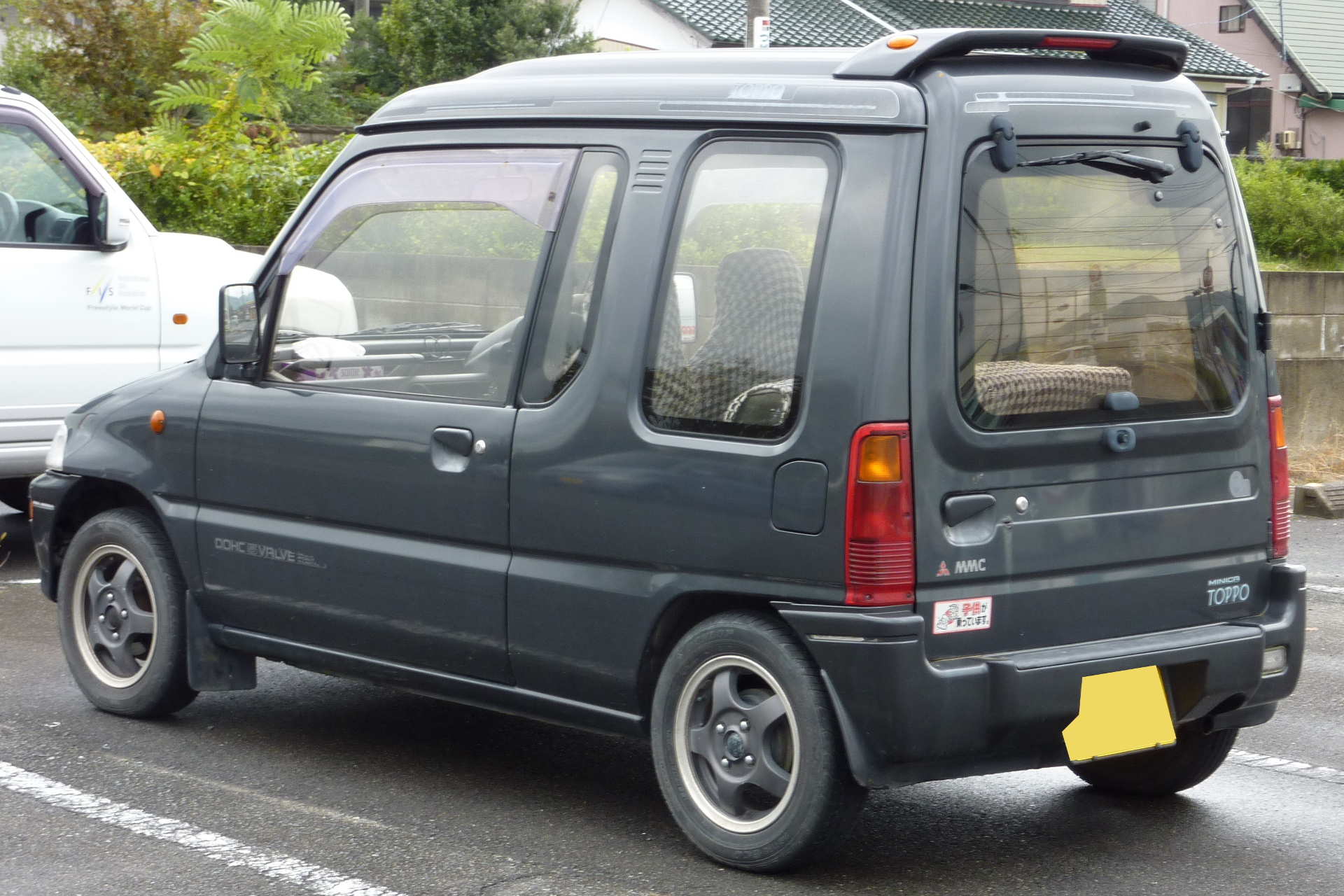
Rear view of the facelift Minica Toppo; note protrusion in rear bumper.

== Minica Toppo (second generation) ==
Mitsubishi Minica Toppo
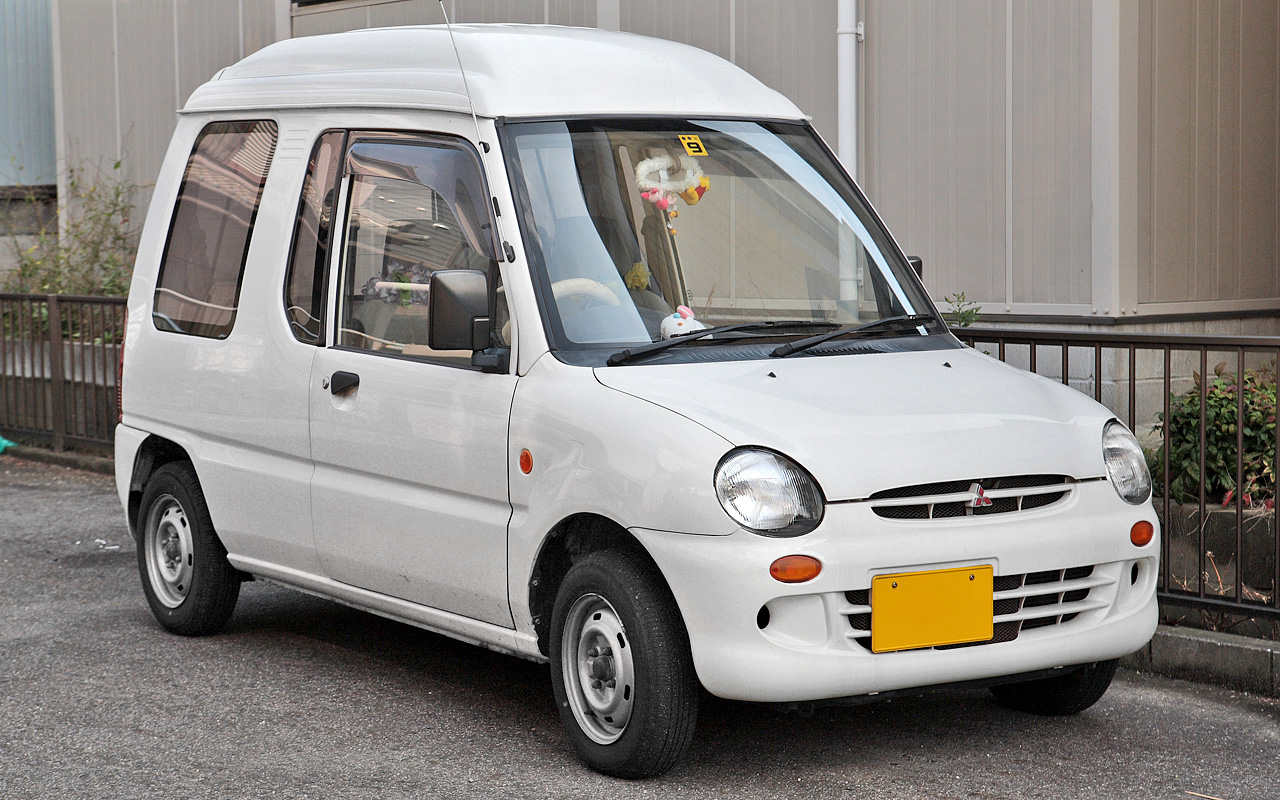

Overview
- Production: 1993–2010

Body and chassis
- Related: Mitsubishi Minica

Powertrain
- Engine: 657 cc 3G83 I3; 657 cc 4A30 I3
- Transmission: 4/5-speed manual; 3/4-speed automatic

Dimensions
- Wheelbase: 2,280 mm (89.8 in)
- Length: 3,295 mm (129.7 in)
- Width: 1,395 mm (54.9 in)
- Height: 1,695–1,795 mm (66.7–70.7 in)
- Curb weight: 640–790 kg (1,410–1,740 lb)

The second generation Minica Toppo was sold from 1993 to 1998. It was essentially a thorough facelift of the short-lived first generation model, stretched out to take full advantage of the new kei class regulations. The new front end was the same as that of the new Minica, while the passenger compartment was largely unchanged, inside and out.

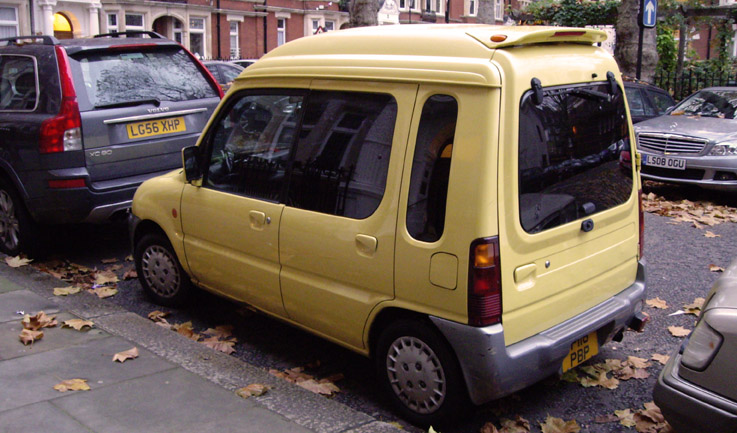
Mitsubishi Minica Toppo (rear)

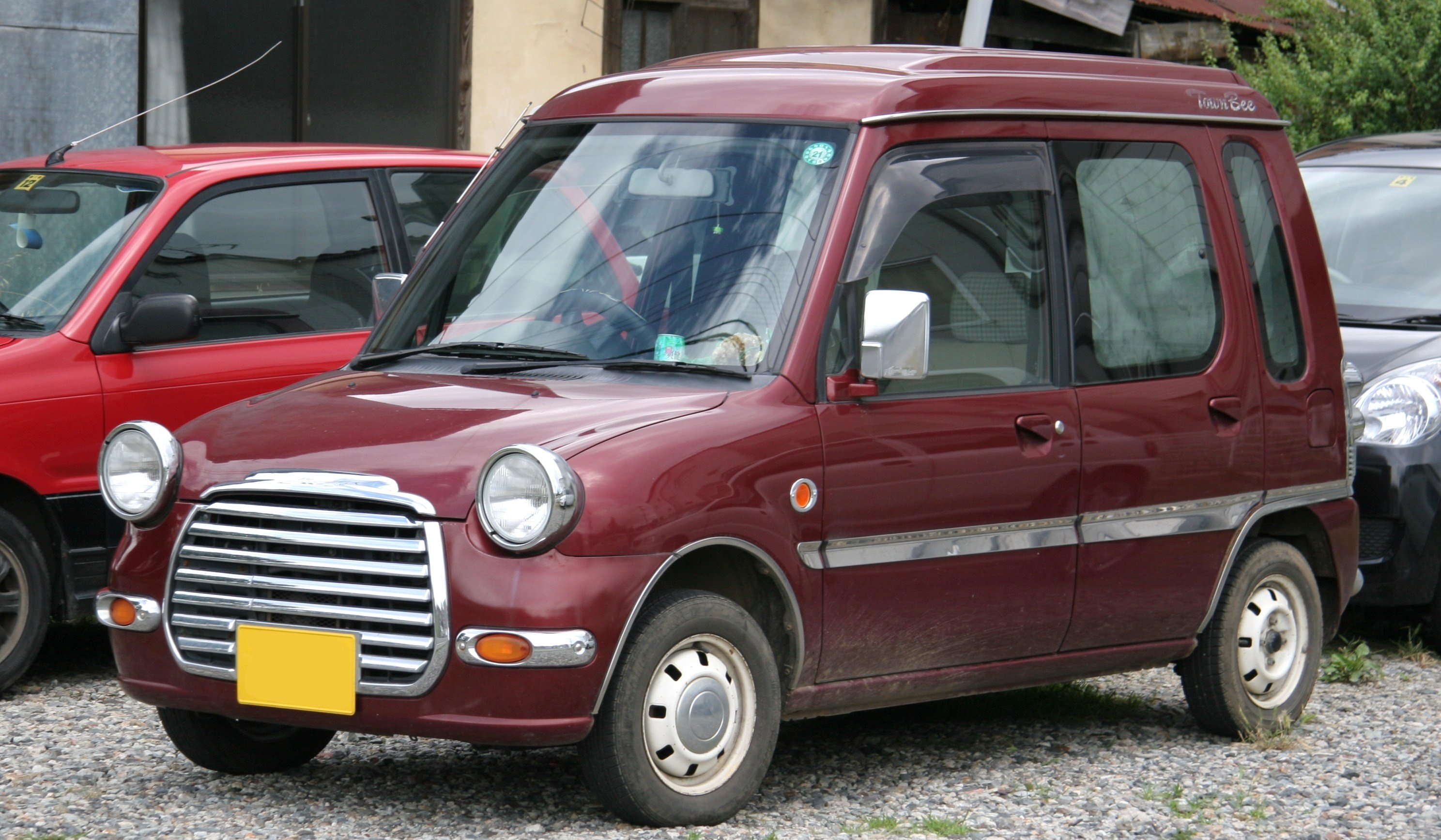
Mitsubishi Minica Toppo Town Bee (Second generation Toppo)

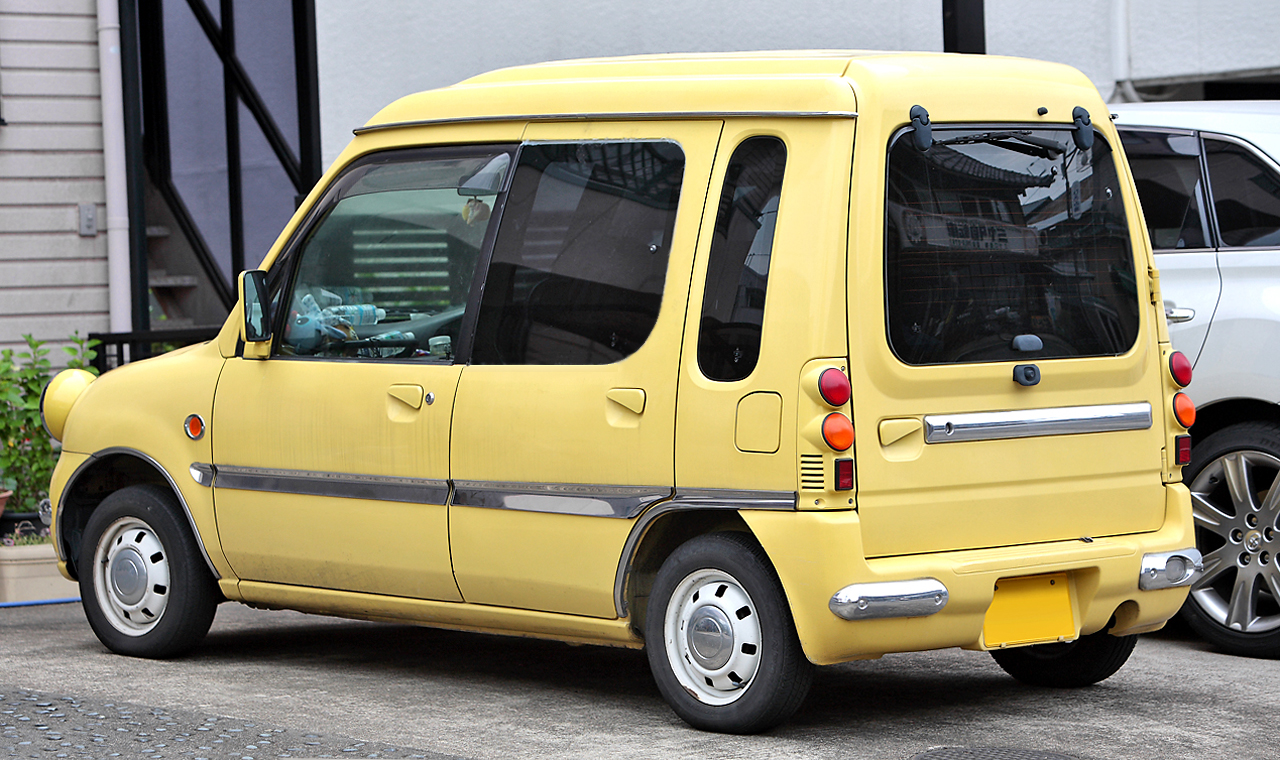
Mitsubishi Minica Toppo Town Bee rear view (Second generation Toppo)

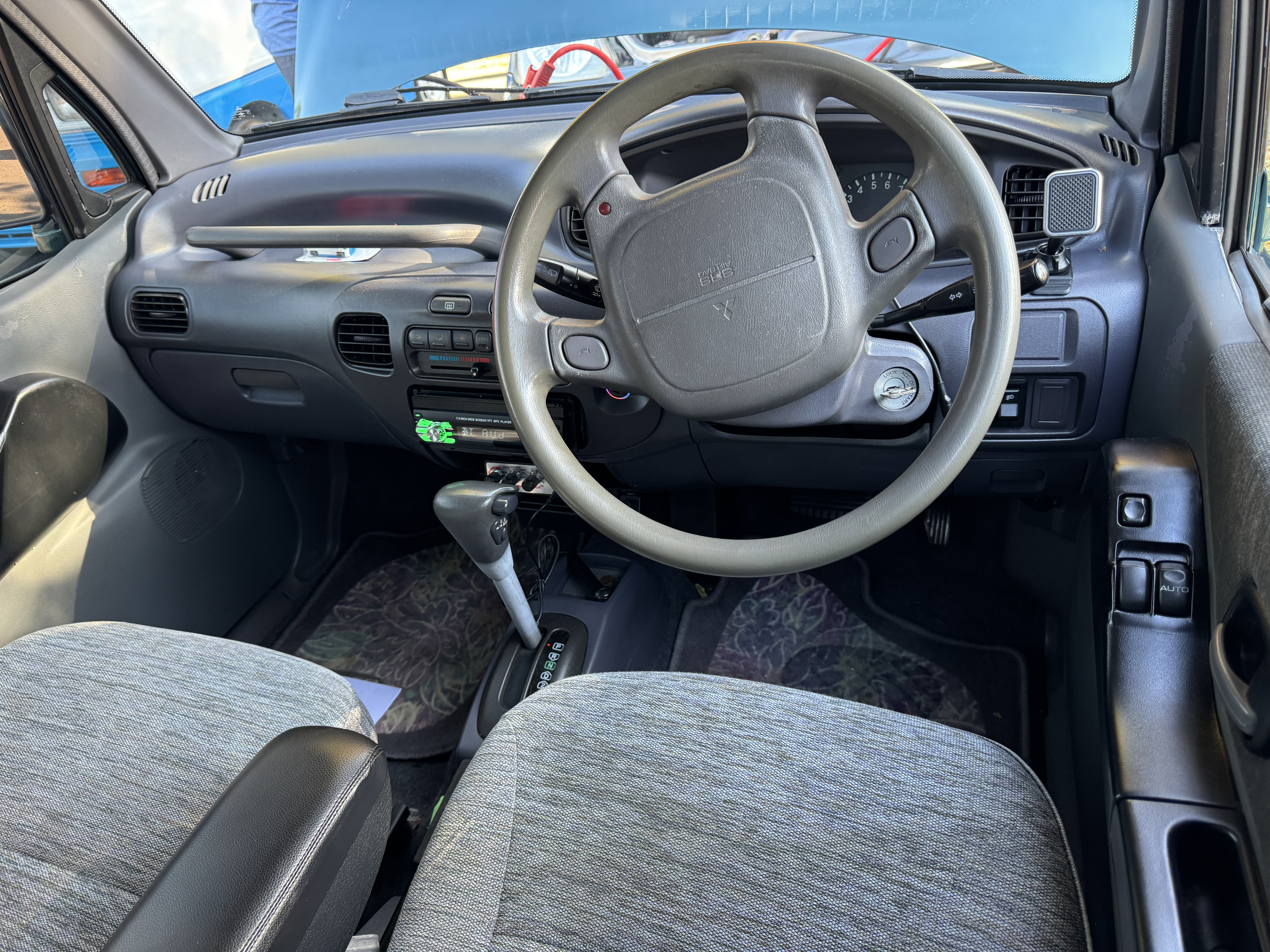
Interior of a Toppo RT

== Toppo BJ (third generation) ==
Mitsubishi Minica Toppo (H41/H42/H46/H47/H48)
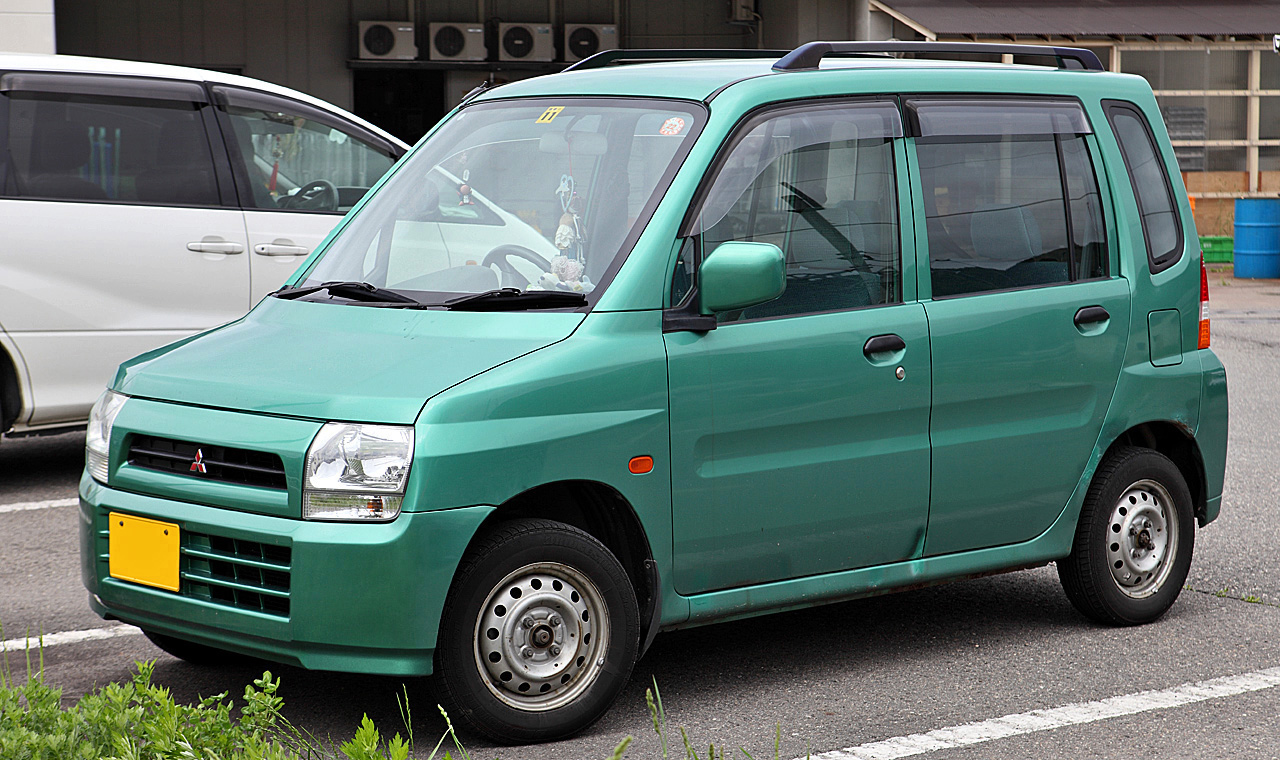

Overview
- Production: 1998–2004; 1999–2001 (BJ Wide)

Body and chassis
- Related: Mitsubishi Minica; Mitsubishi Pistachio; Hafei Lobo

Powertrain
- Engine: 657 cc 3G83 SOHC/DOHC I3; 659 cc 4A30 SOHC/DOHC I4; 1094 cc 4A31 SOHC I4
- Transmission: 4/5-speed manual; 3/4-speed automatic

Dimensions
- Wheelbase: 2,340 mm (92.1 in)
- Length: 3,395 mm (133.7 in) (1990-1992); 3,540 mm (139.4 in) (BJ Wide)
- Width: 1,475 mm (58.1 in); 1,540 mm (60.6 in) (BJ Wide)
- Height: 1,695 mm (66.7 in); 1,710 mm (67.3 in) (BJ Wide)
- Curb weight: 790–900 kg (1,742–1,984 lb); 870–920 kg (1,918–2,028 lb) (BJ Wide)

The third generation Toppo was sold from October 1998 to 2004.

A non-kei version with enlarged bumpers, a 1.1-litre engine, and five seats instead of four, the Toppo BJ Wide, was also produced from January 1999 until March 2001.

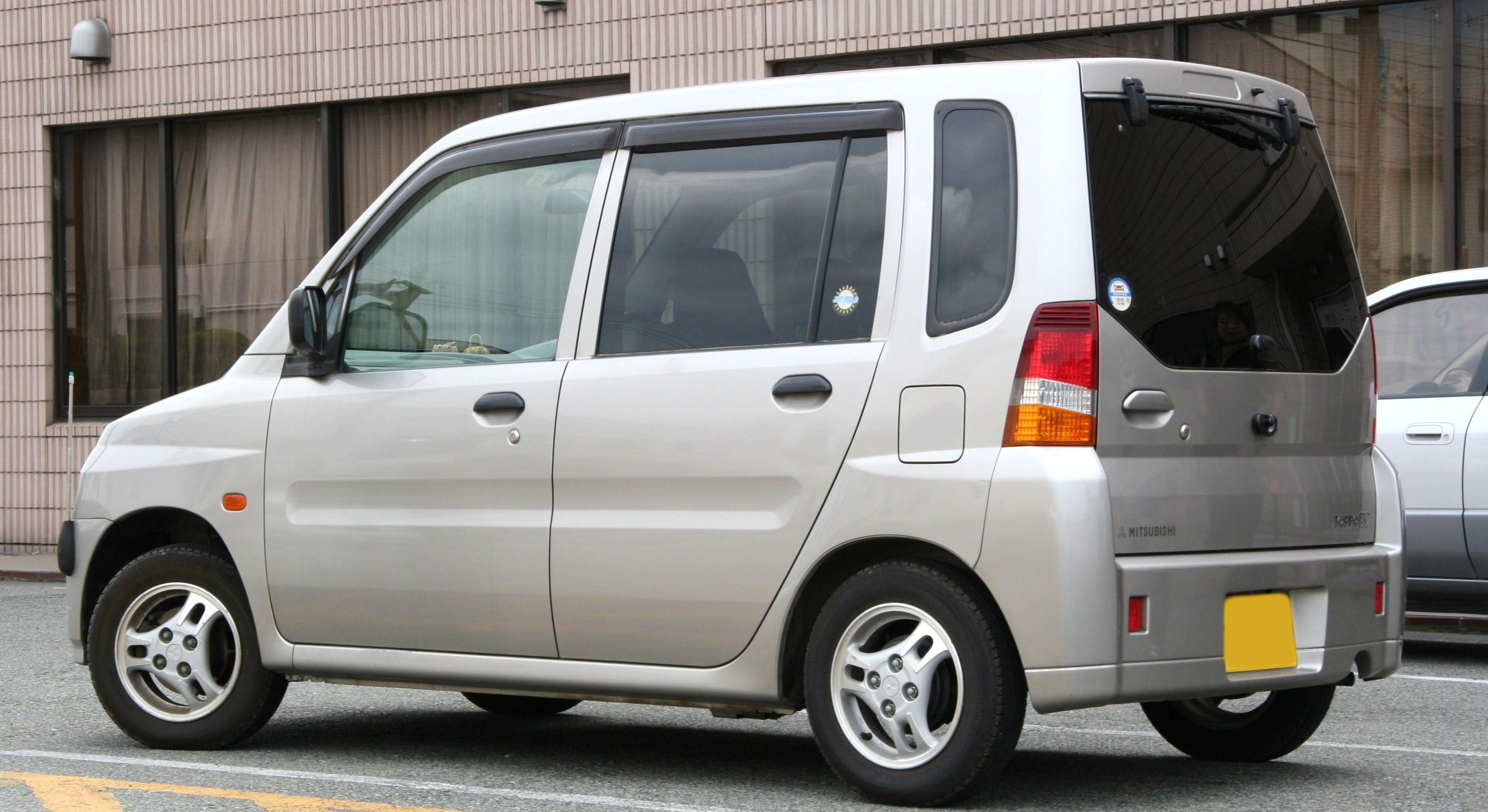
1999 Mitsubishi Toppo BJ (rear)

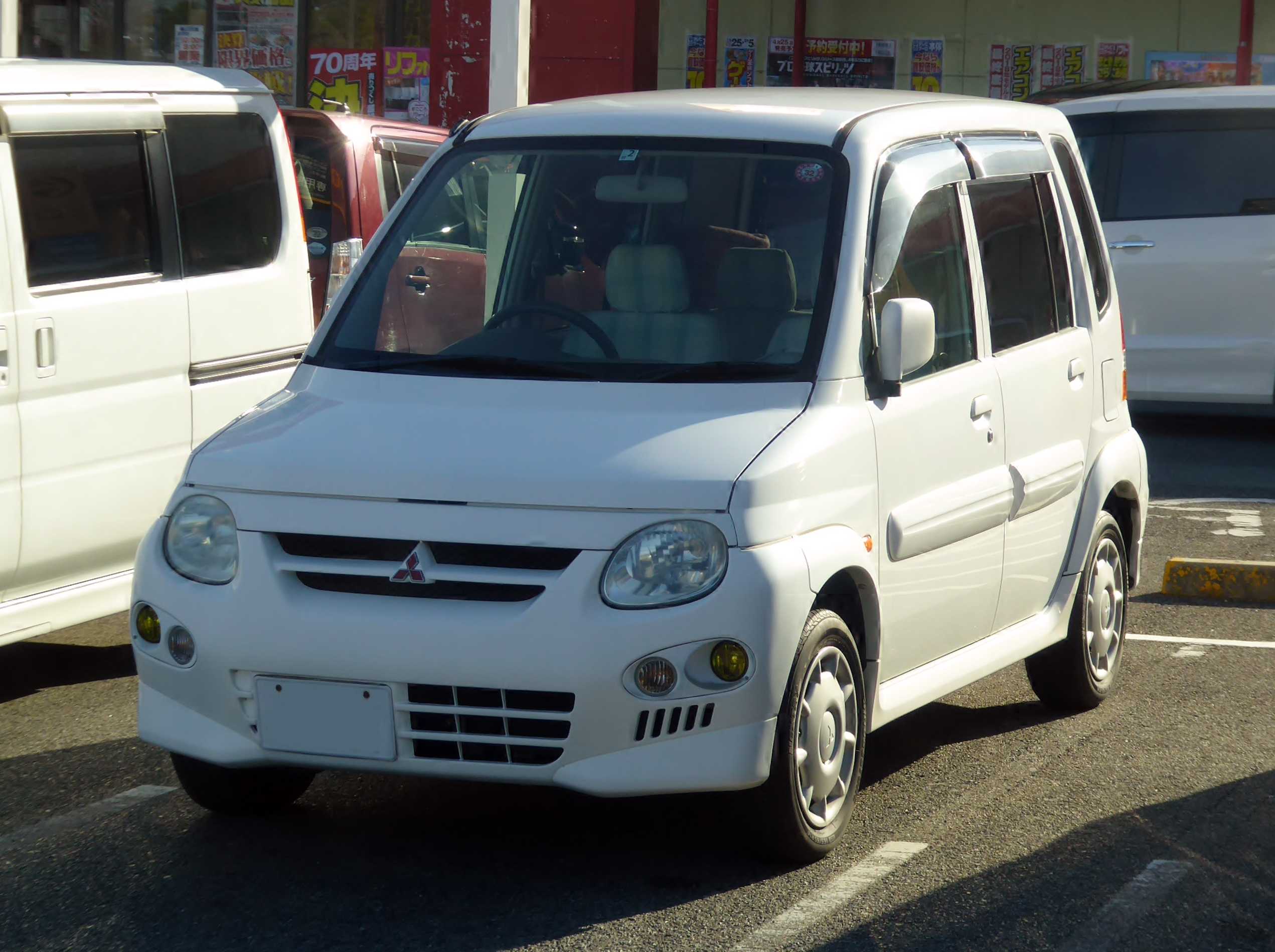
1999–2001 Mitsubishi Toppo BJ Wide

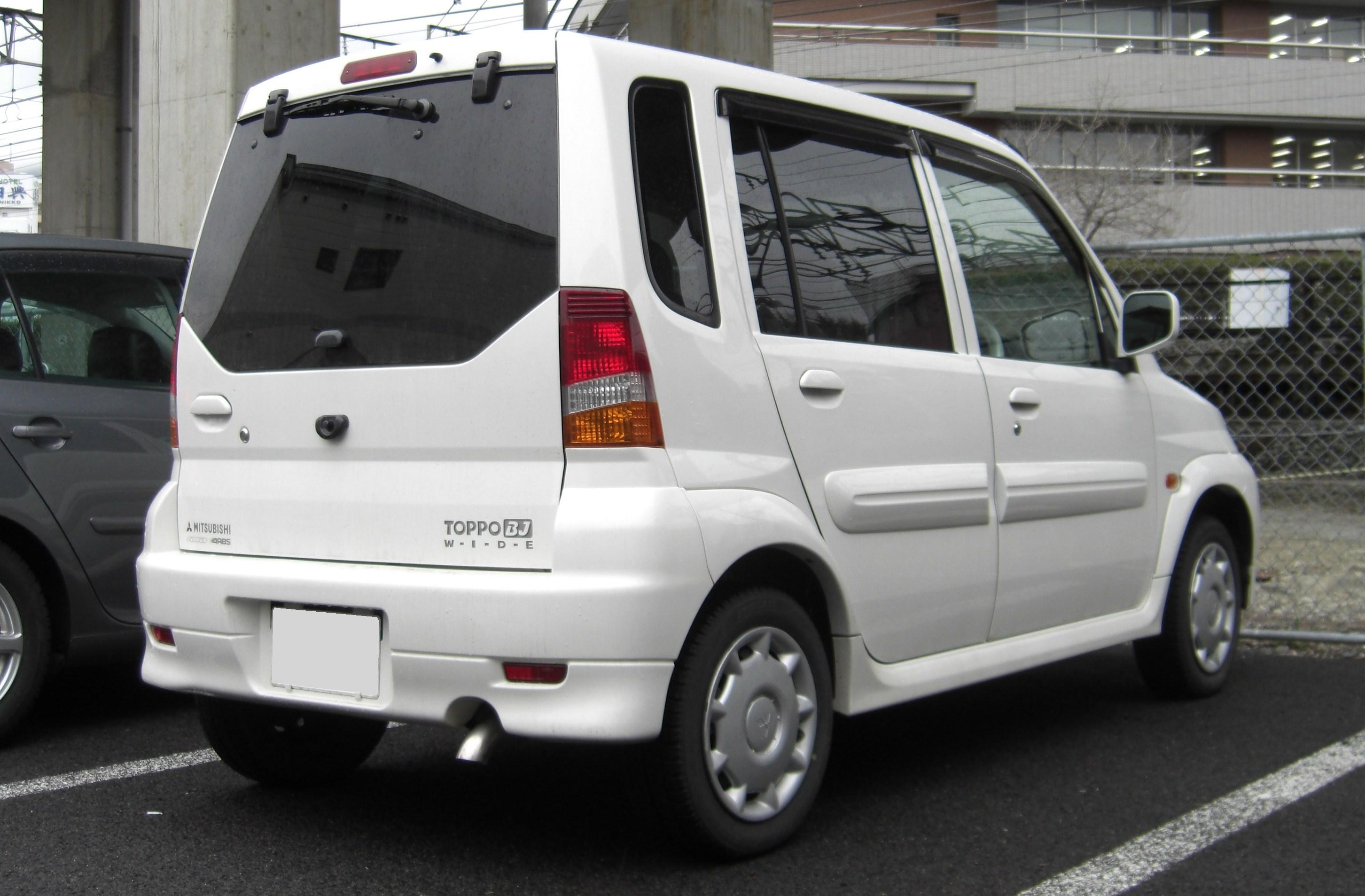
Mitsubishi Toppo BJ Wide (rear)

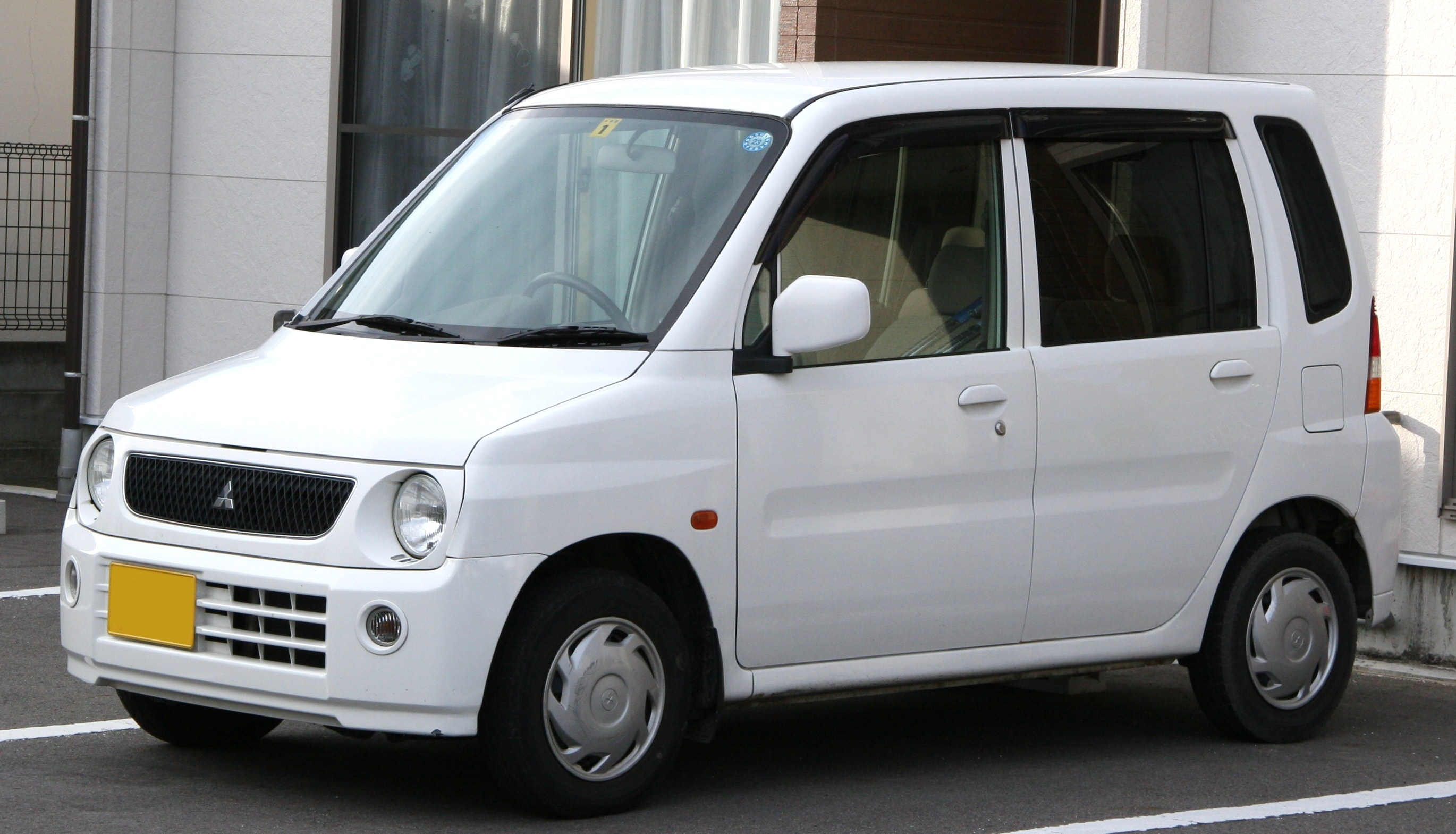
2001 Mitsubishi Toppo BJ "Guppy" trim package

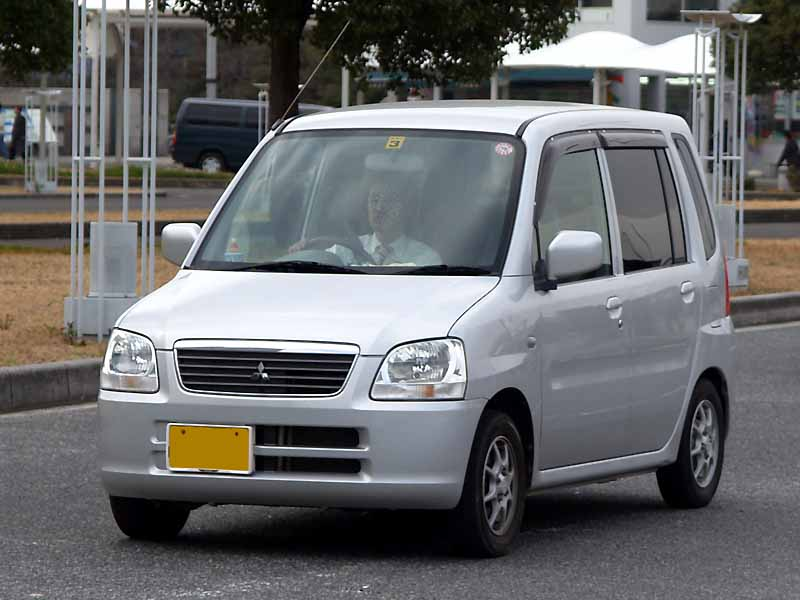
Mitsubishi Toppo H41A

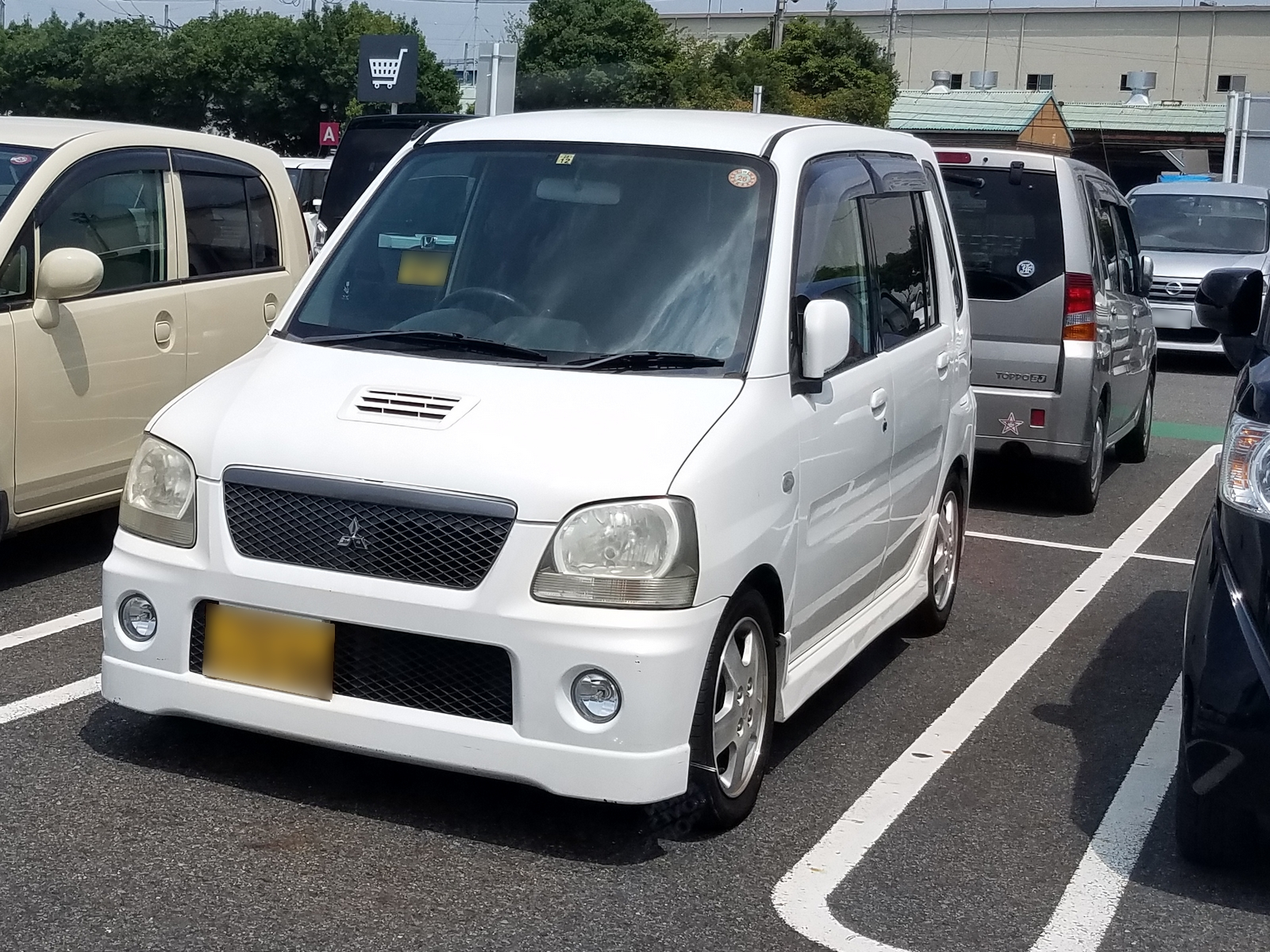
Mitsubishi Toppo H41A R

== Toppo (fourth generation) ==
Mitsubishi Minica Toppo
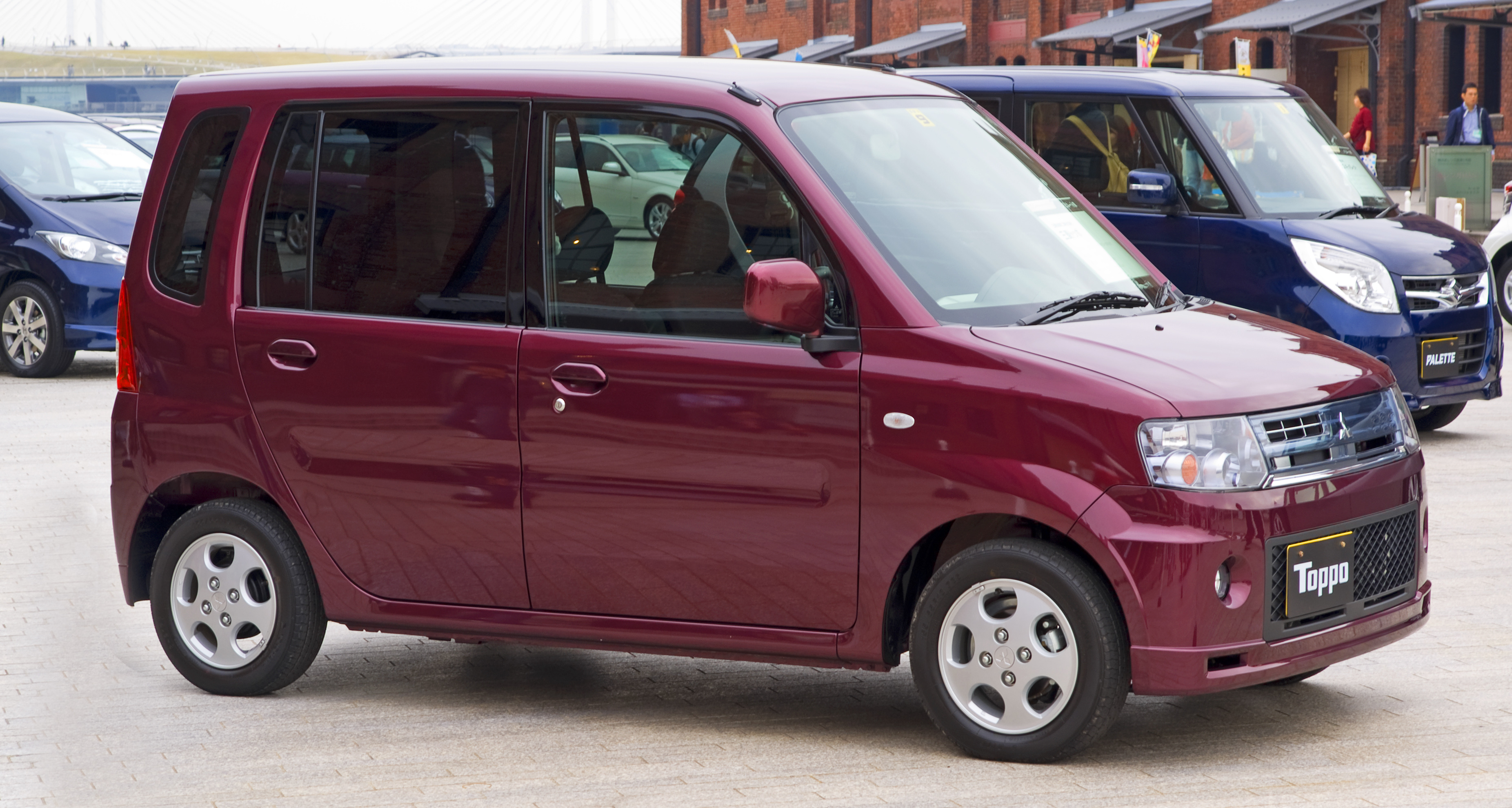

Overview
- Production: September 2008– June 2013

Body and chassis
- Related: Mitsubishi Minica; Mitsubishi eK Wagon

Powertrain
- Engine: 657 cc 3G83 I3
- Transmission: 3/4-speed automatic

Dimensions
- Wheelbase: 2,340 mm (92.1 in)
- Length: 3,395 mm (133.7 in)
- Width: 1,475 mm (58.1 in)
- Height: 1,680–1,700 mm (66.1–66.9 in)
- Curb weight: 830–940 kg (1,830–2,072 lb)

The fourth generation Toppo (H82A) was sold from 17 September 2008 and returned to using the Toppo nameplate. It used the door panels and many other sheet metal pieces from the third generation, on the underpinnings of the second generation eK Wagon with which it shared the H82 model code.

The initial lineup started with the basic S and M, which mainly differ in that the S was the only Toppo model of this generation to be fitted with a three-speed automatic transmission - all other variants were four-speed automatics. The S was also the only model to be fitted with black door mirrors and handles, until it was discontinued in August 2010. The S and M models have regular halogen headlights and no black trim on the door frames, unlike the better equipped G which also received high-intensity discharge headlights and a digital speedometer incorporating a tachometer (the last being introduced in August 2010). The sportier T model has a turbocharged engine; exterior differences are limited to having 14-inch alloy wheels as standard equipment, rather than the 13-inch steel wheels with plastic wheel covers used on all naturally aspirated models. The Toppo T also has a somewhat lower, sport suspension incorporating a front stabilizer. All models share the clear acrylic, asymmetrical front grille and deep sideskirts.

There were also special editions including the Limited, the M Navi Edition, Joyfield, and Marble Edition. The Roadest G and Roadest T were part of the regular lineup; they differ by having a chromed front grille, deeper skirts and air dams, a rear roof spoiler, and chromed surrounds on the taillights.

Production ceased in June 2013 and the nameplate was retired.

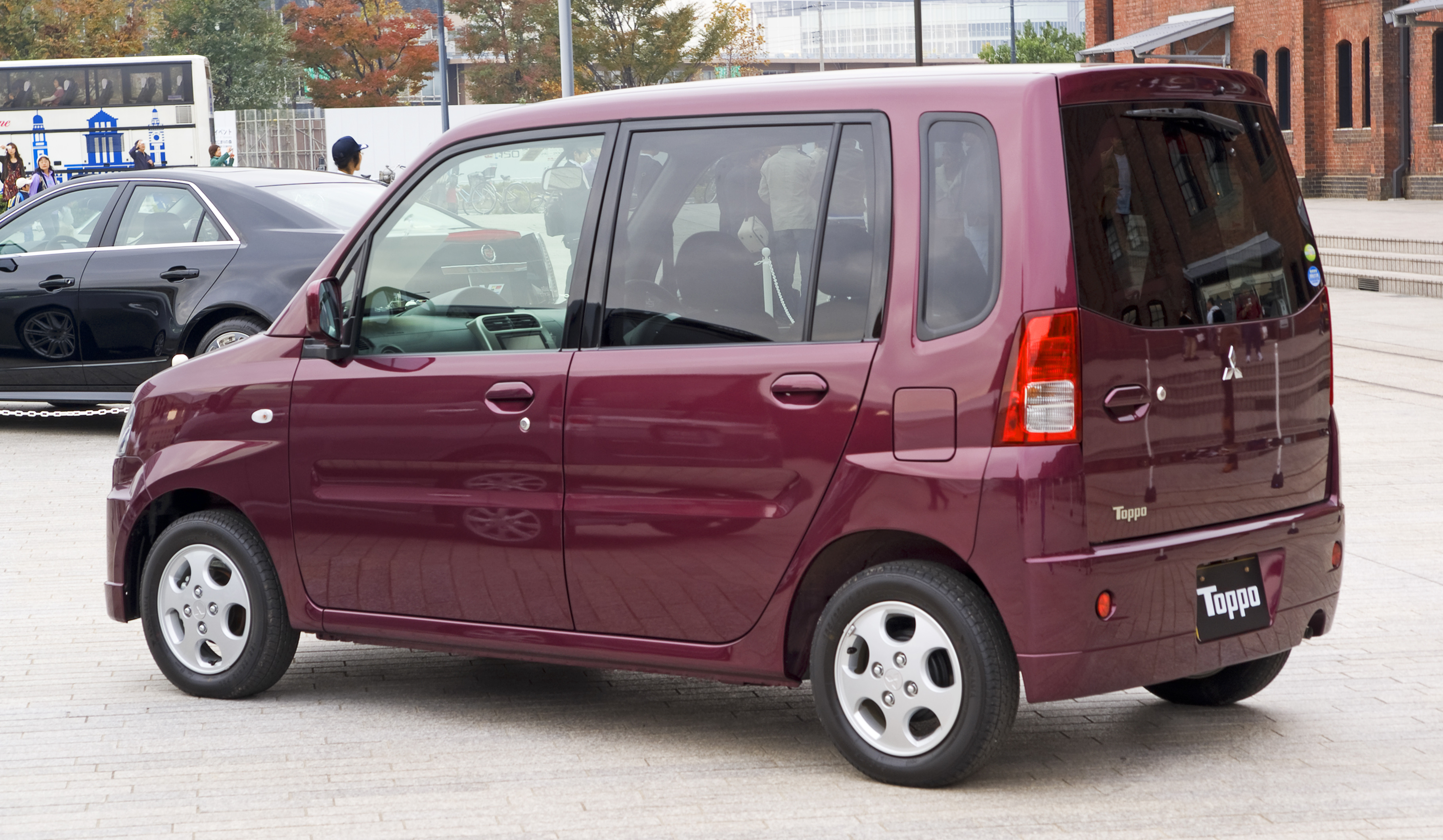
2008 Mitsubishi Toppo rear
