= Automotive molding =

Automotive design feature

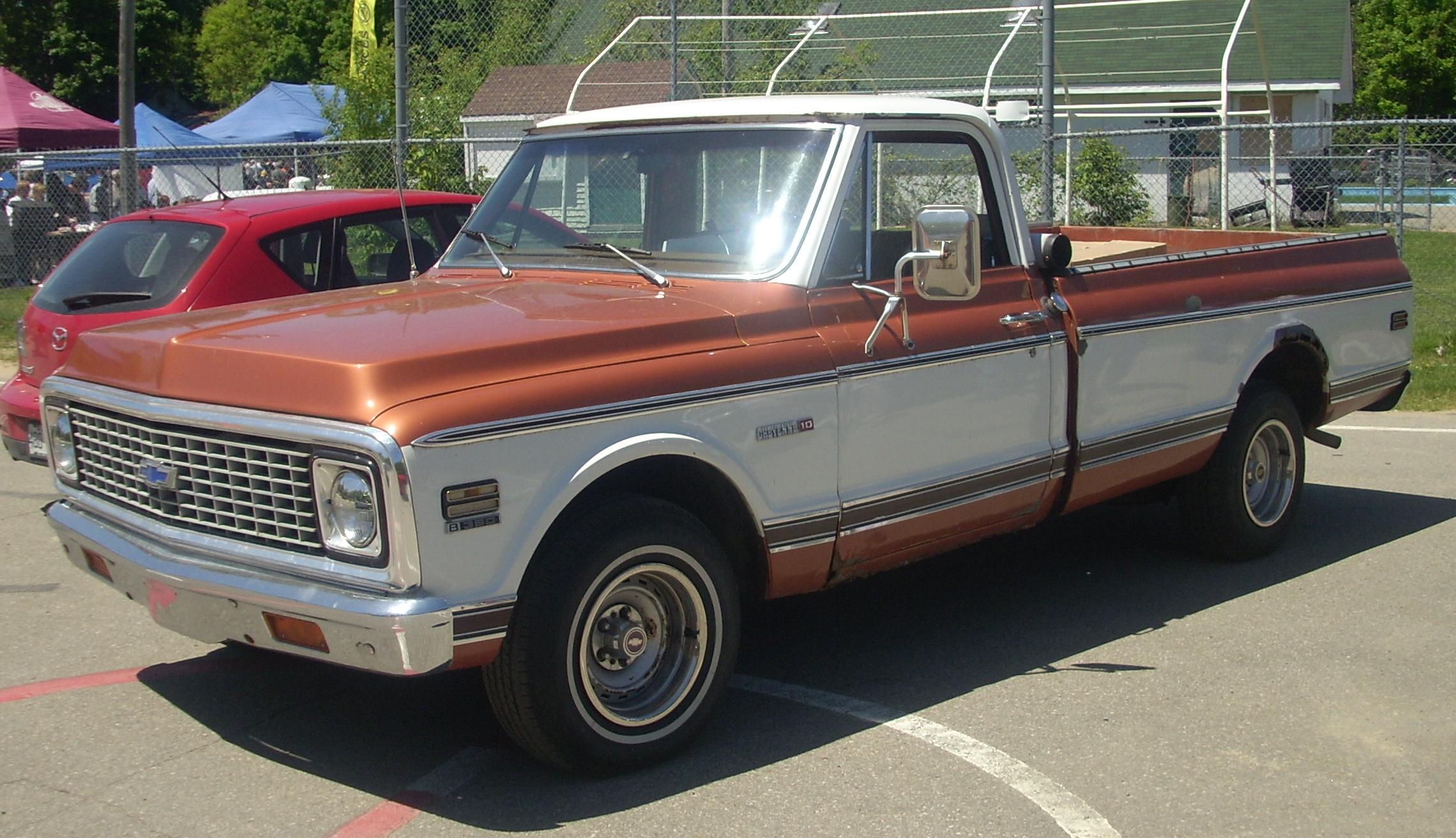
Chevrolet C/K with side body moulding

Automotive moulding or car body moulding are decorative and protective mouldings on the body of a car. The term applies both to the detail and the material.

Car mouldings include side body moulding, lower body moulding, door moldings, window mouldings, footrest moulding, and mudflaps. They are often found in services in association with car mats and related products.

Various car mouldings must have high scratch resistance, weather resistance and gloss to match the car body. A common material which provides these is polyvinyl chloride.
