= Mitsubishi 4A3 engine =

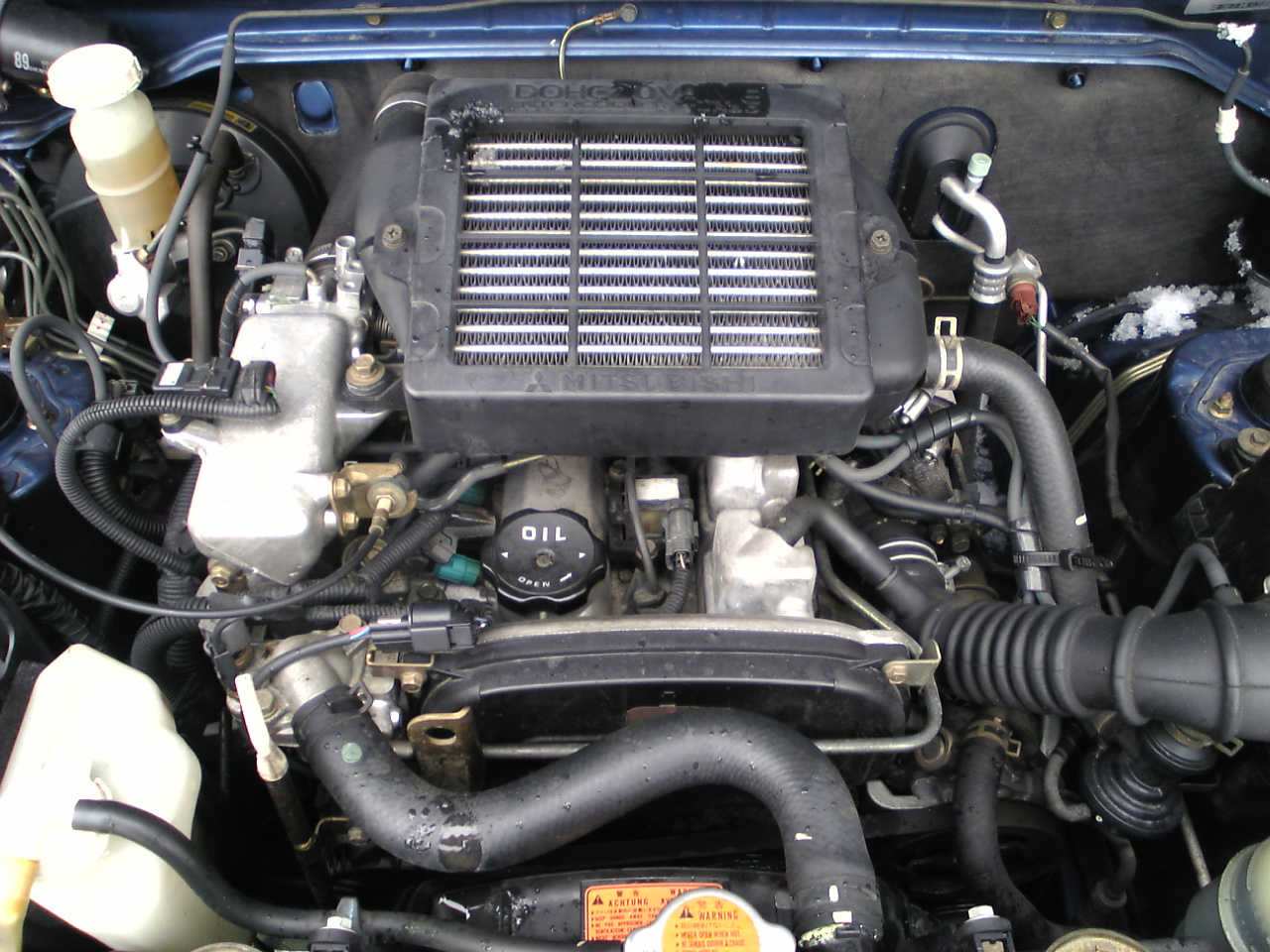

Overview
- Manufacturer: Mitsubishi Motors
- Production: 1993–2013

Layout
- Configuration: Inline-four
- Displacement: 0.7–1.1 L (659–1,094 cc)
- Cylinder bore: 60 mm (2.36 in); 66 mm (2.60 in)
- Piston stroke: 58.3 mm (2.30 in); 80 mm (3.15 in)
- Cylinder block material: Cast iron
- Cylinder head material: Aluminium
- Valvetrain: SOHC 4 valves x cyl. DOHC 5 valves x cyl.
- Compression ratio: 8.5:1-11.0:1

Combustion
- Turbocharger: available on 4A30 (659 cc)
- Fuel system: Electro carburettor Electronic fuel injection Direct Injection
- Fuel type: Gasoline
- Cooling system: Water-cooled

Output
- Power output: 50–80 PS (37–59 kW)
- Torque output: 56–103 N⋅m (41–76 lb⋅ft)

The Mitsubishi 4A3 engine is a range of alloy-headed inline four-cylinder engines from Mitsubishi Motors, introduced in 1993 in the sixth generation of their Mitsubishi Minica kei car. It shares a 72 mm (2.8 in) bore pitch with the 3G8-series three-cylinder engines, but has a considerably shorter stroke so as to stay beneath the 660 cc limit imposed by the Kei class.

A long-stroke, 1.1 L (1,094 cc) version was made available in 1997 for larger-engined kei derivatives, and was subsequently fitted to the Mitsubishi Pistachio, a limited production car based on the kei class Minica equipped with the company's Automatic Stop-Go (ASG) system for cutting the engine when idling. So equipped, the Pistachio was able to record fuel economy figures of 30 km/L (85 mpg_{‑imp}; 71 mpg_{‑US}).

== 4A30 ==
Displacement — 0.7 L (659 cc)
Bore x Stroke — 60 mm × 58.3 mm (2.36 in × 2.30 in)
Fuel type — Unleaded regular gasoline.

A lean-burn variant, using Mitsubishi's "Vertical Vortex" system, appeared on the new, second-generation Pajero Mini in October 1998. The new engine cut emissions and fuel consumption by about ten percent, in spite of the new model being marginally larger and heavier.

=== 659 cc Electronic carburettor (1993) ===
- Engine type — Inline 4-cylinder SOHC 16v
- Fuel system — Electronic carburettor
- Compression ratio — 10.0:1
- Power — 50 PS (37 kW) at 7500 rpm
- Torque — 56 N⋅m (41 lb⋅ft) at 5500 rpm

=== 659 cc SOHC (1993) ===
- Engine type — Inline 4-cylinder SOHC 16v
- Fuel system — Multipoint ECI
- Compression ratio — 10.0:1
- Power — 55 PS (40 kW) at 7000 rpm
- Torque — 60 N⋅m (6.1 kg⋅m; 44 lb⋅ft) at 5000 rpm

=== 659 cc MVV (1998) ===
- Engine type — Inline 4-cylinder SOHC 16v
- Fuel system — Multipoint ECI, lean burn (MVV)
- Compression ratio — 10.0:1
- Power — 52 PS (38 kW) at 6500 rpm
- Torque — 62 N⋅m (6.3 kg⋅m; 46 lb⋅ft) at 4500 rpm
- Production – 1998–2002

=== 659 cc DOHC 20v turbo (1993) ===
- Engine type — Inline 4-cylinder DOHC 20v
- Fuel system — ECI multiple
- Compression ratio — 8.5:1
- Power — 64 PS (47 kW) at 7500 rpm
- Torque — 100 N⋅m (10.2 kg⋅m; 74 lb⋅ft) at 3500 rpm

== 4A31 ==
Displacement — 1.1 L (1,094 cc)
Bore x Stroke — 66 mm × 80 mm (2.60 in × 3.15 in)
Fuel type — Unleaded regular gasoline

The regular 4A31 engine met Euro 2 or 3 emissions standards, depending on model and year, while the GDI version was capable of Euro 4.

=== 1094 cc SOHC (1997) ===
Engine type
Inline 4-cylinder SOHC 16v
Fuel system
ECI multiple
Compression ratio
9.5:1
Power
Pajero Junior: 80 PS (59 kW) at 6000 rpm
Toppo BJ Wide: 78 PS (57 kW) at 6000 rpm
Town Box Wide: 75 PS (55 kW) at 6000 rpm
Torque
Pajero Junior: 98 N⋅m (72 lb⋅ft) at 4000 rpm
Toppo BJ Wide: 103 N⋅m (76 lb⋅ft) at 4000 rpm
Town Box Wide: 100 N⋅m (74 lb⋅ft) at 4000 rpm

=== 1094 cc GDI (1999) ===
Engine type
Inline 4-cylinder DOHC 16v
Fuel system
GDI Direct Injection
Compression ratio
11.0:1
Power
74 PS (54 kW) at 6000 rpm
Torque
100 N⋅m (74 lb⋅ft) at 4000 rpm

== See also ==
- List of Mitsubishi engines
