= Mitsubishi 3G8 engine =

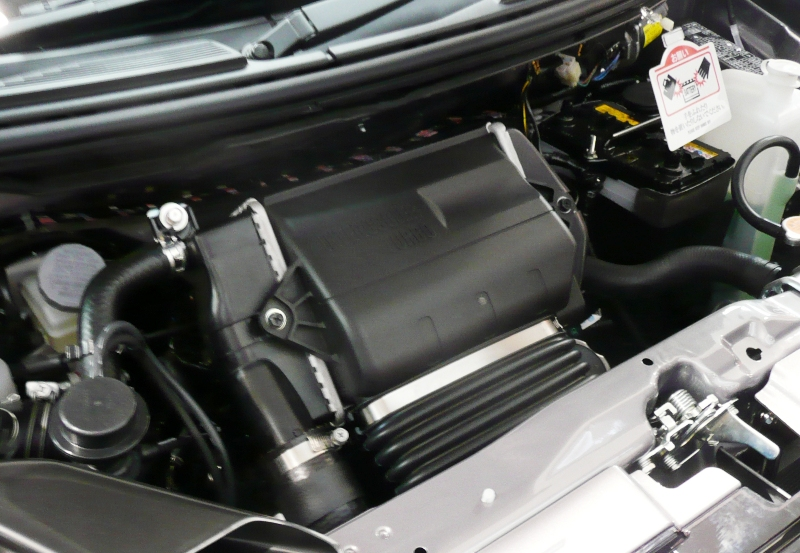

Overview
- Manufacturer: Mitsubishi Motors
- Production: 1987–present

Layout
- Configuration: Straight-3
- Displacement: 548 cc (33.4 cu in); 657 cc (40.1 cu in); 796 cc (48.6 cu in); 1,061 cc (64.7 cu in)
- Cylinder bore: 62.3 mm (2.45 in); 65 mm (2.56 in)
- Piston stroke: 60 mm (2.36 in); 66 mm (2.60 in); 80 mm (3.15 in)
- Cylinder block material: Cast iron
- Valvetrain: SOHC 2 Valves x Cyl. DOHC 5 Valves x Cyl.
- Compression ratio: 8.5:1, 9.8:1, 10.0:1

Combustion
- Supercharger: Available 1987–1990
- Turbocharger: with air-to-air intercooler (on 1989-1990 models)
- Fuel system: Carburetor; Electronic fuel injection
- Fuel type: Gasoline
- Cooling system: Water cooled

Output
- Power output: 22–47 kW (30–64 PS; 30–63 hp)
- Torque output: 41–96 N⋅m (30–71 lb⋅ft)

The Mitsubishi 3G8 engine is a range of three-cylinder powerplant from Mitsubishi Motors, introduced in the fifth generation of their Mitsubishi Minica kei car. In common with other contemporary engines in the class, it could be specified with many advanced technologies despite its diminutive size, including multi-valve cylinder heads and double overhead camshafts. The top-of-the-line Dangan ZZ variant was also the first kei car to benefit from turbocharging. In 1987 Mitsubishi was the first manufacturer to supercharge a kei vehicle, and in 1989 became the world's first production car to feature five valves per cylinder, ahead of similar developments by Bugatti, Audi, Ferrari and Toyota.

Its 3G81 three-cylinder engine has a displacement of 548 cc (33.4 cu in) and the 15-valve versions feature three intake valves and two exhaust valves incorporated into each cylinder. The valves are controlled by twin overhead camshafts through roller cam followers on finger rockers with hydraulic automatic lash adjusters. Gasoline is electronically injected through triple-jet nozzles (also a technological first). The water-cooled turbocharger operates through an air-to-air intercooler. The ignition timing advance is also controlled electronically, and a knock-sensing system is included.

Originally a 548 cc (33.4 cu in) engine, it was enlarged to 657 cc (40.1 cu in) in 1990 following changes in the class regulations. The four-cylinder 4A3 engine is derived from the 3G8, sharing a 72 mm (2.8 in) bore pitch.

== 3G81 ==
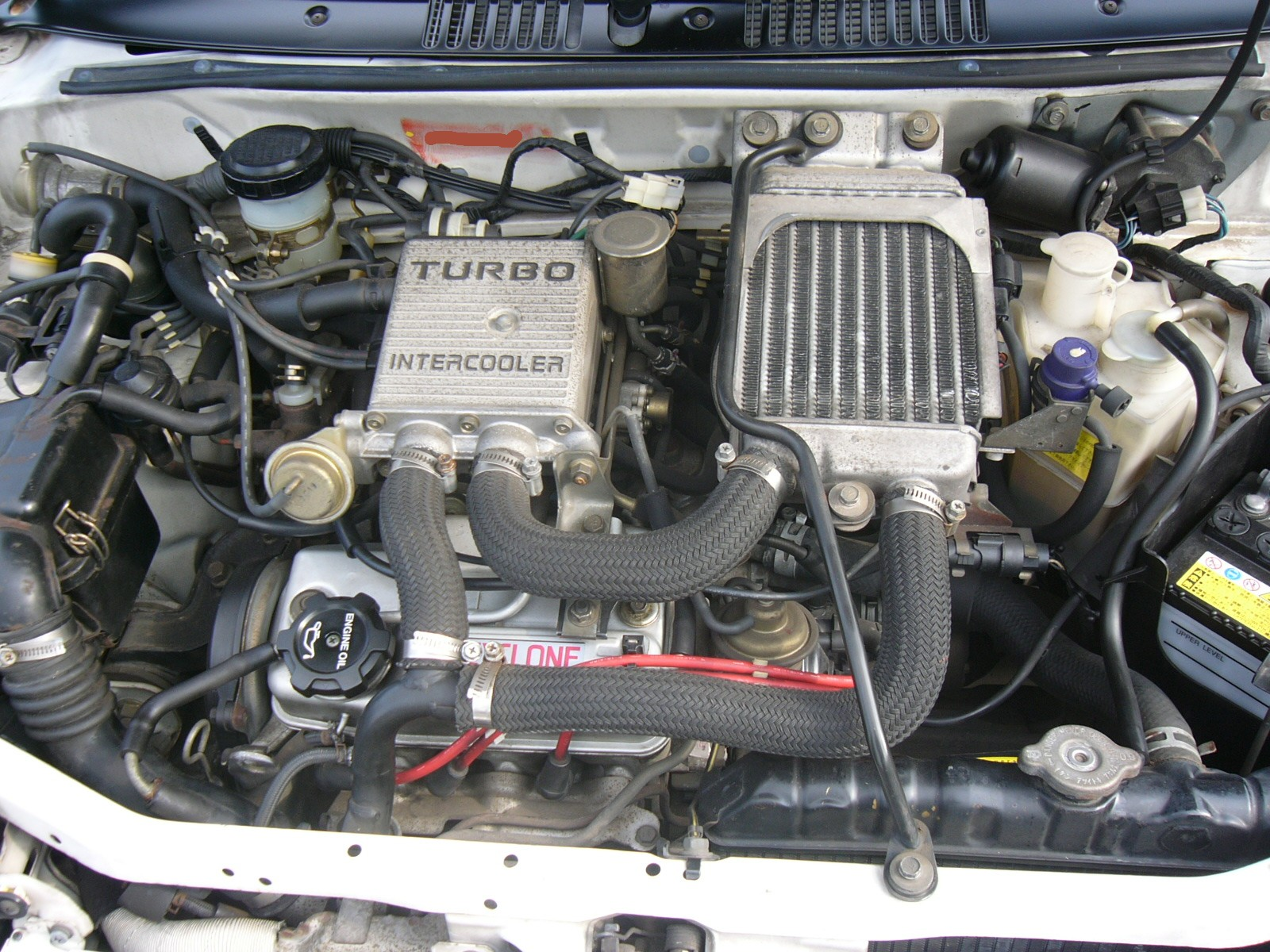
The turbocharged 3G81 in a fifth generation Minica (H14V)

Engine dimensions — 548 cc (33.4 cu in) inline three-cylinder
Bore — 62.3 mm (2.45 in)
Stroke — 60.0 mm (2.36 in)
Fuel type — Unleaded regular gasoline

Versions

Valvetrain	Fuel feed	Comp.	Power (JIS net)			Torque				Fitment	Notes
Valvetrain	Fuel feed	Comp.	PS	kW	at rpm	kgm	Nm	lbft	at rpm	Fitment	Notes
SOHC 6-valve	Single-barrel, downdraught carburetor	9.8:1	30	22	6,500	4.2	41	30	3,000	Mitsubishi Minica Econo H14V/15V (87.01–88.12); Mitsubishi Minica H21V/26V (89.01–90.02)	Commercial vehicle emissions standards
SOHC 6-valve	Single-barrel, sidedraught variable venturi carburetor	9.8:1	30	22	5,500	4.4	43	32	4,000	Mitsubishi Minicab U14T/V, U15T/V (87.06–90.02); Mitsubishi Bravo U14V/15V (89.02–90.02)	Commercial vehicle emissions standards
SOHC 6-valve	Double-barrel, downdraught carburetor	9.8:1	32	24	6,500	4.3	42	31	4,000	Mitsubishi Minica H14A/15A (87.01–88.12); Mitsubishi Minica H21A/26A (89.01–90.02)	
SOHC 6-valve	Single-barrel, sidedraught variable venturi carburetor, Supercharger	8.5:1	46	34	6,000	6.0	59	43	4,000	Mitsubishi Minicab U14T/V, U15T/V (87.06–91.02); Mitsubishi Bravo U14V/15V (89.02–91.02)	
SOHC 6-valve	Single-barrel, downdraught carburetor, turbocharger	8.5:1	50	37	6,500	6.7	66	48	3,500	Mitsubishi Minica/Econo H14A/V (87.01–88.12)	
DOHC 15-valve	Double-barrel, downdraught carburetor	10.0:1	38	28	7,000	4.4	43	32	4,500	Mitsubishi Minica H21/26 (89.08–90.02)	
DOHC 15-valve	EFI	10.0:1	46	34	7,500	4.7	46	34	5,500	Mitsubishi Minica H21/26 (89.08–90.02)	
DOHC 15-valve	EFI, turbocharger, IC	8.5:1	64	47	7,500	7.6	75	55	4,500	Mitsubishi Minica Dangan ZZ H21/26 (89.01–90.08)	

== 3G82 ==
Displacement — 796 cc (48.6 cu in)
Bore — 65 mm (2.56 in)
Stroke — 80 mm (3.15 in)
Engine type — Inline three-cylinder SOHC 6 valves
Power — 33 kW (45 PS; 44 hp) at unknown rpm

This was built only for the Taiwanese market Mitsubishi Towny (Minica) and Minicab 800, from 01.87 - 11.88. Most specifications are unknown.

== 3G83 ==
Displacement — 657 cc (40.1 cu in)
Bore — 65 mm (2.56 in)
Stroke — 66 mm (2.6 in)
Fuel type — Unleaded regular gasoline

=== Double carb (1990) ===
- Engine type — Inline three-cylinder SOHC
- Power — 29 kW (39 PS; 39 hp) at 6000 rpm
- Torque — 51 N⋅m (38 lb⋅ft) at 4000 rpm
- Fuel system — two-barrel down-draft carburettor
- Compression ratio — 9.8:1

=== DOHC (1990) ===
- Engine type — Inline three-cylinder DOHC
- Compression ratio — 9.8:4
- Fuel system — ECI multiple
- Power — 38 kW (52 PS; 51 hp) at 7500 rpm
- Torque — 56 N⋅m (41 lb⋅ft) at 5700 rpm

=== Turbo (1990) ===
- Engine type — Inline three-cylinder DOHC 15-valve intercooled turbo
- Compression ratio — 8.5:1
- Fuel system — ECI multiple
- Power — 47 kW (64 PS; 63 hp) at 7,500 rpm
- Torque — 96 N⋅m (71 lb⋅ft) at 4,500 rpm

== 4G82 ==
Displacement — 1,061 cc (64.7 cu in)
Bore — 65 mm (2.56 in)
Stroke — 80 mm (3.15 in)
Engine type — Inline four-cylinder SOHC
Power — 43 kW (58 PS; 58 hp) JIS at 5,500 rpm
Torque — 9.1 kg⋅m (89 N⋅m; 66 lb⋅ft) at 3,500 rpm

Of the same dimensions as the 3G82 but with a fourth cylinder, this was built in Taiwan by CMC (China Motor Corporation). Used in the Mitsubishi Varica (LWB version of fourth generation Mitsubishi Minicab).

== See also ==
- List of Mitsubishi engines
