= Leopaard Coupe =

Chinese compact crossover SUV

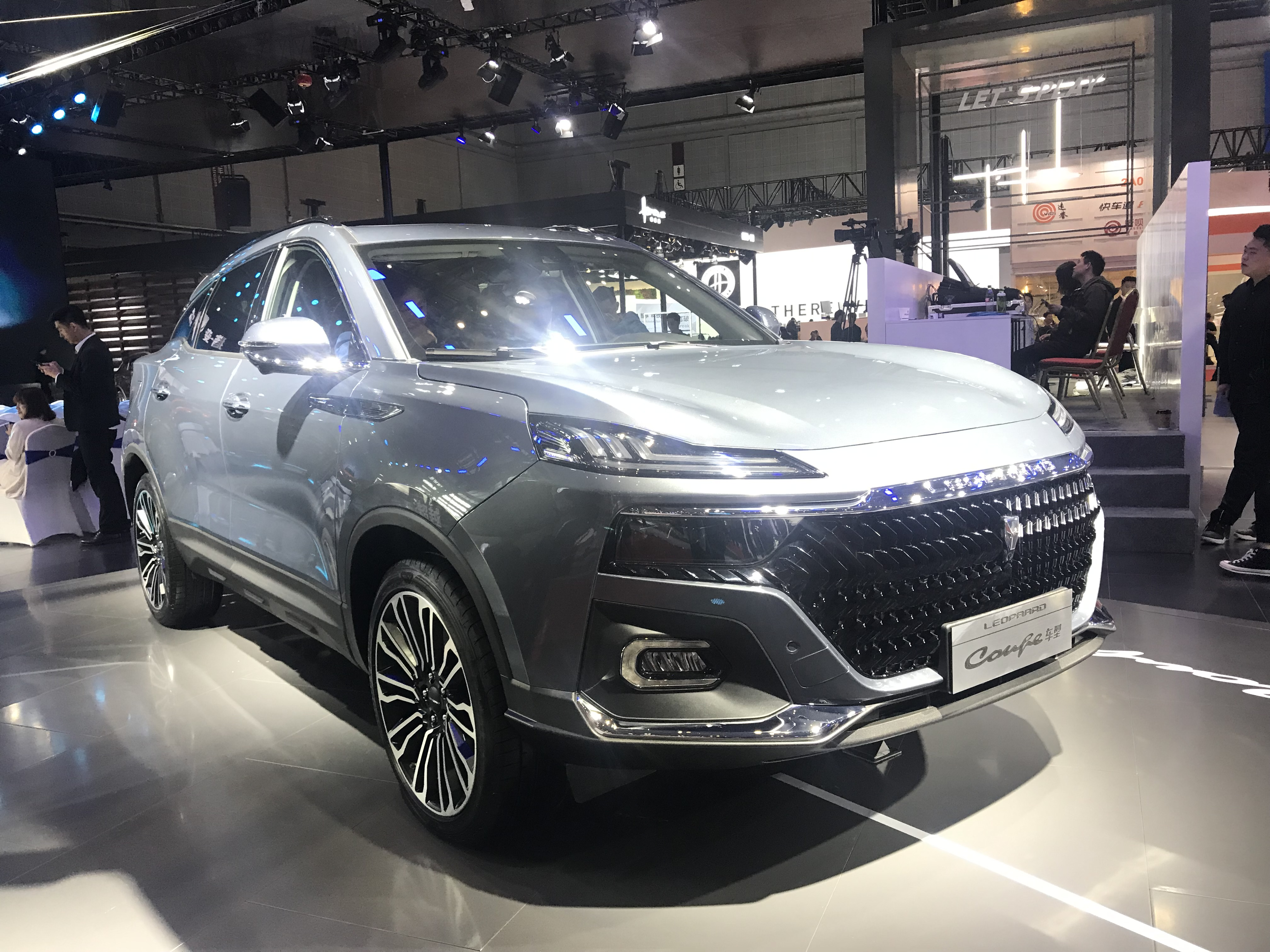

Overview
- Manufacturer: GAC Group
- Production: 2020
- Model years: 2020
- Assembly: Guangzhou, China

Body and chassis
- Class: Compact crossover SUV
- Body style: 5-door coupe SUV
- Layout: front-wheel-drive
- Related: Leopaard CS10; Leopaard Mattu

Powertrain
- Engine: 1.6 L CE16 I4 (turbo petrol)
- Transmission: 6 speed DCT

Dimensions
- Wheelbase: 2,780 mm (109.4 in)
- Length: 4,825 mm (190.0 in)
- Width: 1,908 mm (75.1 in)
- Height: 1,604 mm (63.1 in)

The Leopaard Coupe is a compact crossover SUV produced by Changfeng Motor of GAC Group under the Leopaard brand.

== Overview ==
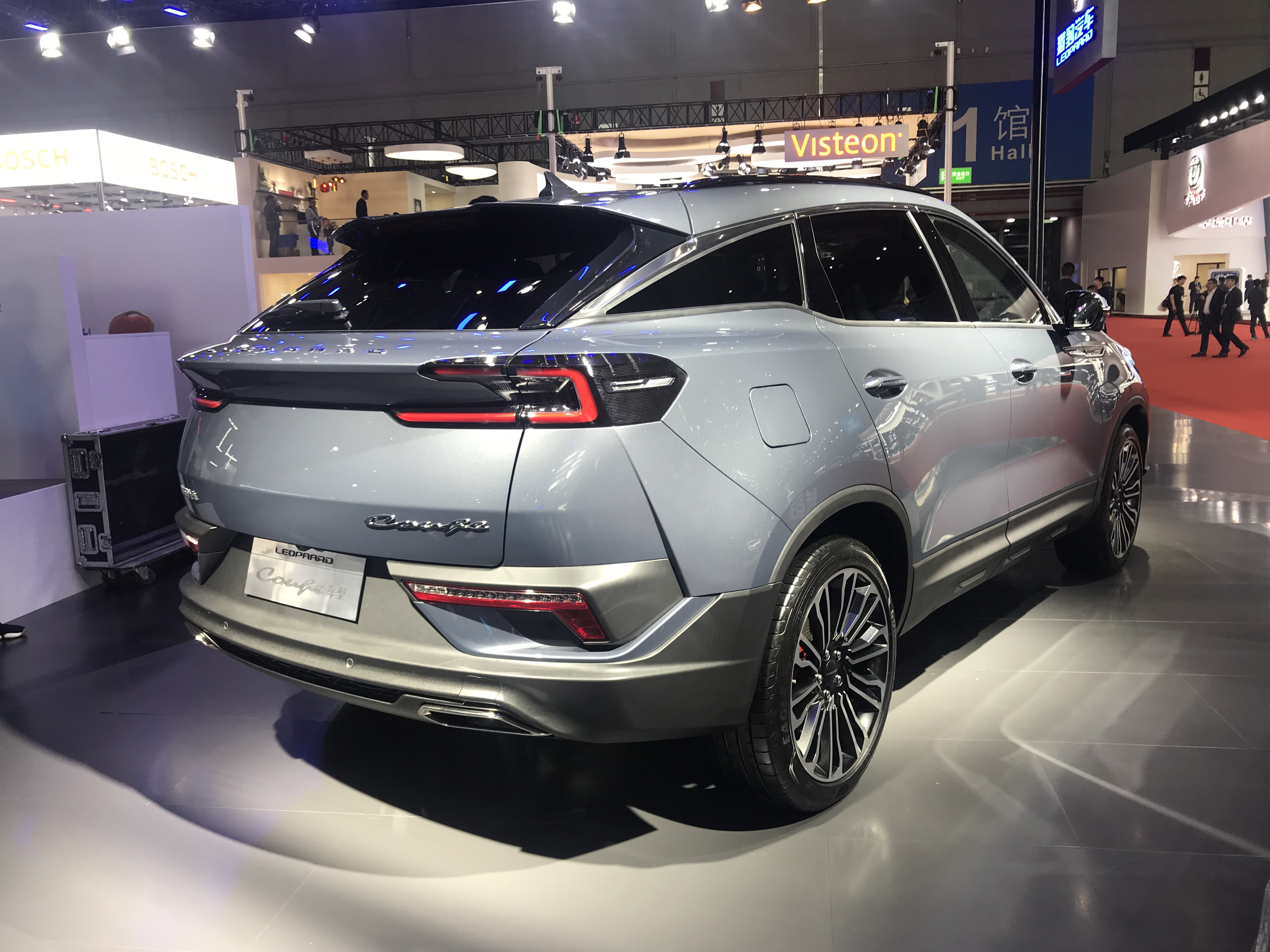
Leopaard Coupe rear

The Leopaard Coupe is based on the same platform as the Leopaard Mattu and Leopaard CS10 compact crossovers.

The Leopaard Coupe is powered by BMW’s CE16 1.6 liter turbo direct injection engine with a maximum power of 197hp (147kW) and a peak torque of 270 Nm, with the engine mated to a 6-speed dual-clutch transmission. The Leopaard Coupe features a front MacPherson and the multi-link independent rear suspension.
