= CS3 =

CS3 may refer to:

- Adobe CS3, software suite
- Cycle Superhighway 3, cycle path in London, England
- Leopaard CS3, electric vehicle
