= Leopaard CT7 =

Chinese pickup truck

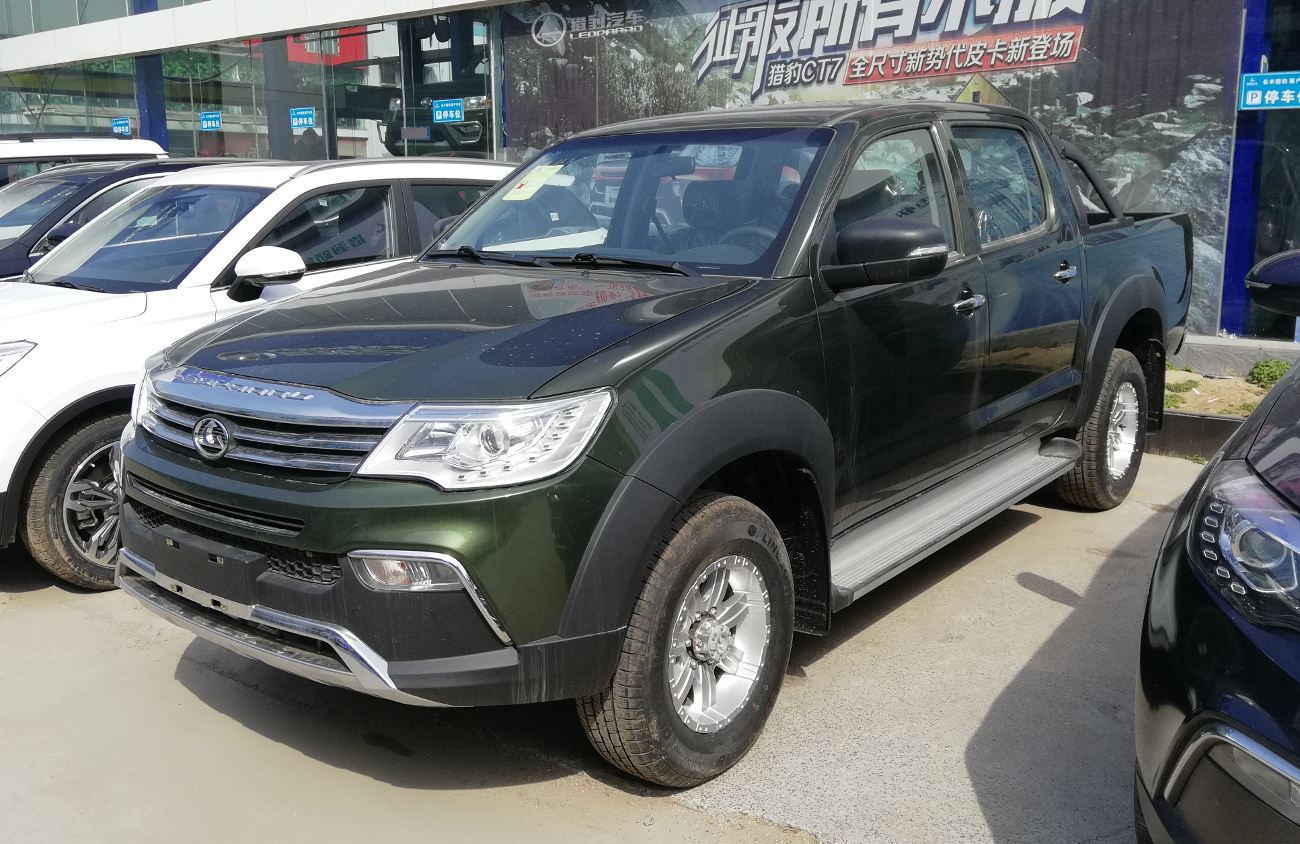

Overview
- Manufacturer: GAC Group
- Also called: Liebao CT7
- Production: 2016–2020
- Model years: 2016–2020
- Assembly: Guangzhou, China

Body and chassis
- Class: Mid-size pickup truck
- Body style: 4-door double cab
- Layout: Front-engine, four-wheel-drive

Powertrain
- Engine: 2.0 L M111 I4 (petrol); 2.4 L 2TZ-FE I4 (petrol); 2.7 L 4RB2 (petrol); 1.9 L D19TCID1 I4 (diesel); 3.2 L 4M41 I4-T (diesel)
- Transmission: 5-speed manual; 6-speed manual

Dimensions
- Wheelbase: 3,105 mm (122.2 in)
- Length: 5,310 mm (209.1 in)
- Width: 1,835 mm (72.2 in)
- Height: 1,785 mm (70.3 in)

The Leopaard CT7 is a mid-size pickup truck produced by Changfeng Motor of GAC Group under the Leopaard brand.

== Overview ==
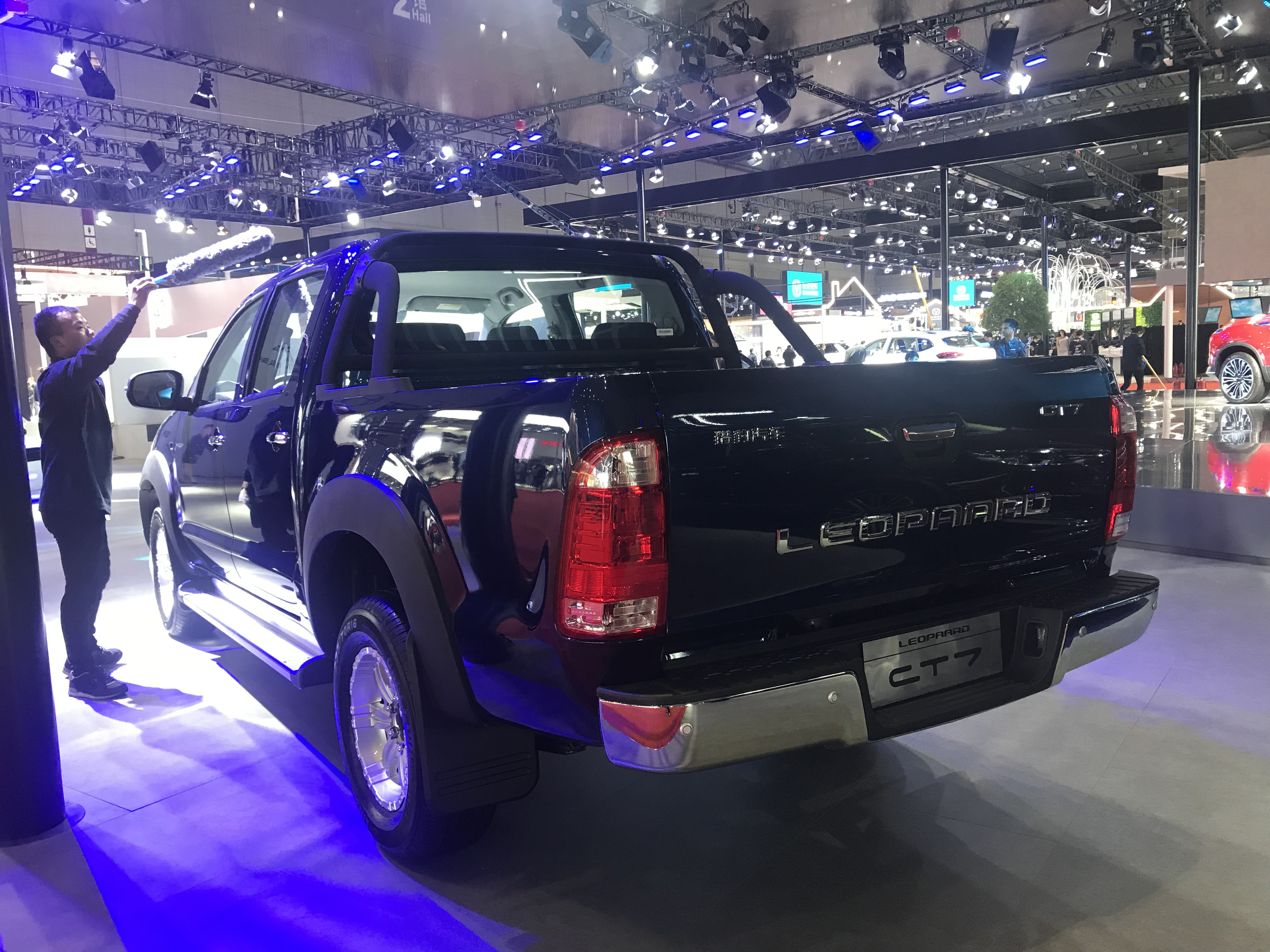
Leopaard CT7 rear

The Leopaard CT7 is debuted at the Beijing Auto Show in April 2016 and is being sold in China since September 2016.

The Leopaard CT7 is powered by either a 1.9-liter turbo inline-4 engine producing 150 hp (112 kW) or a 2.4-liter inline-4 engine producing 147 hp (110 kW). With the 1.9-liter turbo engine mated to a 6-speed manual transmission and the 2.4-liter engine mated to a 5-speed manual transmission. It is known for having copied the design of the Toyota Hilux.
