= Leopaard CS7 =

Chinese compact CUV

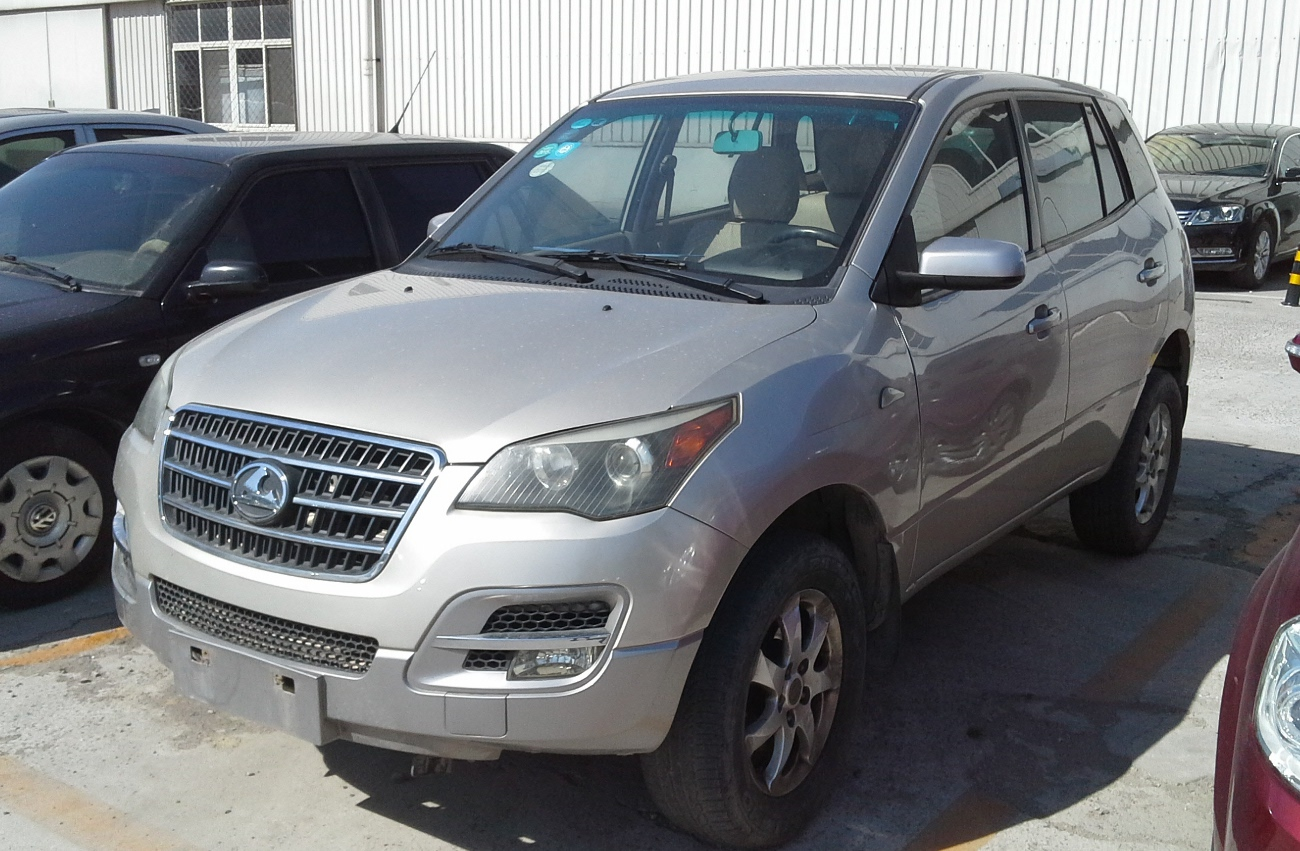
- Changfeng Liebao CS7 Sports

Overview
- Manufacturer: GAC Group
- Also called: Liebao CS7; Leopaard Feiteng C5
- Production: 2009–2010
- Model years: 2009–2010
- Assembly: Guangzhou, China
- Designer: Pininfarina

Body and chassis
- Class: Compact crossover SUV
- Body style: 5-door SUV
- Layout: Front-engine, rear-wheel-drive; Front-engine, four-wheel-drive
- Related: Mitsubishi Pajero iO

Powertrain
- Engine: 2.0 L 4G94 I4 (petrol)
- Transmission: 5-speed manual

Dimensions
- Wheelbase: 2,550 mm (100.4 in)
- Length: 4,210 mm (165.7 in)
- Width: 1,730 mm (68.1 in)
- Height: 1,700 mm (66.9 in)
- Curb weight: 1,345–1,435 kg (2,965–3,164 lb)

Chronology
- Successor: Leopaard CS9

The Leopaard CS7 or Liebao CS7 is a compact crossover SUV produced by Changfeng Motor of GAC Group under the Leopaard brand that was sold from 2009 to 2010.

== Overview ==
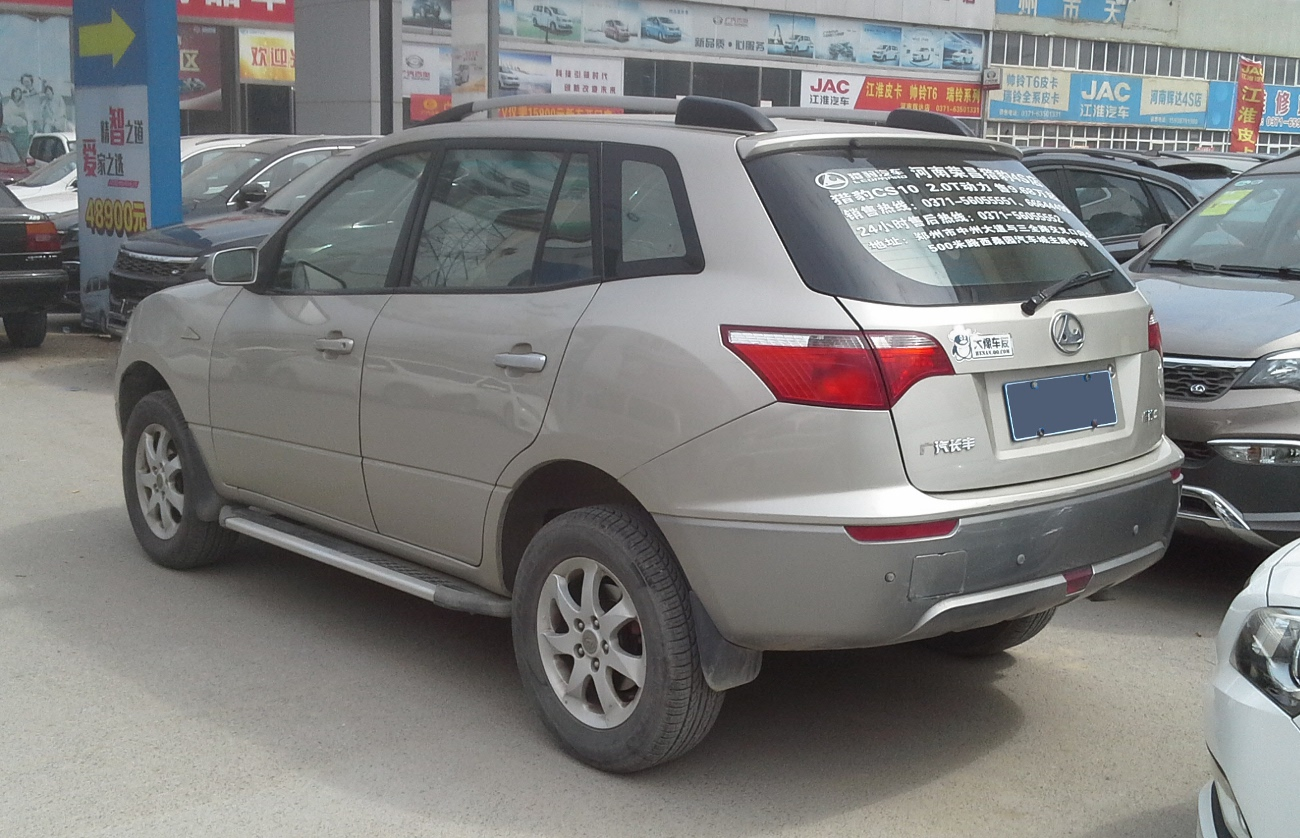
Leopaard CS7 rear

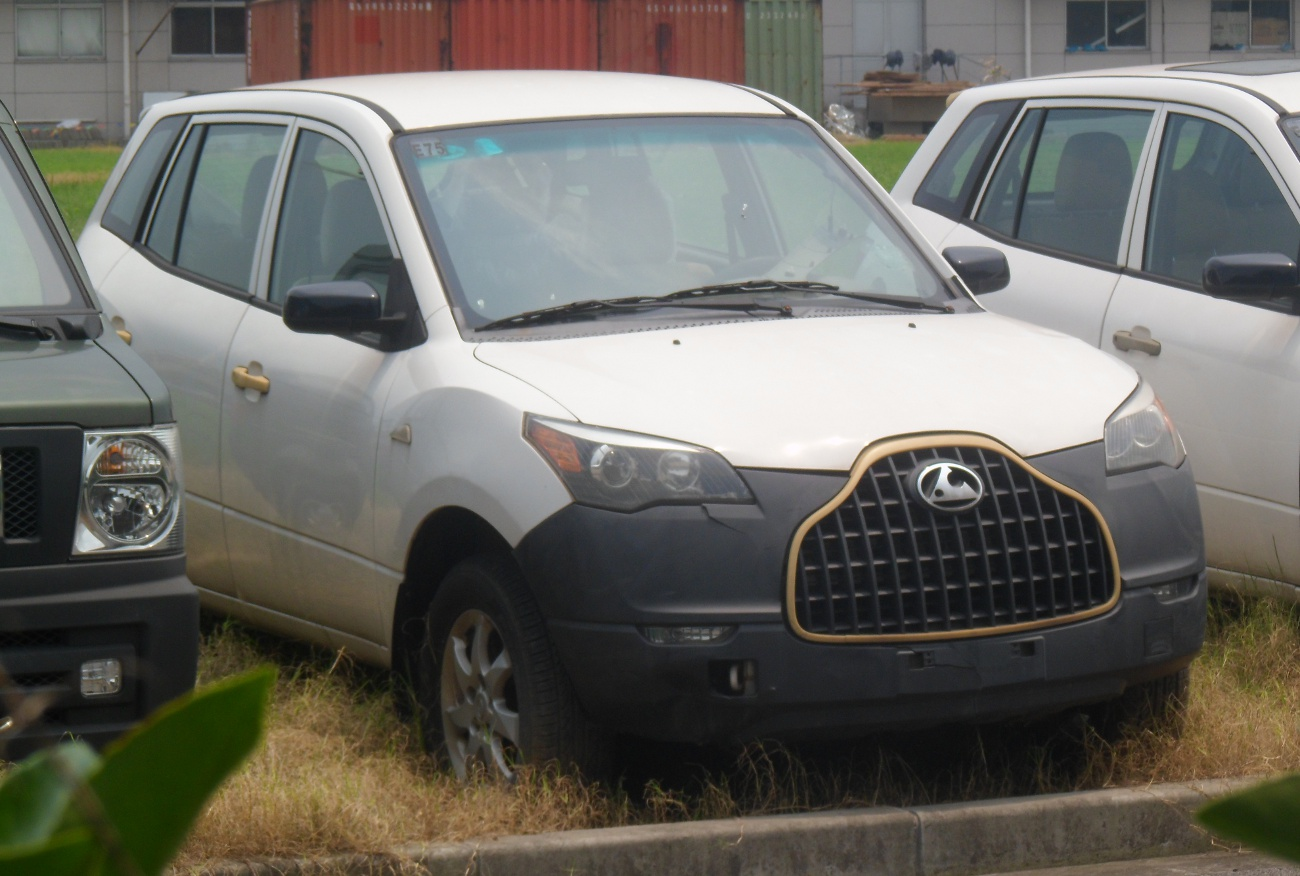
Changfeng Liebao CS7 Art

Originally called the Leopaard Feiteng C5 (猎豹飞腾 C5), the Leopaard CS7 shares the same platform as the Leopaard Feiteng (猎豹飞腾) SUV which is essentially a rebadged Mitsubishi Pajero iO. The Leopaard CS7 or Leopaard Feiteng C5 body was restyled by Pininfarina.

The Leopaard CS7 was introduced to the Chinese car market with prices ranging from 99,800 to 123,800 yuan.

The Leopaard CS7 is powered by a lone 2.0-liter 4G94 inline-4 engine sourced from Mitsubishi producing 121 hp, with the engine mated to a 5-speed manual transmission. The top speed of the Leopaard CS7 is 160 km/h.
