= Changfeng Acuman =

Compact sedan

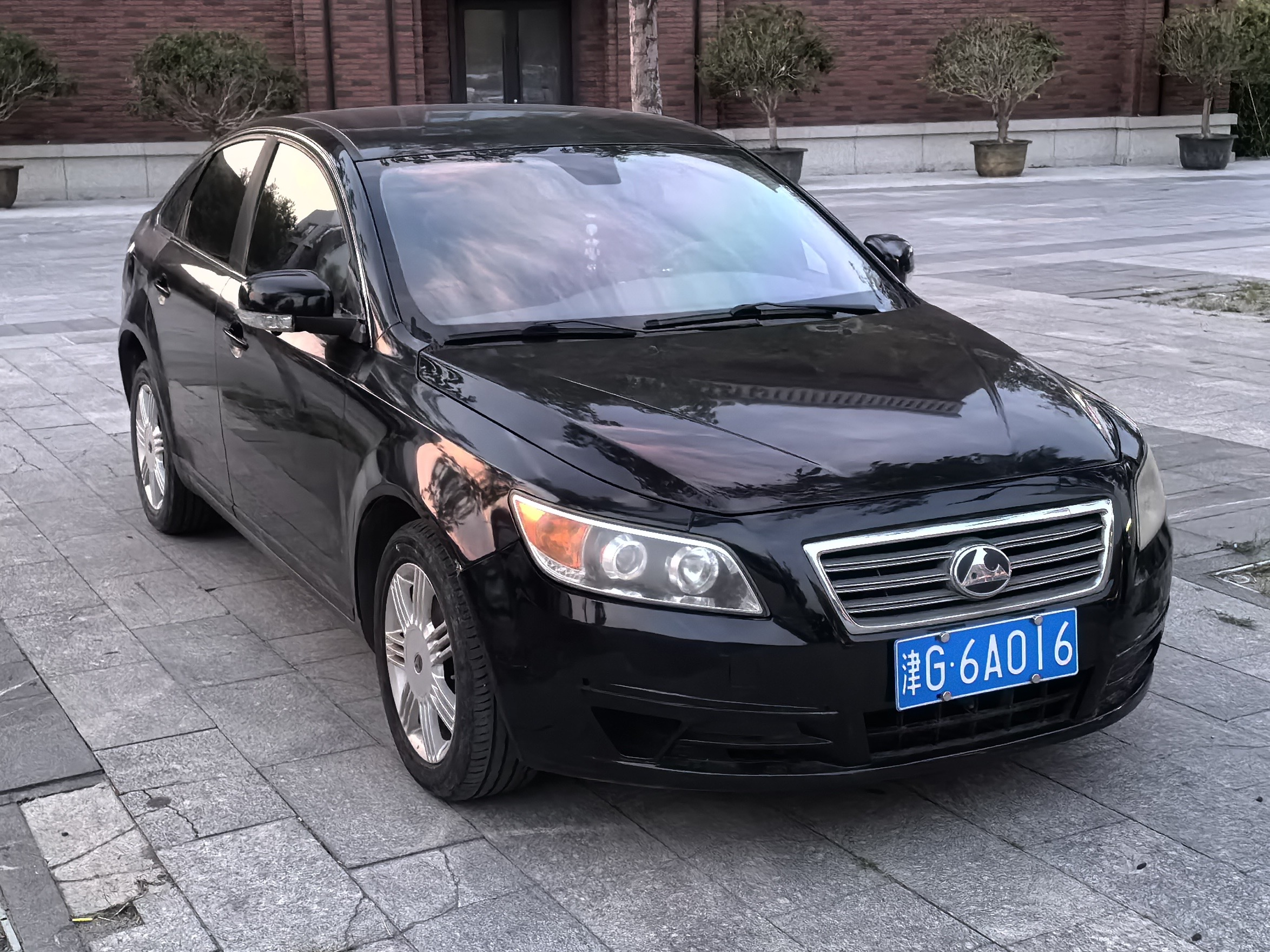

Overview
- Manufacturer: GAC Group
- Model code: CP21
- Also called: Changfeng Acumen (pre-production); Zhongxing Ark (cancelled)
- Production: 2011–2012
- Assembly: China: Changsha, Hunan; China: Yichang, Hubei (ZX Auto, planned)
- Designer: CH-Auto (Beijing Great Wall Huaguan Automobile Technology Co., Ltd.)

Body and chassis
- Class: Compact car
- Body style: 4-door sedan
- Layout: Front-engine, front-wheel-drive
- Related: Mitsubishi Lancer

Powertrain
- Engine: 1.8 L CF4G18D I4; 1.8 L Dong'an 4G93D I4
- Transmission: 5-speed manual

Dimensions
- Wheelbase: 2,640 mm (103.9 in)
- Length: 4,483 mm (176.5 in)
- Width: 1,770 mm (69.7 in)
- Height: 1,462 mm (57.6 in)

The Changfeng Acuman, previously named Acumen (Chinese: 长丰 欧酷曼; pinyin: Ōukùmàn), also sold as the Liebao Acuman, is a compact sedan produced by the Chinese automaker Changfeng Motor between 2011 and 2012.

== Development and production ==
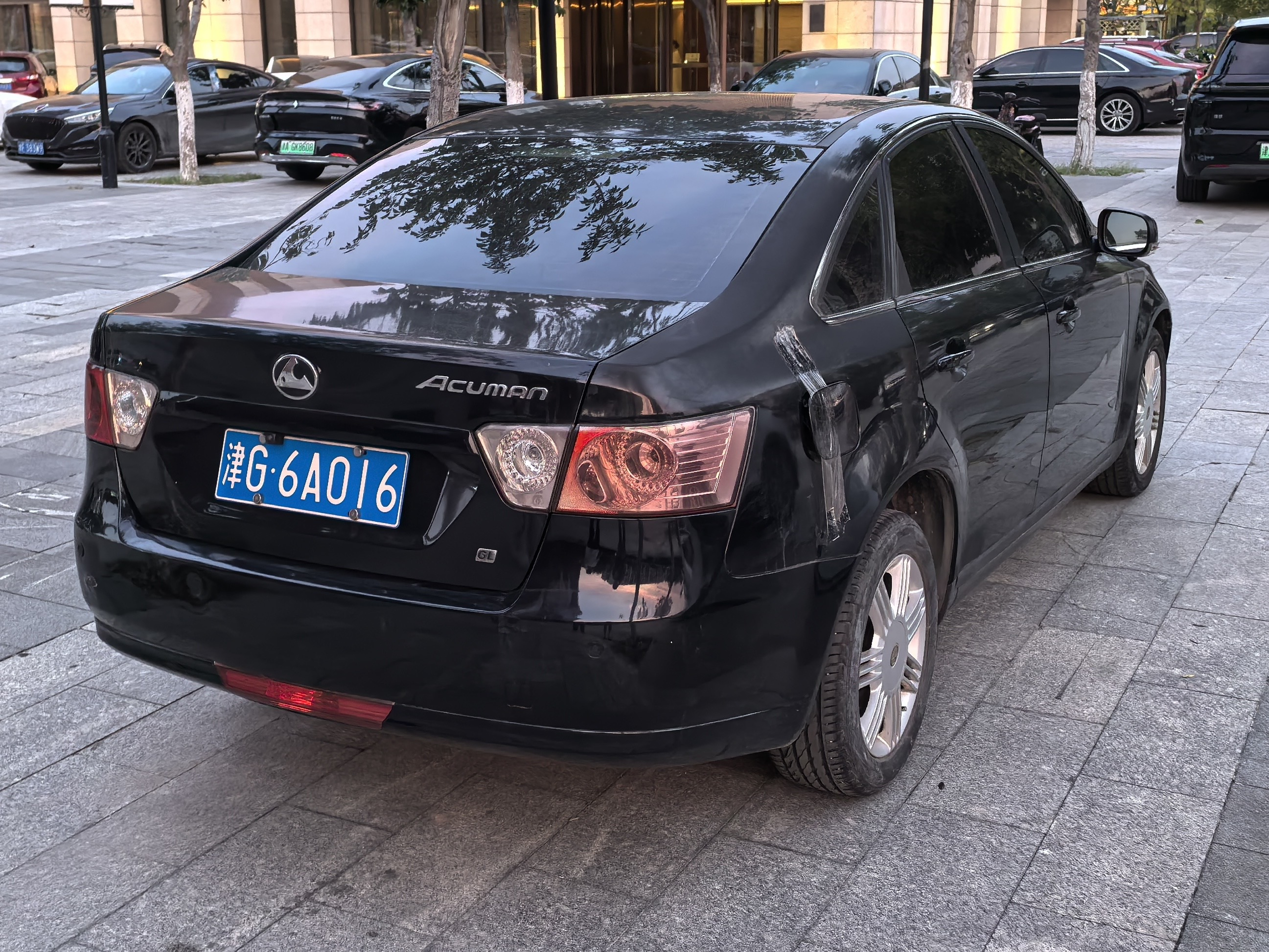
Rear view

The Acuman was initially previewed as the Changfeng Acumen at the 2009 Shanghai Auto Show. The design was executed by the Beijing-based firm CH-Auto.

It was shown again at the 2010 Auto Guangzhou, and went on sale in July 2011.

The styling was widely noted by contemporary press as a "clone" of the second generation Volvo S40. Notably, the Acuman shared the S40's exact 2,640 mm wheelbase and was near-identical in other dimensions, built on a platform derived from the Mitsubishi Lancer.

== Related concepts and unproduced derivatives ==
- CP22 Hatchback: A five-door hatchback model was developed. A prototype of the CP22 was physically seen arriving on a truck for the 2009 Guangzhou Auto Show build-up, but it was never officially unveiled or shown to the public and subsequently vanished.
- CP23 Sport Coupe: A two-door coupe concept was shown alongside the sedan at the 2009 Shanghai Auto Show. It was planned for a 2011 launch, but it never materialized.

== Failed revivals ==
The Acuman was subject to two major instances of failed revival attempts after its initial production ceased. The platform was reportedly sold to the GAC Group's joint venture with another Chinese automaker, Zhongxing (ZX Auto).

== Zhongxing Ark (Fangzhou) ==
- In 2013, the sedan—an unchanged rebadge of the Acuman—was initially displayed at the 2013 Shanghai Auto Show and later formally introduced as the Zhongxing Ark (Fangzhou), sometimes simplified to ZX Ark.
- Despite the auto show debut, production statistics for ZX Auto in 2014 and 2015 confirmed the company did not manufacture any sedans, proving the Zhongxing Ark never entered commercial production.

== "Run Pard" (Lanbao) ==
- A proposed GAC-ZX Auto sub-brand named Lanbao (sometimes phonetically translated as "Run Pard") was announced circa 2016. Investment materials showed a new drawing of a sedan planned to replace the Acuman.
- The sedan itself was never produced under this name. The only known physical prototype bearing the Lanbao logo on the factory floor was an SUV, not the Acuman sedan. The entire Lanbao venture was cancelled shortly after.

== Sales ==
Annual Sales Figures
Year	Total Sales (Units)
2011	626
2012	1
Total	627
