= Leopaard CS9 =

Chinese subcompact CUV

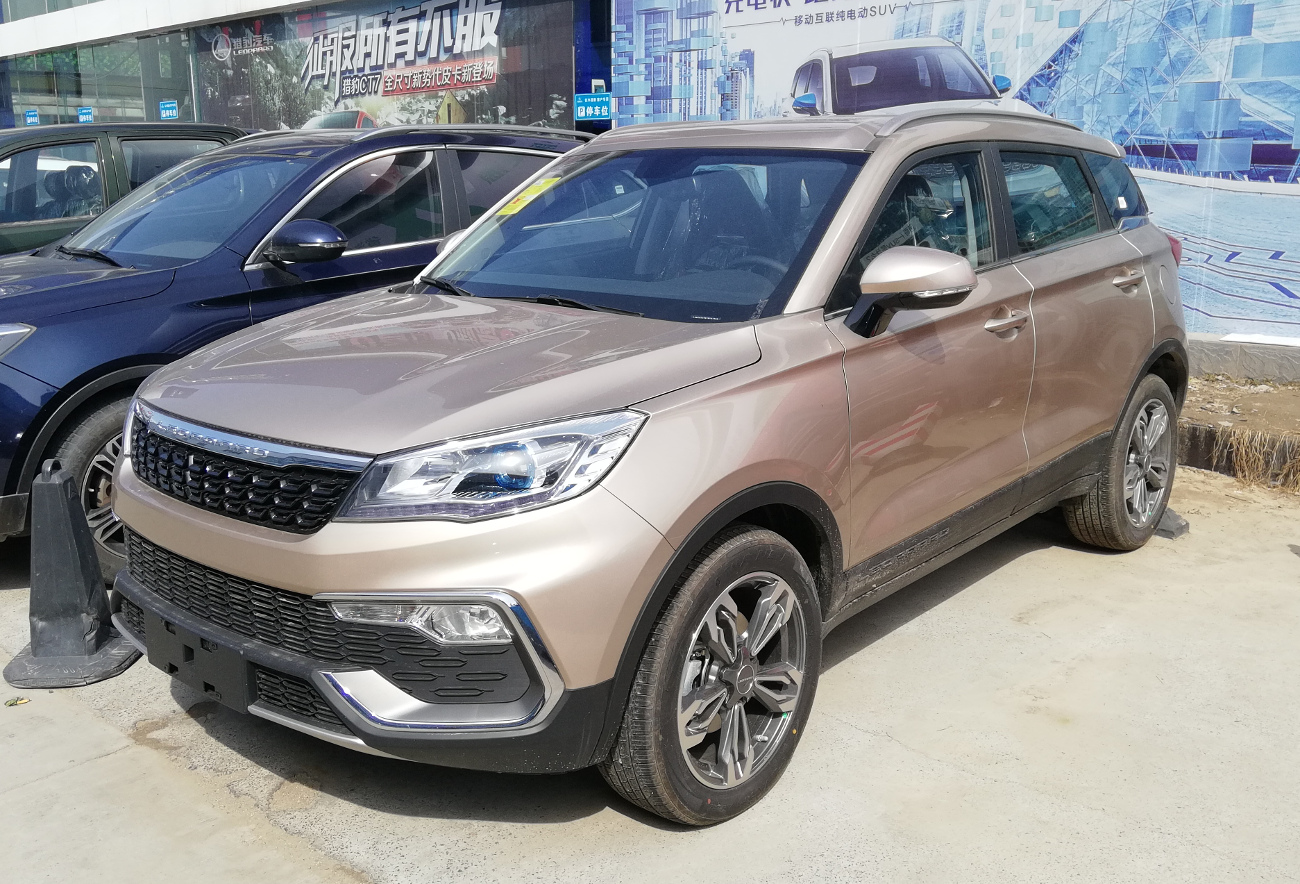

Overview
- Manufacturer: GAC Group
- Also called: Liebao CS9
- Production: 2017–2020
- Model years: 2017–2020
- Assembly: Guangzhou, China

Body and chassis
- Class: Subcompact crossover SUV
- Body style: 5-door SUV
- Layout: Front-engine, front-wheel-drive

Powertrain
- Engine: 1.5 L 4G15 I4 (petrol); 1.5 L 4G15T I4 (turbo petrol)
- Transmission: 6-speed manual; 5-speed manual; CVT

Dimensions
- Wheelbase: 2,600 mm (102.4 in)
- Length: 4,315 mm (169.9 in)
- Width: 1,840 mm (72.4 in)
- Height: 1,650 mm (65.0 in)

Chronology
- Predecessor: Leopaard CS7

The Leopaard CS9 or Liebao CS9 is a subcompact crossover SUV produced by Changfeng Motor of GAC Group under the Leopaard brand.

== Overview ==
The Leopaard CS9 debuted during the 2017 Beijing Auto Show, and was introduced to the Chinese car market in April 2017 with prices ranging from 76,800 to 129,800 yuan. An electric version called the Leopaard CS9 EV was also available with prices ranging from 195,800 to 205,800 yuan.

The CS9 is powered by a 1.5 liter inline-4 engine producing 113 hp or a 1.5-liter inline-4 turbo engine producing 150 hp. The 1.5-liter engine comes with a 5-speed manual gearbox, while the 1.5-liter turbo engine is available with either a 6-speed manual gearbox or a continuously variable transmission (CVT).

== CS9 EV ==
The CS9 EV is the electric version of the CS9 crossover SUV. It was launched in 2017 with a 48.18KWh battery pack, supporting a range up to 158 miles (255km). Later in March 2019, the CS9 EV360 was launched as an upgraded variant. The Leopaard CS9 EV360 is equipped with a 50.58kWh battery pack, and is powered by a 90kW (122ps, 120hp) electric motor with a maximum torque of 260N.m. The energy density of the battery is 140.5Wh/kg, and the NEDC working range is 223 miles (360km).

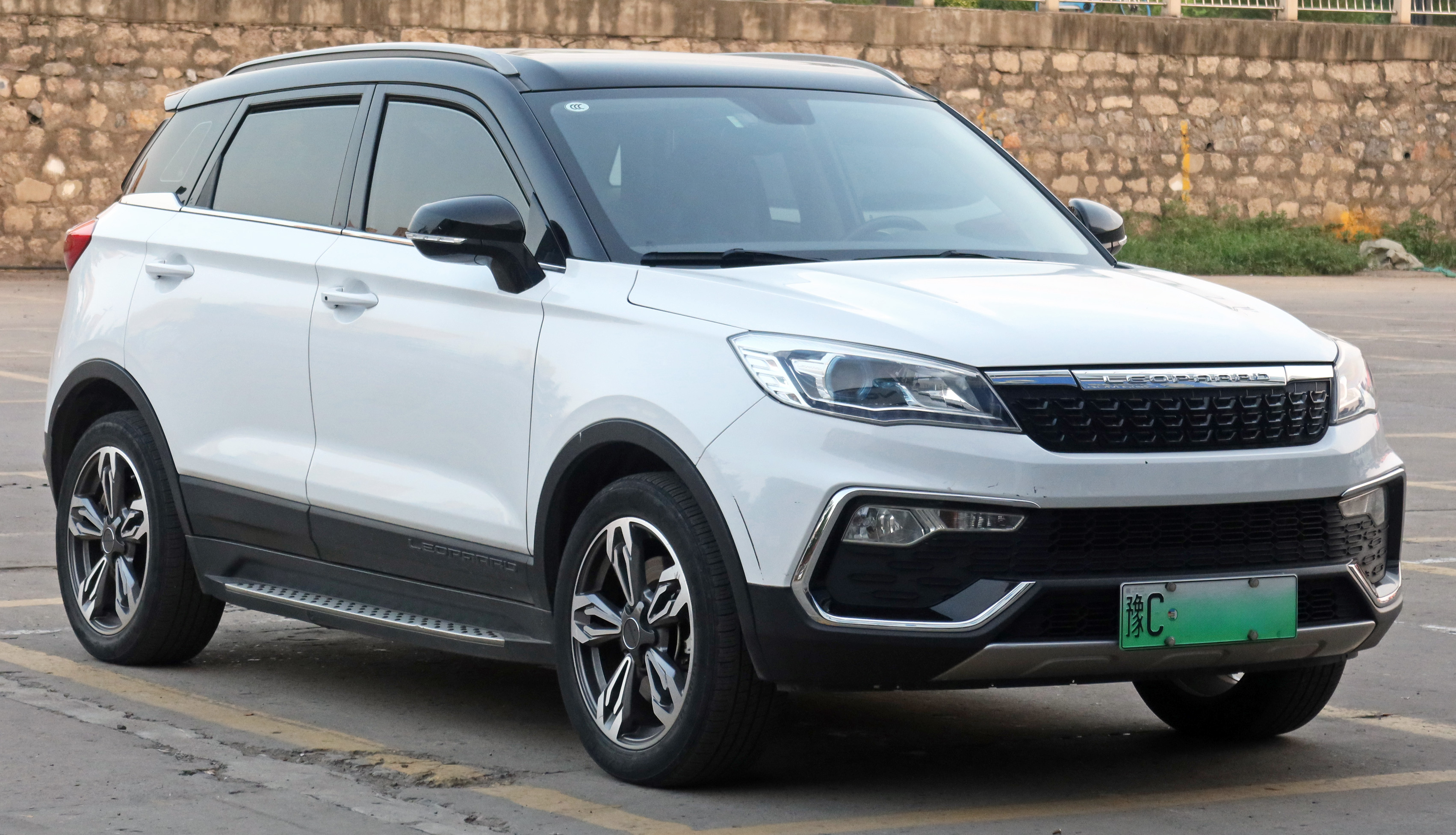
Leopaard CS9 EV

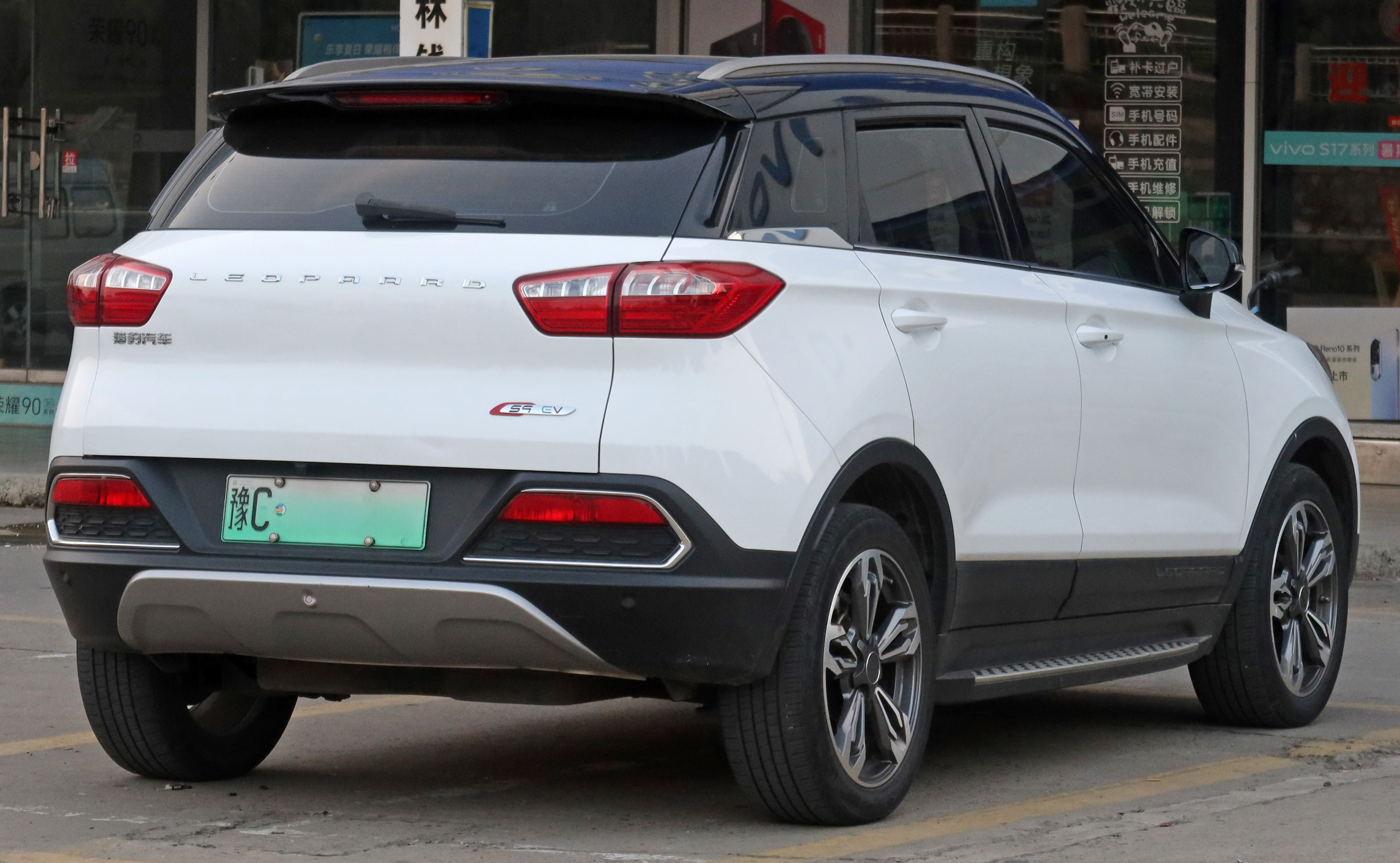
Rear view
