= Changfeng Motor =

Chinese automobile manufacturer

GAC Changfeng Motor Co., Ltd.
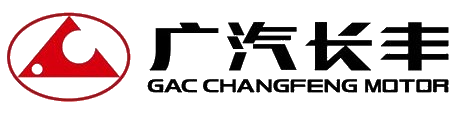
- Type: Subsidiary of Guangzhou Automobile Group
- Industry: Automotive
- Founded: 1950; 76 years ago (Original establishment); 1996 (CMC establishment); 2009-12-30 (GAC Changfeng Motor Co., Ltd.)
- Defunct: 2020; 6 years ago
- Headquarters: Changsha, Hunan, China
- Area served: China
- Products: Automobiles

Changfeng Motor
- Simplified Chinese: 广汽长丰汽车股份有限公司
- Traditional Chinese: 廣汽長豐汽車股份有限公司
Transcriptions
Standard Mandarin
- Hanyu Pinyin: Guǎngqì Zhǎngfēng qìchē gǔfèn yǒuxiàn gōngsī

GAC Changfeng Motor Co Ltd was a Chinese automobile manufacturer wholly owned by GAC Group but which originated as a branch of the People's Liberation Army. Changfeng produced mainly light trucks, and as of 2008 the majority of their sales had been to the Chinese state.

The company has manufactured license built Mitsubishi Pajero copies sold in China under the Mitsubishi brand as well as Pajero variations that bear the brand name Lièbào, which means cheetah, the Lièbào name later transformed into Leopaard. They also offer two variations of Mitsubishi pickups: Fine, and Flying. The Kylin was a compact hatchback offered during a short-lived, three year, joint venture with Bird Technology, a Chinese mobile phone maker. Its name, from a mythical Chinese beast, the qilin. The Kylin was included in Changfeng's appearance at the Detroit Auto show in 2008.

== History ==
=== Hunan Changfeng Motor Co. era ===
Changfeng had its origins in No.7319 Factory, which was a small repair facility for military equipment. Production of SUVs (license built Beijing BJ2020s) began in 1988, and in 1996 the name of the company was changed to Changfeng Auto Manufacturing. Until 1996, the company was a commercial affiliate of the People's Liberation Army (PLA). The 1991 Mitsubishi Pajero has been built by Changfeng since 1995. The company has exclusively produced light trucks.

On 25 December 2009, Hunan Changfeng Motor Co. announced the company name would be changed to GAC Changfeng Motor Co., Ltd. (湖南长丰汽车制造股份有限公司), effective on 30 December 2009.

=== GAC Changfeng Motor Co., Ltd. era ===
==== Acquisition by GAC Group ====
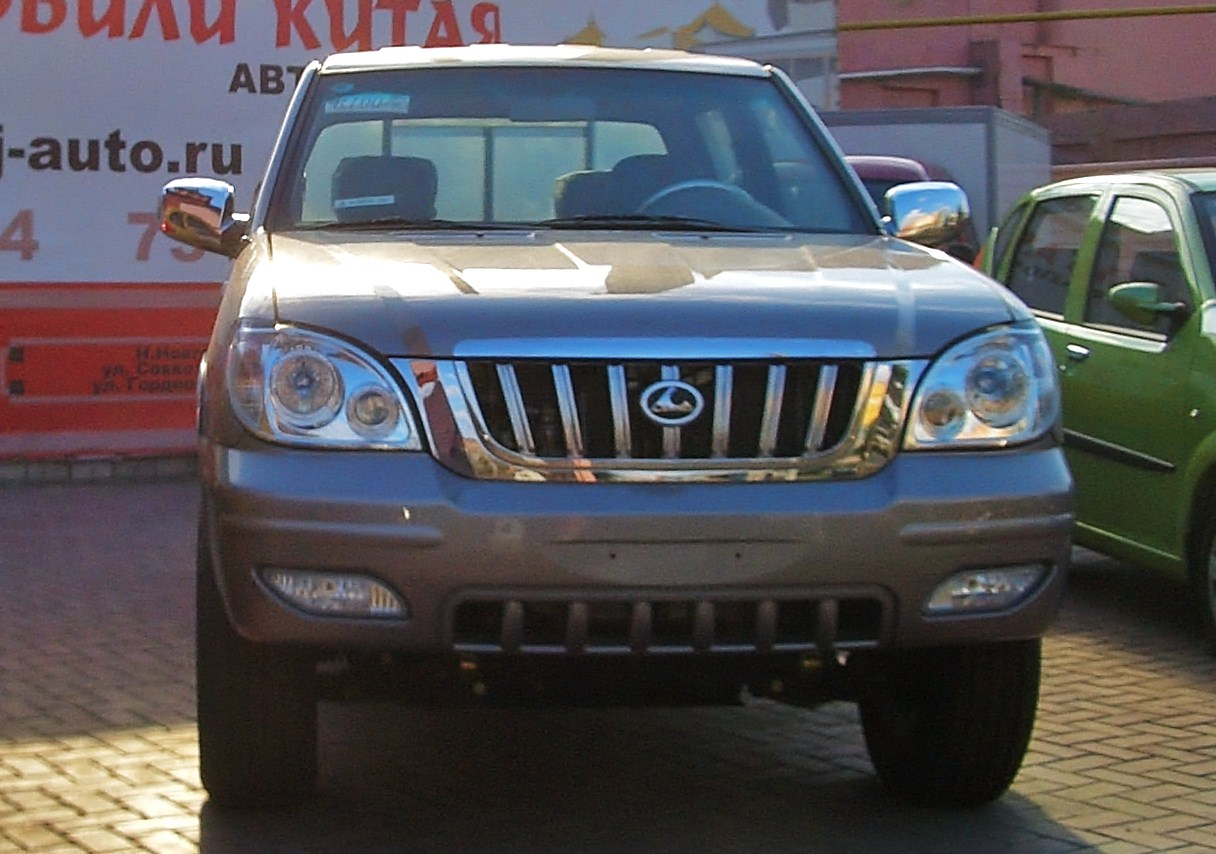
Liebao CS6

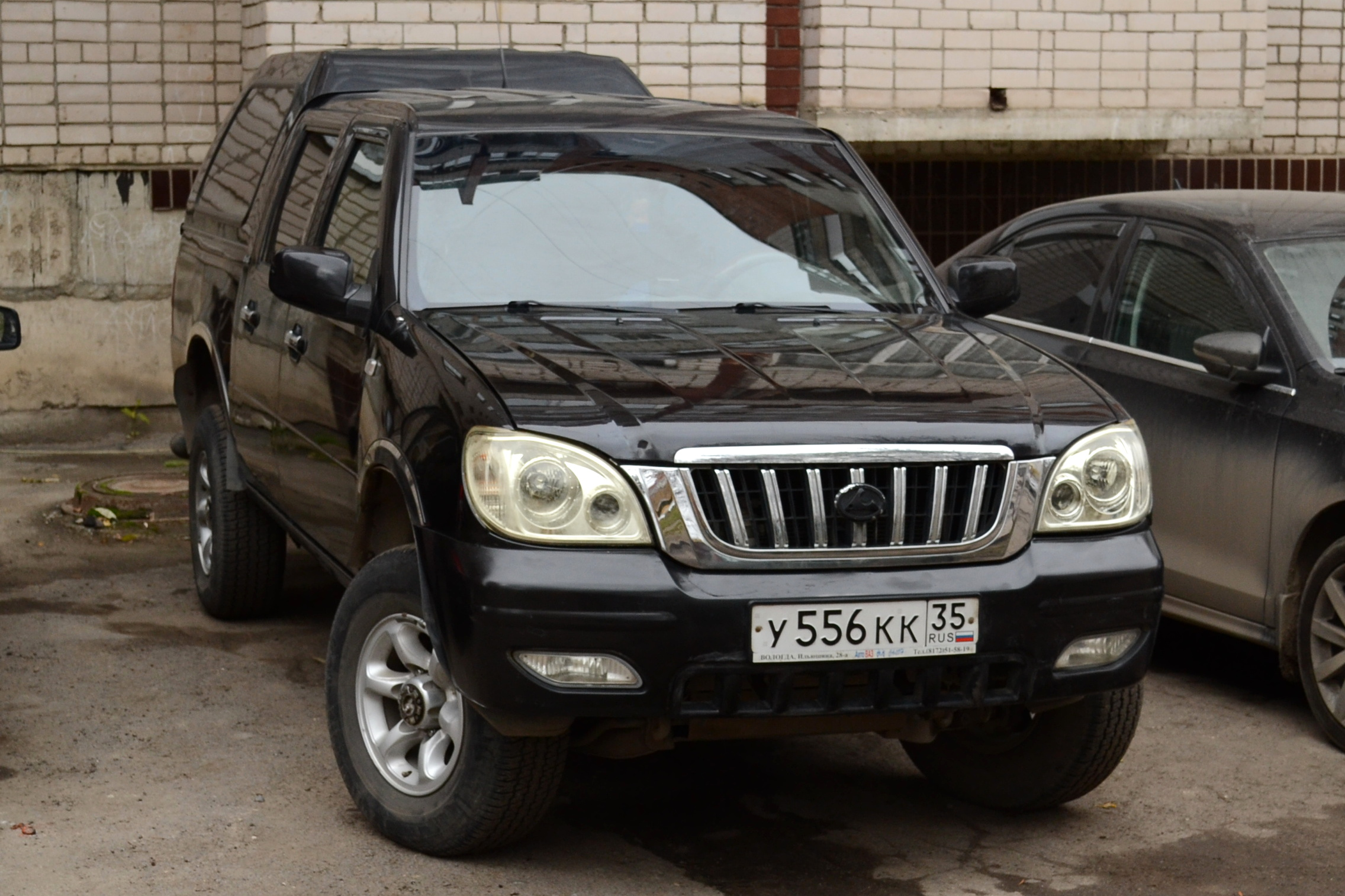
ChangFeng Flying

Prior a minority shareholder with only 29% ownership, GAC Group took control of Changfeng in 2012 after a long run-up dating from 2009 that included promises to turn the company into a joint venture with Mitsubishi. Previously, 22% of the company was owned by Changfeng Group and another 15% by Mitsubishi. These stakes were sold in 2011. As a result of being acquired by GAC, the company was delisted from the Shanghai stock exchange on March 20, 2012.

During the acquisition process, Changfeng's Shanghai listed stock fluctuated wildly leading to its suspension from October 28, 2010, until sometime after March 17, 2011.

==== Bankruptcy ====
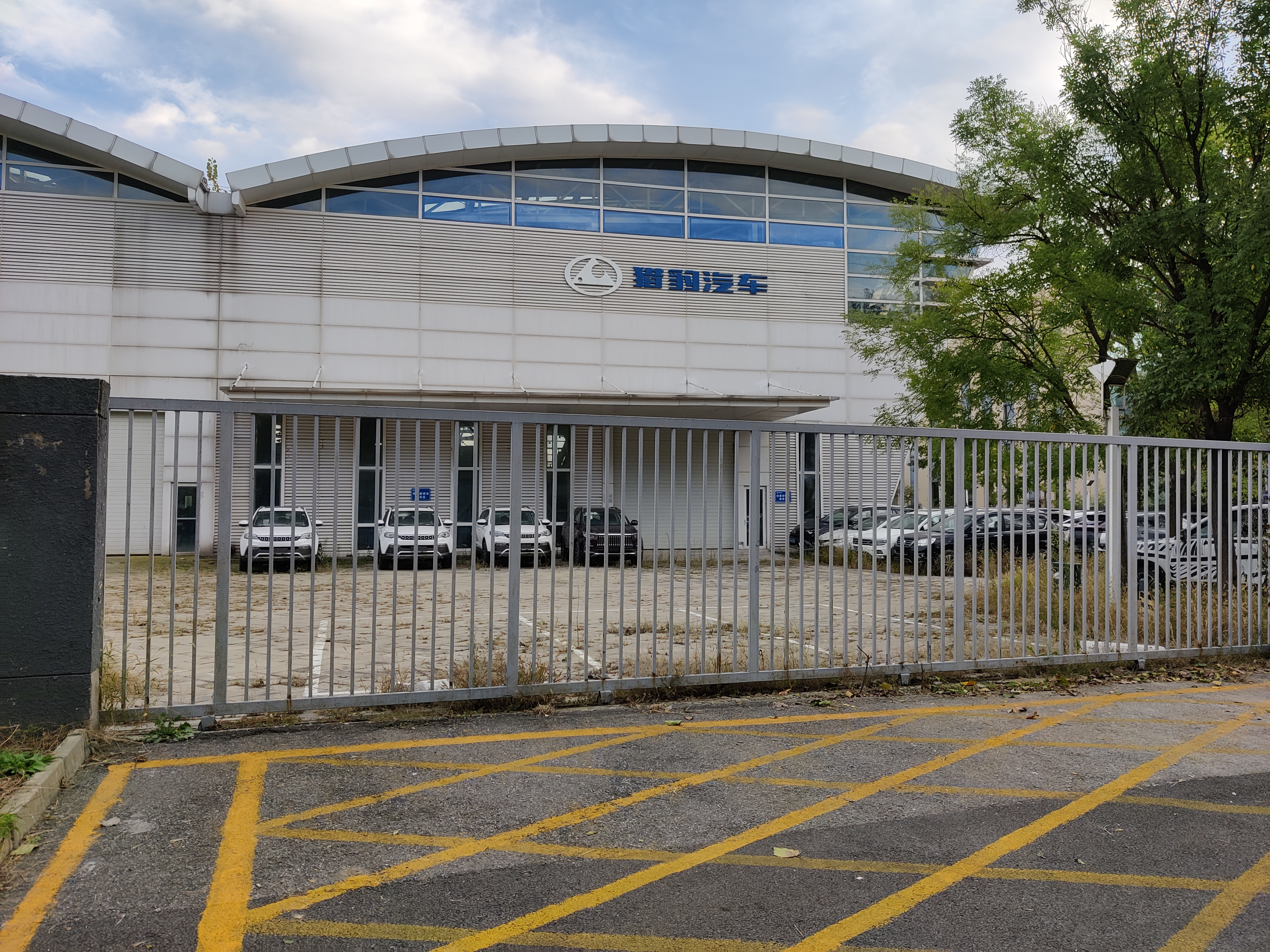
Abandoned Leopaard R&D center in Shunyi, Beijing. Photographed in October 2021.

As of July 2021, Hunan Leopaard Motors Co., Ltd. has declared bankruptcy. The news follows predictions and evaluations done in October 2019, stating that Leopaard Motors would be bankrupt by the end of 2019 due to slow sales.

== Subsidiaries ==
In late 2010, Mitsubishi and Guangzhou Automobile Group signed a memorandum of understanding to set up a new equally owned joint venture by restructuring Changfeng. Although this would have required Mitsubishi to increase its ownership to fifty percent, in 2011 Mitsubishi sold its entire stake in the company, instead.

In 2011, it was reported that GAC would take control of Changfeng's Lièbào brand, which markets SUVs based on the Mitsubishi Pajero built in Changsha and Yongzhou. Production in Changsha was to be discontinued after the transfer to GAC.

- GAC Mitsubishi Motors Co., Ltd.: In October 2012, GAC and Mitsubishi Motors announced the new joint venture, GAC Mitsubishi Motors Co., Ltd., would take over ″the factory (Xing Sha Factory), supply-chain, distribution channel and marketing know-how available from GACCF″.
- Hunan Liebao Automobile Co., Ltd.: In 2012 Changfeng Group began moves to re-enter the vehicle business culminating in the move to a new headquarters in Changsha in January 2013 and the establishment of a new subsidiary, Hunan Liebao Automobile Co., Ltd., alongside the continuing Anhui Changfeng Yangzi Automobile Manufacturing Co., Ltd., to oversea manufacturing and marketing of vehicles under the Liebao or "Leopaard" brand.

== Products ==
The representing main brand of Changfeng Motor is currently Leopaard, which mainly sells SUVs and crossovers. Available products are listed below.

=== Leopaard ===
- Leopaard Kylin
- Leopaard C5EV
- Leopaard Feiteng
- Leopaard Q6
- Leopaard CT7
- Leopaard CS3 BEV (缤歌, Bingge)
- Leopaard CS6
- Leopaard CS7
- Leopaard CS9/CS9EV
- Leopaard CS10
- Leopaard Mattu
- Leopaard Coupe
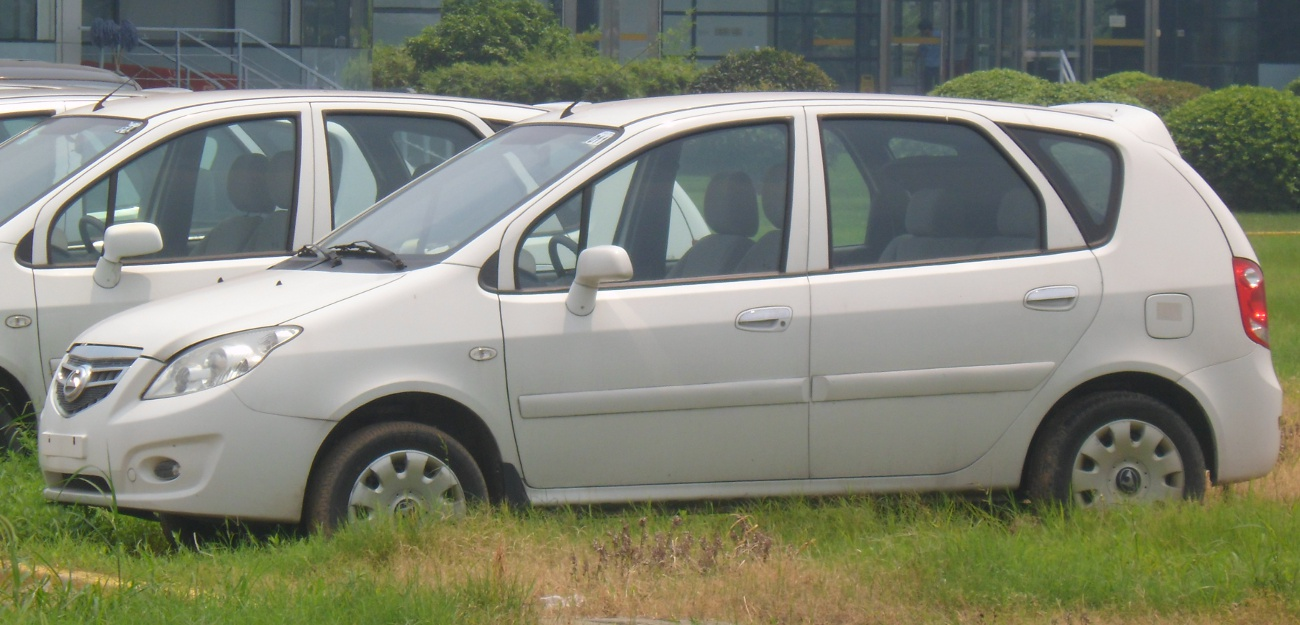
Leopaard Kylin

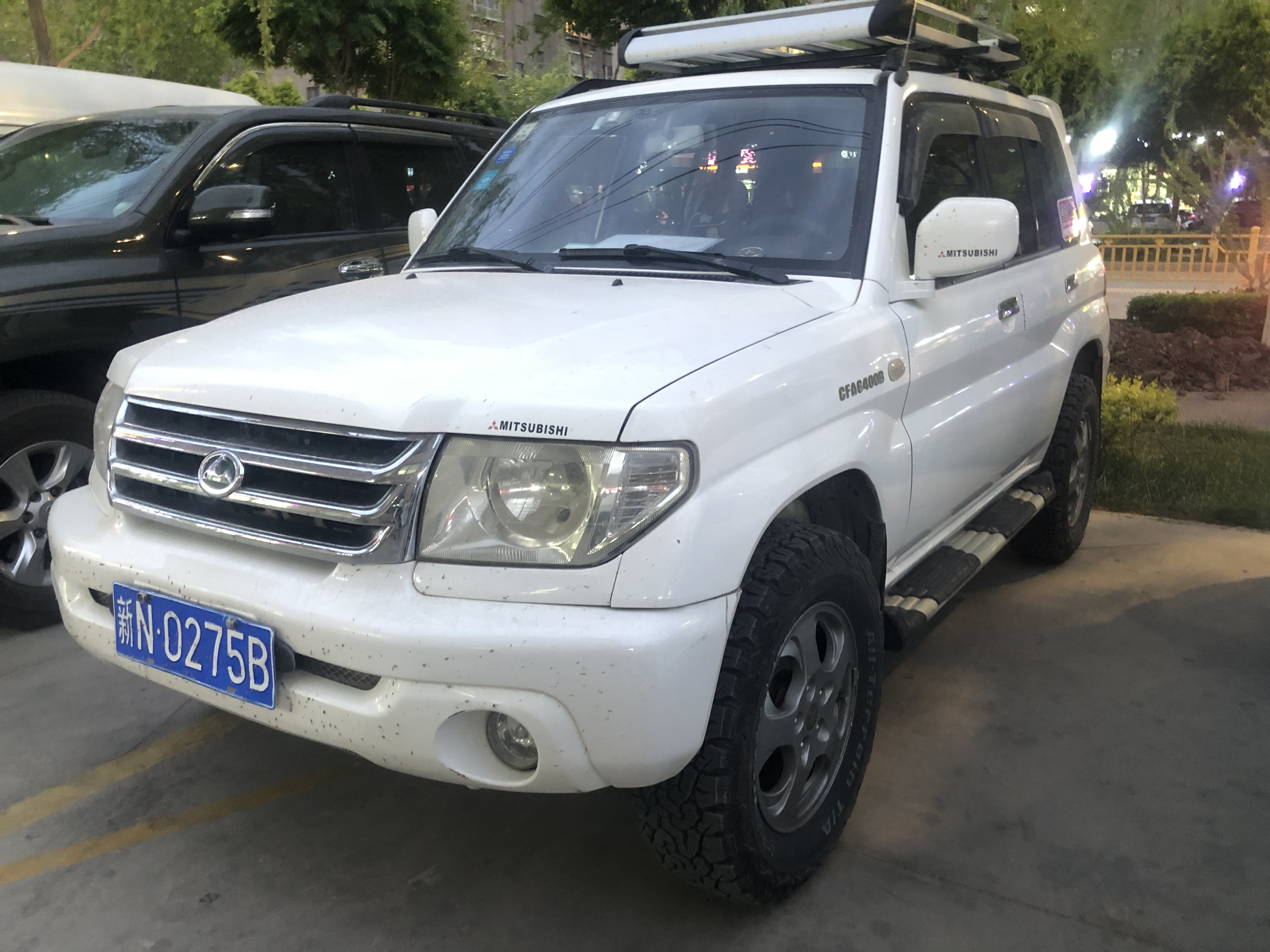
Leopaard Feiteng

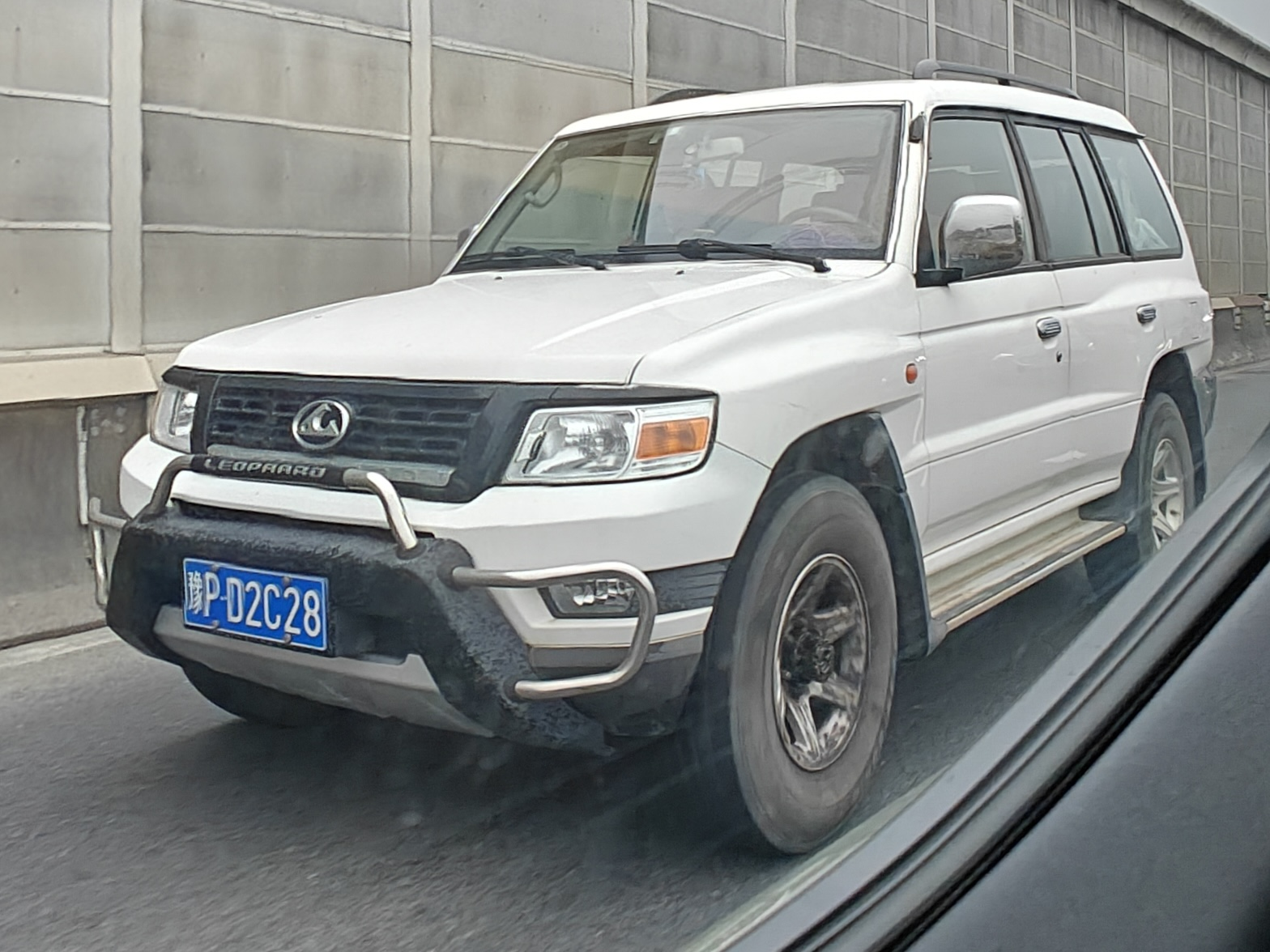
Leopaard Q6

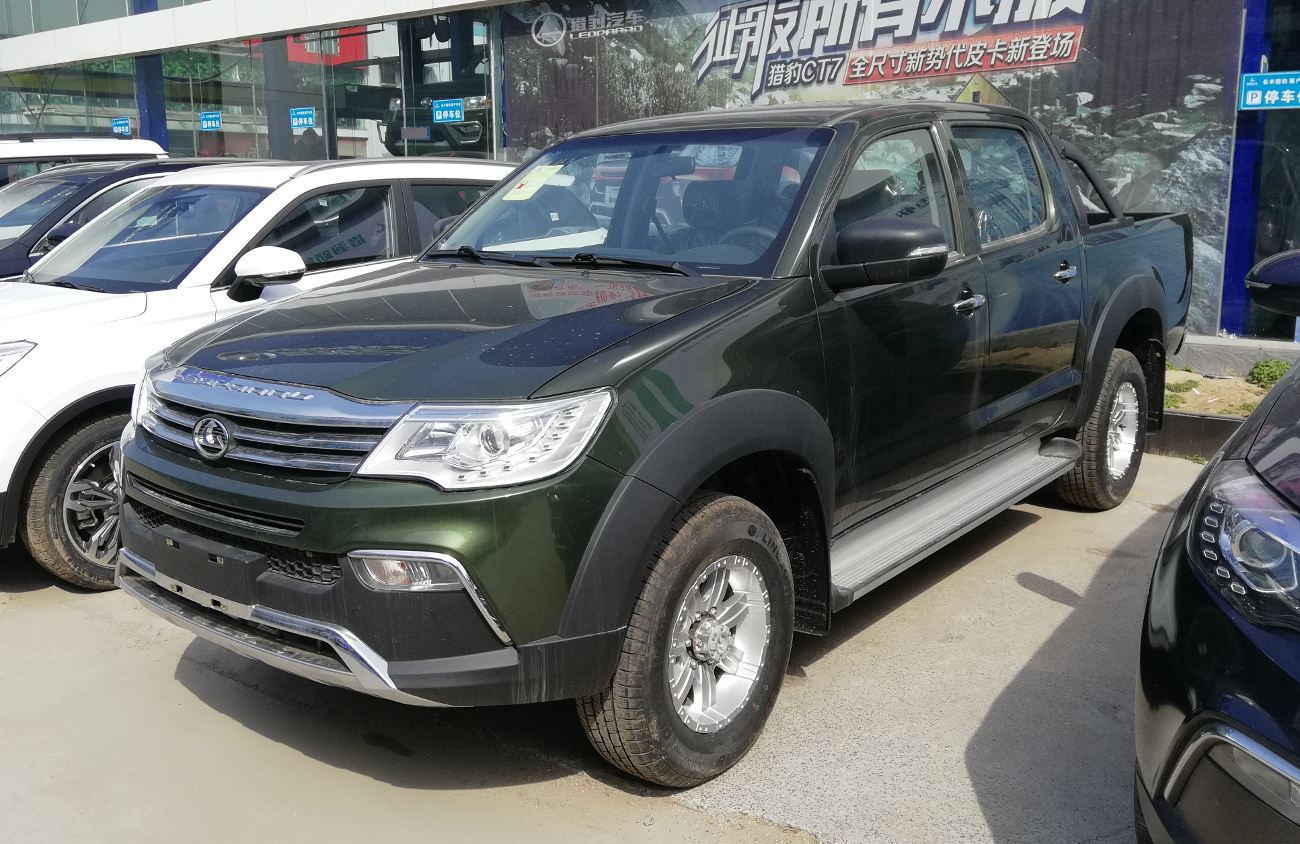
Leopaard CT7

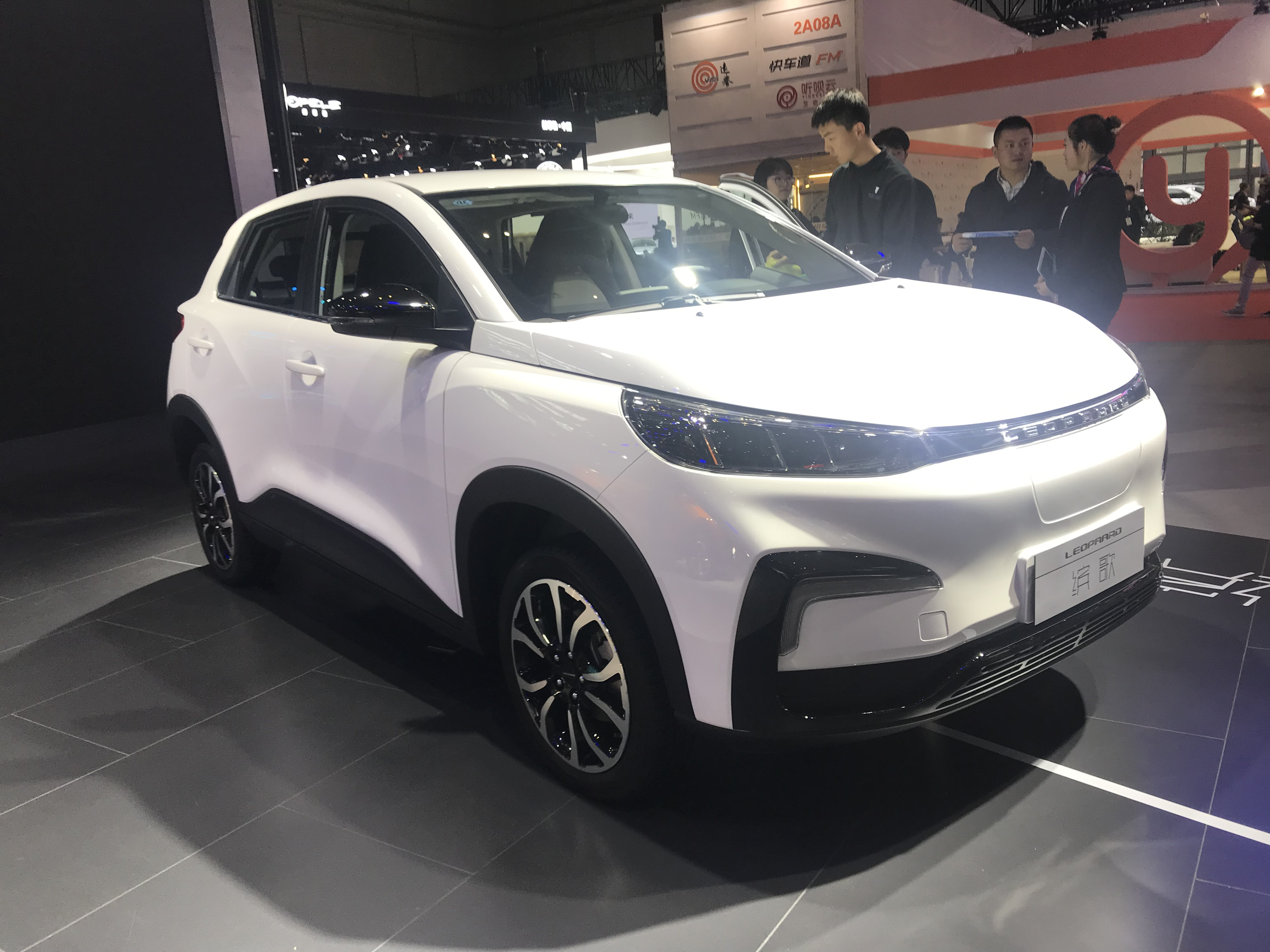
Leopaard CS3 BEV

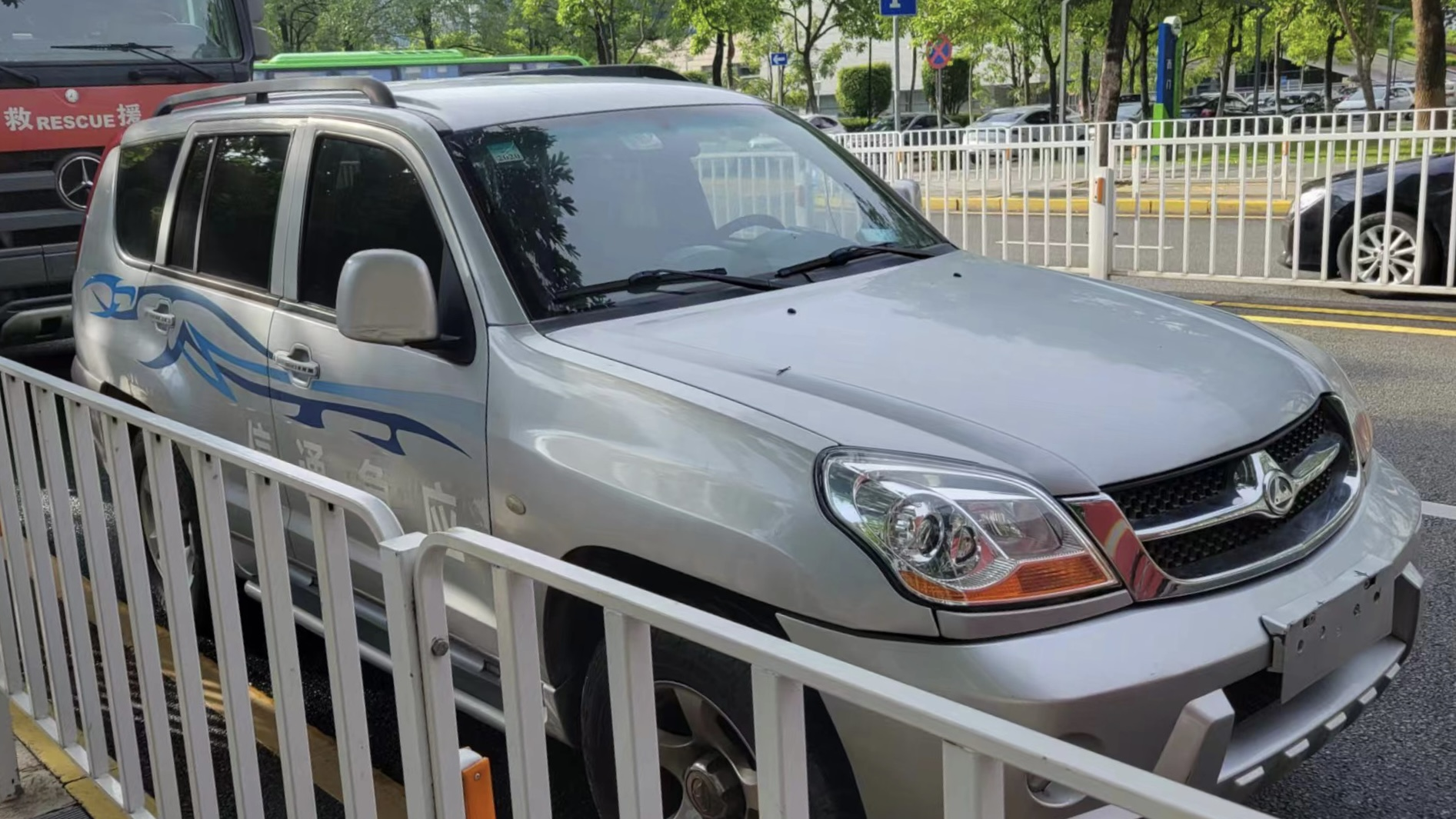
Leopaard CS6

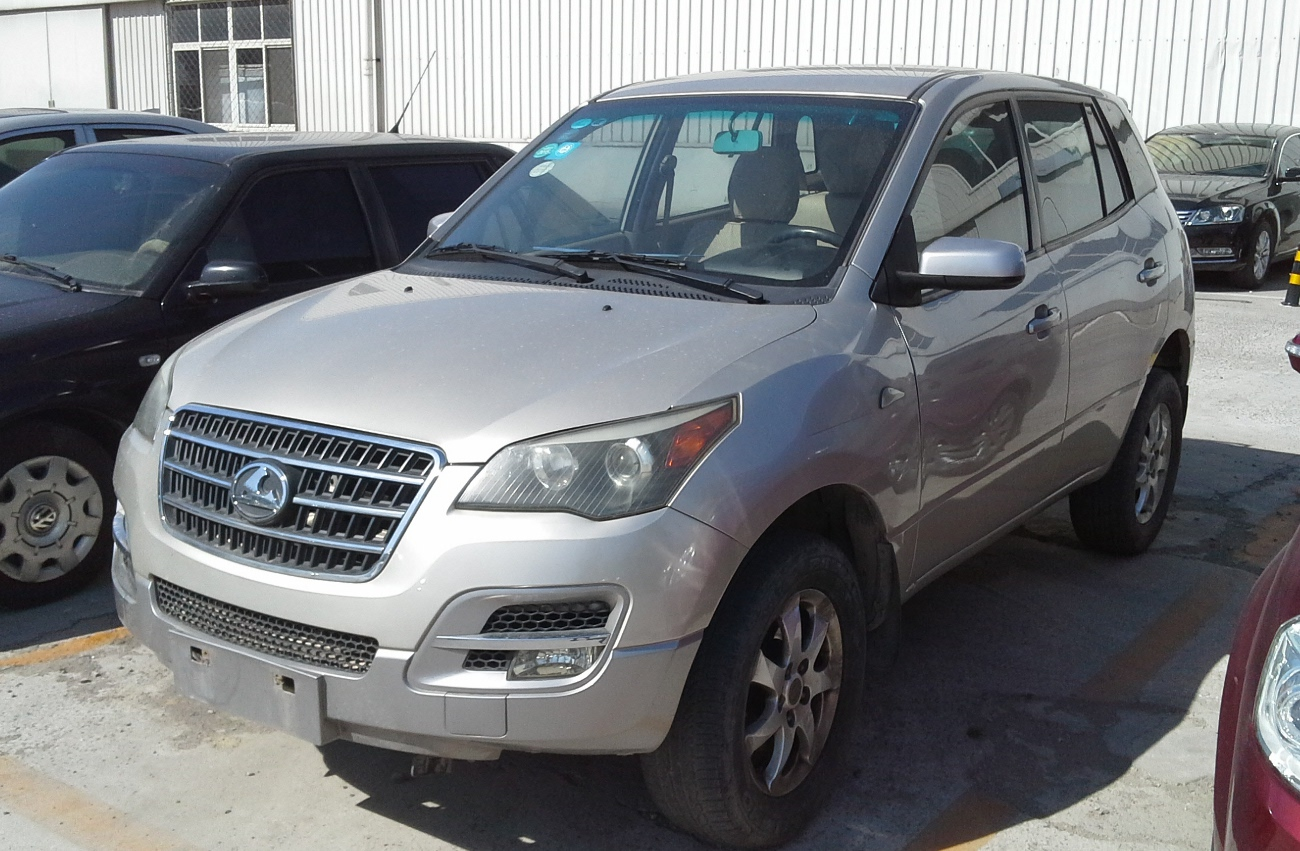
Leopaard CS7

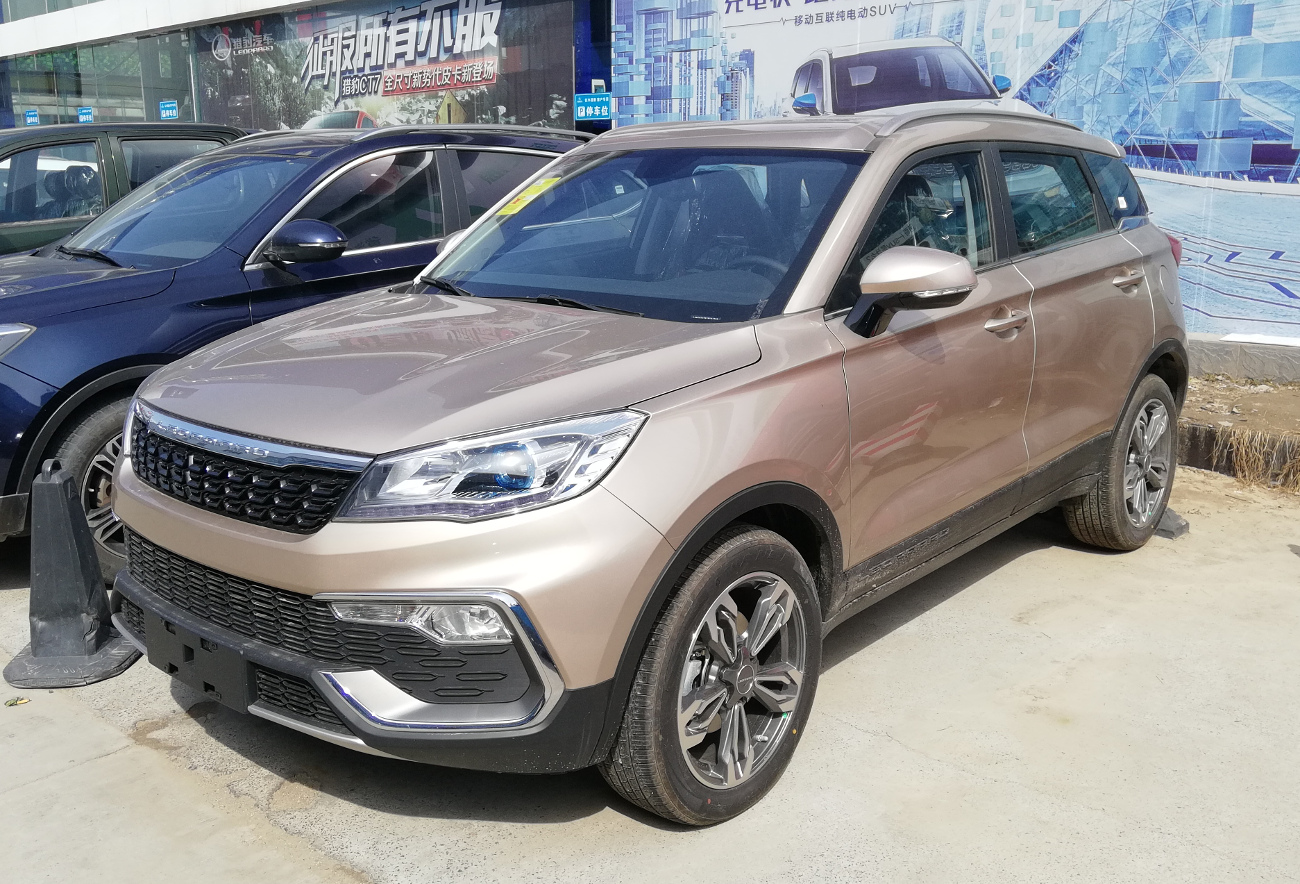
Leopaard CS9

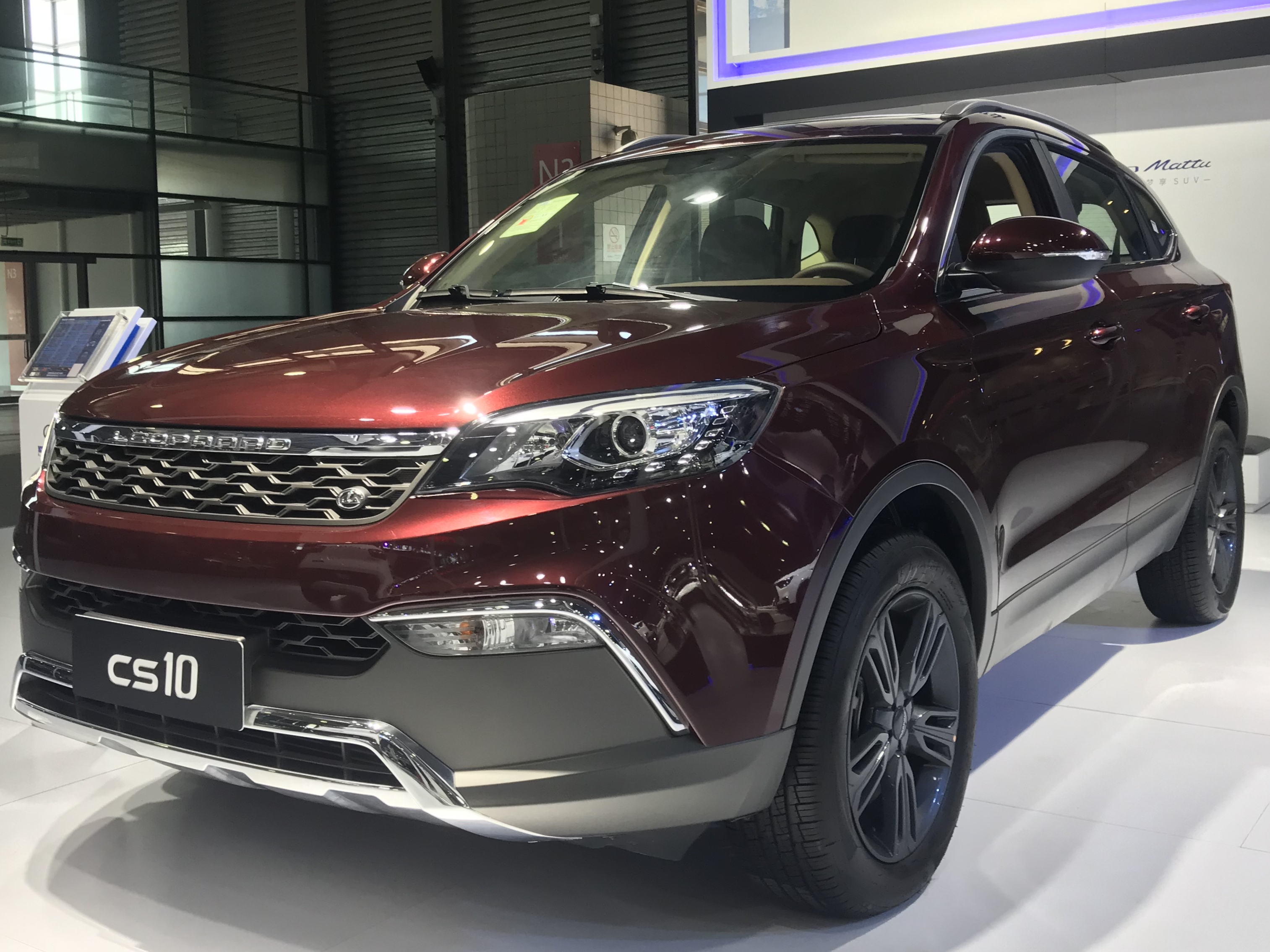
Leopaard CS10

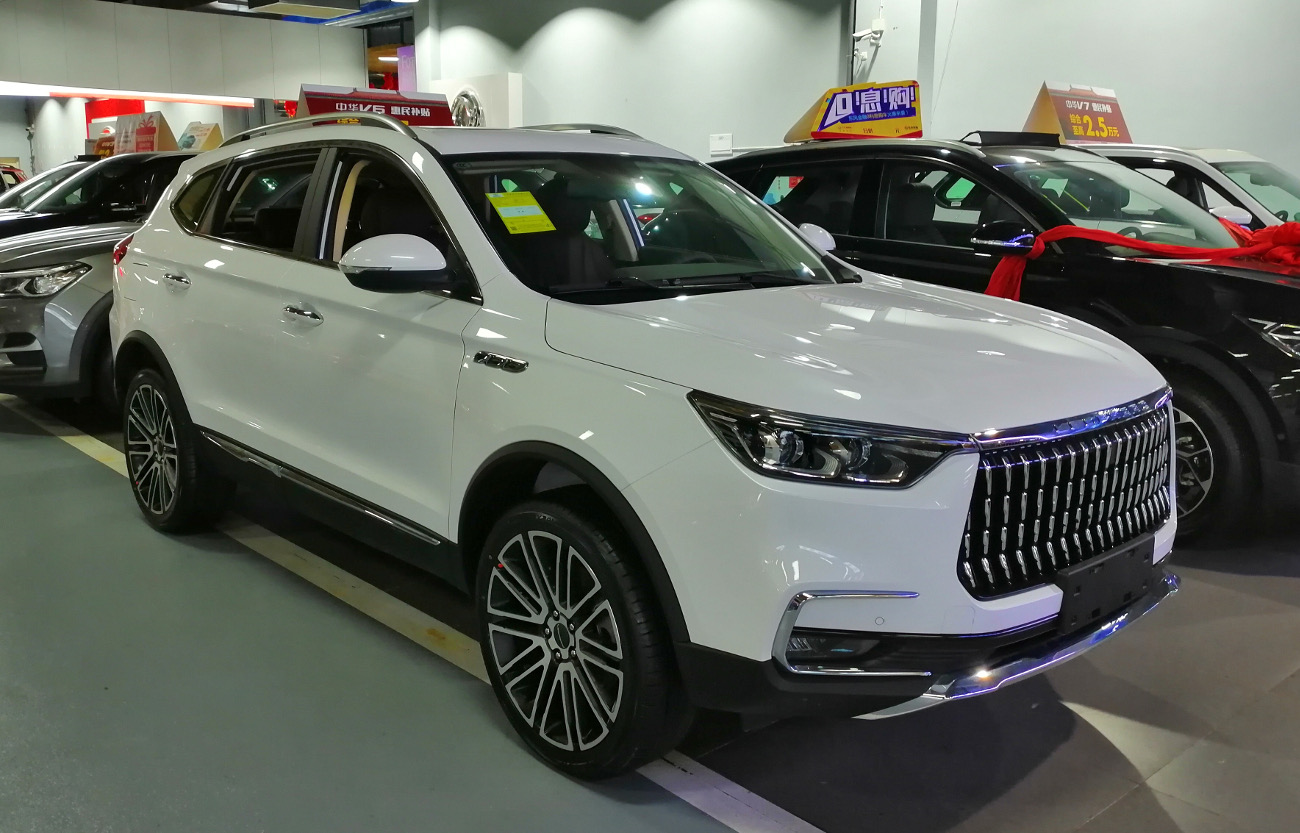
Leopaard Mattu

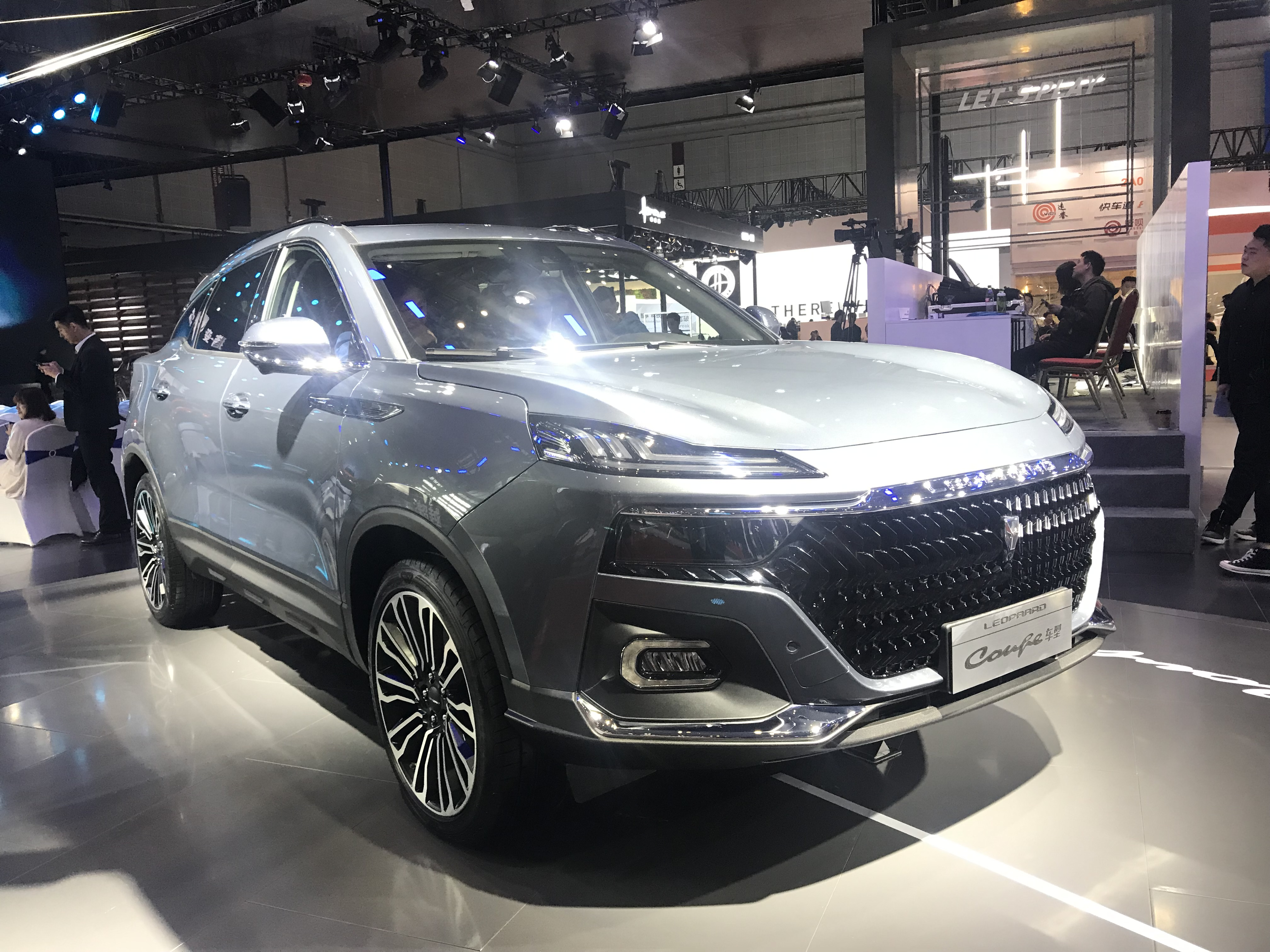
Leopaard Coupe

=== Passenger car ===
The company premiered a concept car at the 2009 Auto Shanghai, and a sedan, the CP2, was revealed at the 2011 Shanghai Autoshow.

- Changfeng Acuman
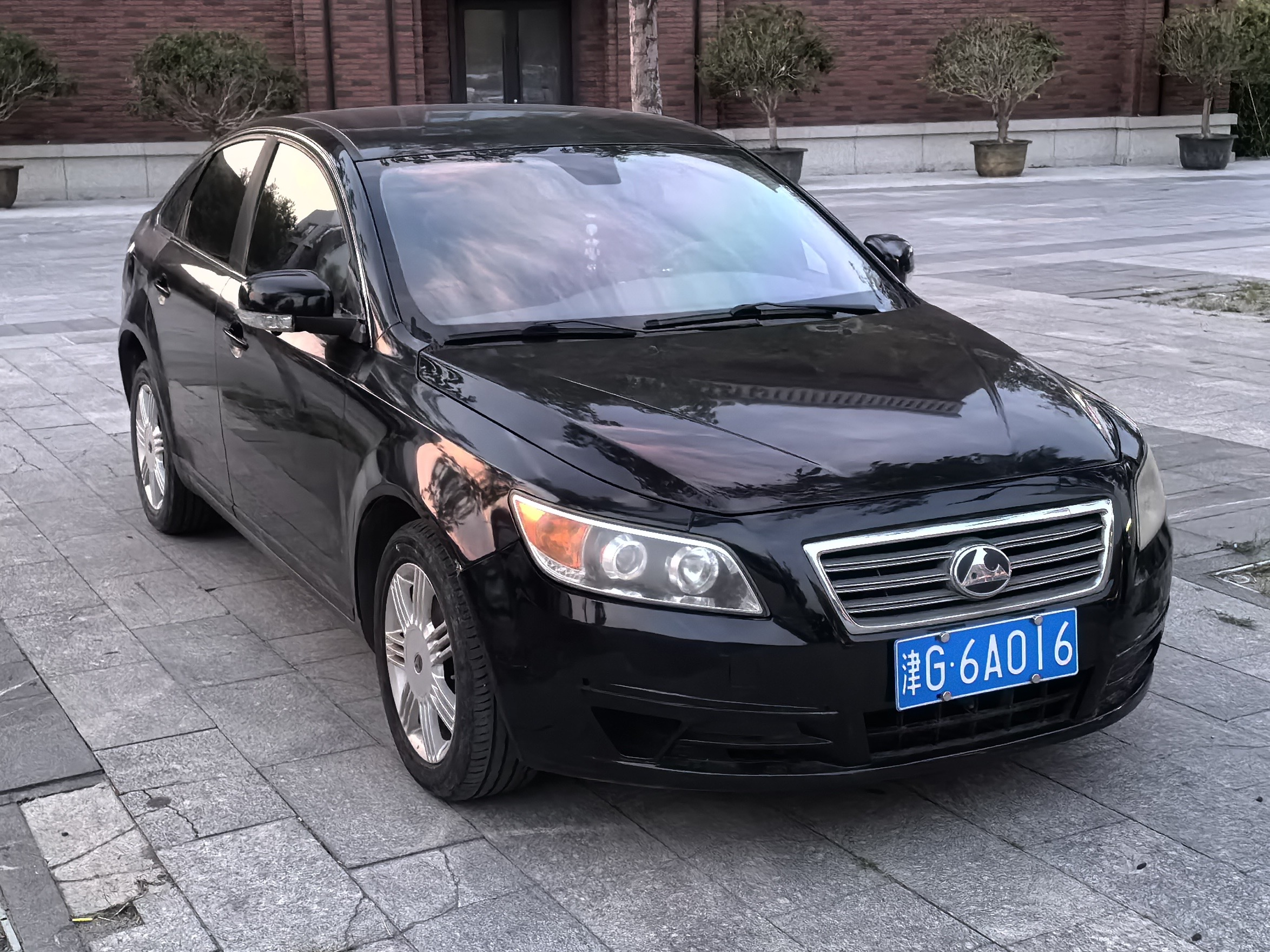
Changfeng Acuman

=== Mitsubishi ===
Since 1995, Changfeng has produced license-built Mitsubishi vehicles for both military and civilian use, and until 2011, this Japanese automaker held 15% ownership of the company.

== Production ==
Changfeng had assembly plants in Yangzi, Anhui province, as well as Changsha and Yongzhou, Hunan province; component factories in Hengyang, Hunan, and in Huizhou, Guangdong province.

=== Export ===
While most of Changfeng's sales were domestic, since 2006 the company had also exported vehicles to Russia, the Southeast Asia, Middle East, and Africa. Such exports are most likely to be of a nominal nature.

== Sales ==
It was reported that the company sold between 30,000 and 50,000 vehicles a year from 2009 to 2011.

State as primary customer

Originally a company associated with the PLA, it has historically manufactured primarily for Chinese state use. As of 2008, most sales, close to seventy percent, were to police, military, and other government agencies.
