= Leopaard CS6 =

Mid-size SUV

Overview
- Manufacturer: GAC Group
- Production: 2007–2014
- Assembly: China: Guangzhou
- Designer: Pininfarina

Body and chassis
- Class: Mid-size SUV
- Body style: 5-door SUV
- Layout: Front-engine, four-wheel drive
- Chassis: Body-on-frame
- Related: Mitsubishi Pajero

Powertrain
- Engine: 2.4 L 4G64 I4
- Transmission: 5-speed manual

Dimensions
- Wheelbase: 2,725 mm (107.3 in)
- Length: 4,980 mm (196.1 in)
- Width: 1,870 mm (73.6 in)
- Height: 1,890 mm (74.4 in)
- Curb weight: 1,875–1,960 kg (4,134–4,321 lb)

The Leopaard CS6 is a mid-size SUV produced by Changfeng Motor for 2007 to 2014 under the Leopaard (猎豹) brand.

== Overview ==
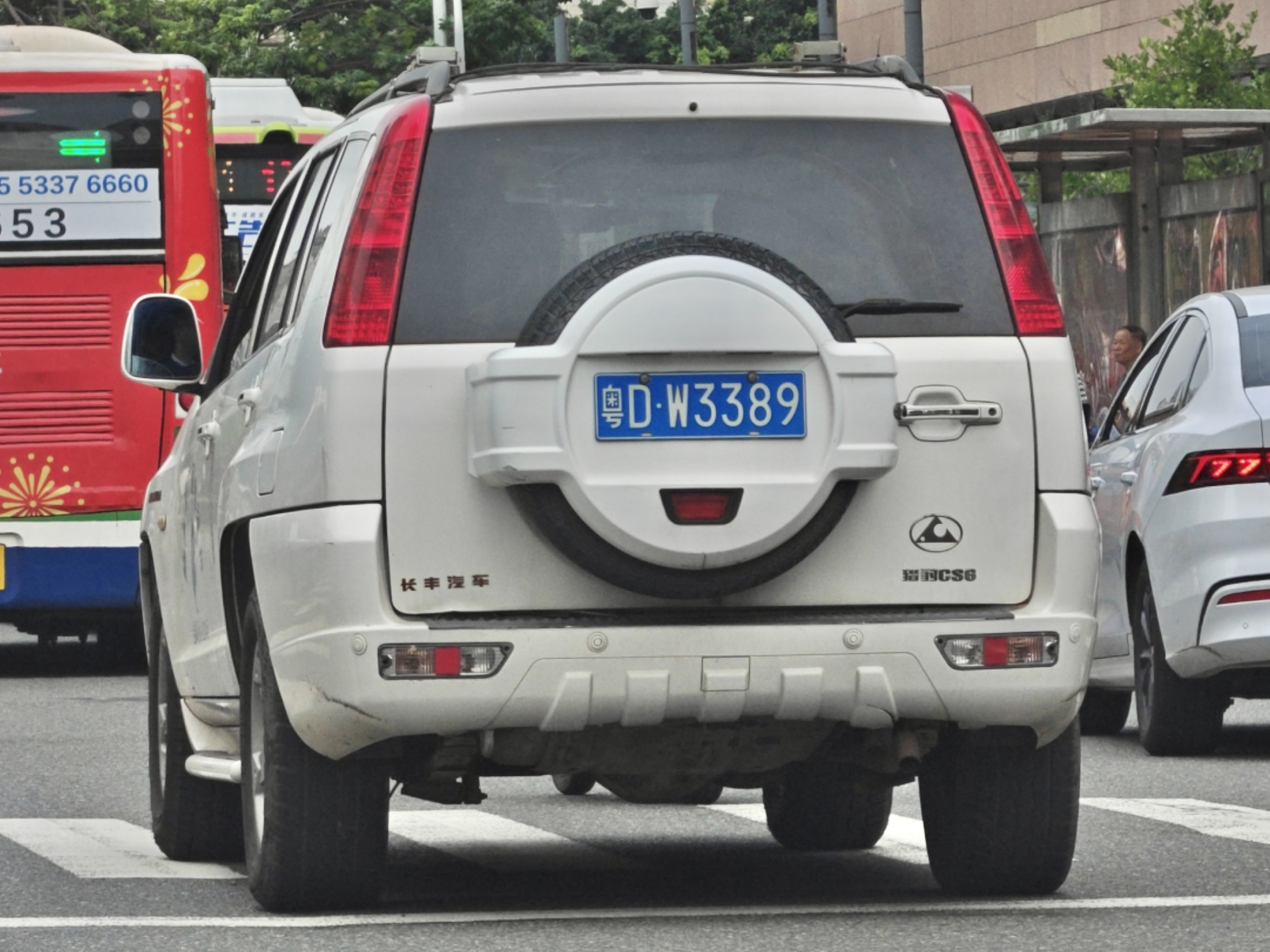
Rear view

The CS6 was built of the platform in the second generation Mitsubishi Pajero with the vehicle design was completed by Pininfarina. The three engines are offered initially, including a 2.5 liter VM R425 diesel engine, and 2.4 liter 4G64S4M and 4G69 engines. The VM R425 diesel was powered features Bosch supplied 2nd generation Common Rail System fuel injection technology producing 105Kw and 340N·m at 2000rpm.

The suspension of the CS6 uses a newly designed three-link coil spring setup. The chassis is built of the new-generation off-road V-series platform. Equipped with a high-performance Eaton locking differential, manually controlled electric IMMOBILIZER four-wheel-drive system, advanced front wheel hub clutches, a ground clearance of 225 mm and a wading depth of 600 mm, the CS6 is an actual off-road capable SUV. The CS6 features active-controlled all-wheel drive technology paired with a BorgWarner transfer case offering four modes (2H, 4H, 4L and N).
