= Leopaard Mattu =

Chinese compact crossover SUV

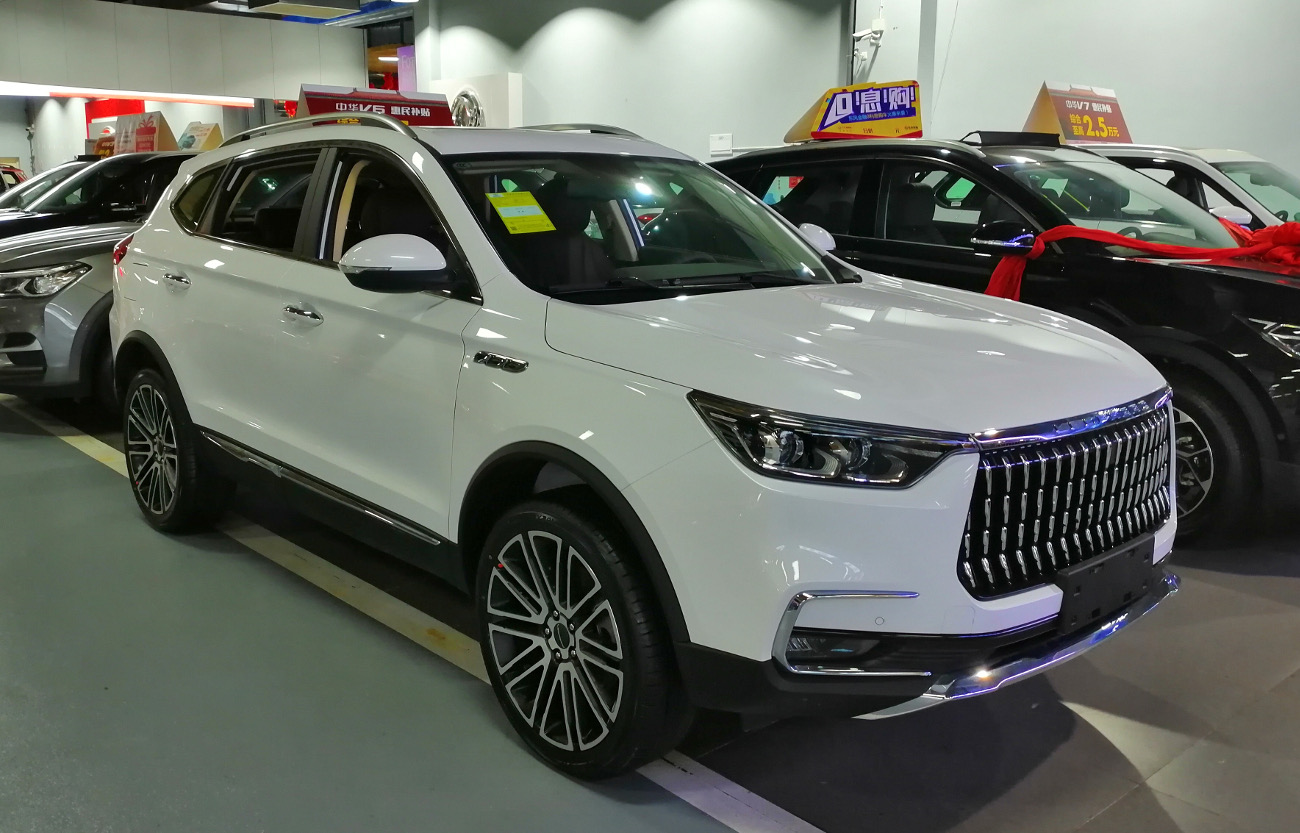

Overview
- Manufacturer: GAC Group
- Also called: Liebao Mattu; Liebao Maitu
- Production: 2017–2020
- Model years: 2018–2020
- Assembly: Guangzhou, China

Body and chassis
- Class: Compact crossover SUV
- Body style: 5-door SUV
- Layout: Front-engine, front-wheel-drive
- Related: Leopaard CS10

Powertrain
- Engine: 1.6 L CE16 I4 (turbo petrol)
- Transmission: 6-speed manual; 6-speed DCT

Dimensions
- Wheelbase: 2,700 mm (106.3 in)
- Length: 4,696 mm (184.9 in)
- Width: 1,906 mm (75.0 in)
- Height: 1,709 mm (67.3 in)

The Leopaard Mattu is a compact crossover SUV produced by Changfeng Motor of GAC Group under the Leopaard brand.

== Overview ==
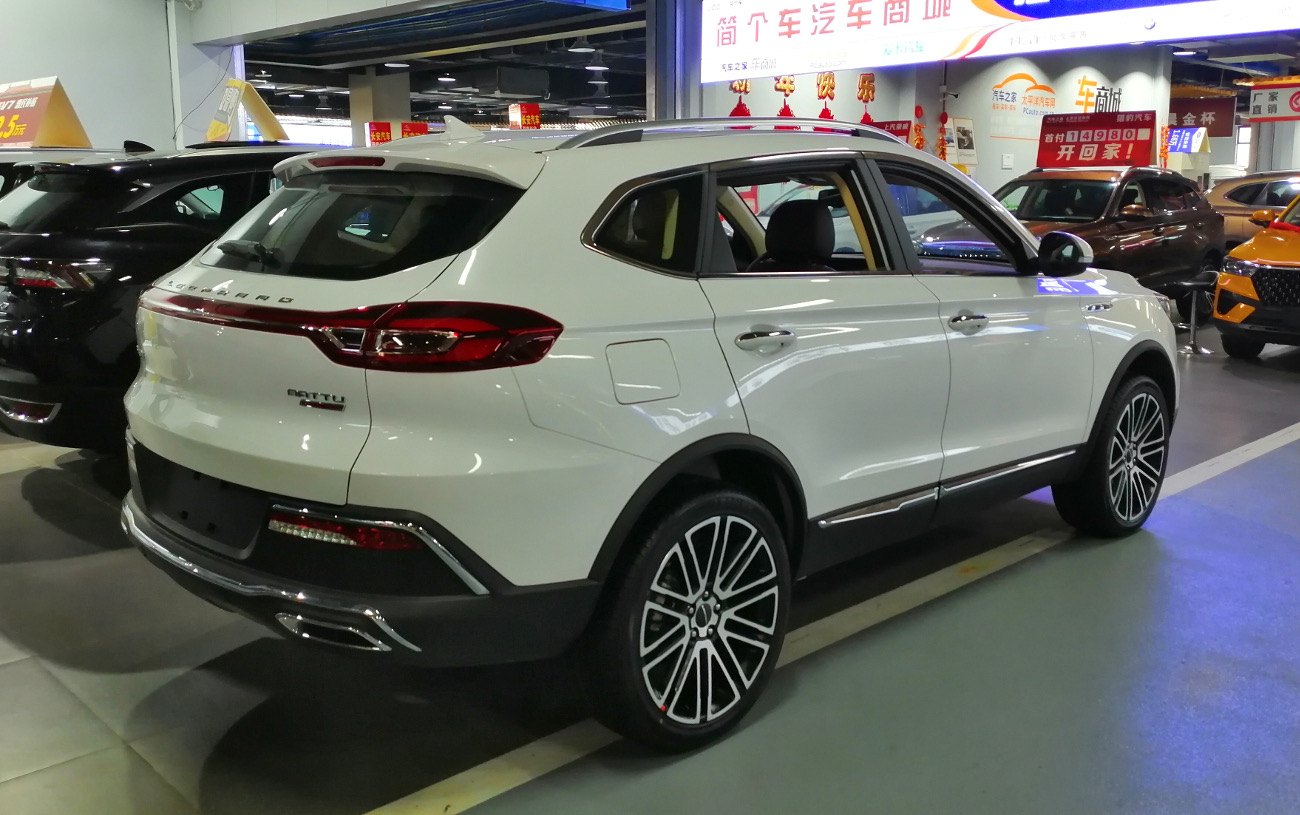
Leopaard Mattu rear

The Leopaard Mattu is based on the same platform as the Leopaard CS10 compact crossover but was aimed to be positioned slightly above as a more premium option with prices ranging from 116,800 to 158,800 yuan.

The Leopaard Mattu is powered by BMW's CE16 1.6-liter turbo direct injection engine with a maximum power of 200 hp and a peak torque of 270 Nm, with the engine mated to either a 6-speed manual transmission or a 6-speed dual-clutch transmission. The Leopaard Mattu features a front MacPherson and the multi-link independent rear suspension.
