= Leopaard CS3 =

Battery electric compact crossover SUV

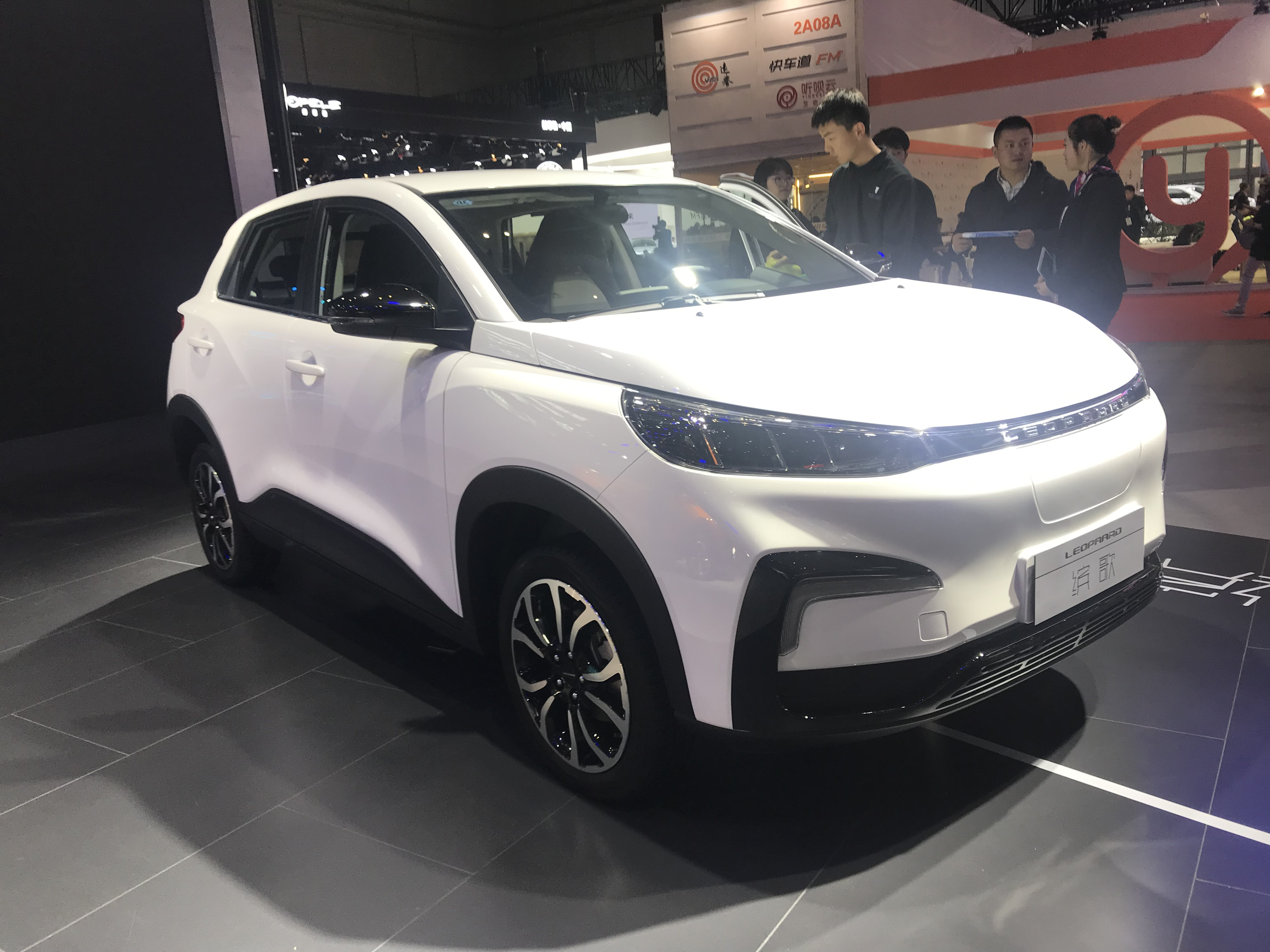
- Leopaard CS3 BEV

Overview
- Manufacturer: GAC Group
- Production: 2019–2020
- Model years: 2020

Body and chassis
- Class: Compact crossover SUV
- Body style: 5-door SUV
- Layout: Front motor, front-wheel drive

Powertrain
- Power output: 50 kW (67 hp; 68 PS)
- Battery: 30.8 kWh
- Electric range: 305 km (190 mi)

Dimensions
- Wheelbase: 2,410 mm (94.9 in)
- Length: 3,845 mm (151.4 in)
- Width: 1,685 mm (66.3 in)
- Height: 1,510 mm (59.4 in)

The Leopaard CS3 is a battery electric compact crossover SUV produced by Changfeng Motor of GAC Group under the Leopaard brand.

== Overview ==
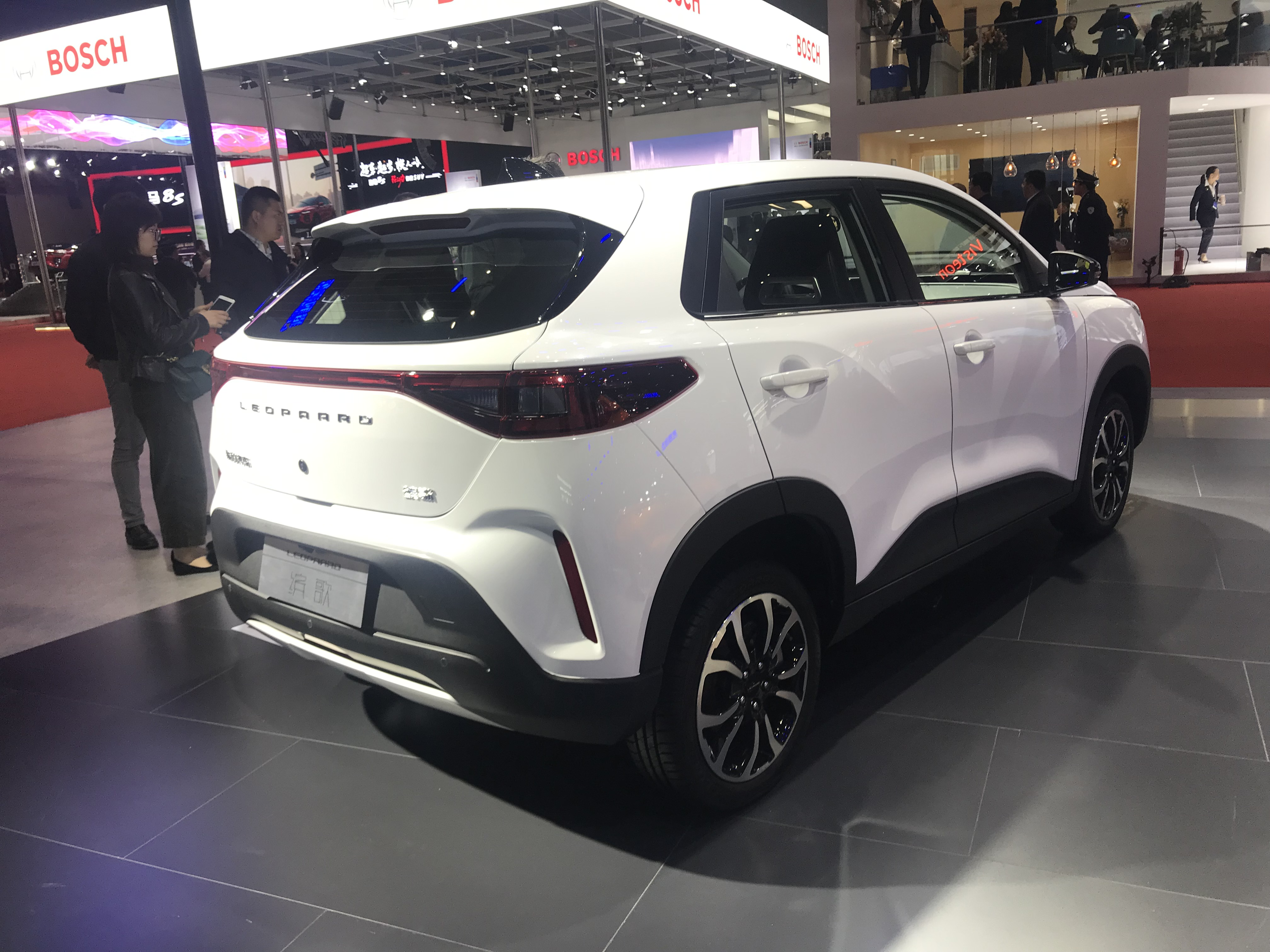
Leopaard CS3 BEV rear

The Leopaard CS3 was originally launched as a concept during the 2018 Beijing Auto Show, and was introduced again during the 2019 Shanghai Auto Show as a prototype with the Chinese name Bingge (缤歌) being revealed at the same time. The CS3 BEV is powered by a 68 hp (50 kW) permanent magnet motor, and in equipped with a battery with a capacity of 30.8kWh. The electric range tested by NEDC is 305 km.

== See also ==
- Chevrolet Bolt
- Xpeng G3
- BYD Yuan
