= Leopaard CS10 =

Chinese compact CUV

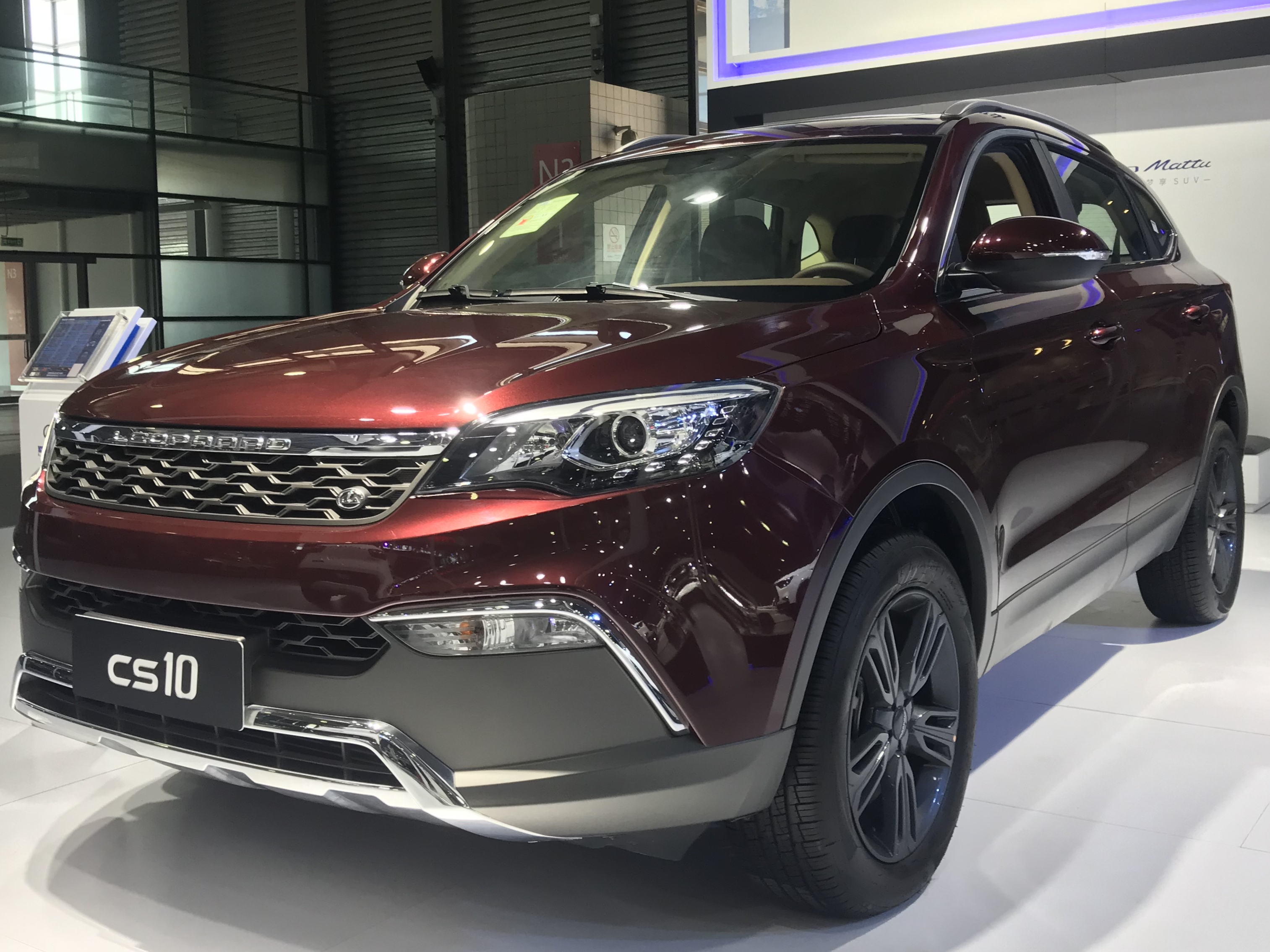

Overview
- Manufacturer: GAC Group
- Also called: Liebao CS10; Liebao Q5; Pyeonghwa Ppeokkugi (North Korea)
- Production: 2014–2020
- Model years: 2015–2020
- Assembly: Guangzhou, China

Body and chassis
- Class: Compact crossover SUV
- Body style: 5-door SUV
- Layout: front-wheel-drive
- Related: Leopaard Mattu

Powertrain
- Engine: 1.5 L 4G15T I4 (turbo petrol); 2.0 L 4G63 I4 (turbo petrol)
- Transmission: 6-speed manual; 5-speed manual; CVT; 6-speed DCT

Dimensions
- Wheelbase: 2,700 mm (106.3 in)
- Length: 4,663 mm (183.6 in)
- Width: 1,875 mm (73.8 in)
- Height: 1,700 mm (66.9 in)

The Leopaard CS10 is a compact crossover SUV produced by Changfeng Motor of GAC Group under the Leopaard brand.

== Overview ==
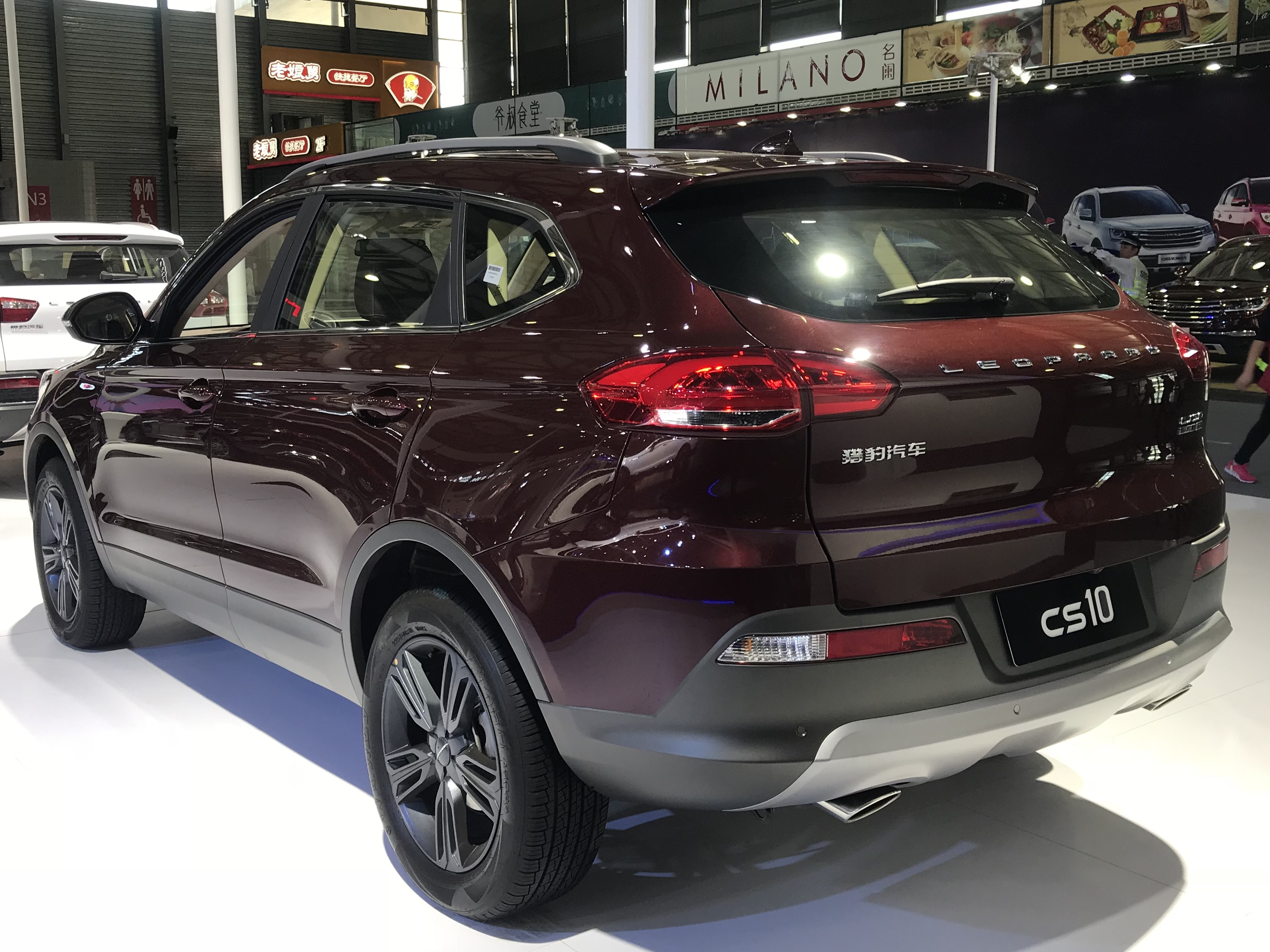
Leopaard CS10 rear

The Leopaard CS10 compact crossover originally debuted as the Changfeng Liebao CS10 concept during the 2014 Beijing Auto Show with the production version debuting during the 2015 Shanghai Auto Show with prices ranging from 89,800 to 146,800 yuan.

The Leopaard CS10 is powered by either a 1.5-liter turbo inline-4 engine producing 150 hp or a 2.0-liter turbo inline-4 engine producing 177 hp. With the 1.5-liter turbo engine mated to either a 5-speed manual transmission or a continuously variable transmission (CVT) and the 2.0-liter turbo engine mated to a 6-speed dual-clutch transmission (DCT).

The Leopaard CS10 features a front MacPherson and the multi-link independent rear suspension.
