= Pajero =

Pajero may refer to:

== Vehicles ==
- Mitsubishi Pajero, a 1981–2021, and 2026–present Japanese full-size SUV
  - Mitsubishi Pajero Evolution, a 1984–2007 Japanese racing SUV and a 1997–1999 performance SUV
- Mitsubishi Pajero Sport, a 1996–present Japanese mid-size SUV
- Mitsubishi Pajero Junior, a 1995–1998 Japanese mini SUV
- Mitsubishi Pajero iO, a 1998–2015 Japanese mini SUV
- Mitsubishi Pajero Mini, a 1994–2012 Japanese kei SUV

== Other uses ==
- Pajero Group, a 1994 Pakistani action and musical film
- Leopardus pajeros, subspecies of the pampas cat, a small wild cat native to South America and the namesake of the Mitsubishi Pajero
