= Mitsubishi Pajero Mini =

Mini SUV classed as a kei car

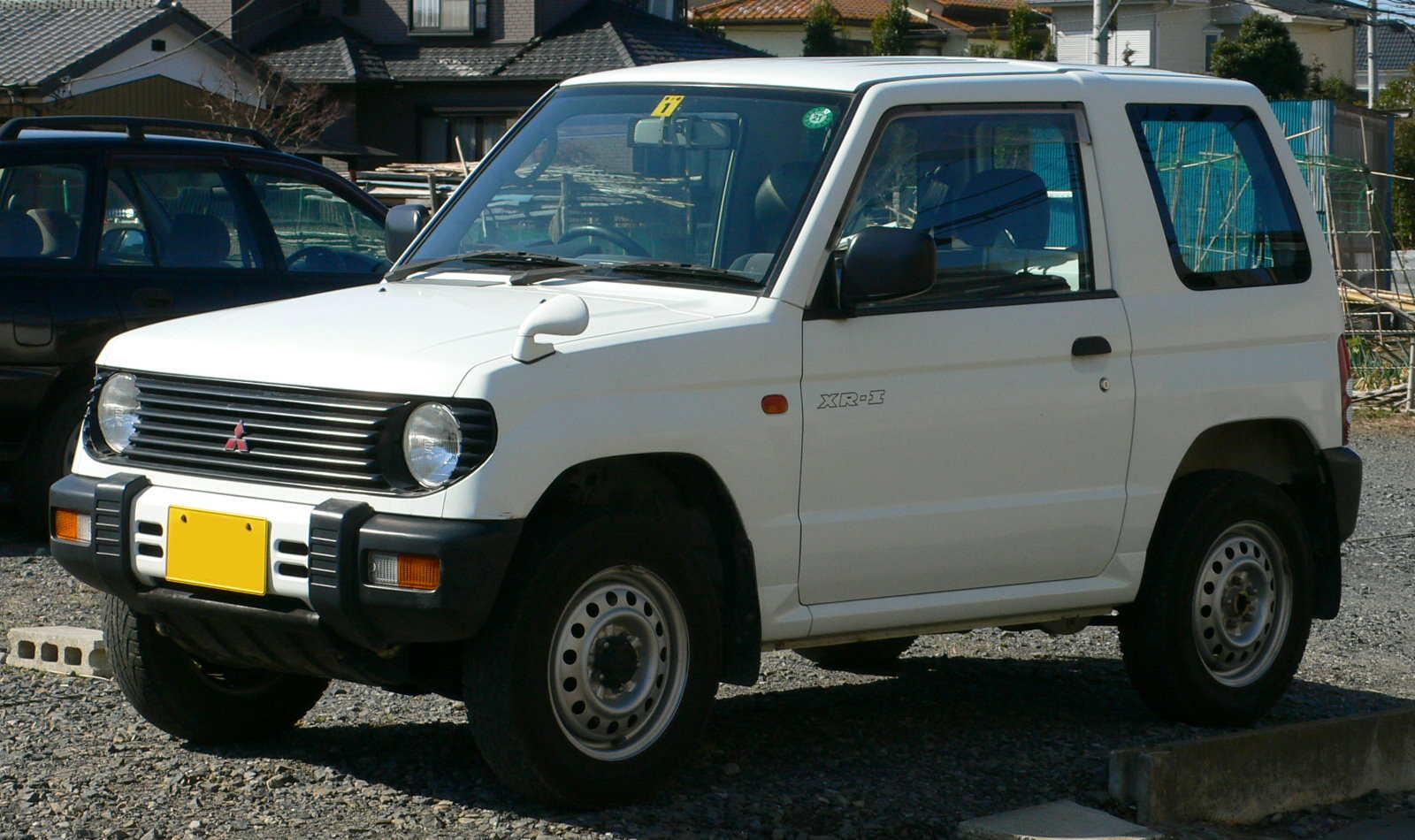

Overview
- Manufacturer: Mitsubishi Motors
- Also called: Nissan Kix (2008–2012)
- Production: 1994–2012
- Assembly: Japan: Kurashiki, Okayama (Mizushima plant)

Body and chassis
- Class: Kei car
- Body style: 3-door SUV
- Layout: Front-engine, rear-wheel-drive; Front-engine, four-wheel-drive
- Chassis: Unibody

Chronology
- Successor: Mitsubishi eK X (indirect)

The Mitsubishi Pajero Mini (Japanese: 三菱・パジェロミニ, Hepburn: Mitsubishi Pajero Mini) is a kei car produced by Mitsubishi Motors from December 1994 until June 2012.

== Overview ==
Based on the platform of the Minica, the Pajero Mini was styled as a miniature version of the company's successful Pajero sport utility vehicle, in response to the SUV craze of the late 1980s and early 1990s. Compared to the full-sized original, the kei vehicle was considerably smaller and was fitted with 660 cc four-cylinder gasoline engines.

The popularity of the vehicle inspired Mitsubishi to create several limited editions, including the "Iron Cross", "Desert Cruiser", "White Skipper" and "Duke".

== First generation (1994; H51/56A) ==
First generation
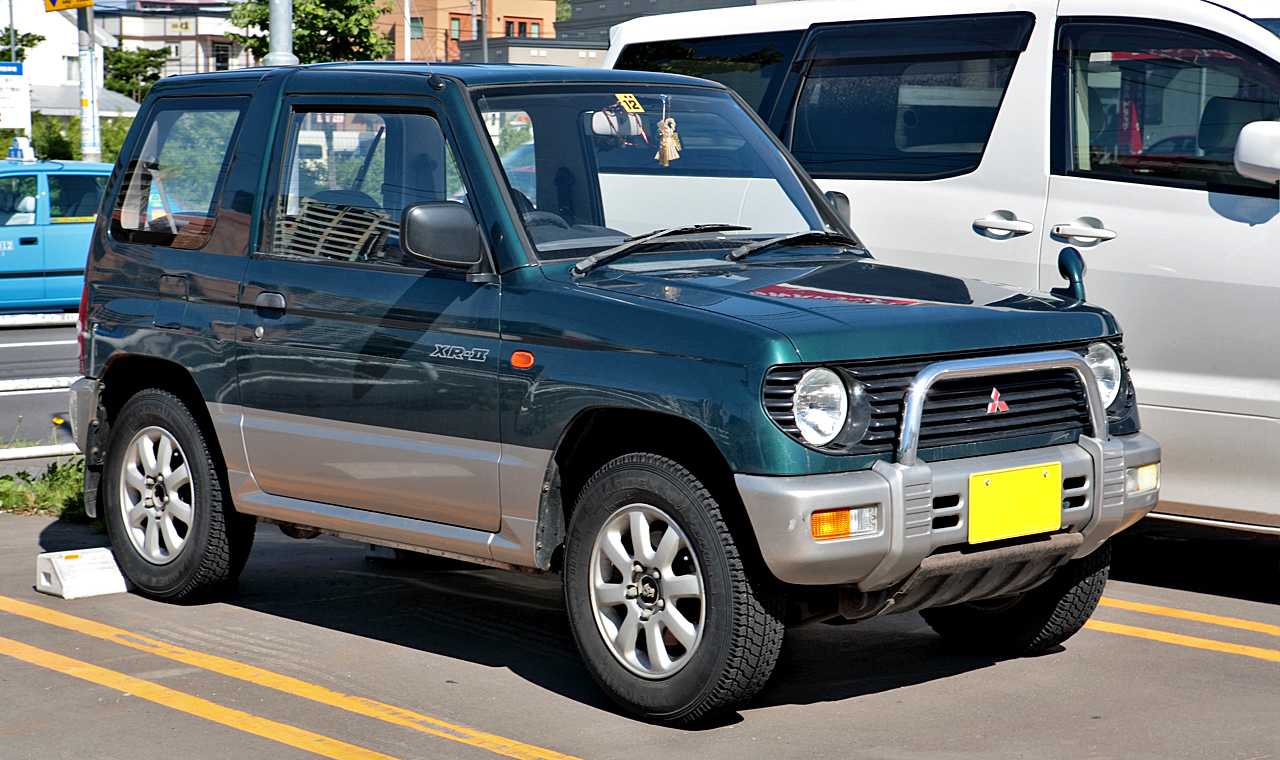
- Mitsubishi Pajero Mini XR-II

Overview
- Model code: H51/56A
- Production: 1994–1998

Body and chassis
- Related: Mitsubishi Pajero Junior

Powertrain
- Engine: 659 cc 4A30 16V I4; 659 cc 4A30T 20V turbo DOHC I4
- Transmission: 5-speed manual 3/4-speed automatic

Dimensions
- Wheelbase: 2,200 mm (86.6 in)
- Length: 3,295 mm (129.7 in)
- Width: 1,395 mm (54.9 in)
- Height: 1,630 mm (64.2 in)
- Curb weight: 780–930 kg (1,720–2,050 lb)

The original Pajero Mini was first presented in December 1994. It was available with a choice of naturally aspirated or turbocharged 659 cc four-cylinder engines with 52 or 64 PS (38 or 47 kW). Two- or four-wheel drive were available, with 2WD models receiving the H51A model code and four-wheel drives being H56A. The four-wheel-drive model outsold the two-wheel-drive Pajero Mini at a rate of at least 6 to 1. A larger-engined version with a wider track (and correspondingly larger fender flares) was presented in October 1995; this was sold as the Mitsubishi Pajero Junior. The turbocharged models were VR-I or VR-II depending on equipment levels, while the naturally aspirated versions were called XR-I and XR-II. The "-I" versions received little standard equipment and can easily be recognized by their steel wheels, black bumpers and other trim such as door handles and rear view mirrors, and minimal brightwork. The more expensive -II models were usually painted two-tone and often receive alloy wheels and various pieces of chrome trim.

In May 1996, the Pajero Mini "Skipper", a special version for urban and town use, was released. The name is a reference to Mitsubishi's Minica Skipper kei car coupé of the early 1970s. In December 1997, the Pajero Mini Duke was released. This had a somewhat more rugged appearance, including sturdy cladding along the sides and a grille with upright bars, a reference to Jeeps and Mitsubishi's history of license manufacturing the CJ-3B for four-and-a-half decades.

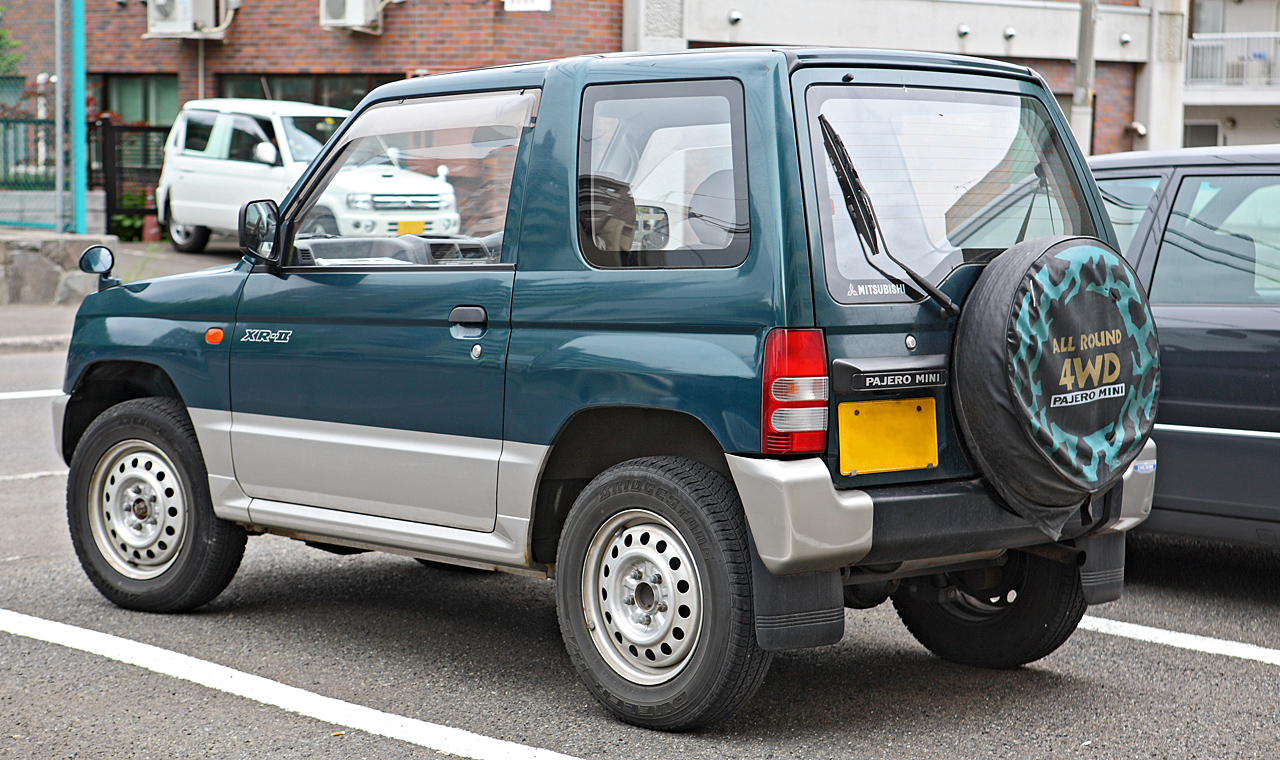
Rear view

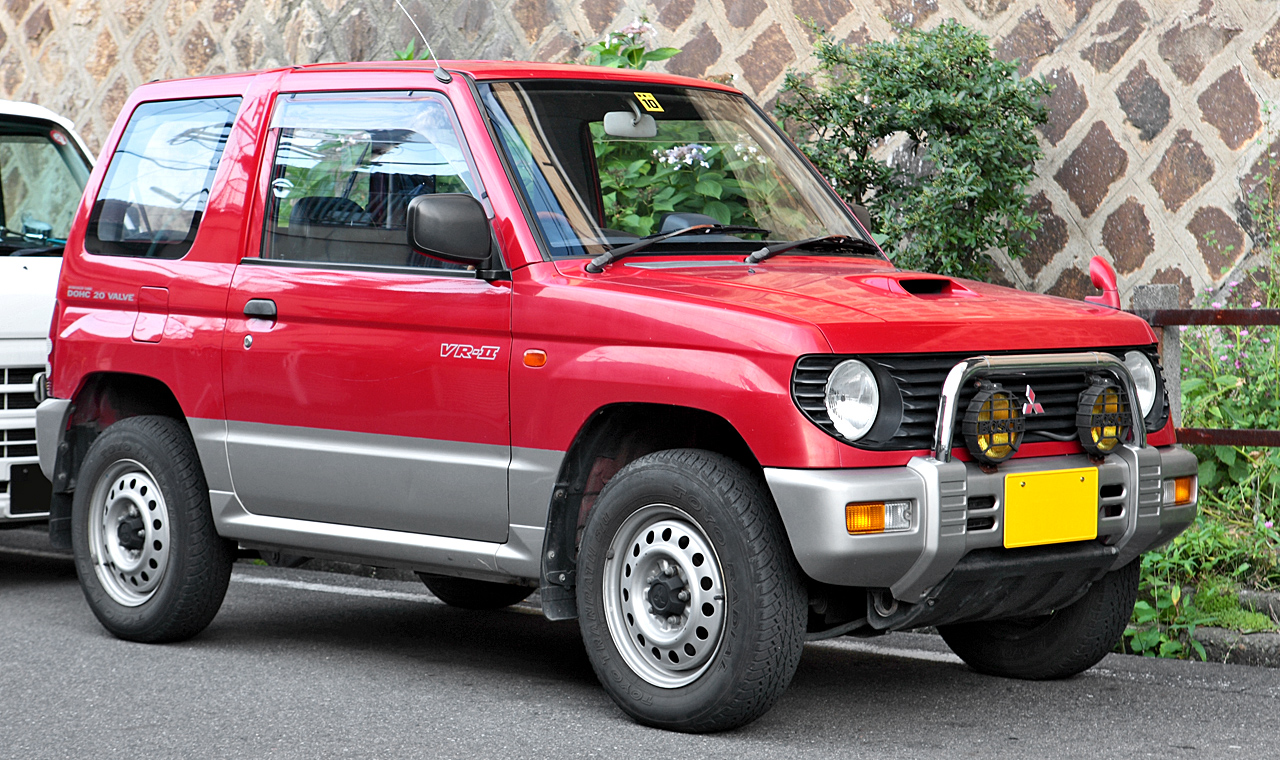
Pajero Mini VR-II (turbo); this model is easily recognized by its hood scoop

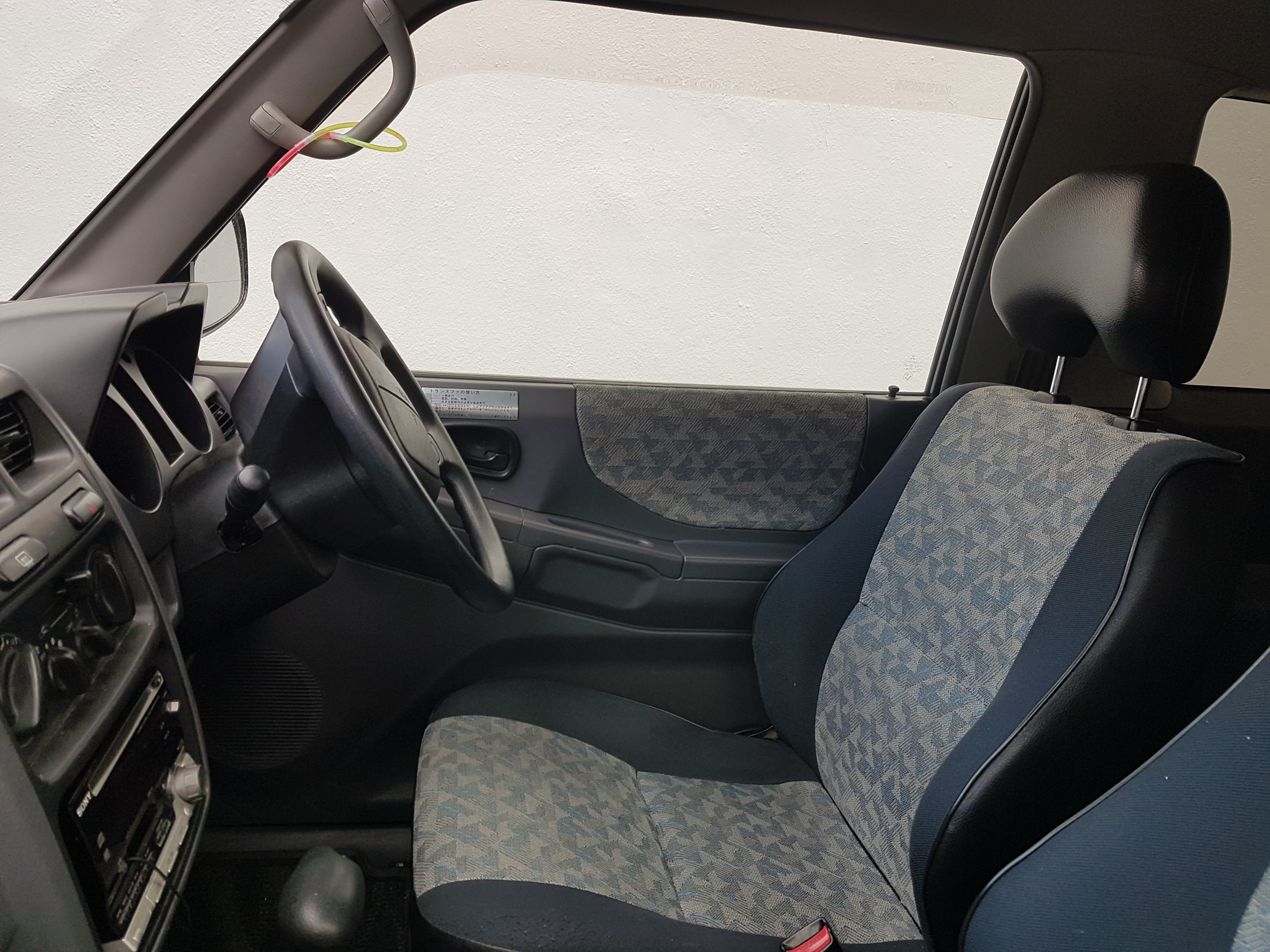
Interior (XR-II)

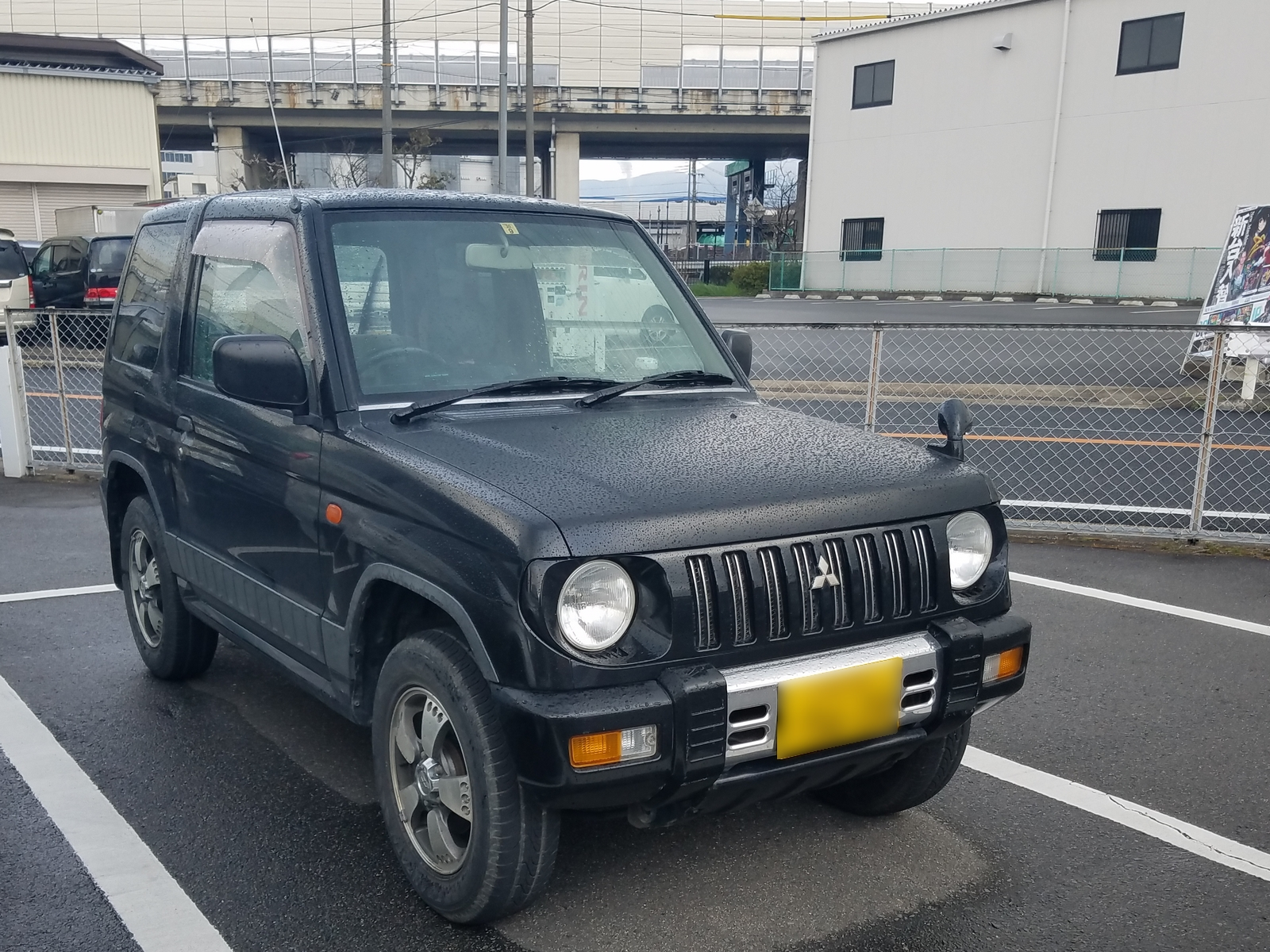
A Pajero Mini Duke X-I

== Second generation (1998; H53/58A) ==
Second generation
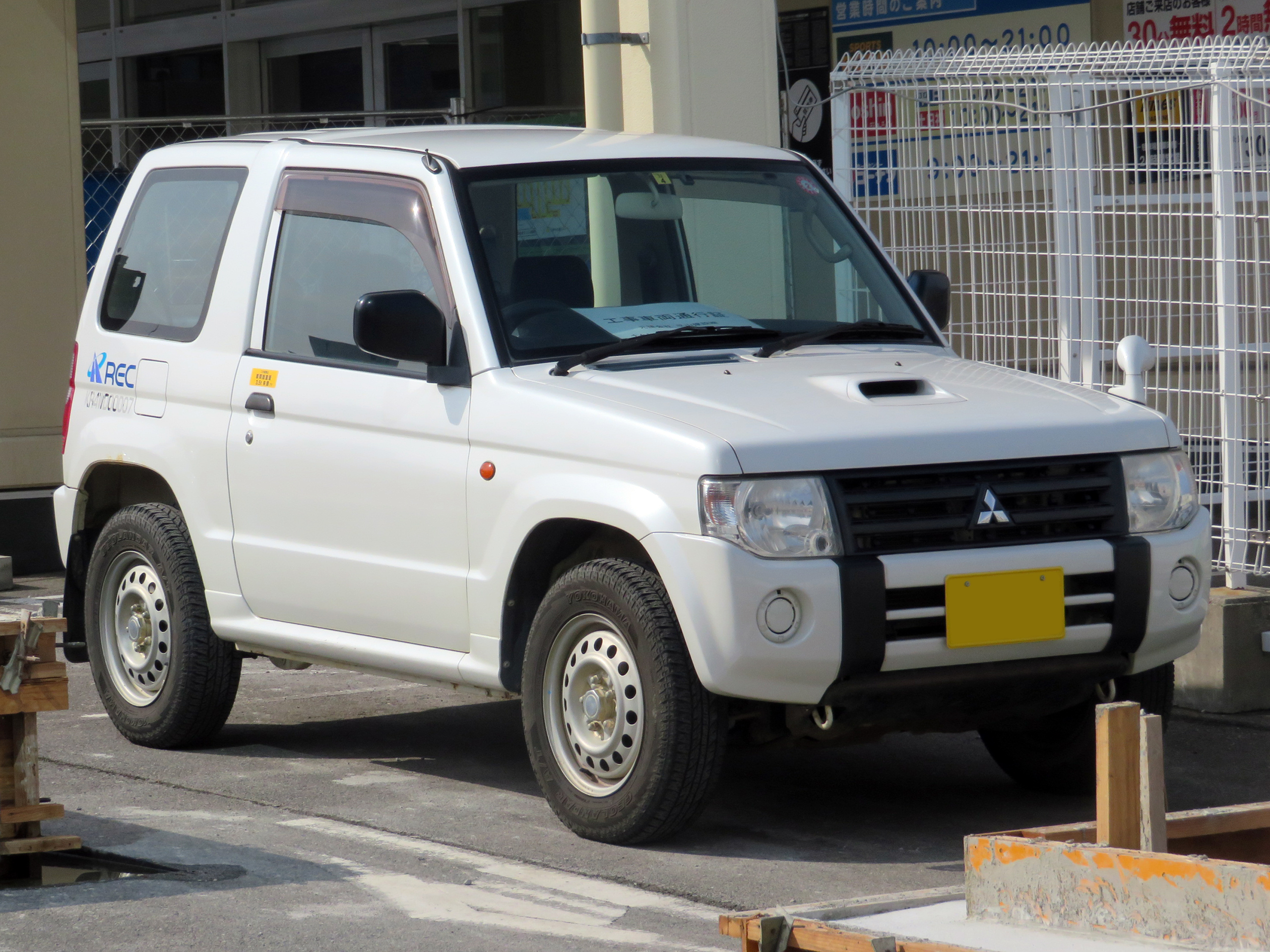
- 2008 Mitsubishi Pajero Mini Limited (third facelift)

Overview
- Model code: H53/58A
- Also called: Nissan Kix (2008–2012)
- Production: October 1998–June 2012

Powertrain
- Engine: 659 cc 4A30 16V I4; 659 cc 4A30T MVV 16V turbo I4; 659 cc 4A30T 20V turbo DOHC I4
- Transmission: 5-speed manual 4-speed automatic

Dimensions
- Wheelbase: 2,200 mm (86.6 in)
- Length: 3,395 mm (133.7 in)
- Width: 1,475 mm (58.1 in)
- Height: 1,635 mm (64.4 in)
- Curb weight: 820–990 kg (1,808–2,183 lb)

In October 1998, the kei car regulations were again updated, and the Pajero Mini was widened and lengthened accordingly at the same time. The "Duke" special model was carried over; it now received a larger, deeper set grille with vertical rather than horizontal bars. Two- or four-wheel drive were once again available, with 2WD models receiving the H53A model code and four-wheel drives being H58A (H57A had been used for the Pajero Junior; that model was never available with two-wheel drive, but H52A was skipped nonetheless). The Lynx grade, features a four round headlights was added in November 2000.

The Pajero Mini received the first facelift on September 2003. The biggest change is the completely redesigned front fascia. The Duke variant was discontinued while a new VR-S variant was introduced.

The Pajero Mini received its third refresh in September 2008. These changes focus on the front fascia which has been redesigned to resemble the larger Pajero. Another major change focuses on the Interior and the redesigned taillights. The Pajero Mini was sold at a specific retail chain called Galant Shop.

Production of the Mitsubishi Pajero Mini ended in June 2012.

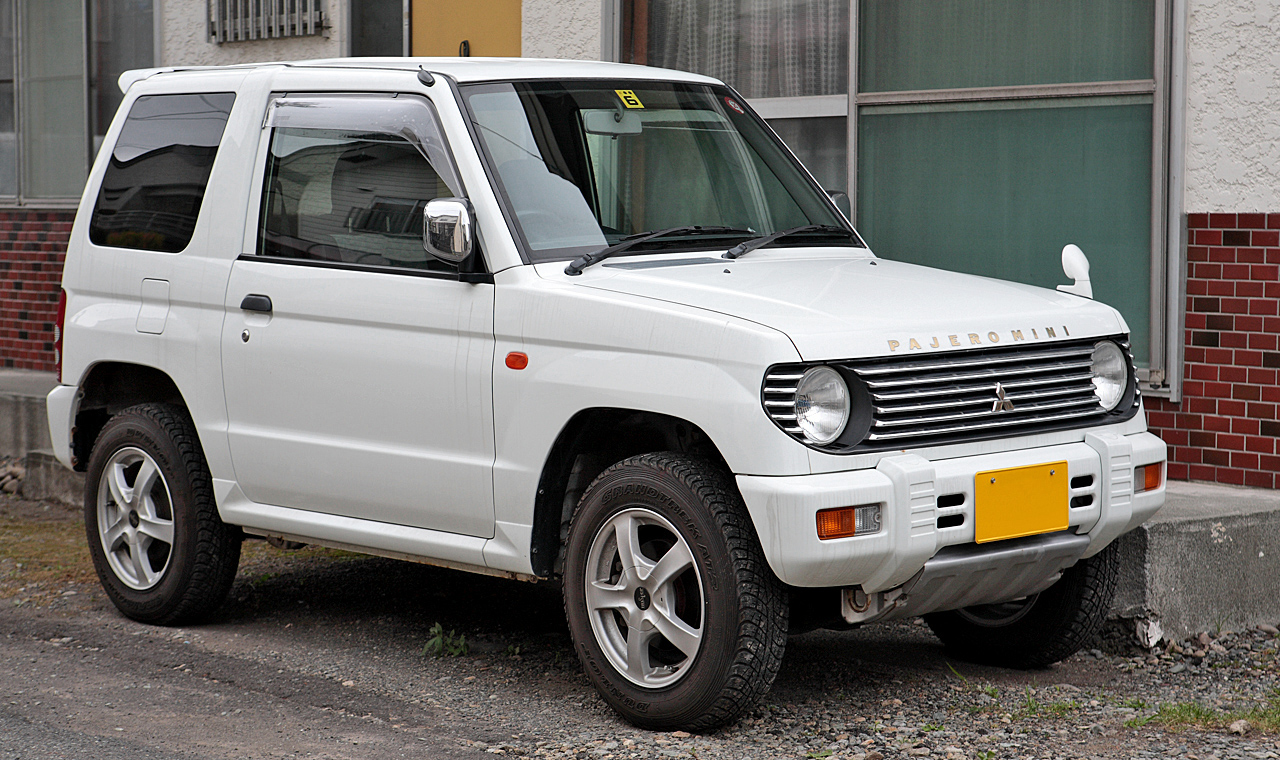
1998 Mitsubishi Pajero Mini Front

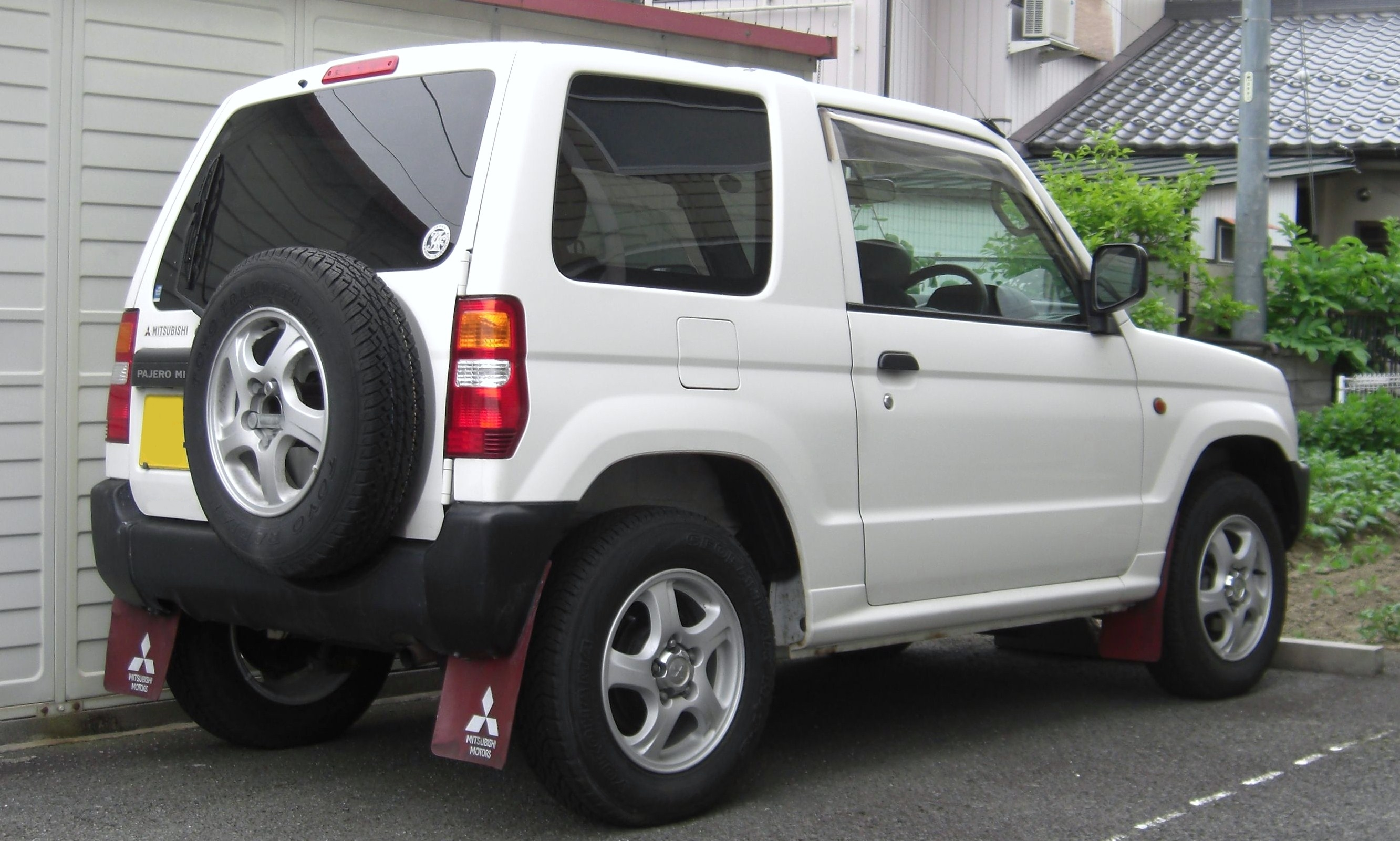
Rear view

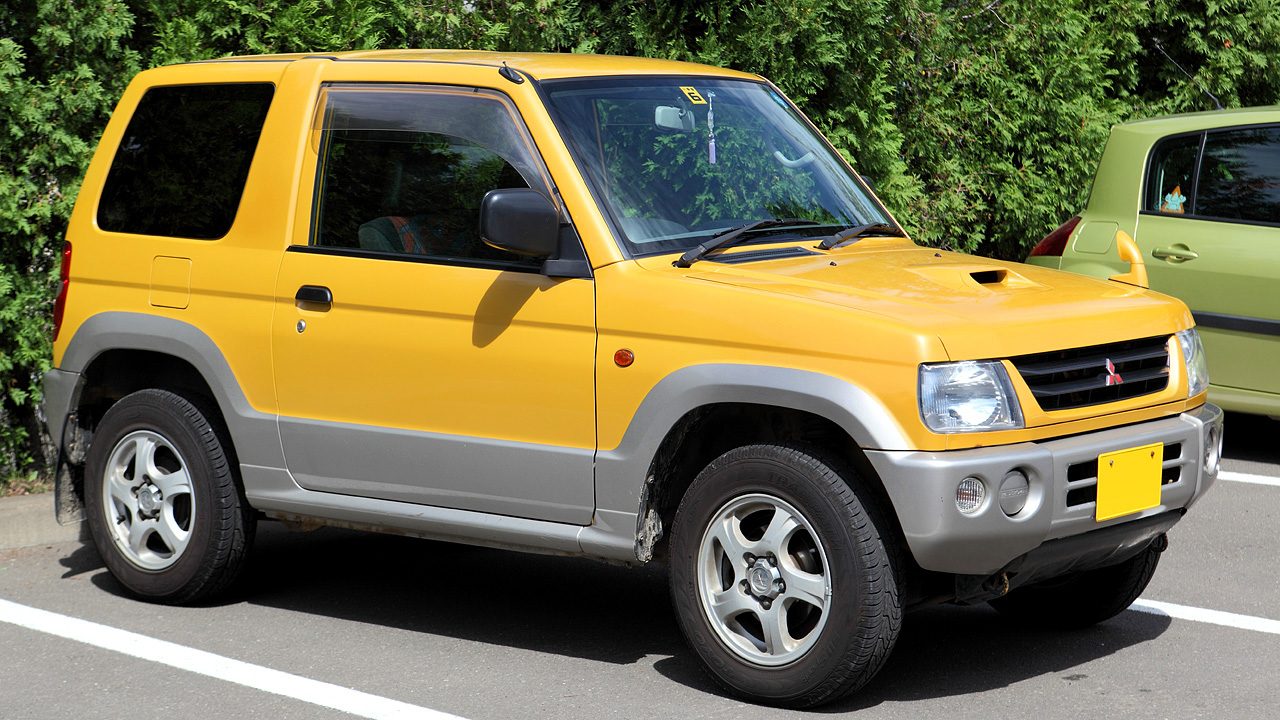
Pajero Mini X

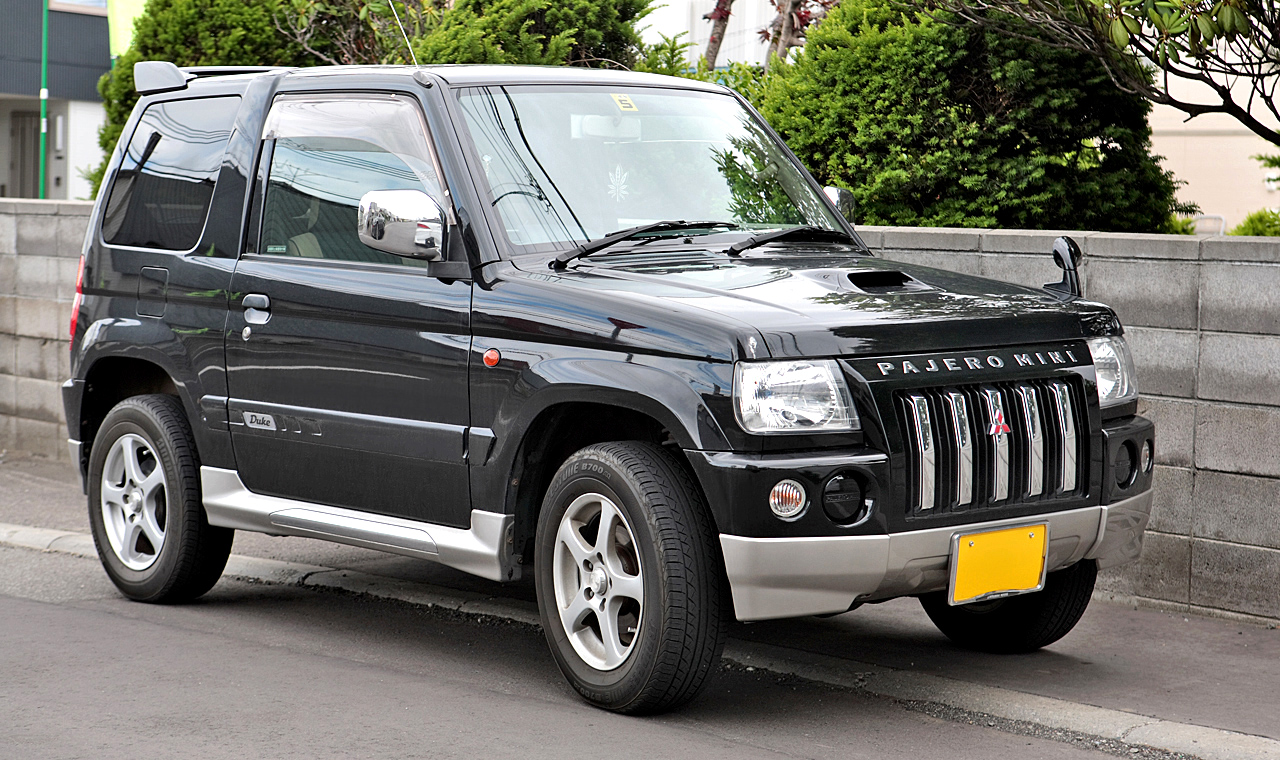
Pajero Mini Duke

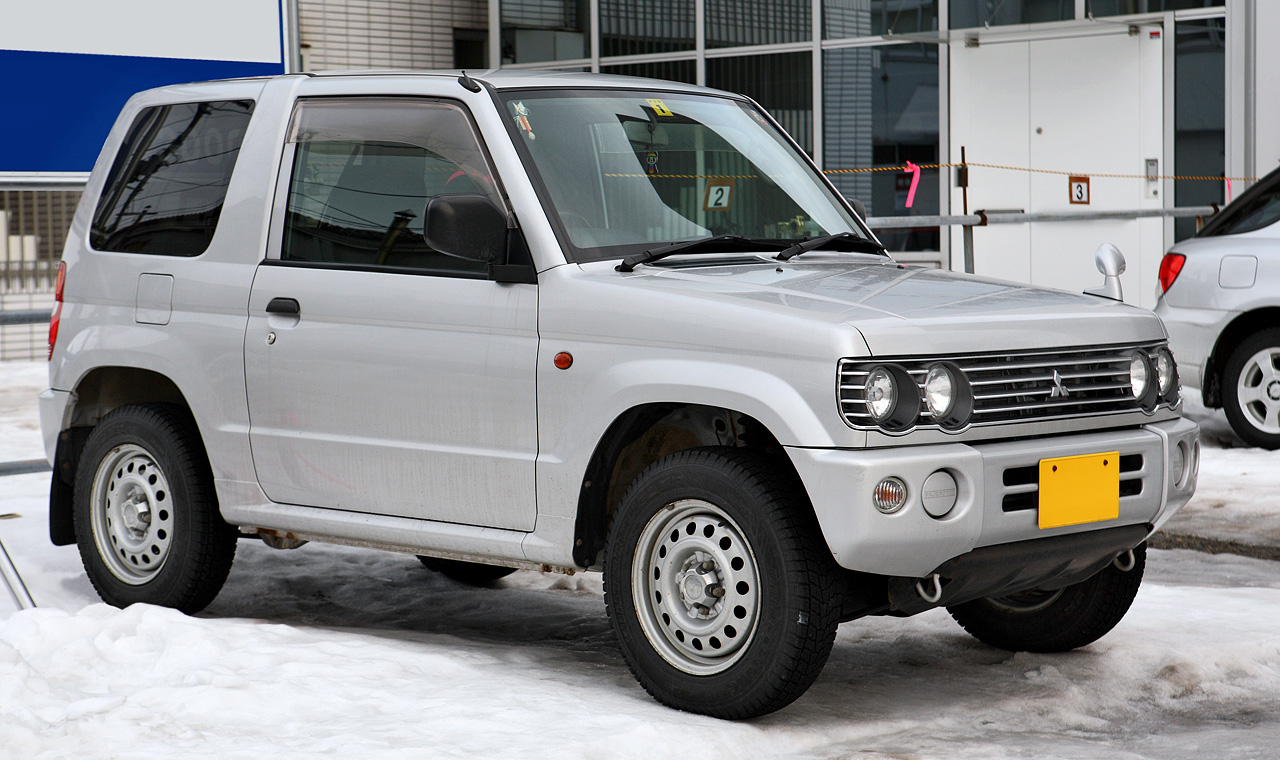
Pajero Mini Lynx

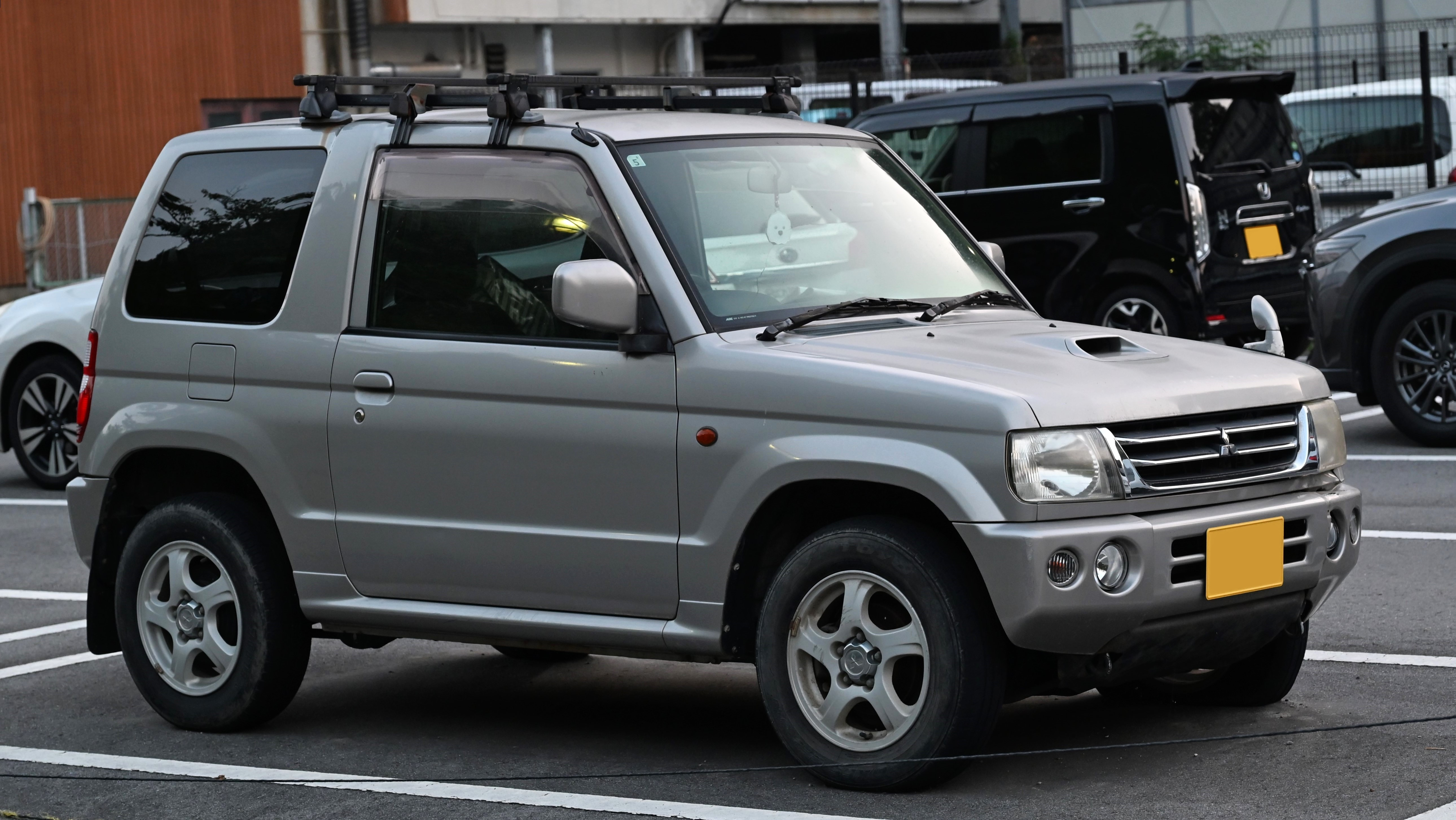
2003 First facelift

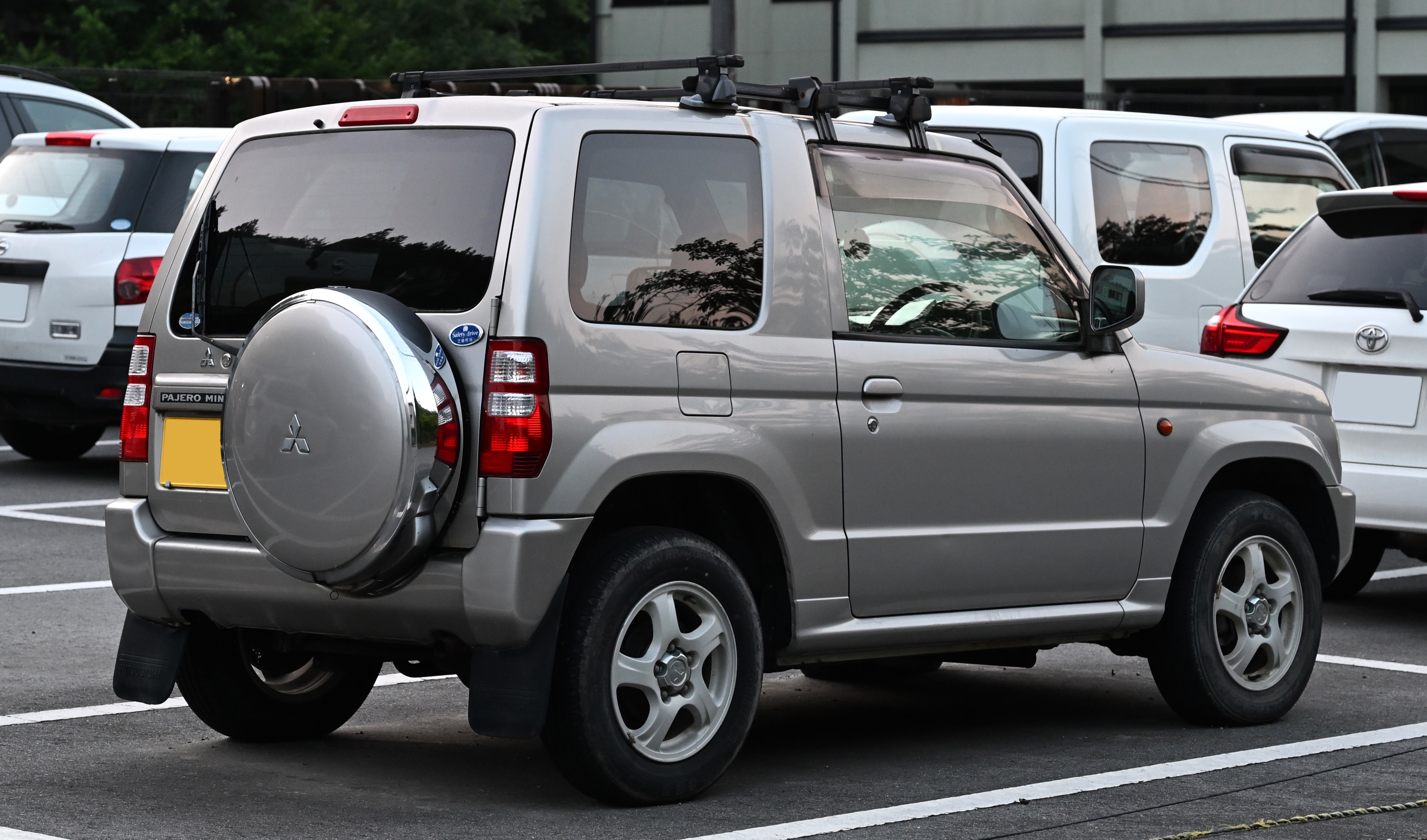
2003 First facelift rear

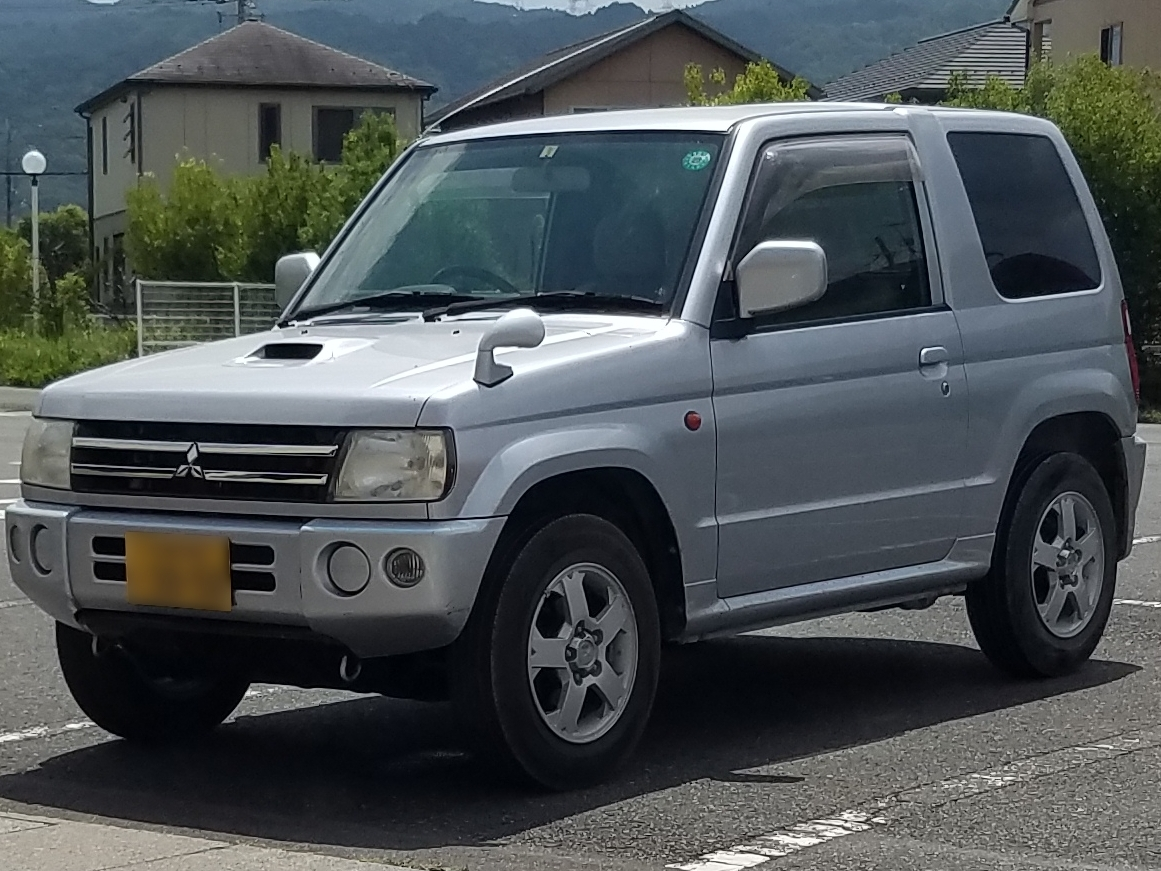
2005 Second facelit

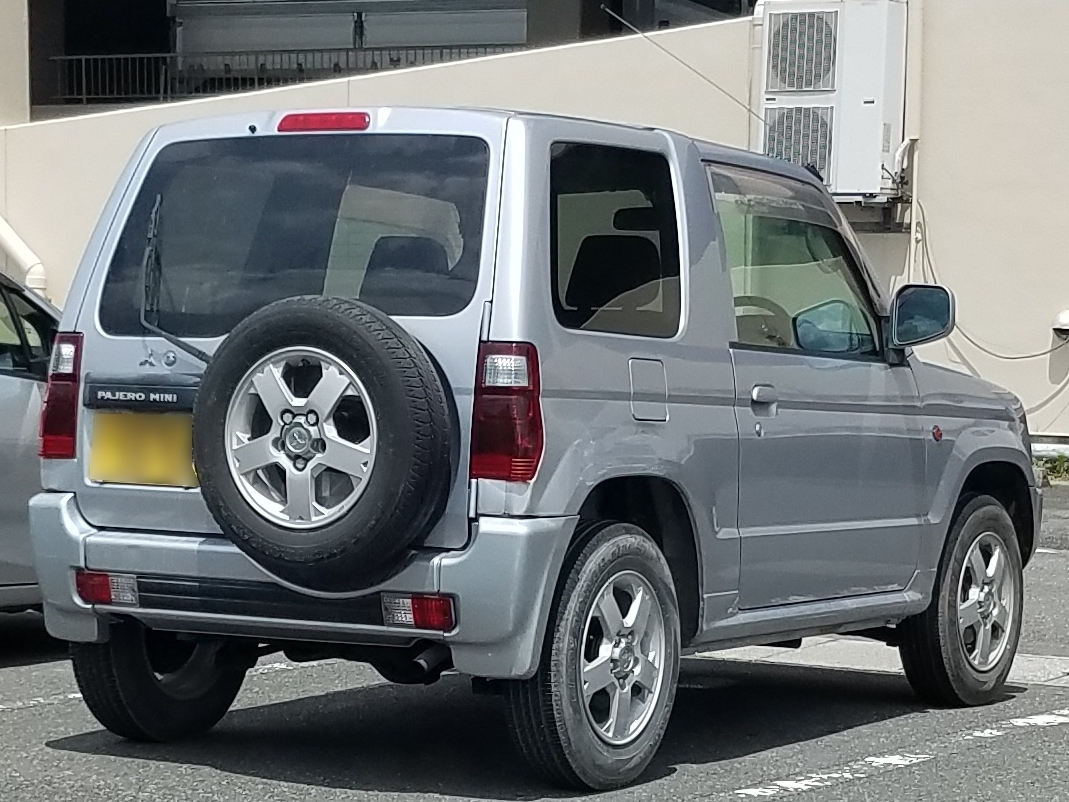
Second facelift rear

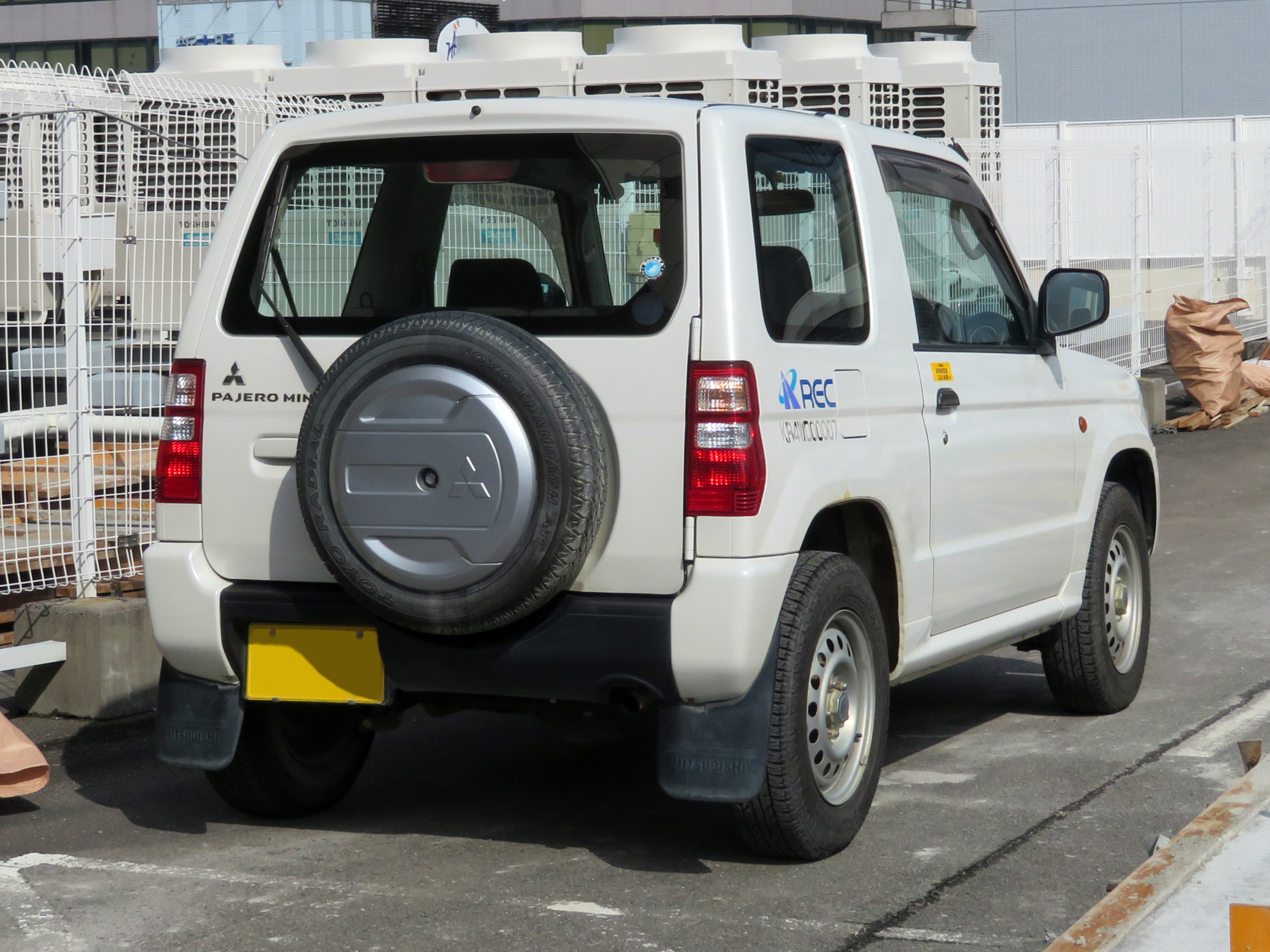
Third facelift rear

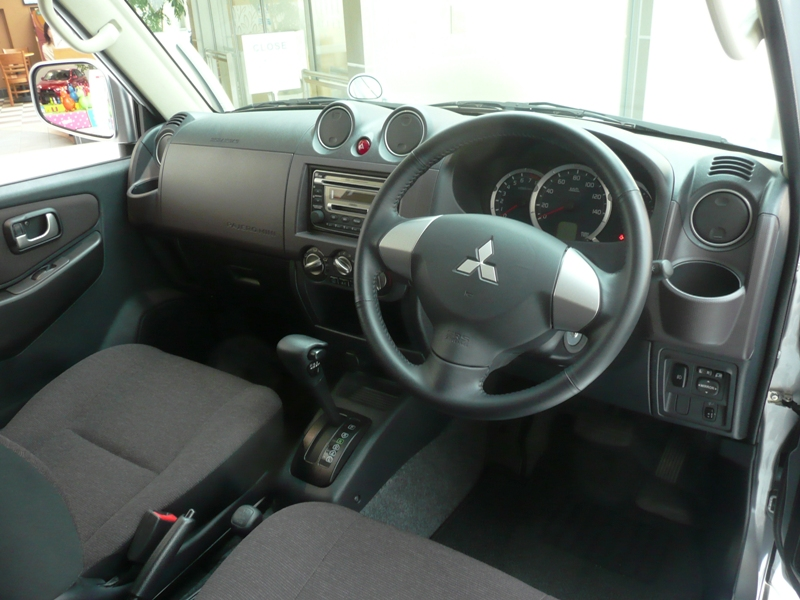
Interior (third facelift)

=== Nissan Kix ===
From 2008, Mitsubishi produced the Nissan Kix (Japanese: 日産・キックス, Hepburn: Nissan Kikkusu), an OEM version of the Pajero Mini, expanding a similar deal already in place for the Mitsubishi eK/Nissan Otti. Sales ended in August 2012, as the Pajero Mini was discontinued.

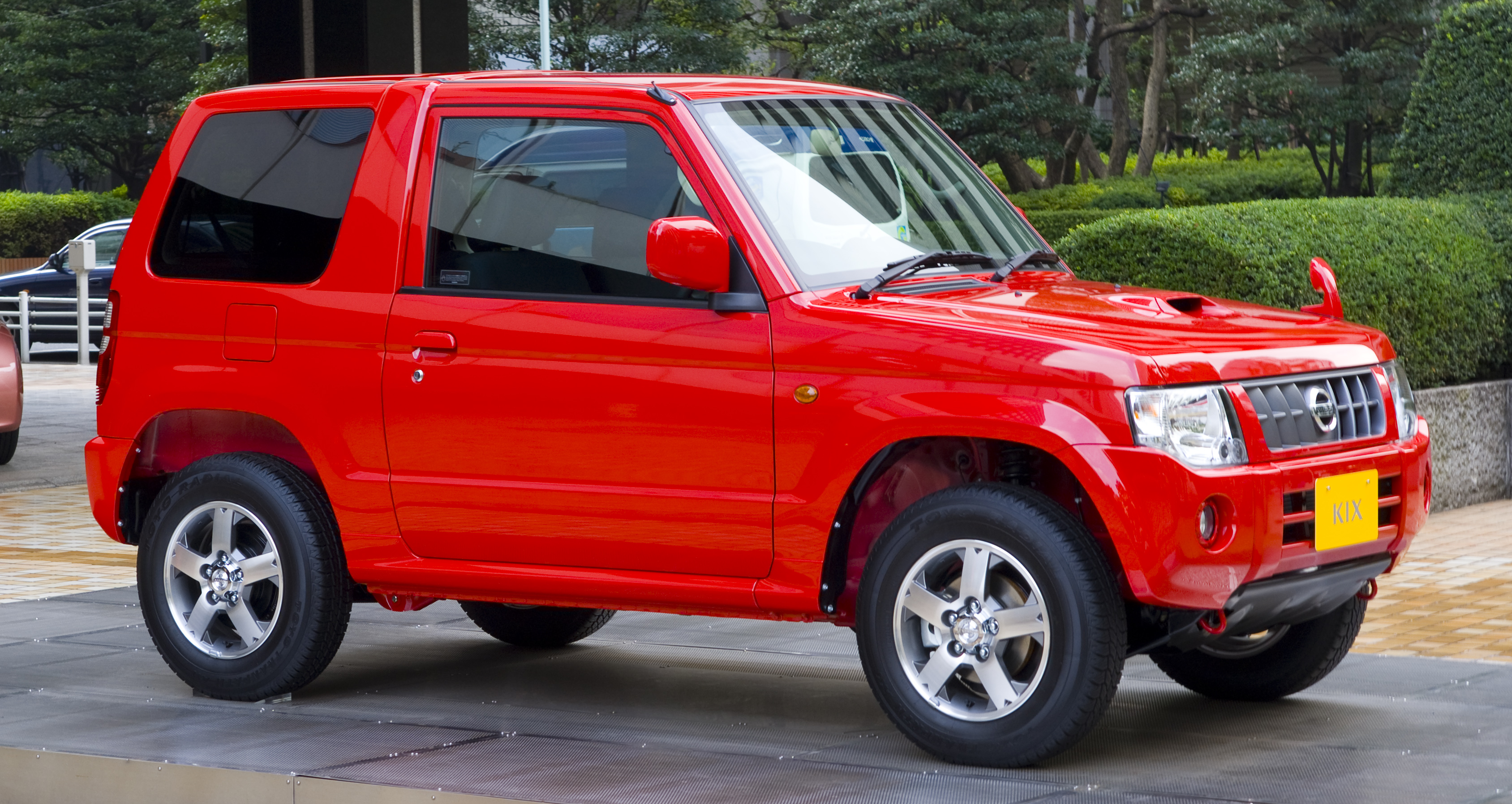
Nissan Kix

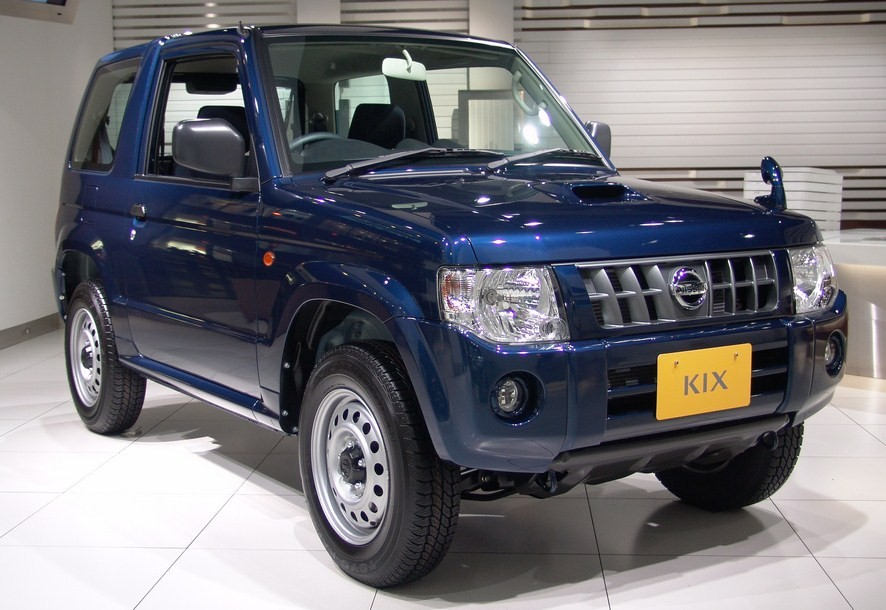
Nissan Kix RS

== Annual production and sales ==
Year	Production	Sales	Exports
1994	unknown	unknown	unknown
1995	104,990	unknown	unknown
1996	71,185	unknown	unknown
1997	43,302	44,224	358
1998	48,792	47,592	32
1999	36,580	35,673	3
2000	24,895	27,011	2
2001	16,590	17,458	0
2002	12,672	13,720	–
2003	17,141	17,237	–
2004	10,307	10,371	–
2005	10,445	10,611	–
2006	9,436	9,367	–
2007	9,279	9,195	–
2008	17,033	11,456	–
2009	11,195	8,646	–
2010	9,165	8,056	–
2011	9,681	8,281	–
2012	5,862	6,081	–
		32 more cars sold 2013-2017	

(Sources: Facts & Figures 2000, Facts & Figures 2001, Facts & Figures 2005, Facts & Figures 2009, Mitsubishi Motors website)
