= Mitsubishi Pajero iO =

Mini SUV (1998–2007)

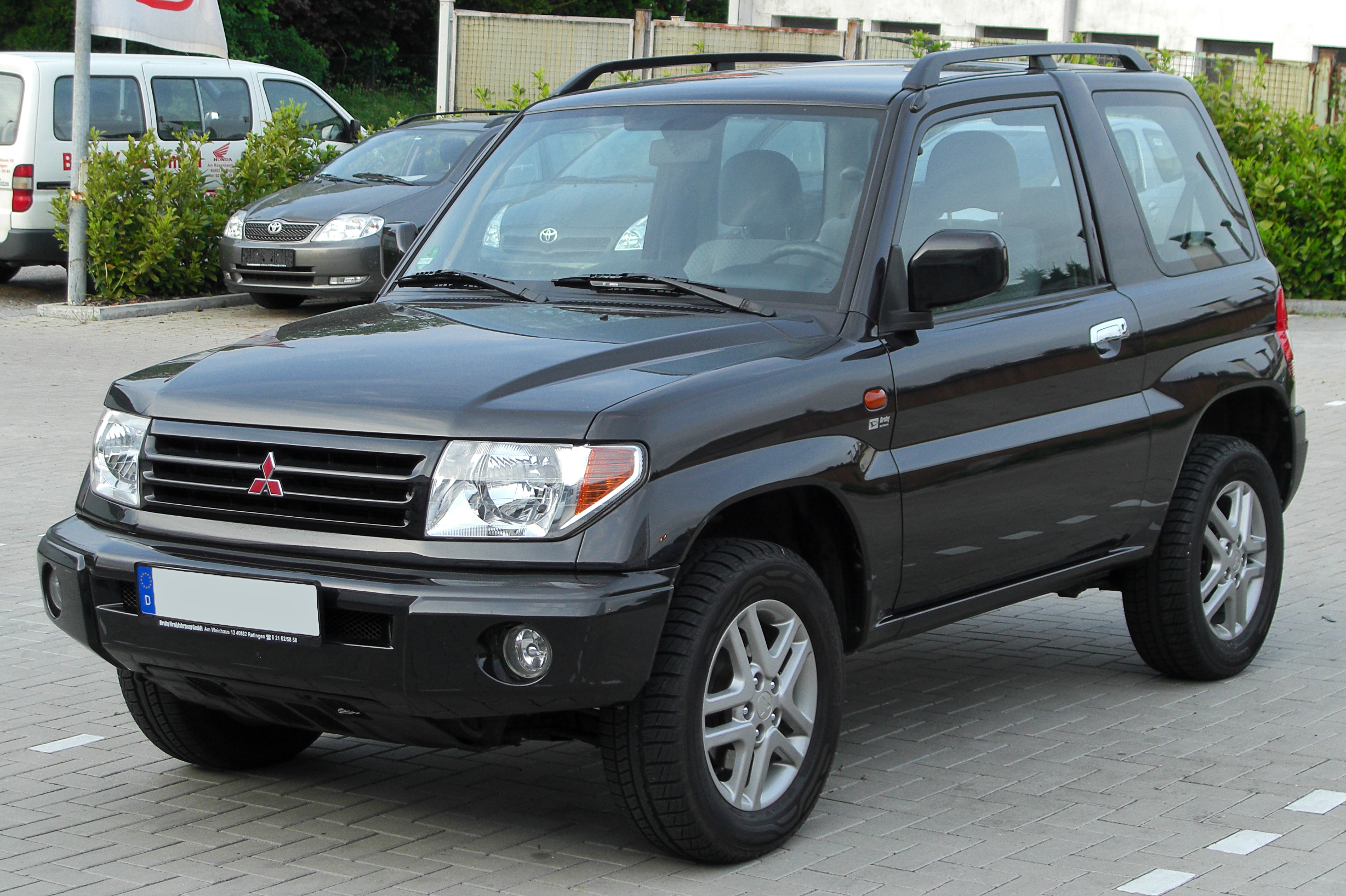
- Mitsubishi Pajero Pinin 3-door

Overview
- Manufacturer: Mitsubishi Motors
- Also called: Mitsubishi Montero iO; Mitsubishi Pajero Pinin; Mitsubishi Shogun Pinin (UK); Mitsubishi Pinin; Mitsubishi Pajero TR4 (Brazil); Changfeng Liebao Feiteng CFA 6400 (China)
- Production: 1998–2007; 2002–2015 (Brazil); 2003–2014 (China)
- Assembly: Japan: Okazaki, Aichi (Nagoya Plant); Italy: Turin (Pininfarina); Brazil: Catalão (HPE Automotores); China: Changsha (Changfeng Motor)
- Designer: Pininfarina

Body and chassis
- Class: Mini SUV
- Body style: 3/5-door SUV
- Layout: Front-engine, rear-wheel-drive; Front-engine, four-wheel-drive
- Chassis: Unibody

Powertrain
- Engine: Petrol: 1.6 L 4G18 I4; 1.8 L 4G93 I4; 1.8 L 4G93 turbo I4; 2.0 L 4G94 I4
- Transmission: 5-speed manual 4-speed automatic

Dimensions
- Wheelbase: 2,280 mm (89.8 in) (3-door); 2,450 mm (96.5 in) (5-door)
- Length: 3,675 mm (144.7 in) (3-door); 3,975 mm (156.5 in) (5-door)
- Width: 1,680 mm (66.1 in)
- Height: 1,700–1,750 mm (66.9–68.9 in)
- Curb weight: 1,250–1,400 kg (2,760–3,090 lb)

Chronology
- Predecessor: Mitsubishi Pajero Junior
- Successor: Mitsubishi RVR/ASX/Outlander Sport

The Mitsubishi Pajero iO is a mini SUV produced by the Japanese manufacturer Mitsubishi between 1999 (since June 15, 1998, in three-door form, and August 24, 1998, as a five-door) and 2007. The "iO" name is derived from the Italian for "I" which, according to Mitsubishi, "generates an image of being easy to get to know, easy to drive, and of being one's very own Pajero".

== Overview ==
It was exported as the Montero iO, and to Europe as the Pajero Pinin, Shogun Pinin or simply Pinin to honour Pininfarina, which built the local market versions of the car at their factory near Turin, Italy. It was also produced in Brazil as the Pajero TR4 from 2002 to 2015 under license. The name was changed after imported versions were referred to as "1.0" instead of "iO", which could lead to confusion about the engine sizes. The Brazilian TR4 was Mitsubishi's first four-wheel drive flexible-fuel vehicle - running on gasoline, ethanol or a combination of the two - when it was introduced in July 2007. The car is also produced in China by Changfeng Automobile under the Liebao (Leopaard) brand as the Changfeng Liebao Feiteng CFA 6400 available with the 4G94 engine paired to a 5-speed manual transmission.

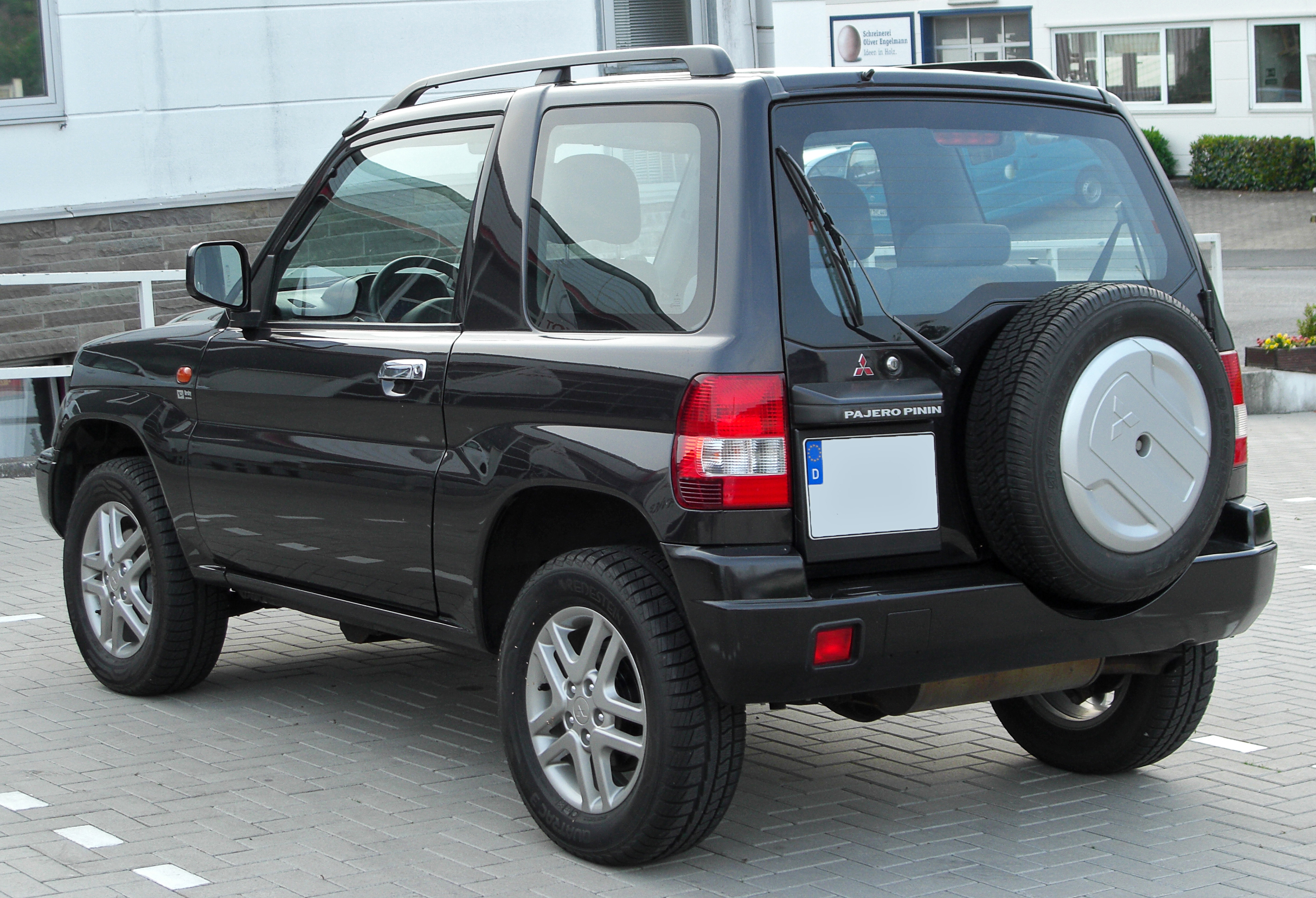
Mitsubishi Pajero Pinin 3-door

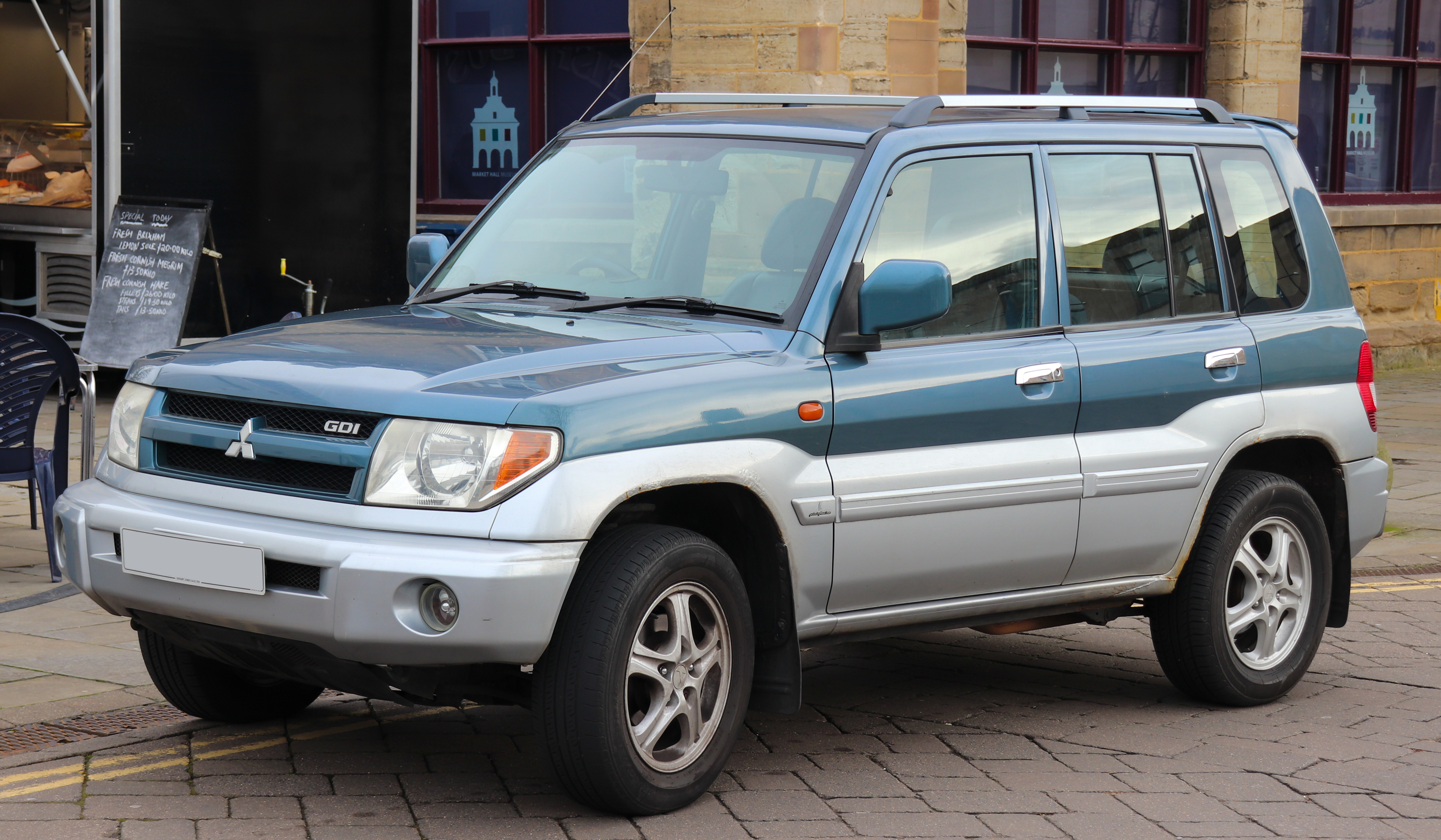
2005 Mitsubishi Shogun Pinin GDi Elegance

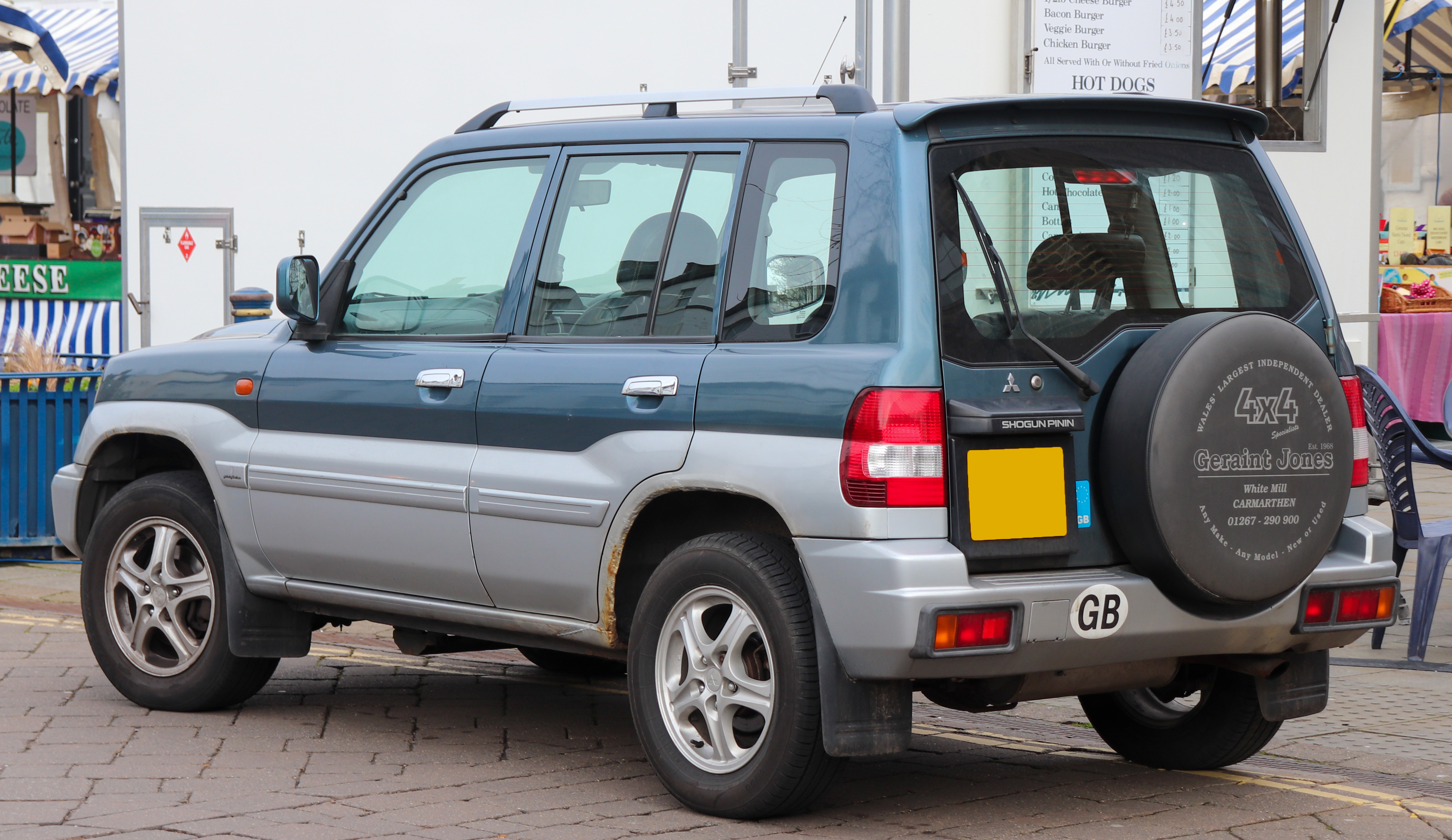
2005 Mitsubishi Shogun Pinin GDi Elegance

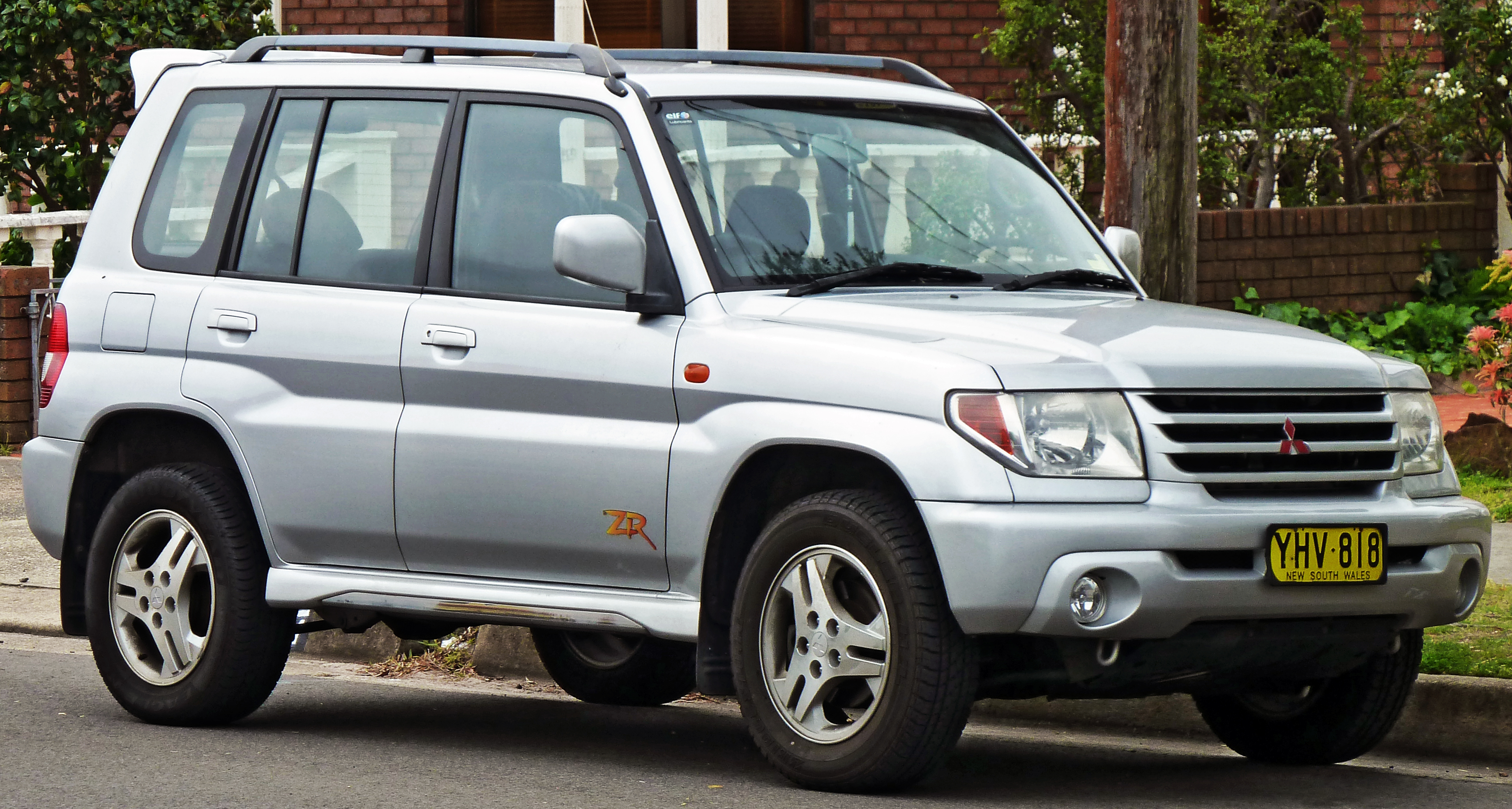
2001–2002 Mitsubishi Pajero iO ZR 5-door wagon (Australia)

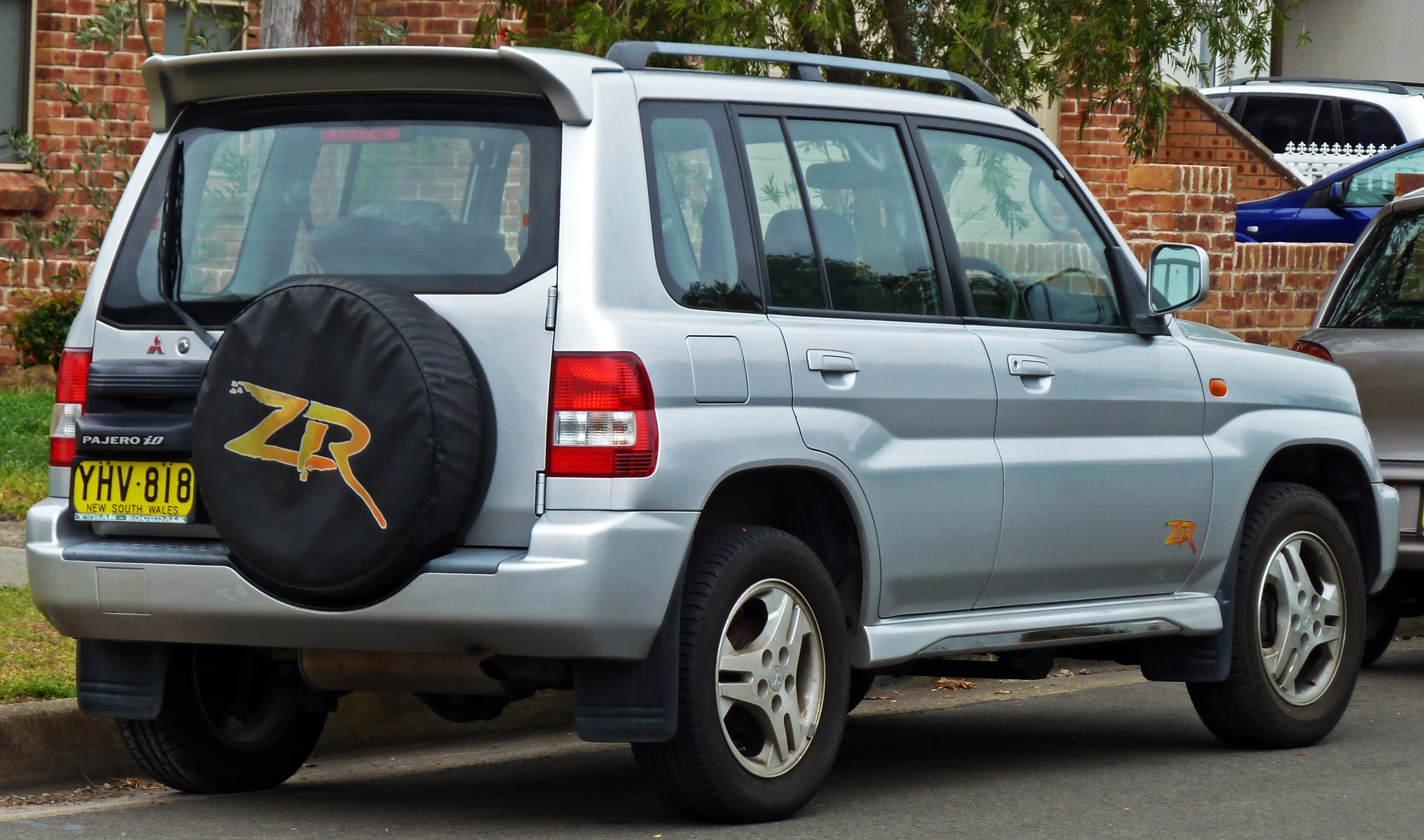
2001–2002 Mitsubishi Pajero iO ZR 5-door wagon (Australia)

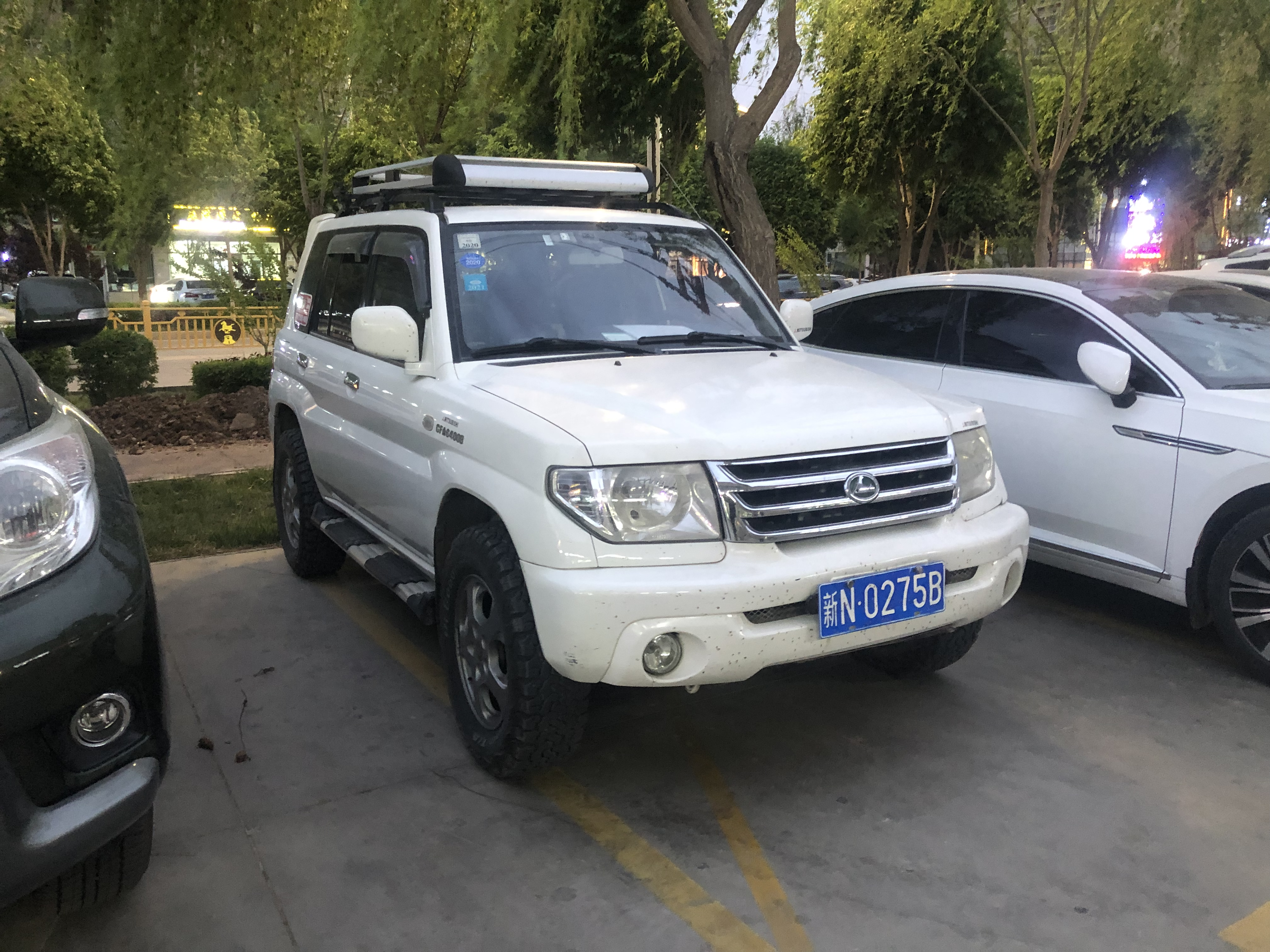
Changfeng Liebao Feiteng CFA 6400

== Annual production ==
Year	Production		
Year	Japan	Italy	Brazil
1998	54,262	-	-
1999	51,516	9,587	-
2000	24,783	18,626	-
2001	13,799	12,150	-
2002	8,959	11,300	1,380
2003	9,016	8,313	3,180
2004	8,136	8,579	6,090
2005	3,592	1,591	5,280
2006	2,564	-	6,060
2007	505	-	9,300
2008	-	-	9,108
2009	-	-	8,337
2010	-	-	11,409
2011	-	-	8,991
2012	-	-	8,900
2013	-	-	9,061
2014	-	-	7,400

(sources: Facts & Figures 2000, Facts & Figures 2005, Facts & Figures 2008, Mitsubishi Motors website)
