= Mitsubishi Pajero Junior =

Mini SUV

Mitsubishi Pajero Junior (H57A)
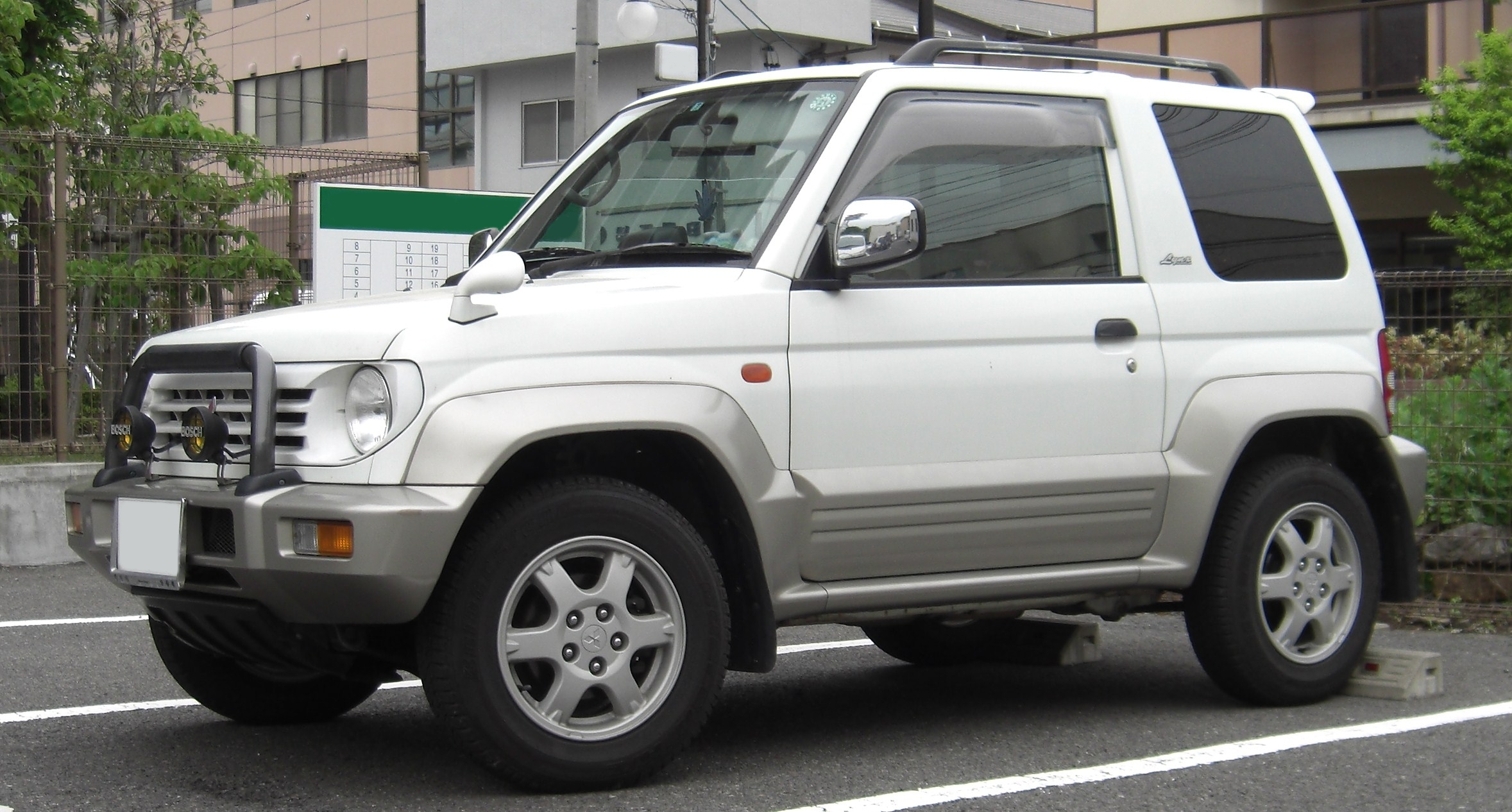

Overview
- Manufacturer: Mitsubishi Motors
- Production: October 1995 – March 1998
- Assembly: Japan: Okazaki, Aichi (Nagoya plant)

Body and chassis
- Class: Mini SUV
- Body style: 3-door SUV
- Layout: Front-engine, four-wheel-drive
- Chassis: Unibody
- Related: Mitsubishi Pajero Mini

Powertrain
- Engine: Petrol: 1094 cc 4A31 SOHC 16-valve I4
- Power output: 80 PS (59 kW)
- Transmission: 5-speed manual 3-speed automatic

Dimensions
- Wheelbase: 2,200 mm (86.6 in)
- Length: 3,500 mm (137.8 in)
- Width: 1,545 mm (60.8 in)
- Height: 1,660 mm (65.4 in)
- Curb weight: 980 kg (2,160 lb)

Chronology
- Successor: Mitsubishi Pajero iO

The Mitsubishi Pajero Junior is a mini SUV produced by Japanese automaker Mitsubishi Motors between October 1995 and March 1998 for the Japanese domestic market only. Based on a lengthened Minica platform, it was a larger version of the Mitsubishi Pajero Mini, a kei car. The biggest visual difference from the Pajero Mini is the wide fender trims and wider tyres, giving it a more purposeful appearance. The car is classified as a small size car according to Japanese government dimension regulations, so it pays lower taxes than the normal-size Pajero but higher taxes than the Pajero Mini.

== Design ==
For road and light off-road use, a rear wheel drive configuration can be selected. However, it also has a selectable (which Mitsubishi called "Easy-Select 4WD") four-wheel drive system (low and high gear ratios) for serious off-road driving. The Pajero Junior has better off-road capabilities than some contemporary mini SUVs like the Daihatsu Terios and Suzuki X-90.

The 1094 cc engine block is the same as used in the Mitsubishi Colt, developing 80 PS (59 kW) at 6,500 rpm and giving the vehicle a top speed of 135 km/h (84 mph). The steering is a traditional rack and pinion setup, with power assistance. The front suspension is double wishbone, and the rear is helical spring.

Sales of the Mitsubishi Pajero Junior ended in June 1998 due to the launch of its replacement, the Mitsubishi Pajero iO (known in Europe as the "Pinin"). By that time, Mitsubishi were aware that many Pajero Juniors were being unofficially exported to other countries, so an entirely new model was designed to take the vehicle away from its kei car roots and to support larger engine sizes for the international market, although only form factors and engines that fit within Japanese compact class were available for the newer car.

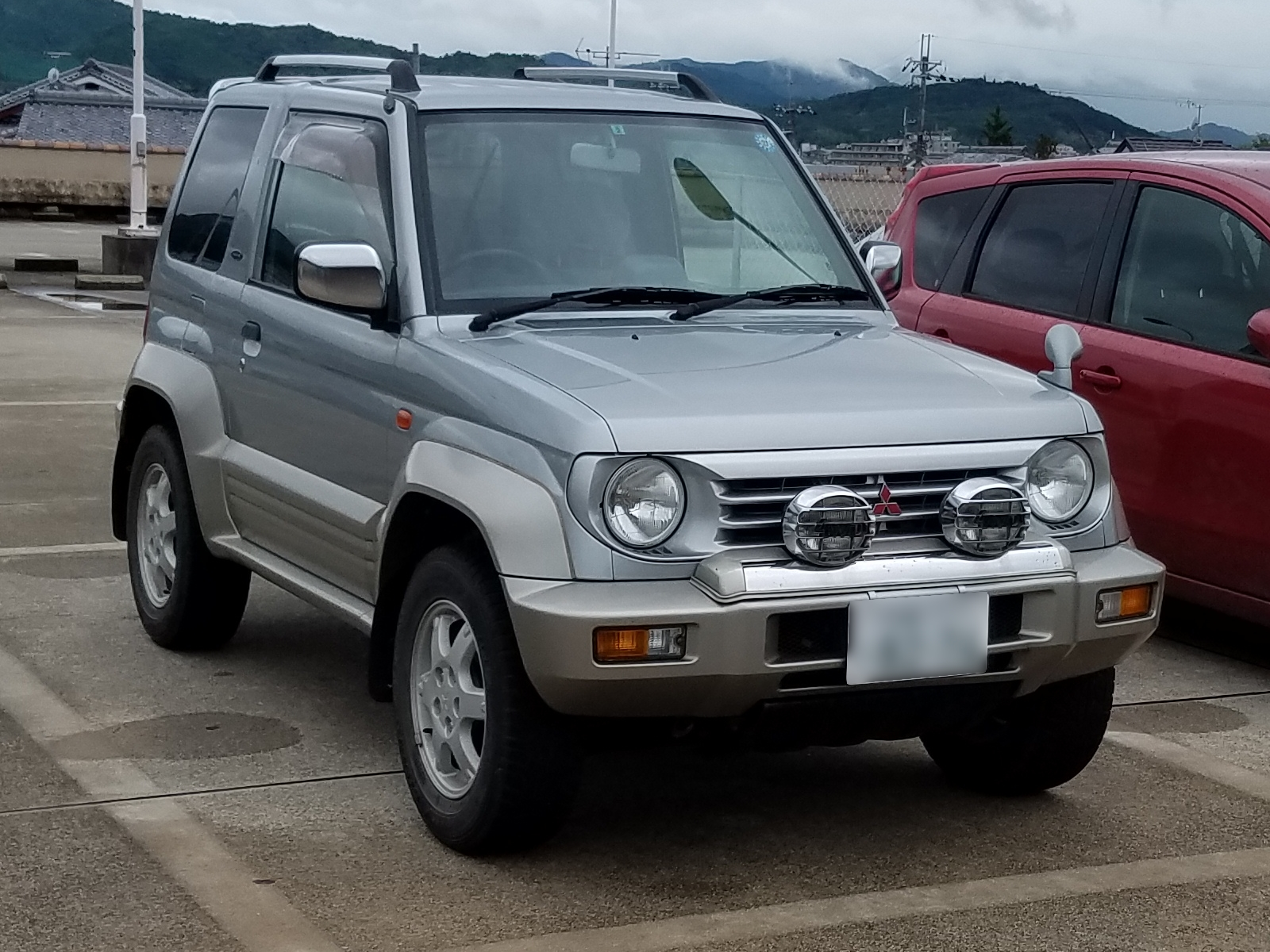
Front view

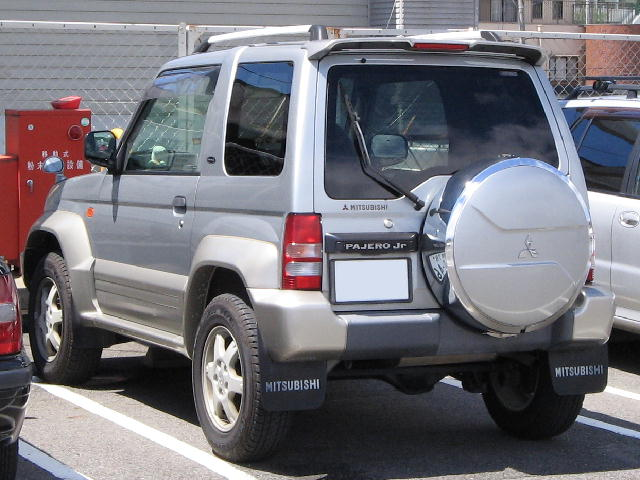
Rear view

== Versions ==
=== Pajero Jr. ZR-I ===
The first vehicles rolled off the production line on 26 October 1995. The ZR-I was the only model available until it was superseded by the ZR-II in January 1997.

It was equipped with a range of amenities as standard such as air-conditioning, anti-lock brakes (ABS), SRS airbag (driver's side), electric front windows, electric door mirrors and keyless entry. A small selection of optional extras were available such as six-spoked aluminium wheels, bull bars, roof rails and privacy glass. The functional interior design included cup holders, quarter pockets, and split rear seats which fold completely flat providing a surprisingly large carrying capacity for such a small vehicle.

=== Pajero Jr. ZR-II ===
The ZR-II was built from January 1997 to March 1998 (with sales ending in June of that year) and had the same specification as the ZR-I model, plus an additional cluster of digital instruments which included an altimeter, compass, outside temperature gauge and a clock.

=== Pajero Jr. McTwist & Pajero Jr. Lynx ===
The popularity of the vehicle inspired Mitsubishi to create three limited editions (with the intention to build up to 1000 units of each limited edition), two of which — the Pajero Jr. McTwist, and Pajero Jr. Lynx — were exhibited at the 32nd Tokyo Motor Show in 1997.

Both of these limited edition models shared the same base specification as the ZR-II, with the addition of a wood-effect insert on the dashboard and upgraded interior trim (grey on the McTwist, beige on the Lynx). External differences were that the McTwist model (built from October 1996 to March 1998) sported a plastic A-frame bullbar with 6 in (15 cm) spotlights, and the Lynx model (built from May 1997 to July 1997) sported a stainless steel bar upon which two small 5 in (13 cm) spotlights were mounted. The yellow lensed spotlights on both of these models were sourced from Robert Bosch GmbH and were supplied with black removable grilles displaying "BOSCH" in white text.

Both models also had a rear roof-level spoiler with integrated LED third brakelight, roof rails, privacy glass, and six-spoke alloy wheels fitted as standard.

=== Pajero Jr. Flying Pug ===
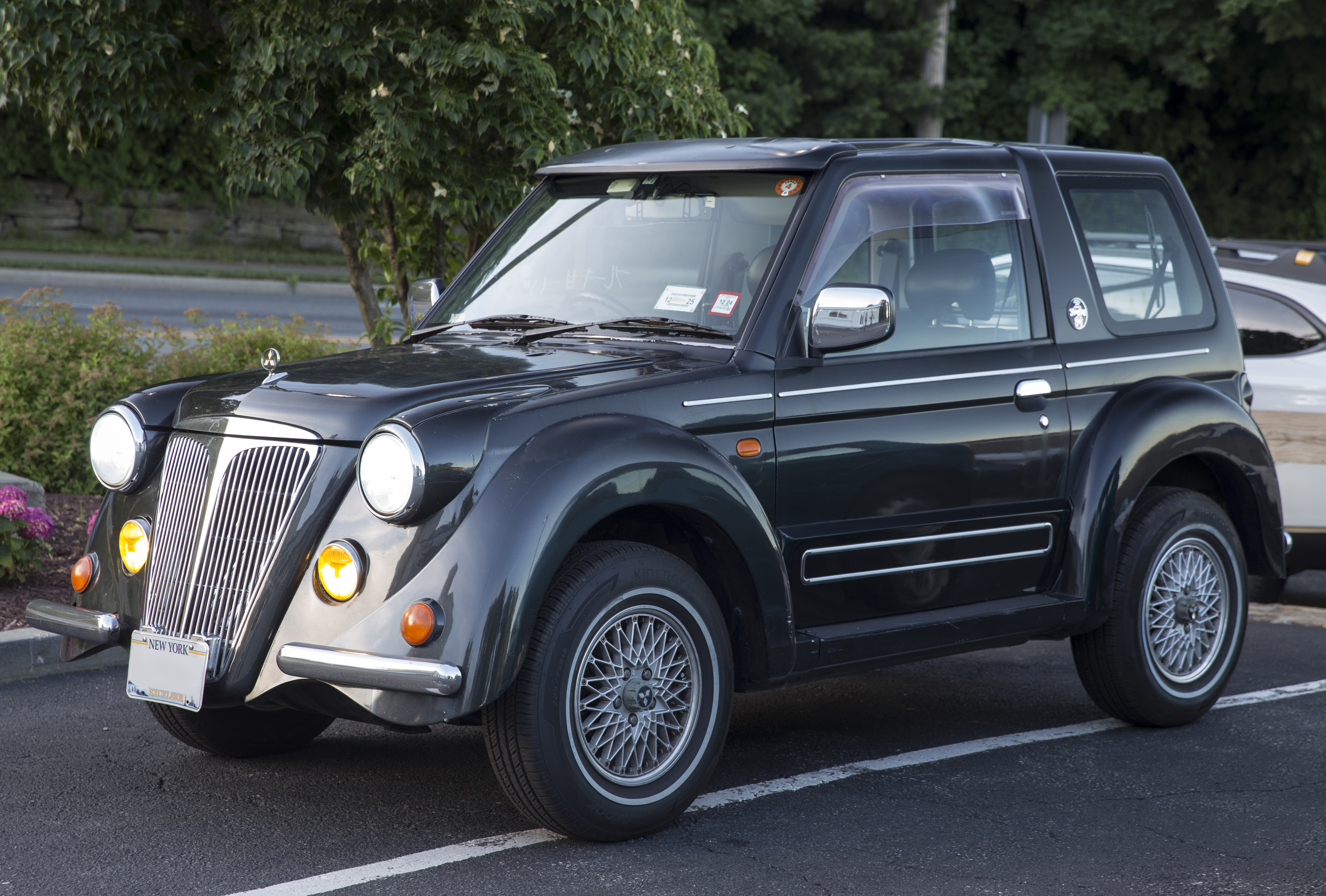
Mitsubishi Pajero Jr. Flying Pug

The third limited edition which was launched in 1997, was the Pajero Jr. Flying Pug. Mitsubishi was responding to the rise in the popularity of old British cars at the time in Japan, so they decided that the Pajero Jr. would be a good platform to experiment with a "retro-look" bodywork restyle. It is understood that this rise in retro-styled cars in Japan was started by the success of the Mitsuoka Viewt, which was a collaboration with Nissan and based on the Nissan Micra.

Similarly to the other two limited edition models which were announced in 1997, Mitsubishi had originally planned to build 1000 examples. However, the bodywork was heavily criticised by the motoring press as being ugly and this variant was such a sales flop that only 139 were ever made (built from September 1997 to June 1998). Mitsubishi's rather ambitious sales literature for the Flying Pug indicated that the vehicle "sported the classic looks of a London taxi".

This limited edition had the highest specification of the entire Junior range, sporting a full leather interior as standard in addition to unique cross-spoked aluminium wheels. The Flying Pug also shared the wood-effect dashboard insert as used on the Lynx and McTwist models, and had an additional wood-effect surround for the gear lever.

== Recalls ==
In February 2001, all Pajero Juniors were recalled to replace the airbag unit in the centre of the steering wheel. This was due to reports of a small number of airbags being deployed upon starting the engine.

== Annual production and sales ==
Year	Production
1995	30,605
1996	24,690
1997	13,934
1998	149
