= Mitsubishi eK =

Kei car series produced by Mitsubishi Motors and Nissan

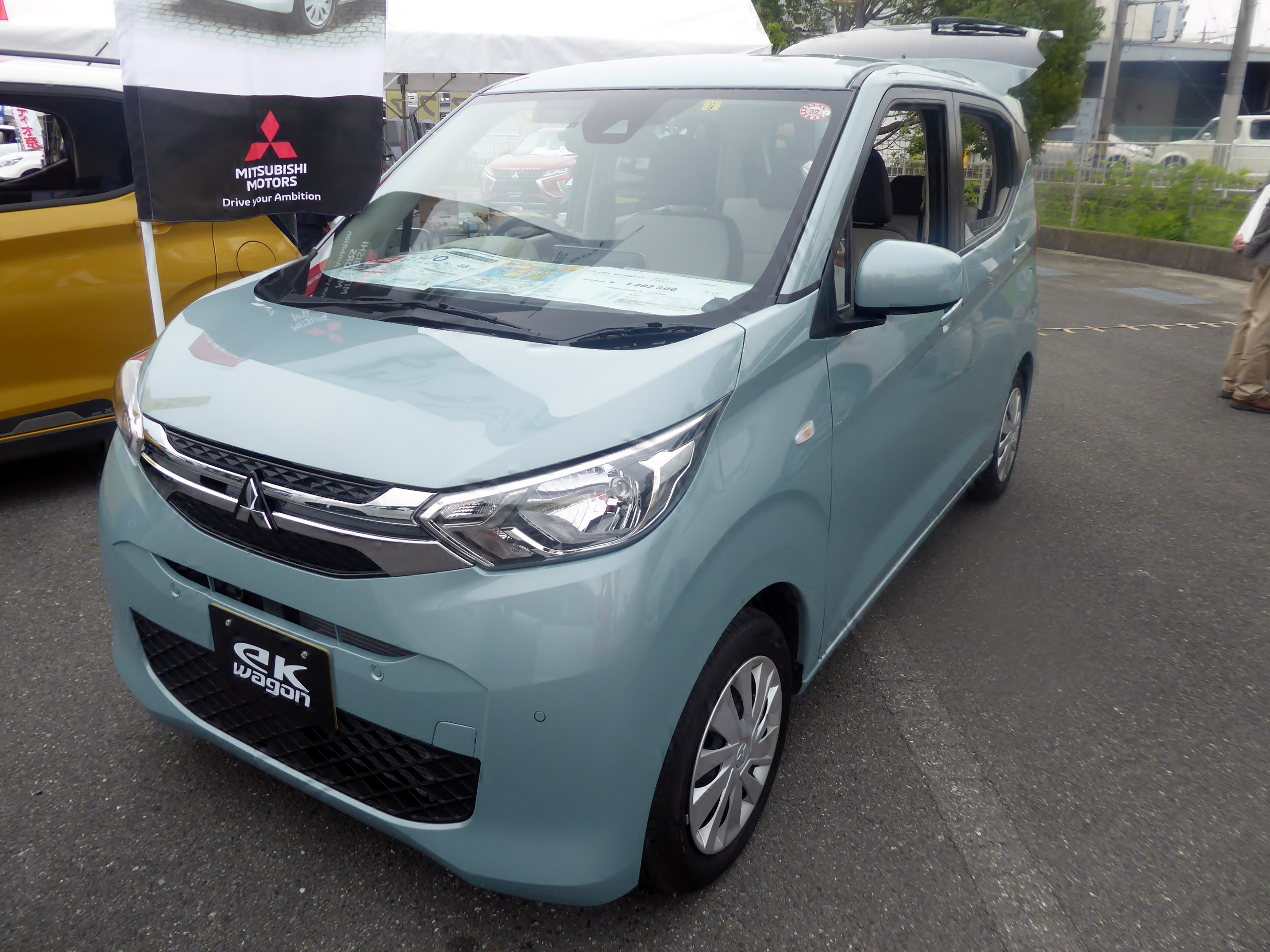
- Mitsubishi eK Wagon

Overview
- Manufacturer: Mitsubishi Motors (2001–2013); NMKV (2013–present)
- Also called: Nissan Otti (2005–2013); Nissan Dayz (2013–present)
- Production: October 2001 – present
- Assembly: Japan: Kurashiki, Okayama (Mizushima plant)

Body and chassis
- Class: Kei car
- Body style: 5-door hatchback
- Layout: Front-engine, front-wheel-drive; Front-engine, four-wheel-drive
- Related: Mitsubishi eK Space; Nissan Sakura

Chronology
- Predecessor: Mitsubishi Minica; Mitsubishi i

The Mitsubishi eK (Japanese: 三菱・イーケイ, Hepburn: Mitsubishi Ē Kei) is a kei car series from Mitsubishi Motors and Nissan, based on the long-running Minica, and first introduced on 11 October 2001. The "eK" name is an abbreviation for "excellent keijidōsha" (or "excellent minicar") and is meant to be pronounced "ee kay", a pun which sounds like the Japanese いい軽, meaning "good kei [car]".

Since 8 June 2005, Nissan received 36,000 eK Wagons annually from Mitsubishi, to be sold within the domestic market as the Nissan Otti. The Otti was replaced by the Nissan Dayz on 6 June 2013, although the Otti was still sold alongside the Dayz until being discontinued on 28 June 2013. A tall-height minivan version with rear sliding doors called the eK Space appeared in 2014. It, too has a Nissan version, called the Nissan Dayz Roox from 2014 to 2020 and as the Nissan Roox from 2020.

Mitsubishi eK logo (2013–2020)

== First generation (2001) ==
First generation
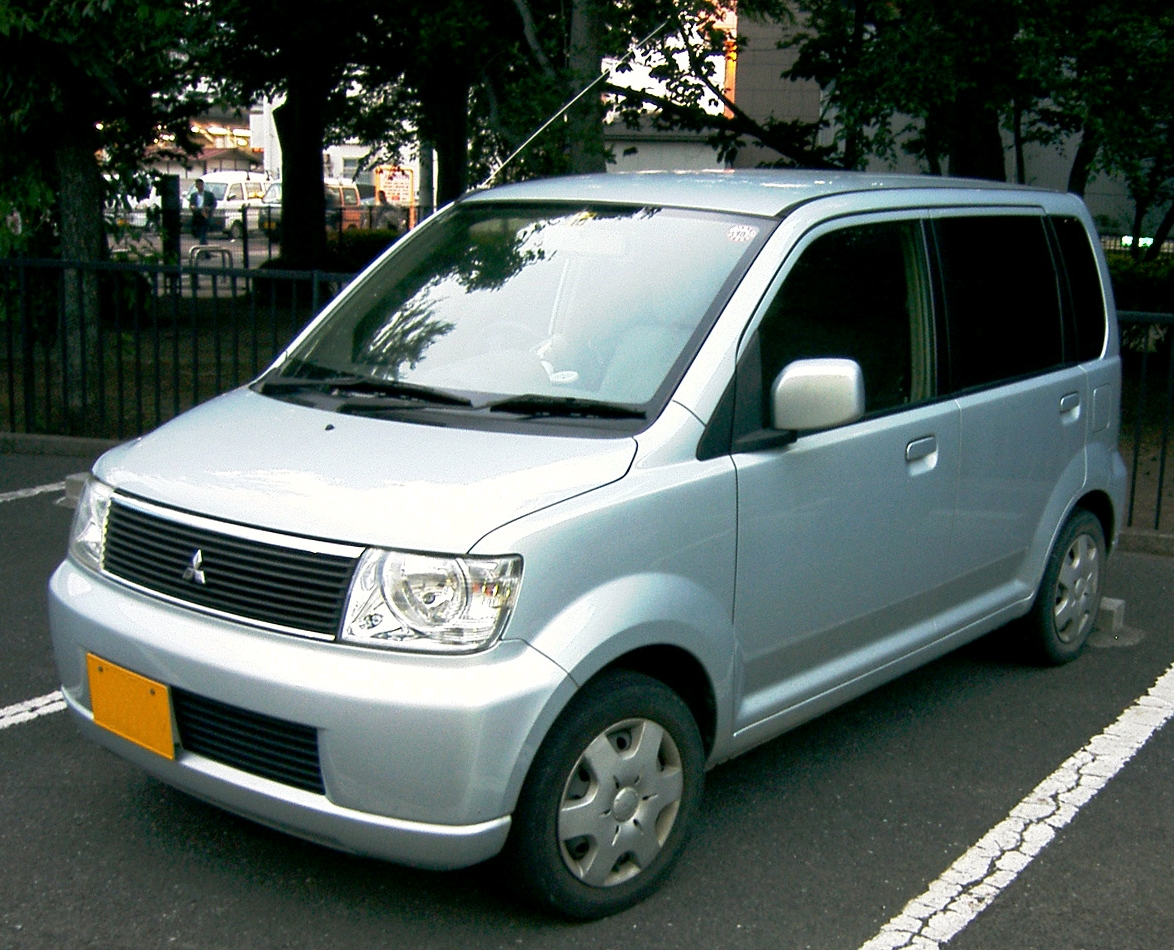
- Mitsubishi eK Wagon (pre-facelift)

Overview
- Model code: H81; H91; NA0 (Otti)
- Also called: Nissan Otti (2005–2006)
- Production: October 2001 – September 2006

Powertrain
- Engine: 658 cc 3G83 I3; 658 cc 3G83T turbo I3
- Transmission: 5-speed manual; 3/4-speed automatic

Dimensions
- Wheelbase: 2,340 mm (92.1 in)
- Length: 3,395 mm (133.7 in)
- Width: 1,475 mm (58.1 in)
- Height: 1,550–1,600 mm (61.0–63.0 in)
- Curb weight: 790–910 kg (1,742–2,006 lb)

In its first generation, it was available either as an eK Wagon (introduced on 11 October 2001), eK Sport (introduced on 2 September 2002), eK Classy (introduced on 26 May 2003) or eK Active (introduced on 25 May 2004).

The eK Wagon was released in a simplified lineup, in only a single model (M) with an available package (M+X) including alloy wheels and some other cosmetics. It was only available with the 3G83, naturally aspirated three-cylinder engine with 50 PS (37 kW); other models later added the option of a turbocharged version with 64 PS (47 kW). The standard transmission was a three-speed automatic with a column shift, later a four-speed version was added, while some models could also be fitted with a five-speed manual with a floor-mounted shifter. Most models could be had with either front- or four-wheel drive.

Immediately upon its release it was the recipient of the Good Design Award by the Japanese Ministry of Economy, Trade and Industry in 2001. While the initial sales target was 10,000 units per month, it sold 13,000 in its first four days, and 20,000 by the end of October 2001. It was Mitsubishi's highest volume model in the Japanese domestic market, and total sales to 2005 are approximately 480,000. In Japan, it was sold at a specific retail chain called Car Plaza.

The crossover eK Active model was introduced in 25 May 2004, shortly before the model was facelifted. Fitted with 14-inch wheels, ground clearance was increased by 10 mm (0.4 in) while the front seats sat 45 mm (1.8 in) higher. The addition of body cladding in dark grey imparted an off-road look to the model; the front clip was also different, featuring the new corporate face conceived by Olivier Boulay. The eK Active was available with either engine (the V model being naturally aspirated, VT the turbocharged model) but only with the four-speed automatic; both models also had optional four-wheel drive.

The eK Wagon G model, with more equipment and the four-speed automatic, was added in May 2003, originally only as the "M20G Thanks Edition", celebrating 200,000 sales. In August 2003 the G became a standard model, while the X-package was discontinued. A facelifted eK Wagon was introduced on 20 December 2004; the eK Active was not changed apart from receiving redesigned hubcaps. On 20 December 2005, the eK Classy was discontinued

=== Nissan Otti ===
After Nissan reached an agreement with Mitsubishi to expand its OEM mini car line-up on 16 January 2005, Nissan released the Otti on 17 June of the same year. The car is exclusive to Nissan Red Stage and Nissan Blue Stage dealers.

Aside from the design of the front grille, body colors, there are no major differences from the OEM versions, the eK Wagon and eK Sport.

Mitsubishi eK

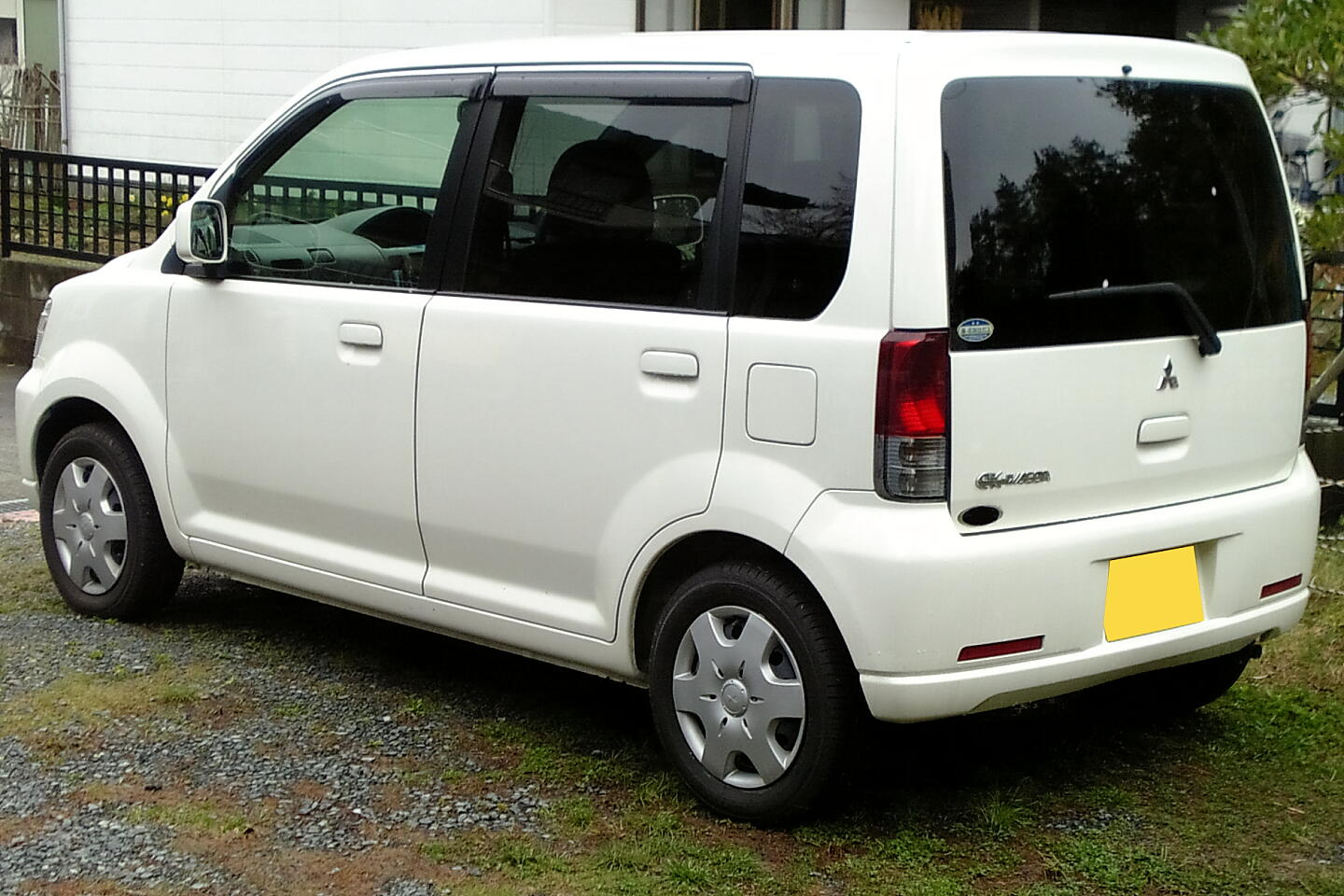
Mitsubishi eK Wagon (pre-facelift)

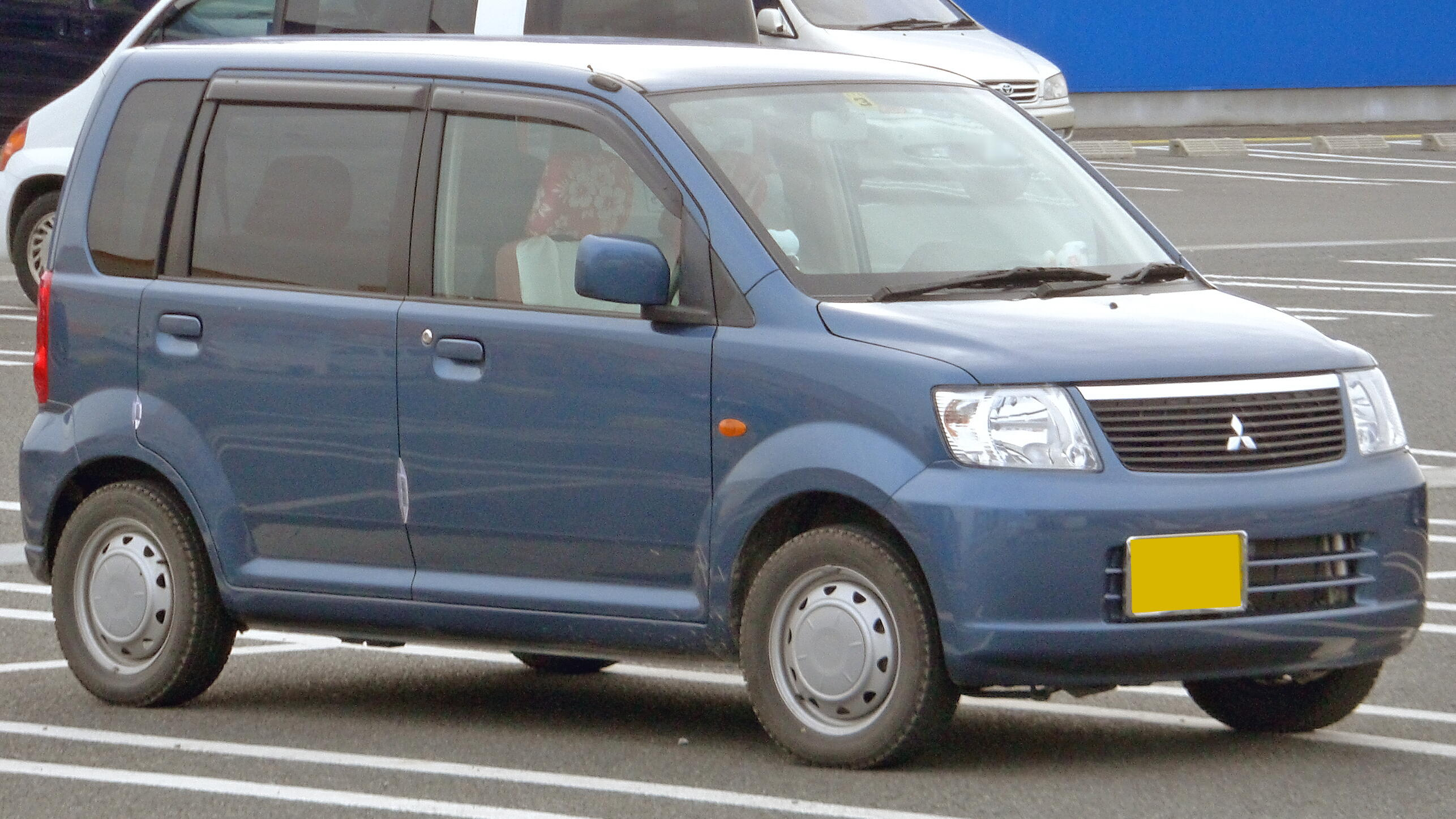
Mitsubishi eK Wagon (facelift)

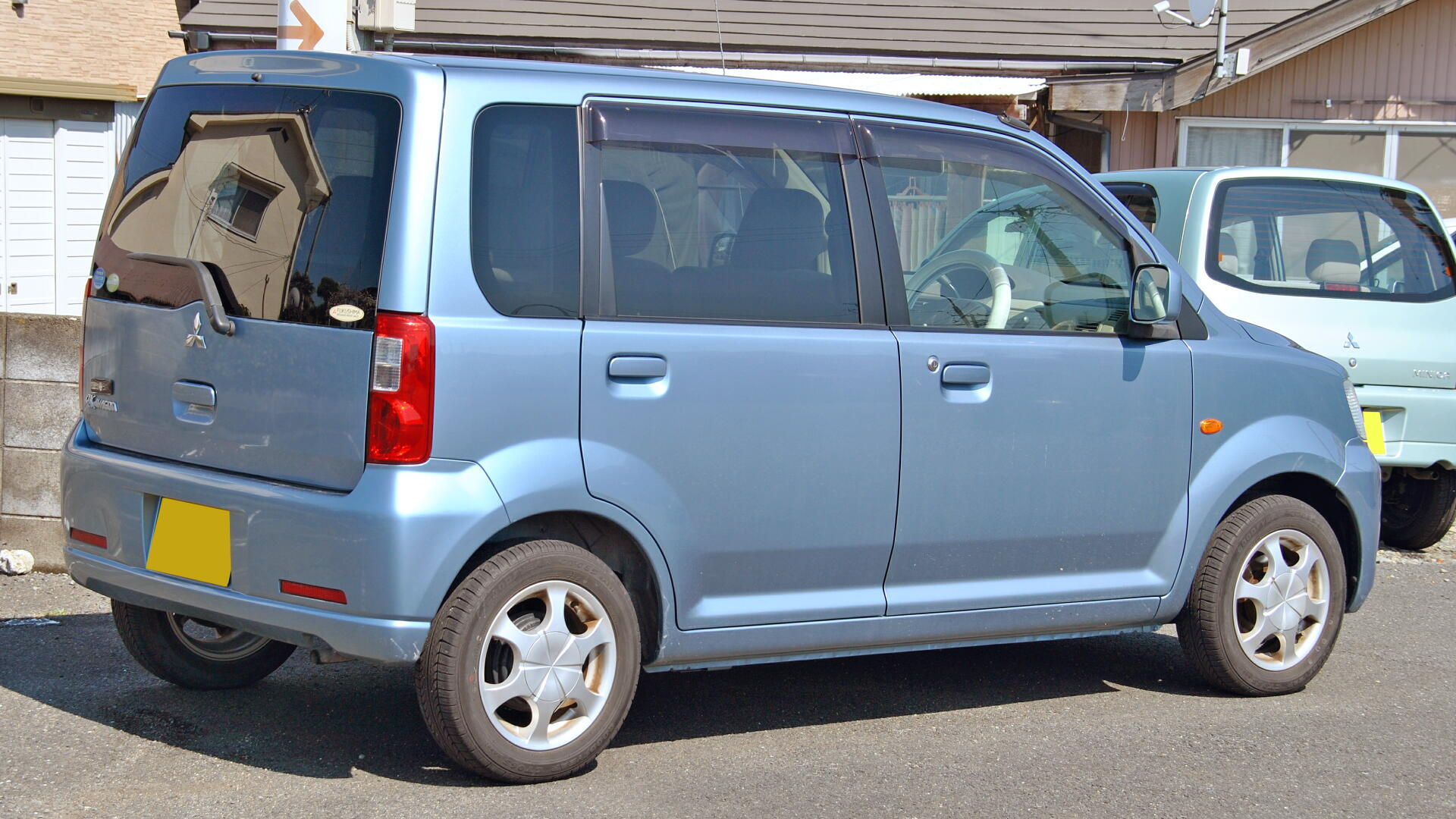
Mitsubishi eK Wagon (facelift)

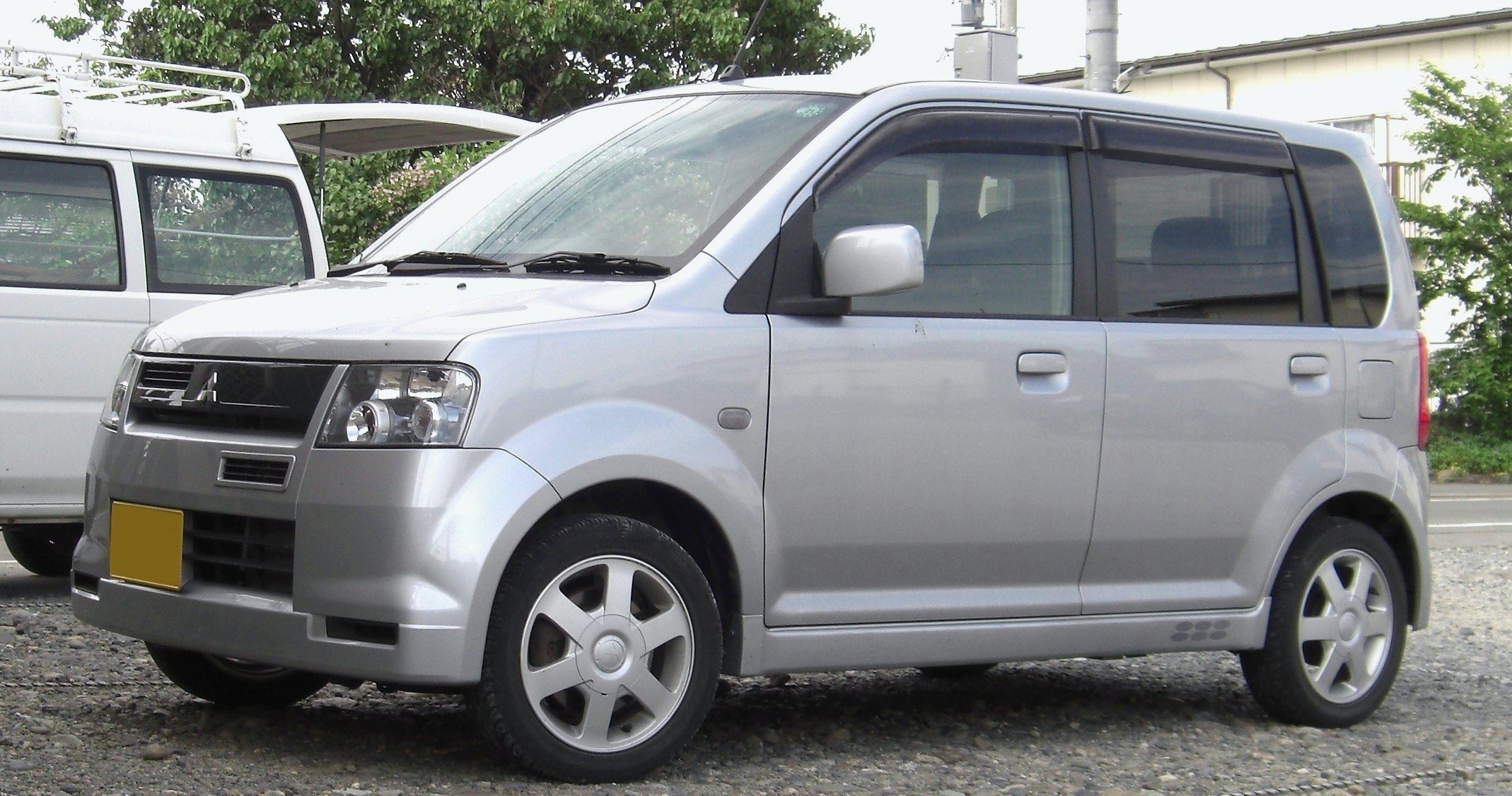
Mitsubishi eK Sport

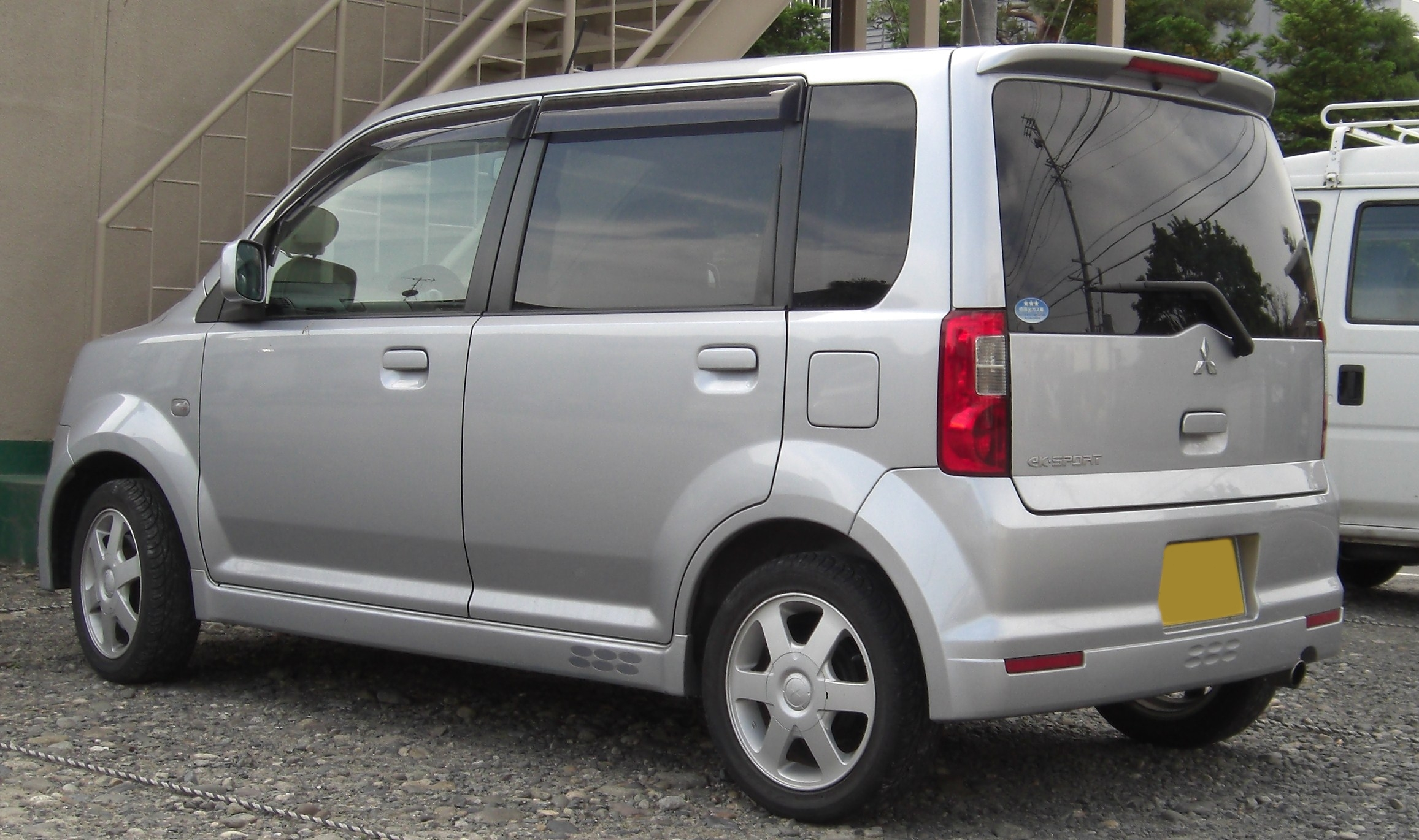
Mitsubishi eK Sport

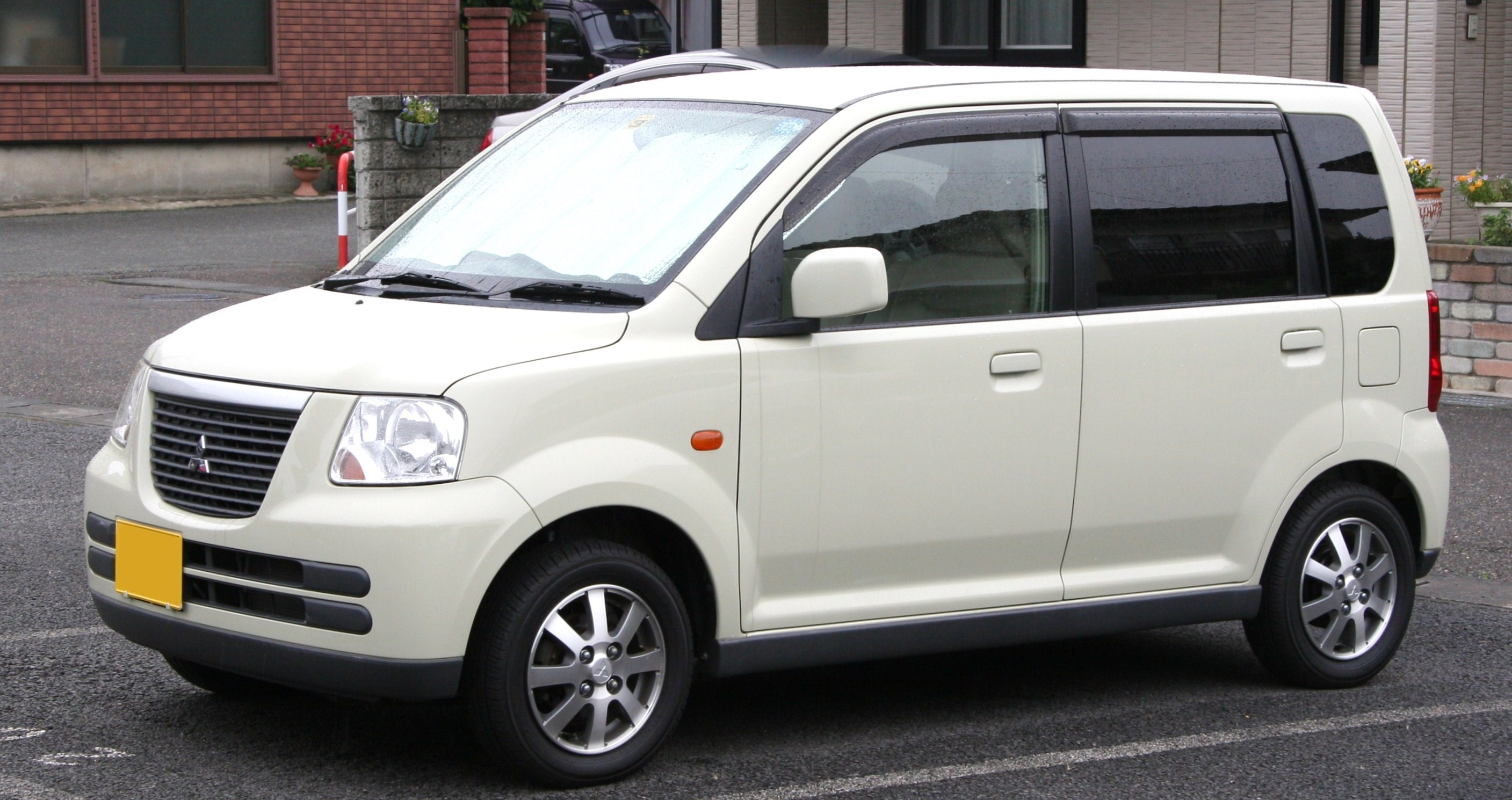
2004–2005 Mitsubishi eK Classy

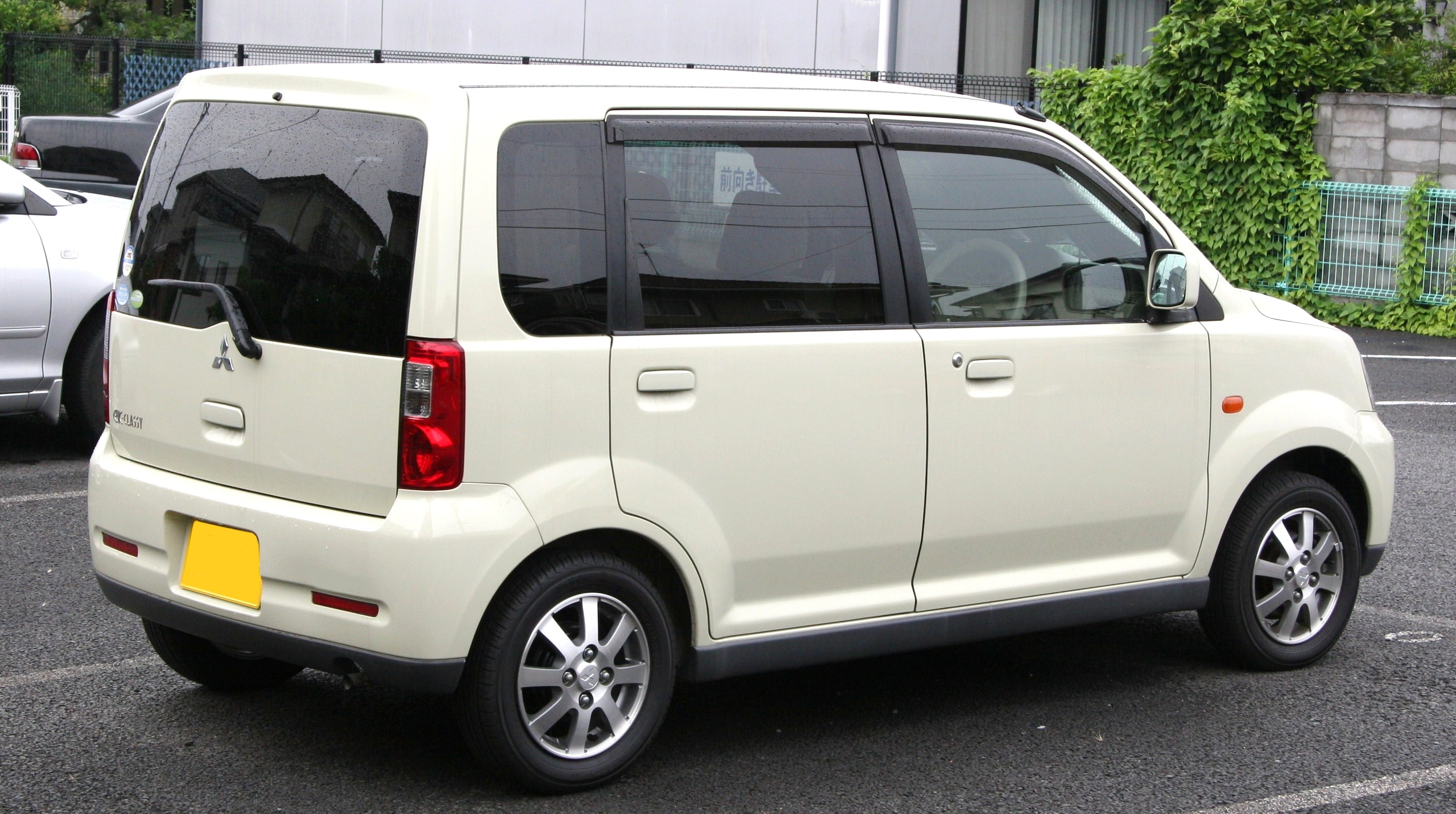
2004–2005 Mitsubishi eK Classy

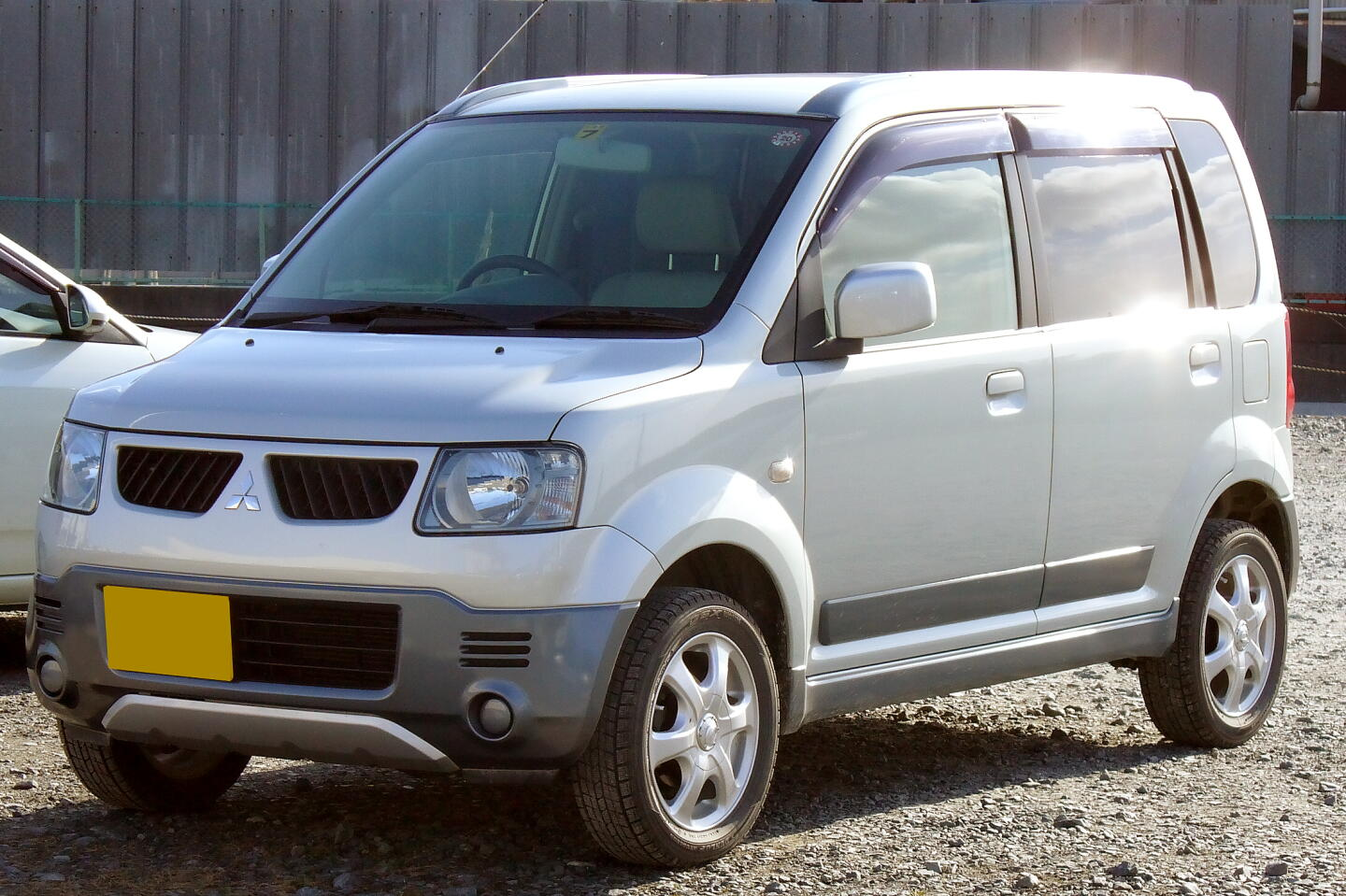
Mitsubishi eK Active

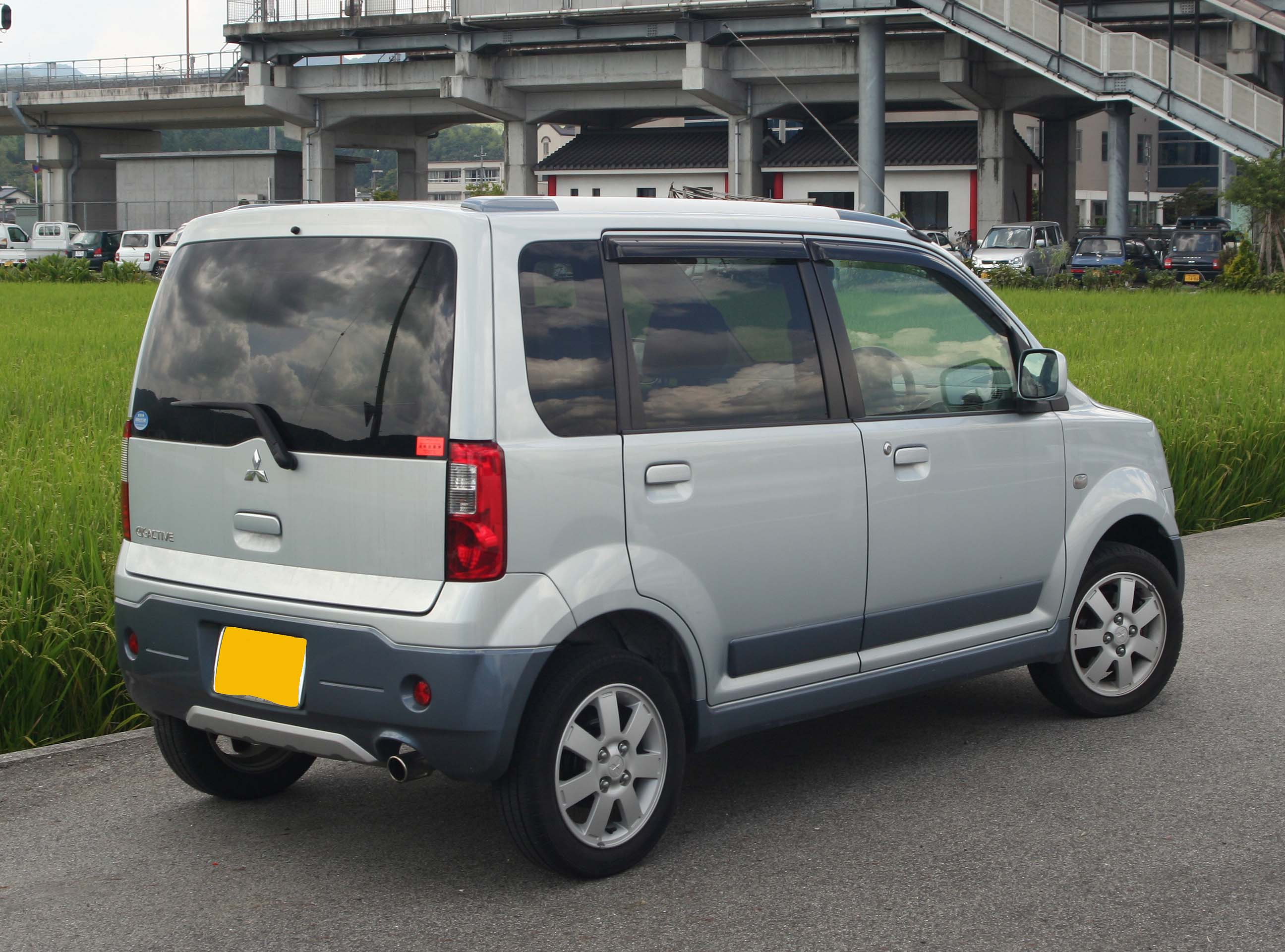
Mitsubishi eK Active

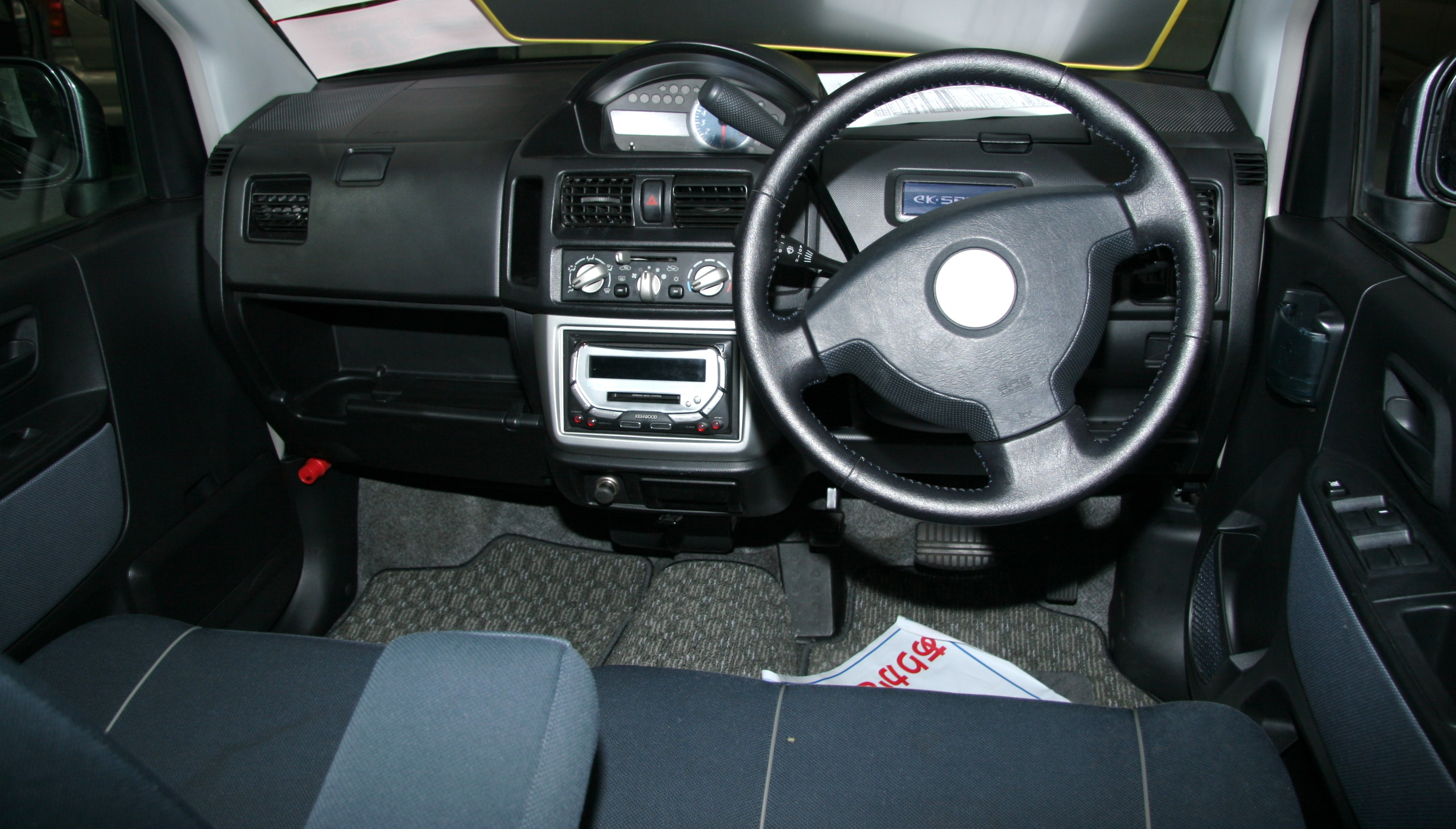
Mitsubishi eK Sport interior

Nissan Otti

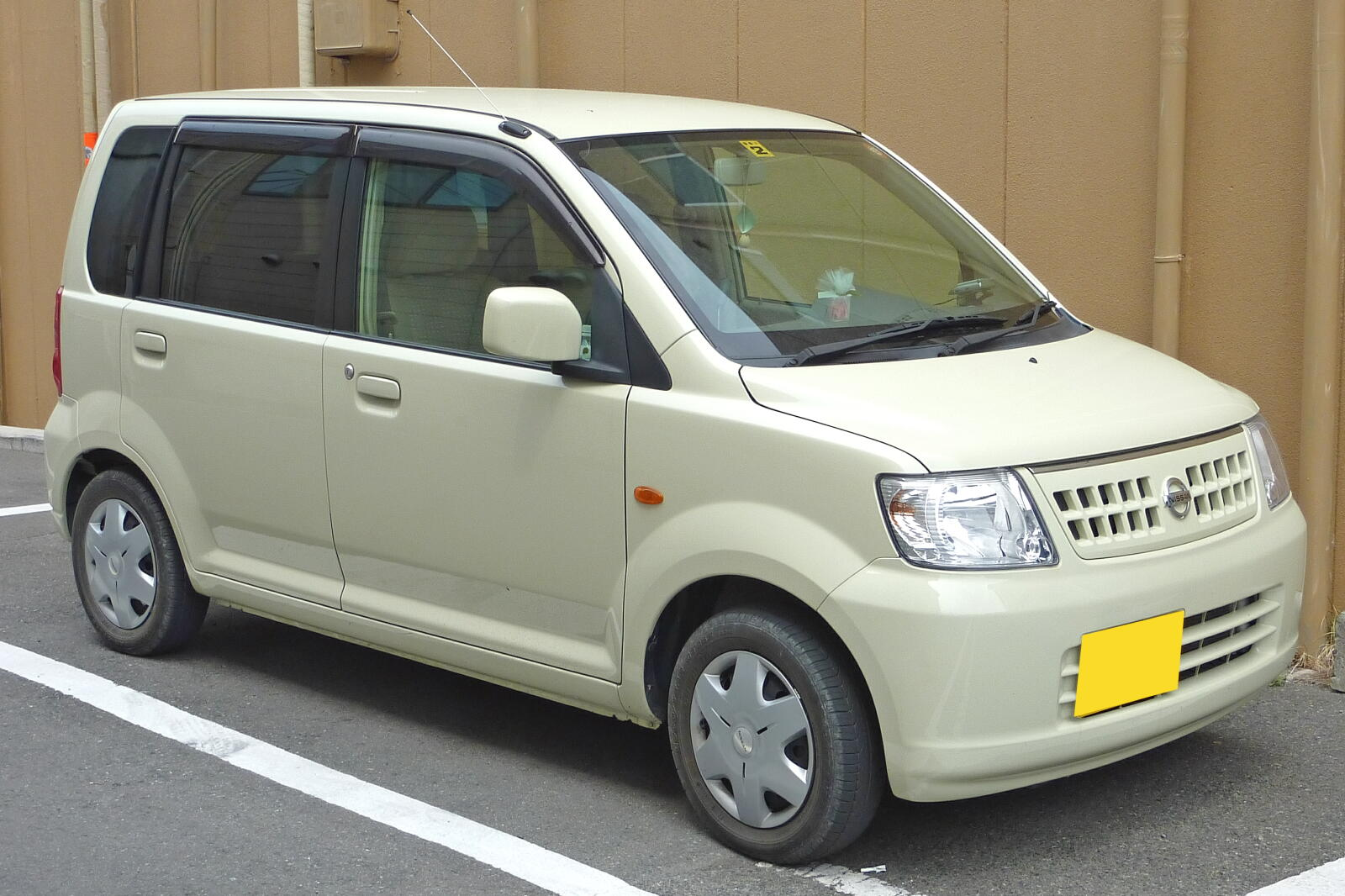
2005 Nissan Otti

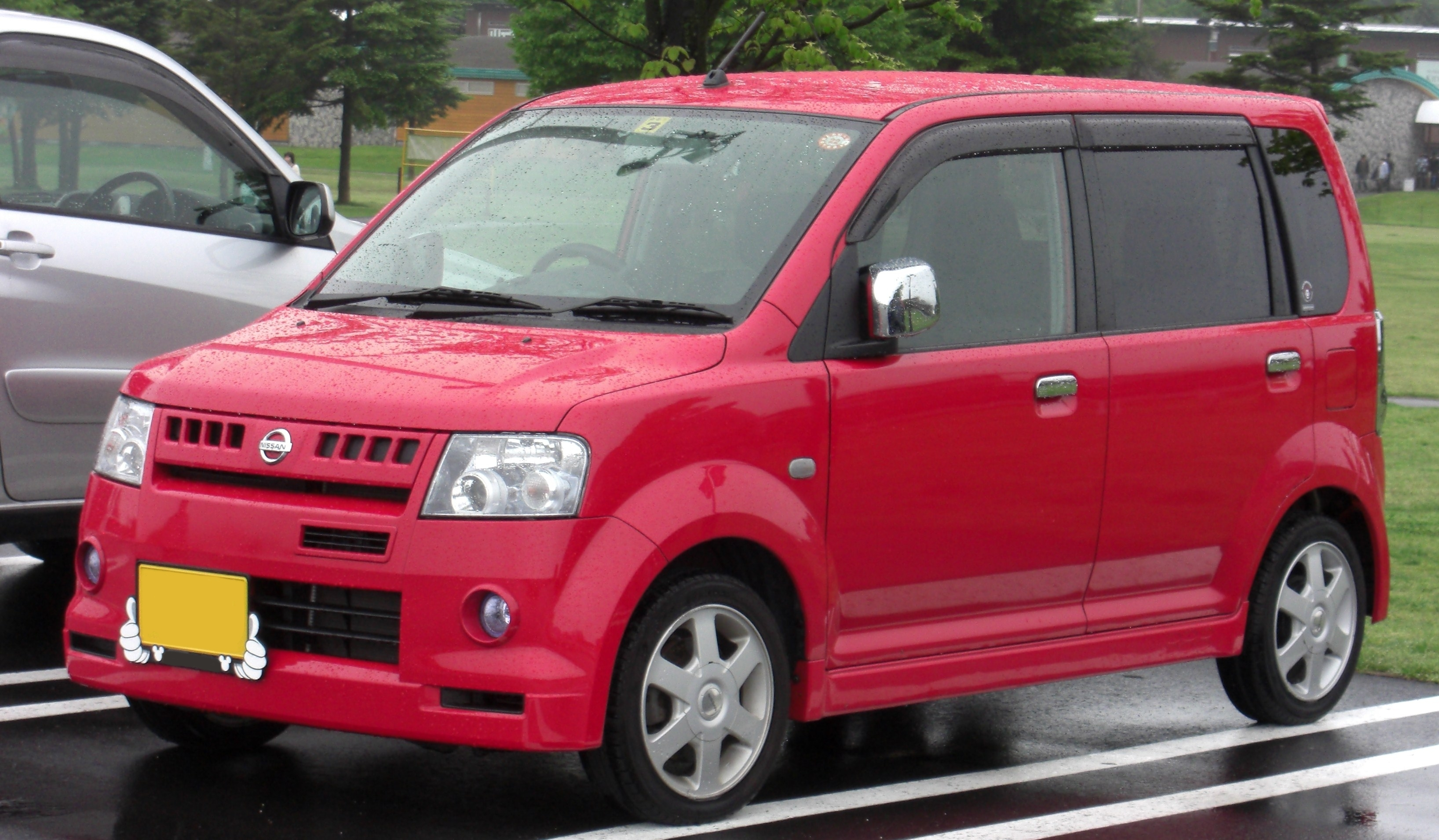
Nissan Otti RX

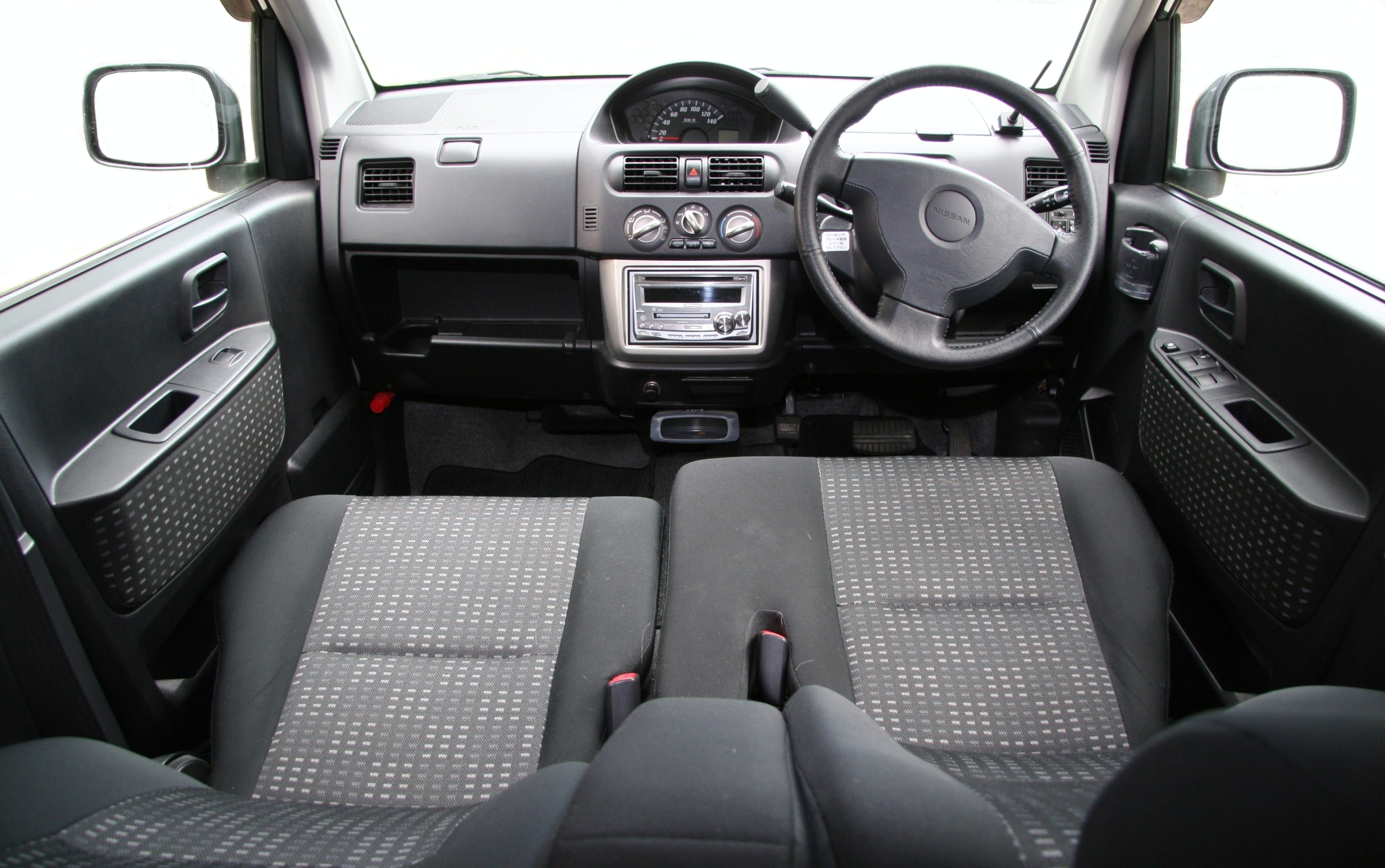
Nissan Otti interior

== Second generation (2006) ==
Second generation
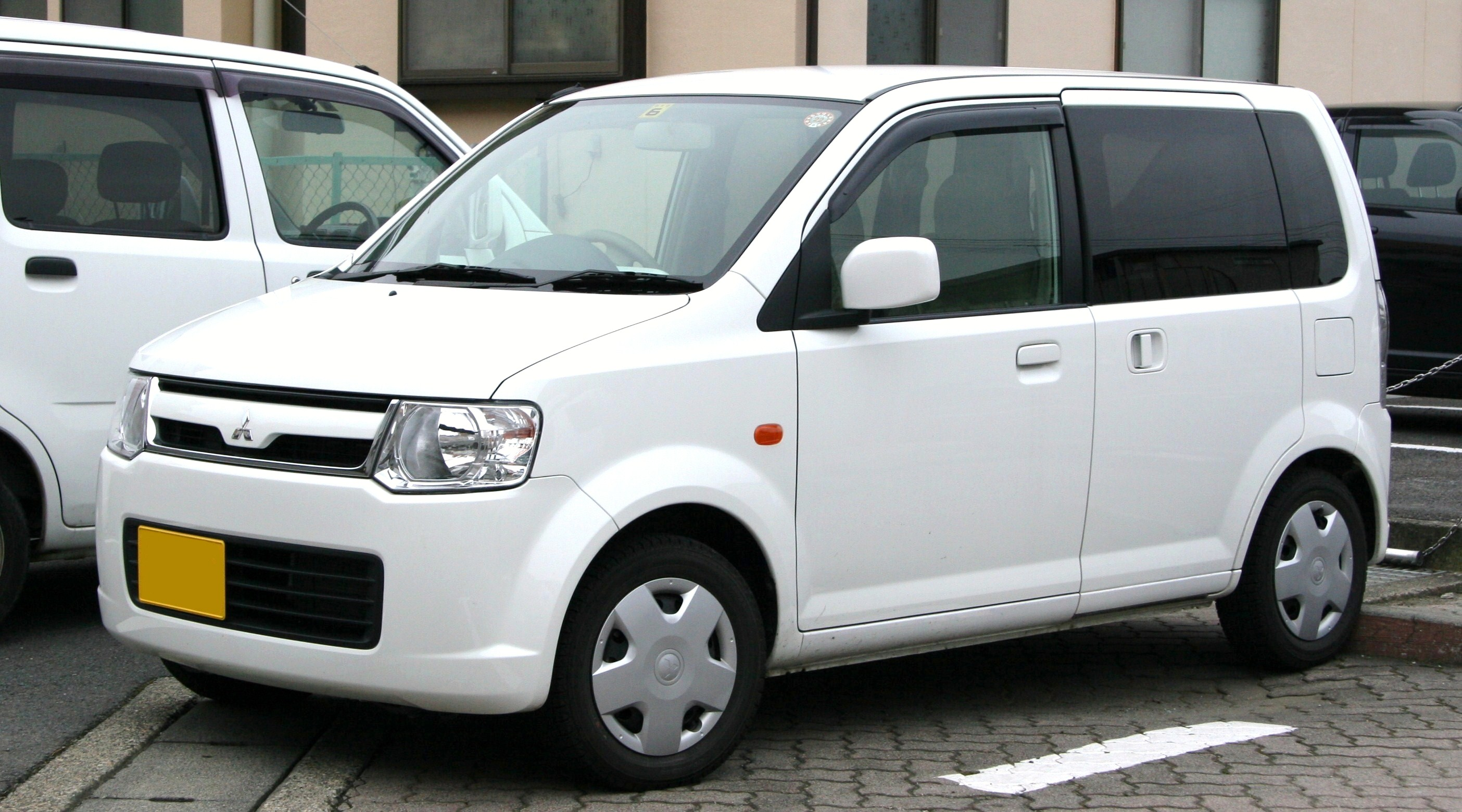
- Mitsubishi eK Wagon (pre-facelift)

Overview
- Model code: H82; H92; NA1
- Also called: Nissan Otti
- Production: September 2006 – February 2013 (eK series); October 2006 – June 2013 (Otti)

Body and chassis
- Related: Mitsubishi Toppo (H82A)

Powertrain
- Engine: 658 cc 3G83 I3 (petrol)
- Transmission: 5-speed manual; 3/4-speed automatic

Dimensions
- Wheelbase: 2,340 mm (92.1 in)
- Length: 3,395 mm (133.7 in)
- Width: 1,475 mm (58.1 in)
- Height: 1,550–1,570 mm (61.0–61.8 in)
- Curb weight: 820–900 kg (1,808–1,984 lb)

The second generation eK Wagon and eK Sport were released on 13 September 2006. The eK Active was discontinued at the time of the second generation's launch. A facelifted eK Wagon and eK Sport were released on 21 August 2008. The car sported a sliding door on the passenger side, which was unusual for its class and a layout which was abandoned for the third generation.

A rebodied version of this generation became the fourth generation Toppo as well, using some body panels of the third generation Toppo. For the next generation, this became the Mitsubishi eK Space.

Mitsubishi eK

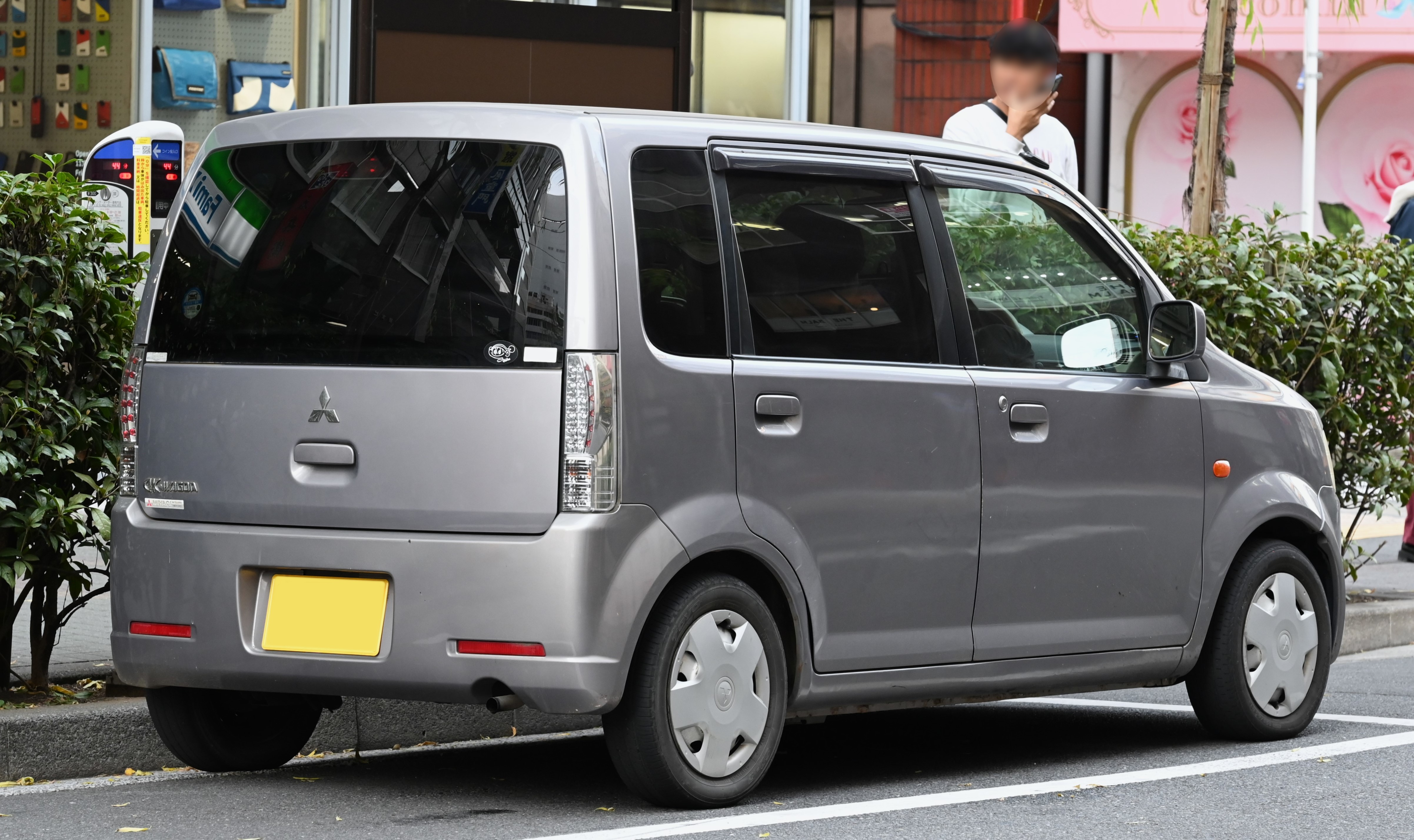
Mitsubishi eK Wagon (pre-facelift)

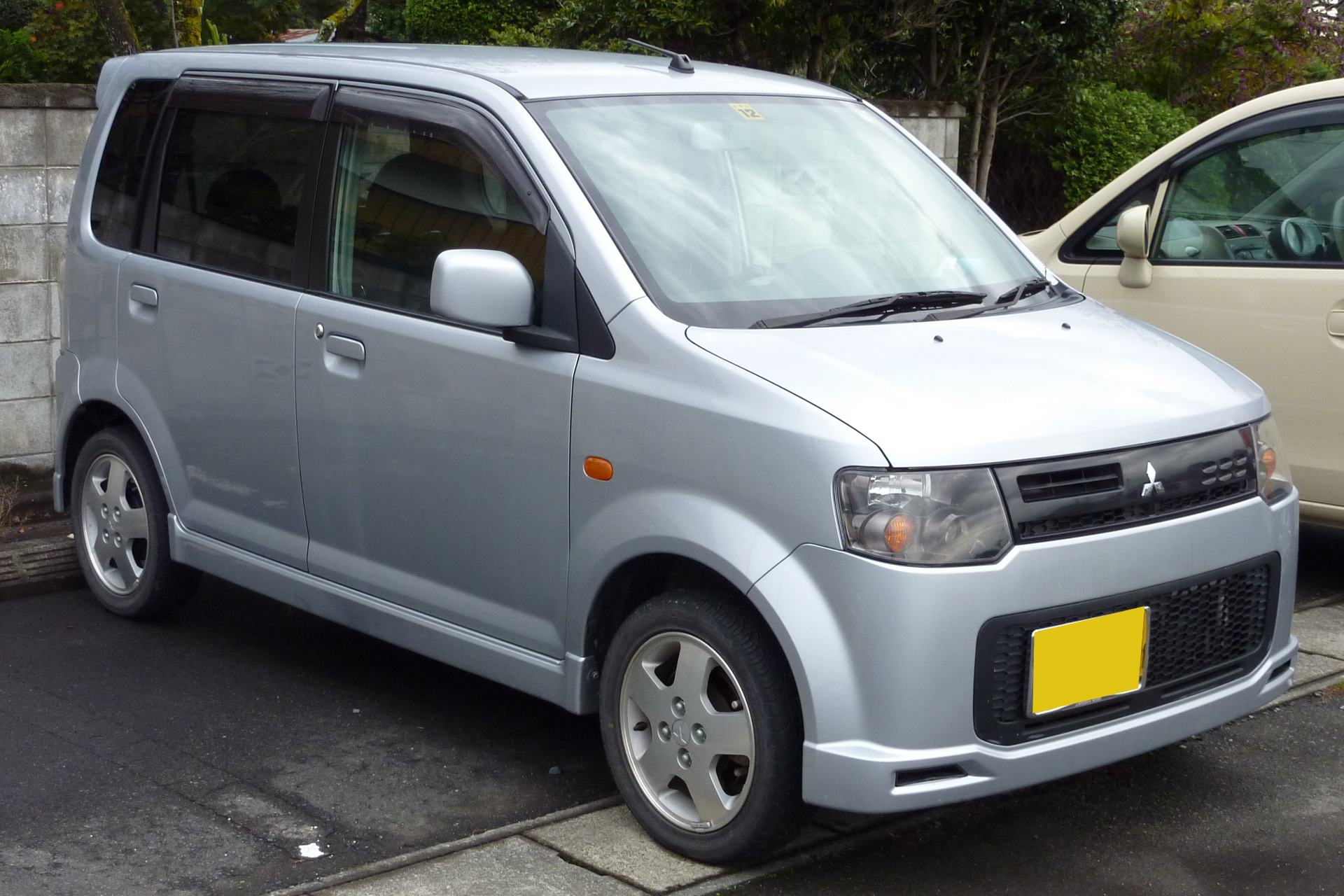
Mitsubishi eK Sport (pre-facelift)

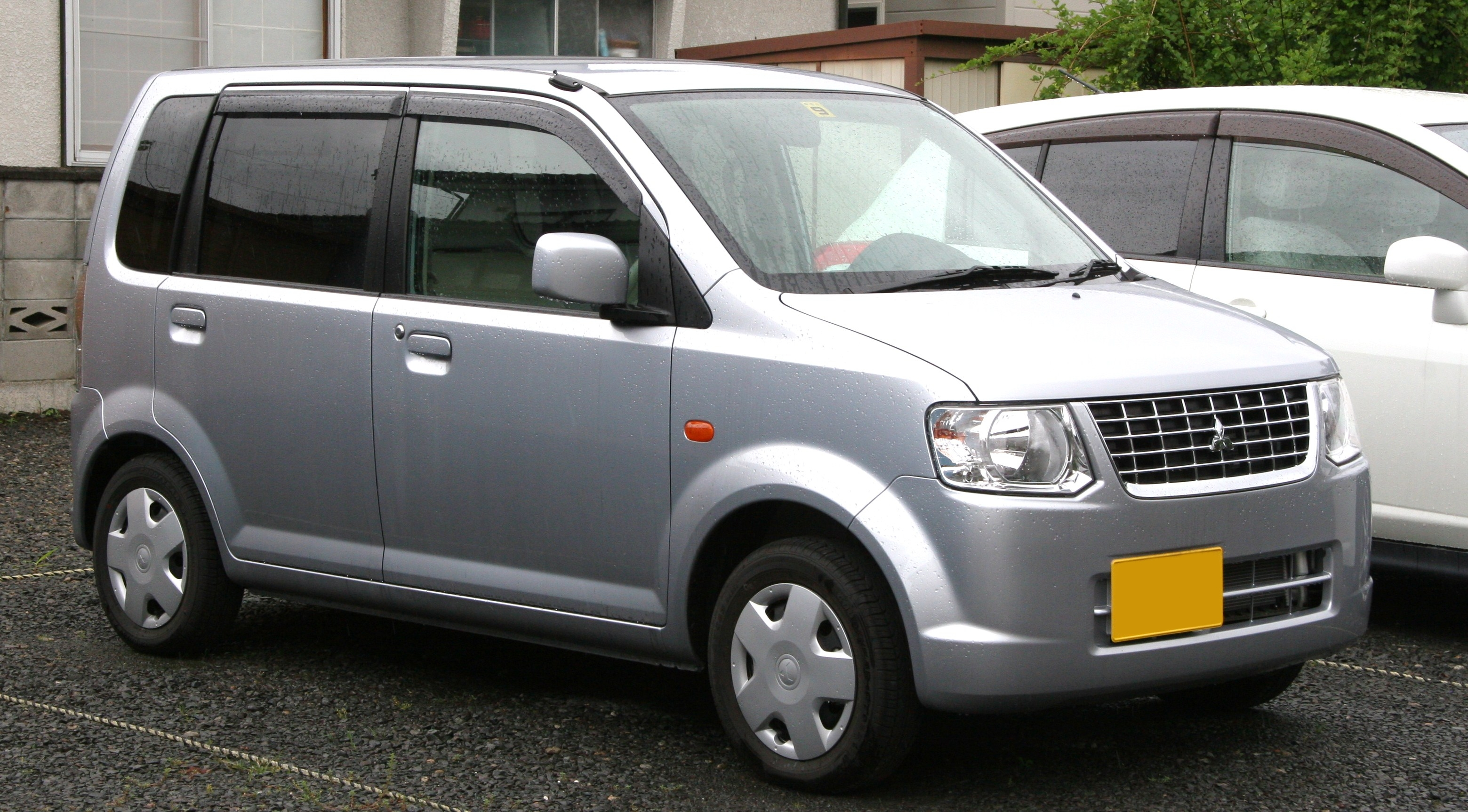
Mitsubishi eK Wagon (facelift)

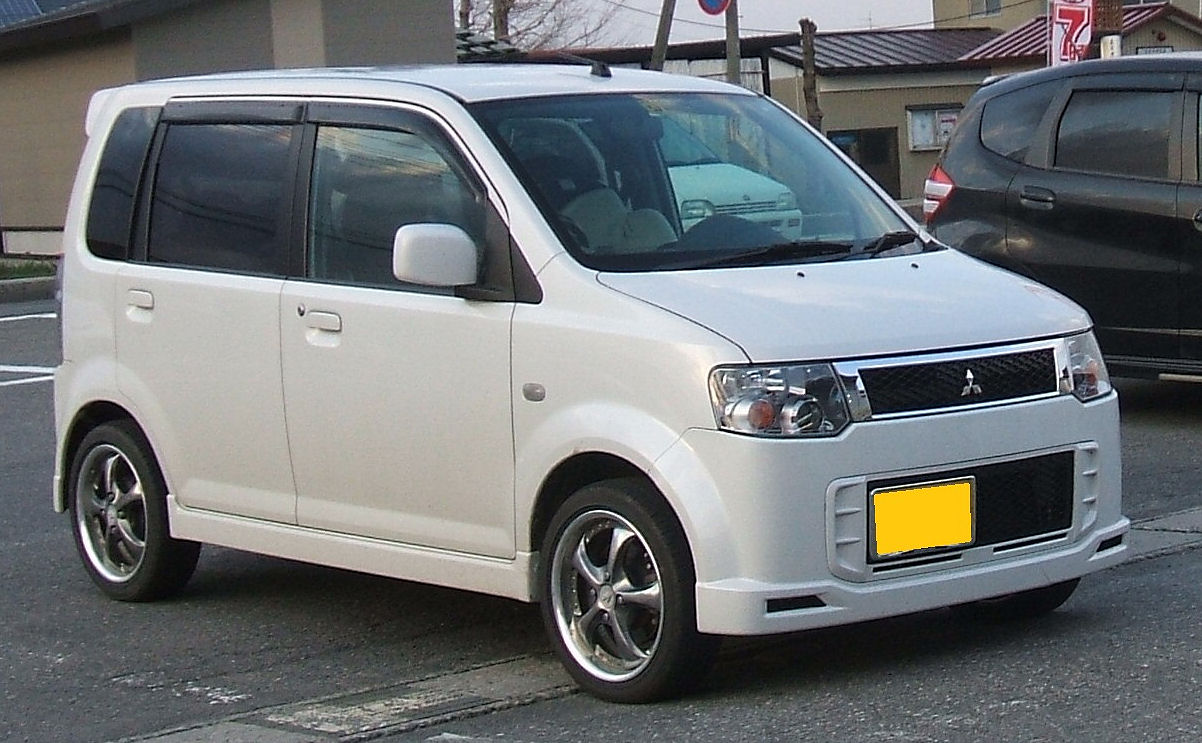
Mitsubishi eK Sport (facelift)

=== Nissan Otti ===
In September 2006, the second generation Otti was unveiled on 3 October in the same year. The engine and platform and other mechanical components were completely carried over from the first generation such as the 3G83 engine, and the body size was also almost identical to the first generation. The Otti also had a customized car called the Rider by Autech, which is the first kei car model product which had a Rider model.

Another minor facelift was released in September 2008. The Otti was discontinued in 2013, and replaced by the Dayz

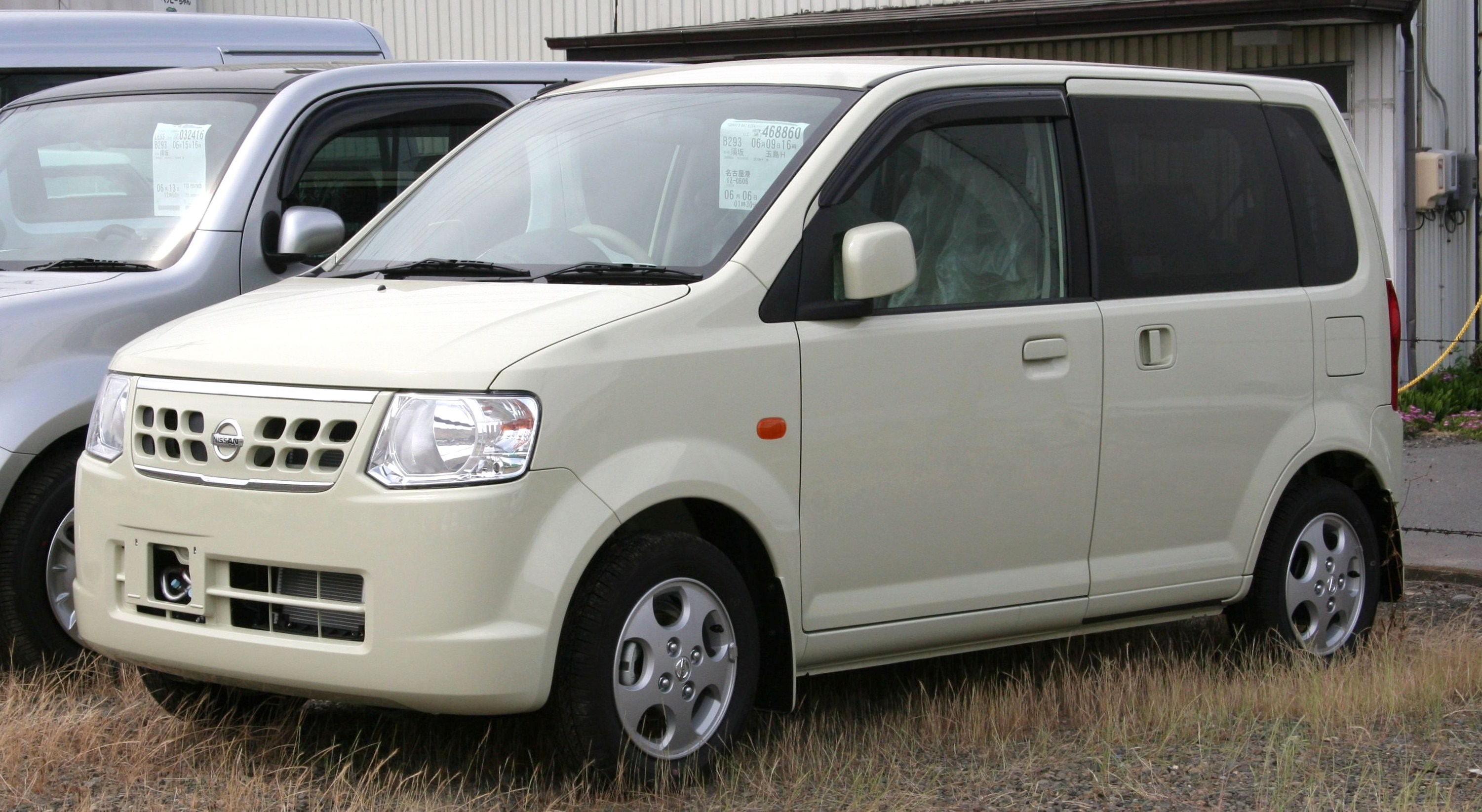
Nissan Otti

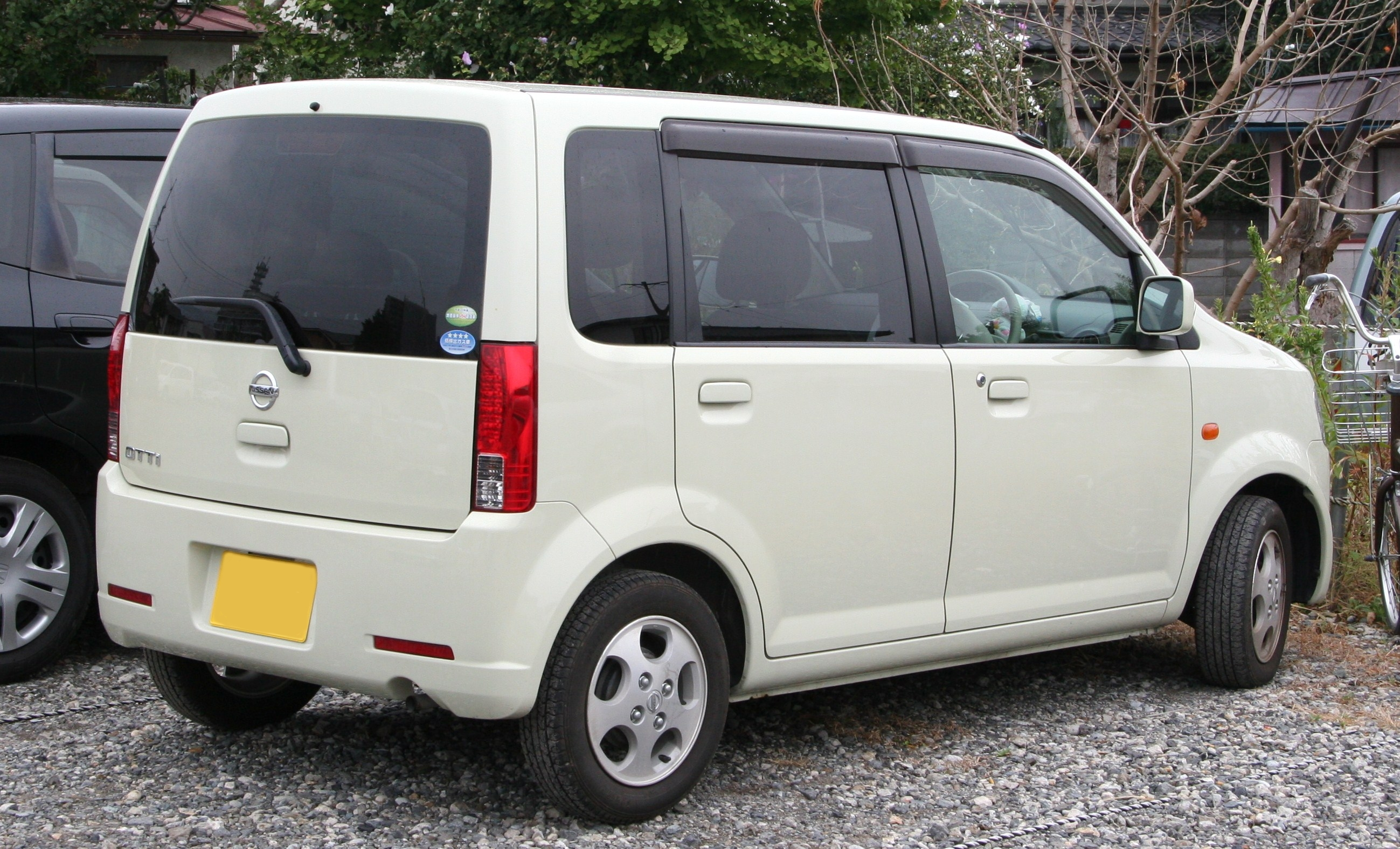
Nissan Otti

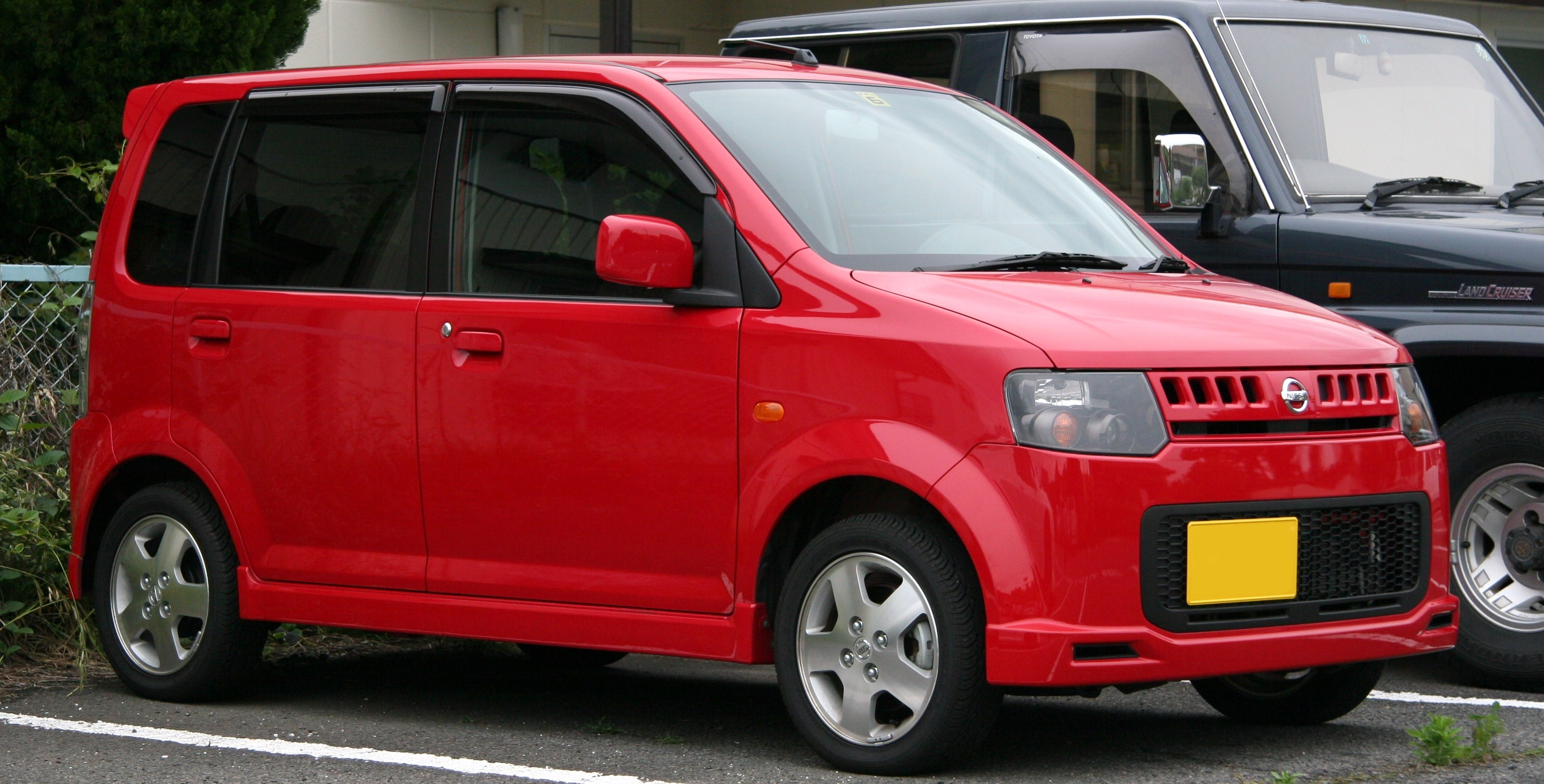
Nissan Otti RX/RZ

Nissan Otti Rider

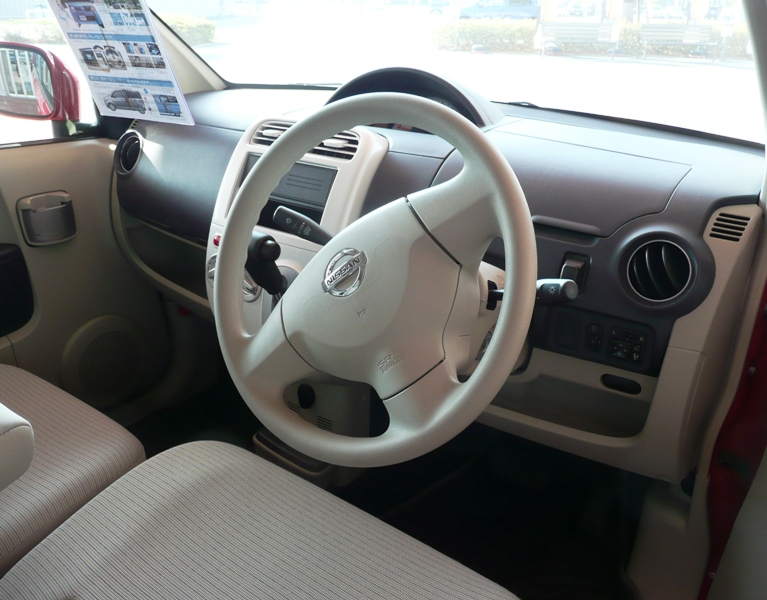
Nissan Otti interior

== Third generation (2013) ==
Third generation
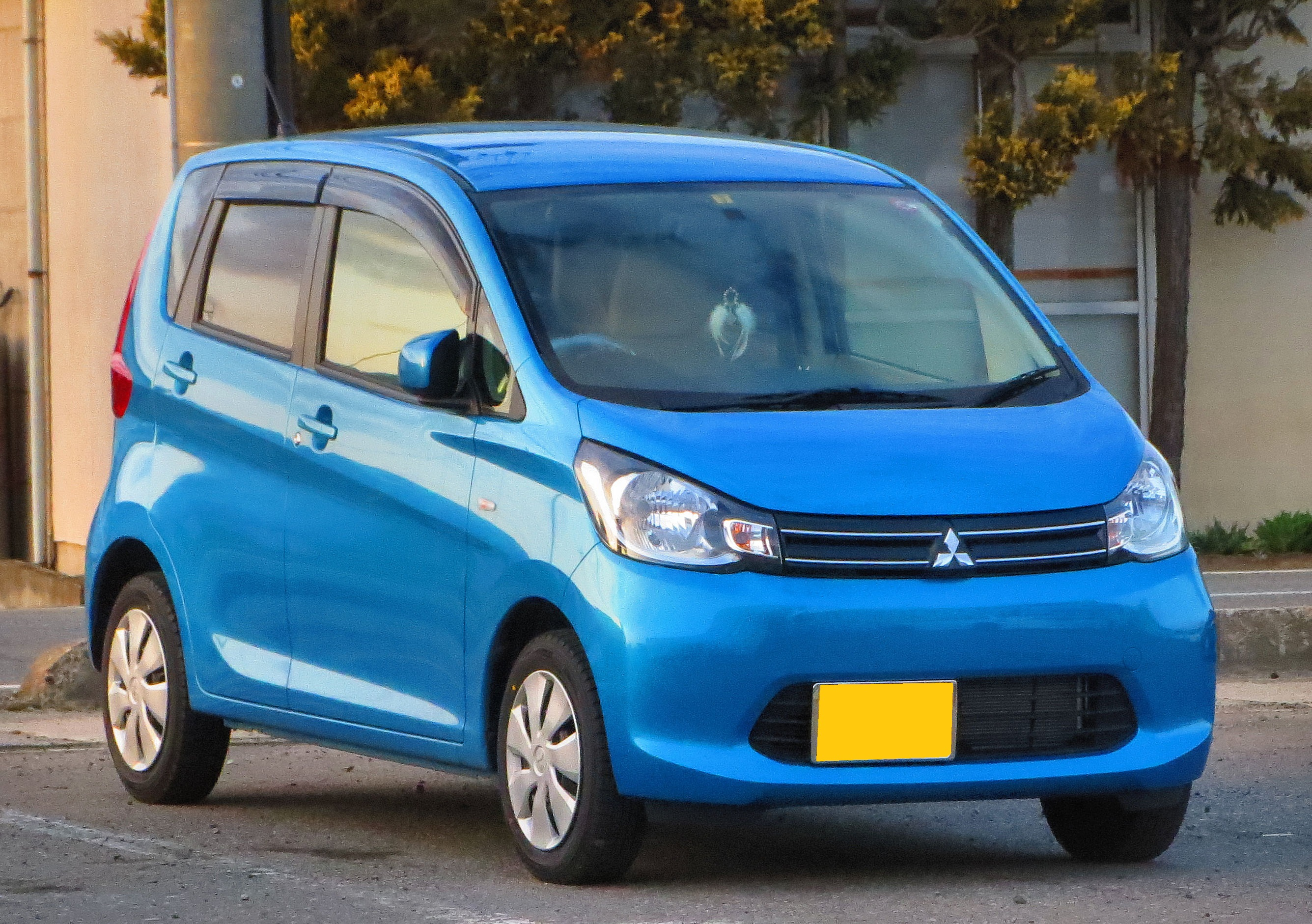

Overview
- Model code: B11; B21; AA0
- Also called: Nissan Dayz
- Production: June 2013 – March 2019

Body and chassis
- Related: Mitsubishi eK Space (first generation)

Powertrain
- Engine: 658 cc 3B20 I3; 658 cc 3B20T turbo I3
- Transmission: CVT

Dimensions
- Wheelbase: 2,430 mm (95.7 in)
- Length: 3,395 mm (133.7 in)
- Width: 1,475 mm (58.1 in)
- Height: 1,620 mm (63.8 in)
- Curb weight: 820–900 kg (1,808–1,984 lb)

The third generation eK Wagon and its new sportier variant, called the eK Custom, were released on June 2013. It was the first major design update since when the eK began sales. This time, Nissan's derivative was sold as the Nissan Dayz, while the eK Custom was sold as the Nissan Dayz Highway Star.

The eK received a facelift in October 2015. While the Dayz received the facelift on 23 October 2015. The new Autech Bolero was added. Features a chrome-plated front grille and a rounded front bumper.

The Active Gear grade was released in December 2017. This is the fourth model in the Active Gear series, following the Delica, Outlander, and RVR, is based on the turbo charged "T Safety Package." The exterior features an orange accent line on the front grille, orange -coloured door mirrors, and black 15-inch alloy wheels.

=== Fuel economy scandal ===
In April 2016, Mitsubishi Motors announced that it had discovered improper fuel-economy testing procedures affecting several kei car models, including the Mitsubishi eK, eK Space, and the OEM-supplied Nissan Dayz and Dayz Roox. The company admitted that employees had manipulated fuel-consumption data by using testing methods that did not comply with Japanese regulations. Approximately 625,000 vehicles were affected, including cars supplied to Nissan. The disclosure caused Mitsubishi Motors’ share price to fall sharply and led to widespread criticism of the company’s corporate governance and quality-control practices.

Following an investigation by the Japanese government, Mitsubishi acknowledged that improper testing practices had been used for decades on some models. Company president Tetsuro Aikawa resigned in June 2016, accepting responsibility for the scandal.

Despite the controversy, production of the eK series continued under the joint venture NMKV, with later generations redesigned to meet updated fuel-efficiency and safety standards. Sales restarted in July of the same year.

Mitsubishi eK

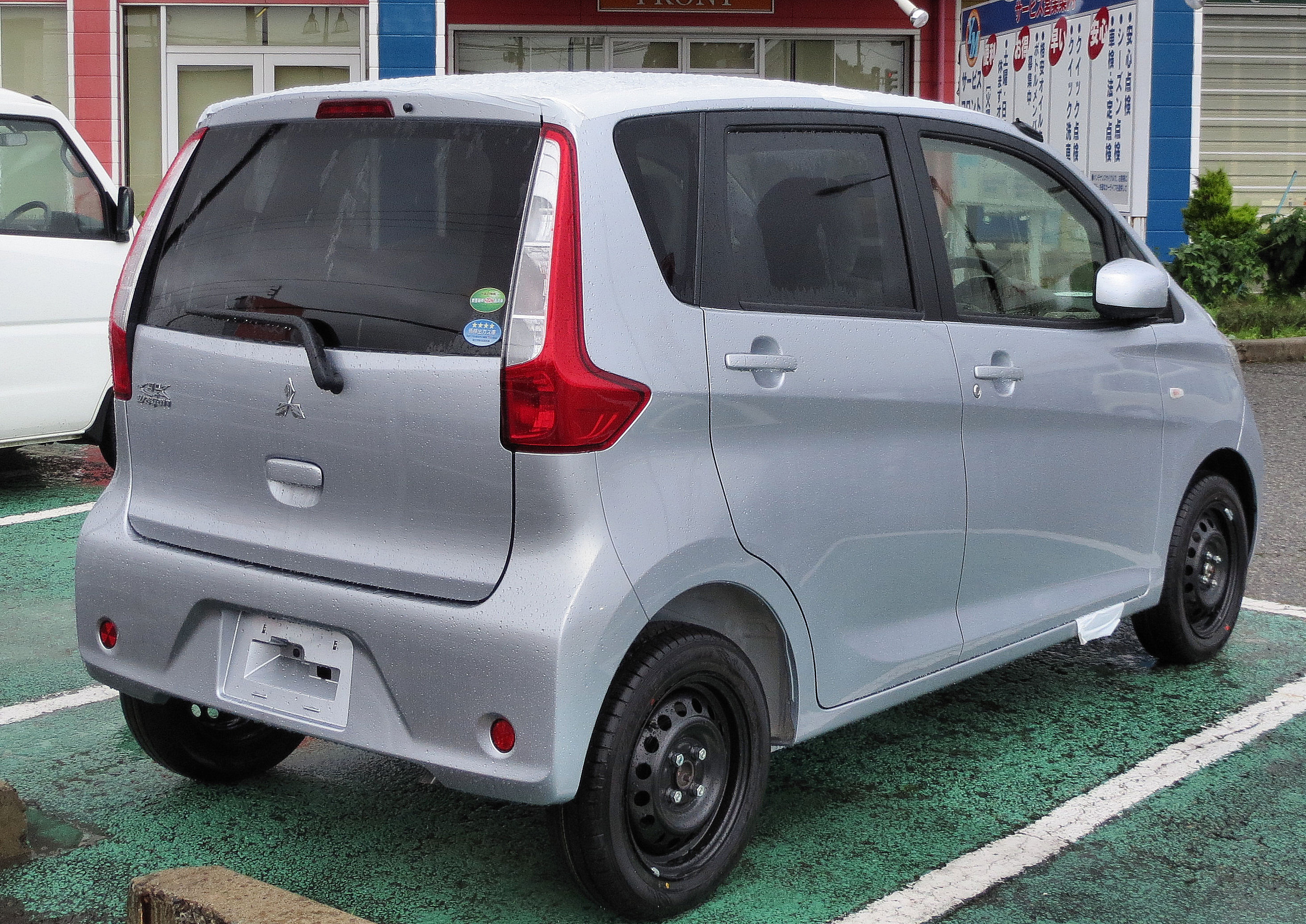
Rear view

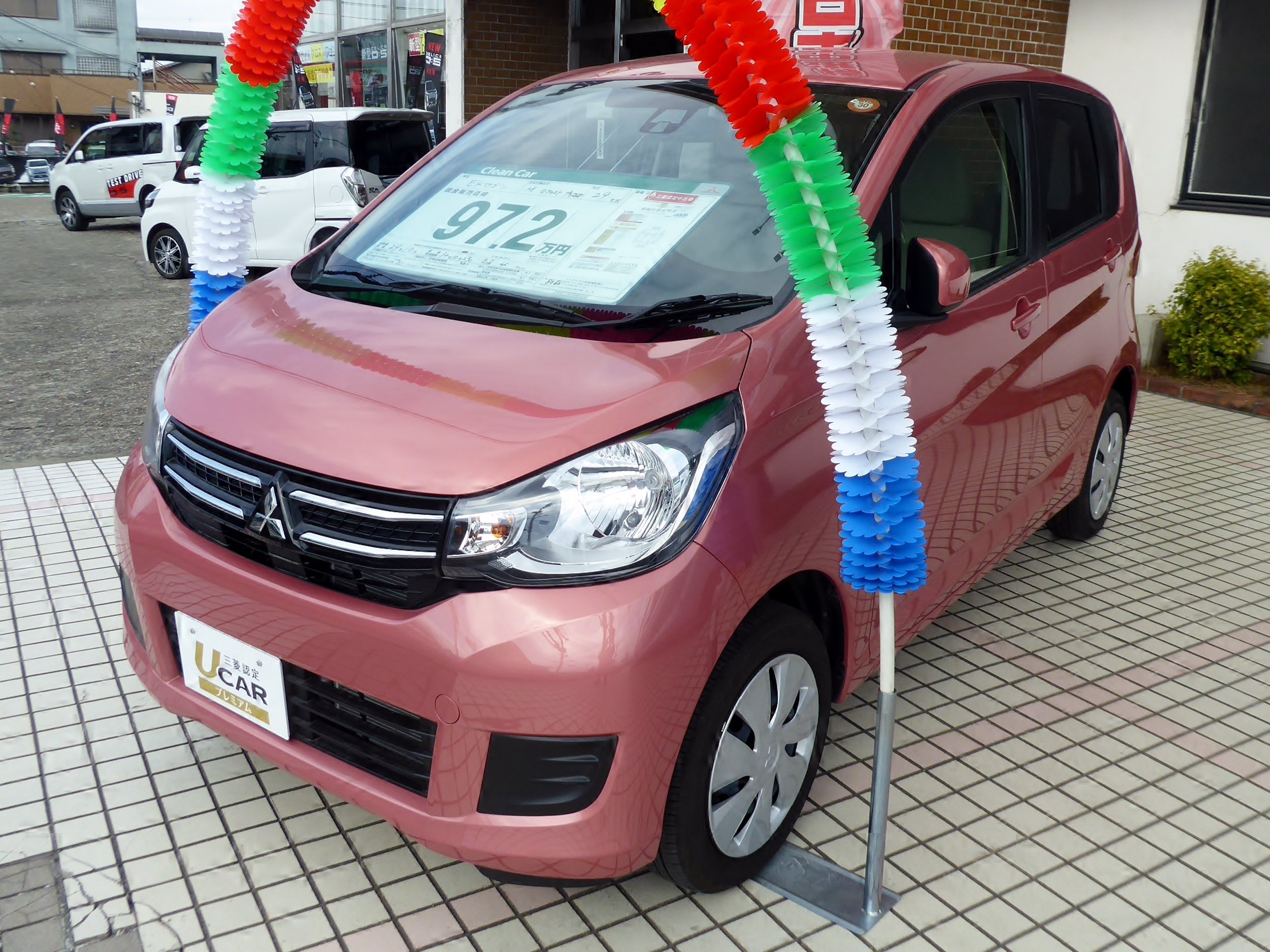
Mitsubishi eK Wagon (facelift)

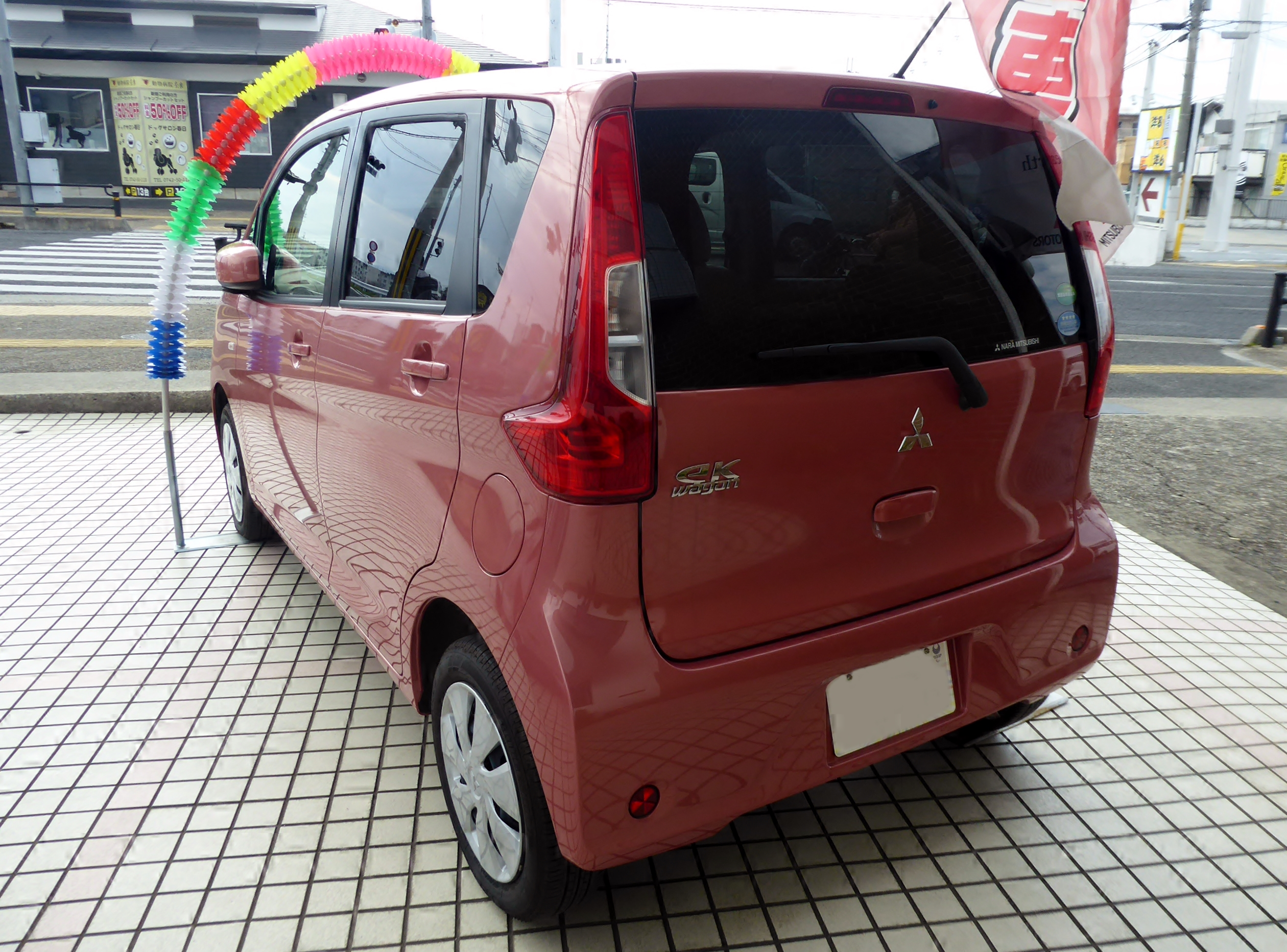
Rear view

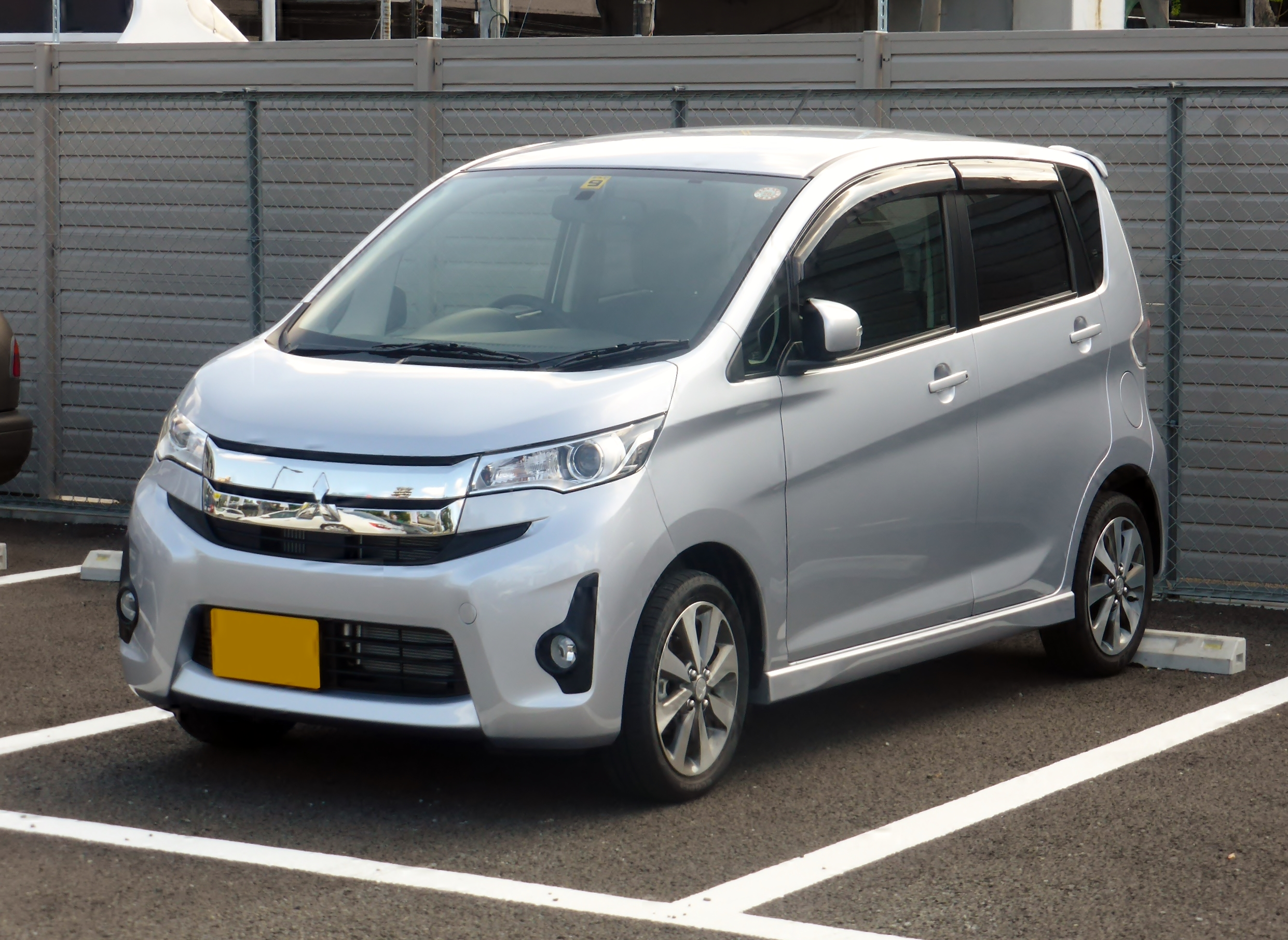
Mitsubishi eK Custom

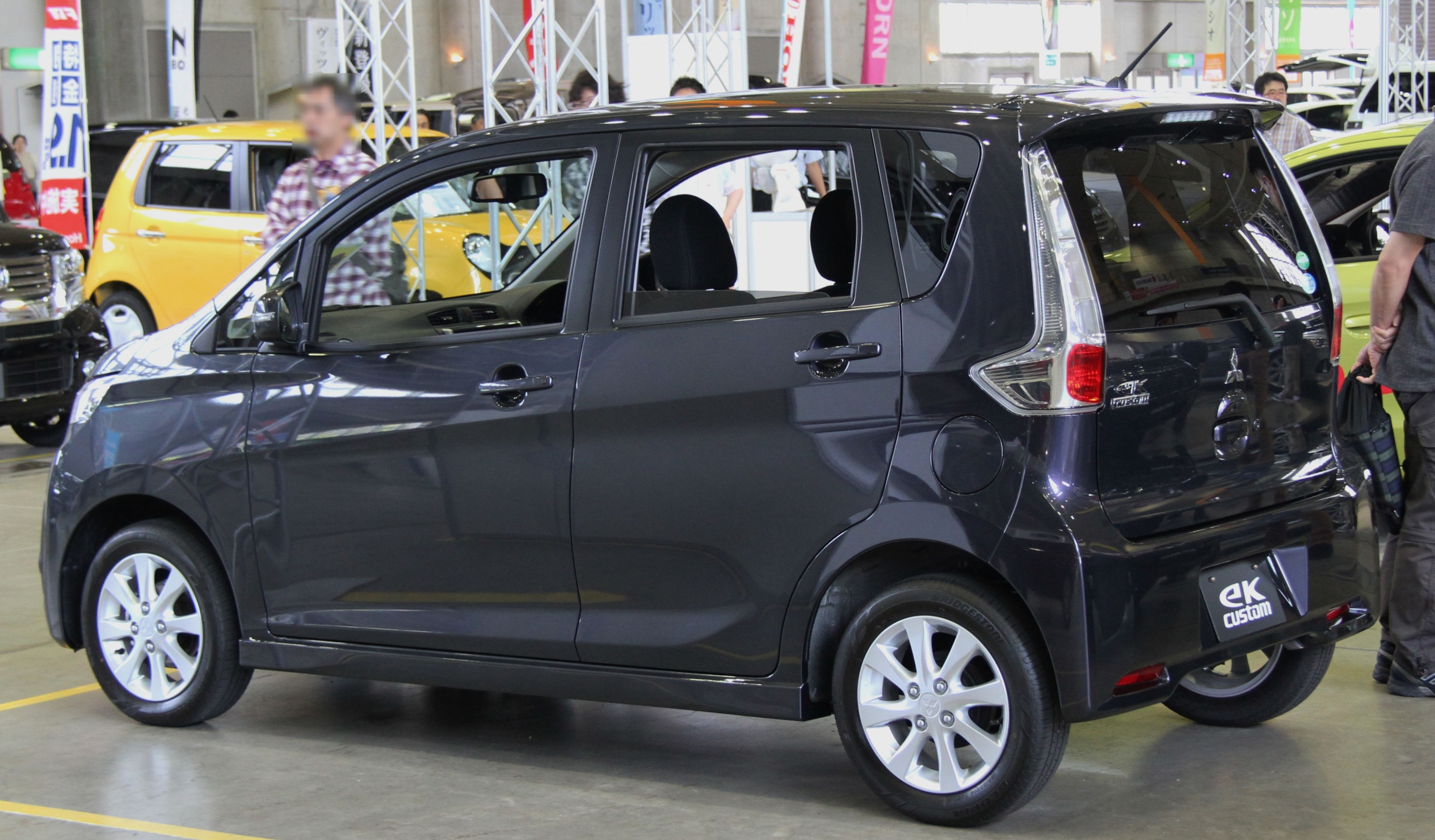
Mitsubishi eK Custom rear view

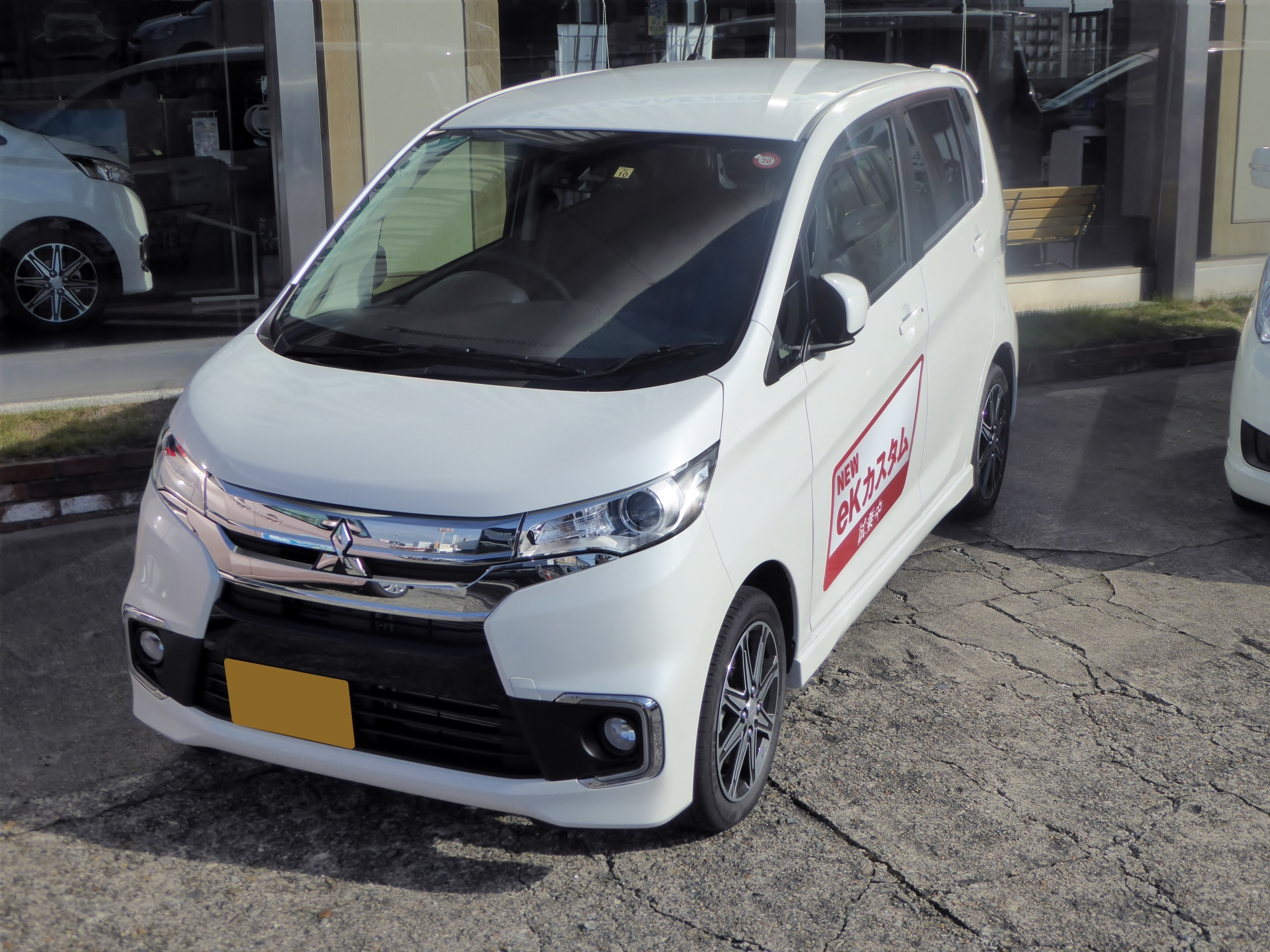
Mitsubishi eK Custom (facelift)

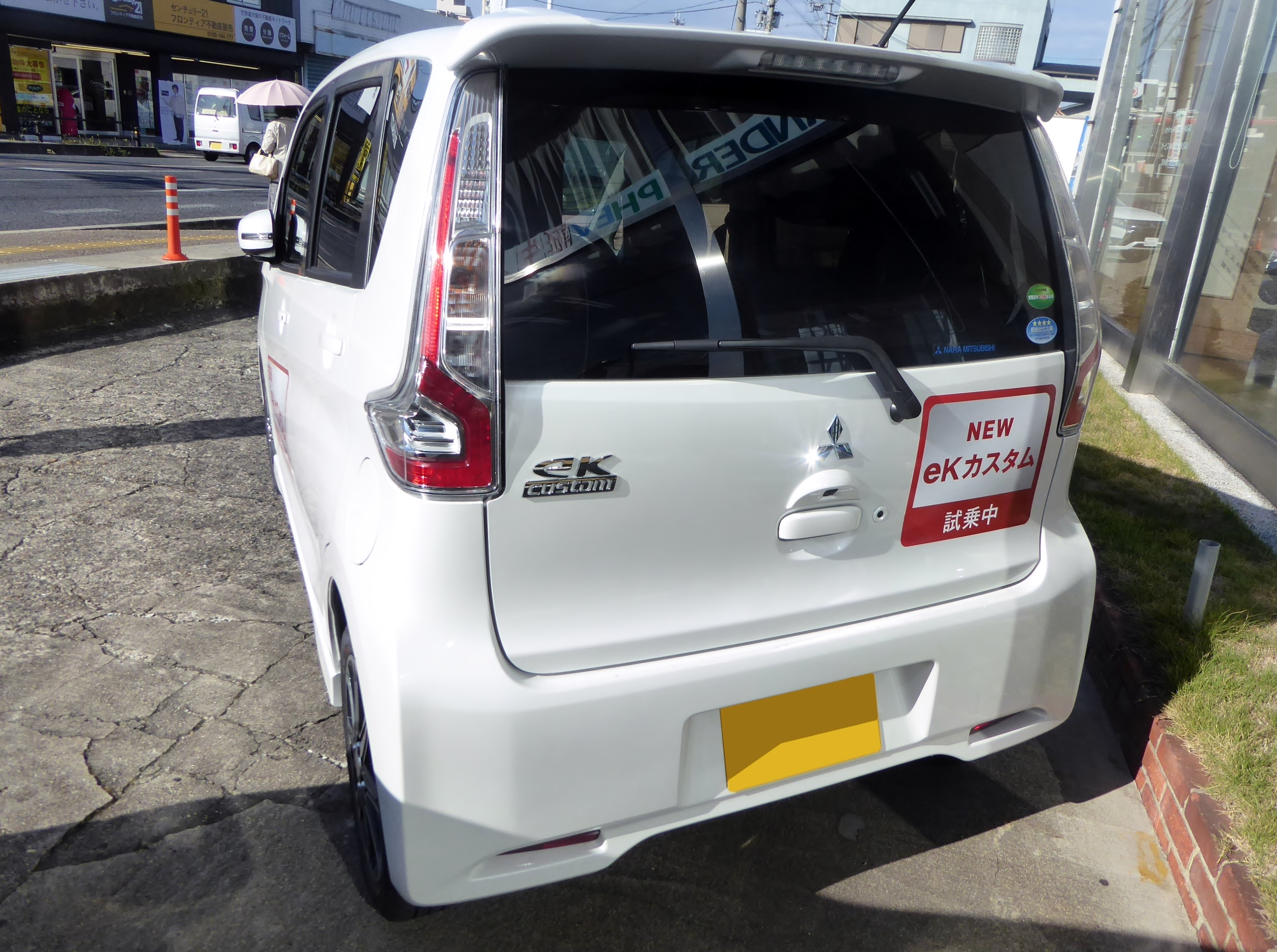
Mitsubishi eK Custom (facelift) rear view

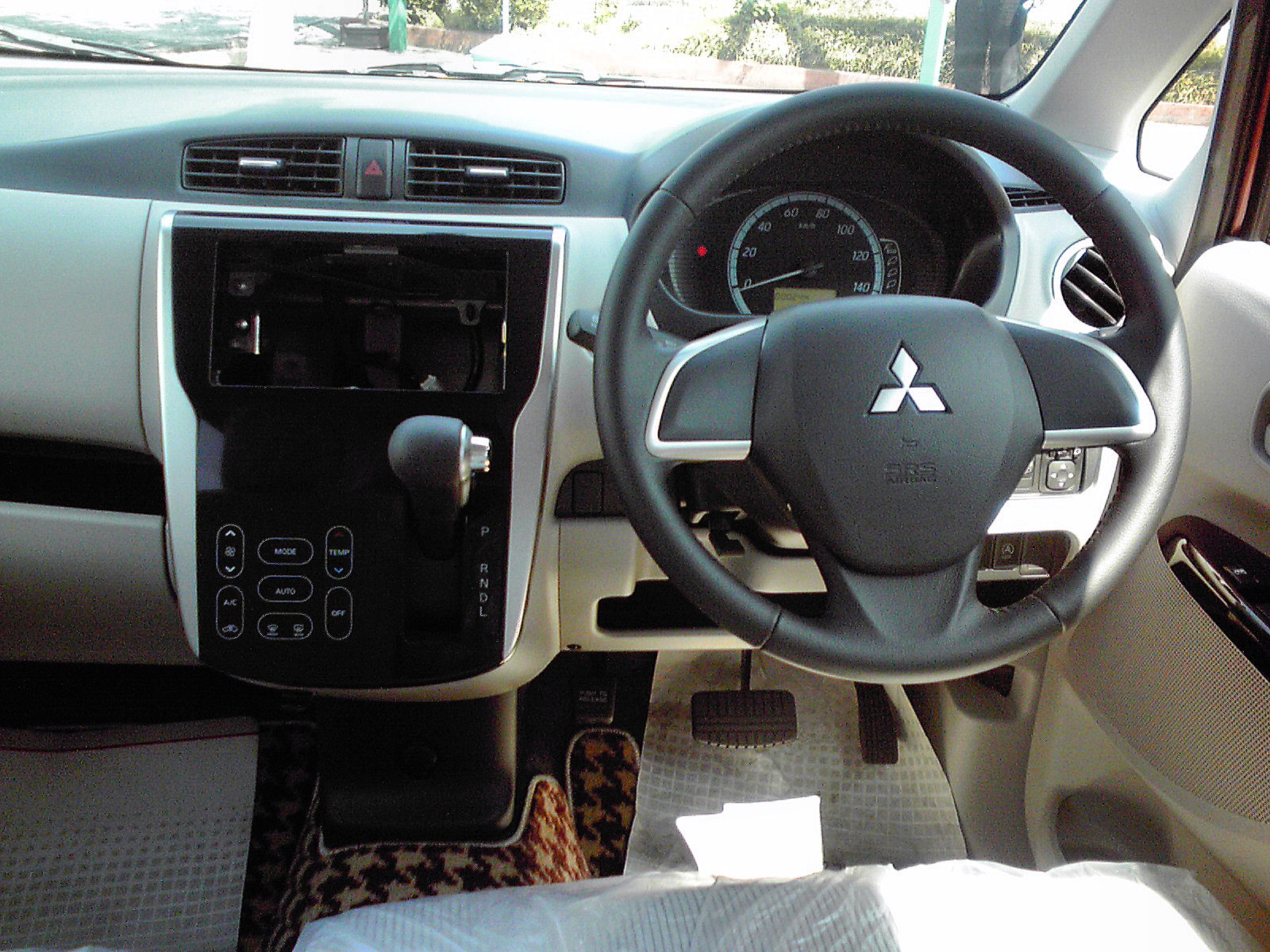
Interior

Nissan Dayz

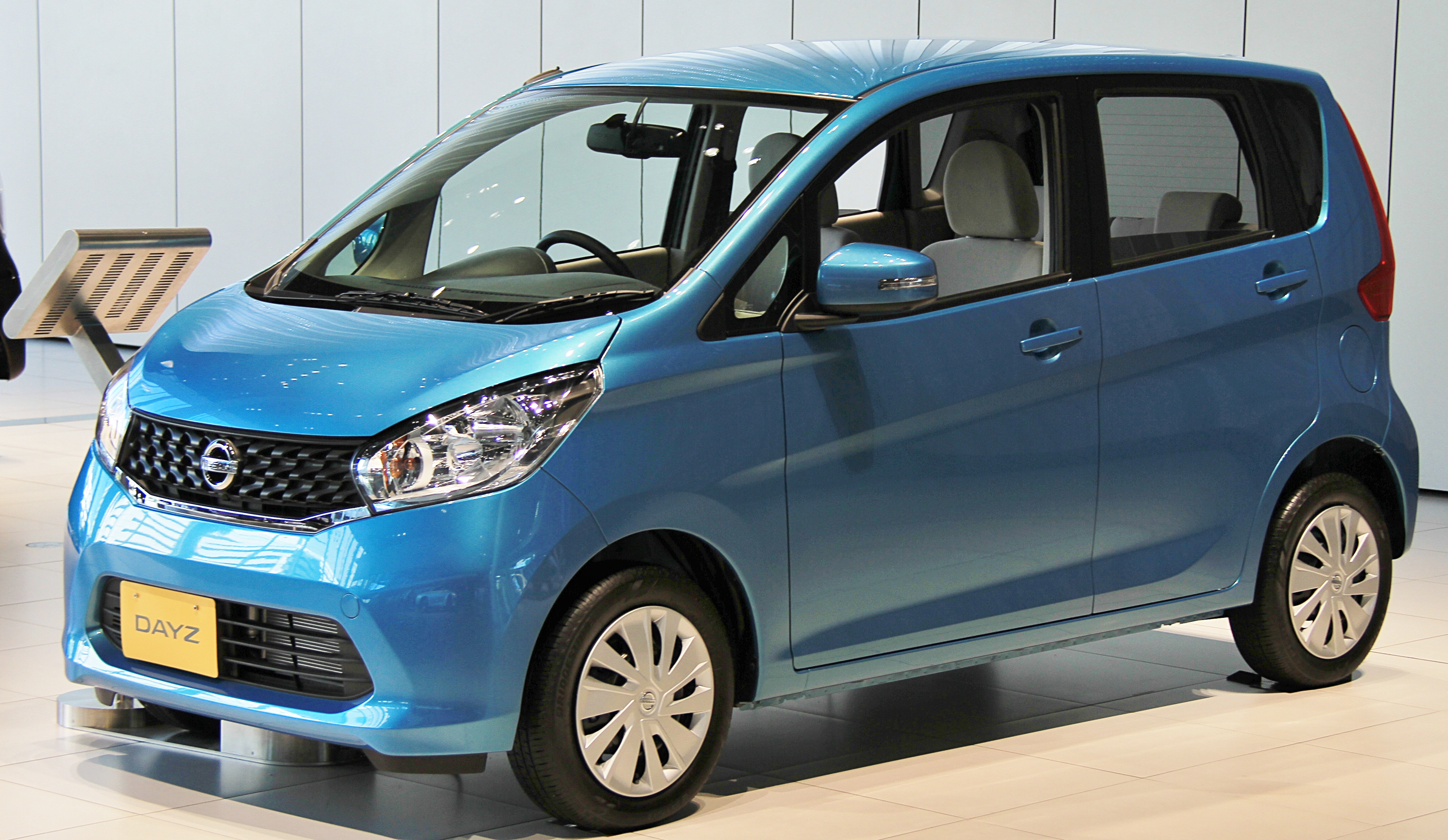
Nissan Dayz

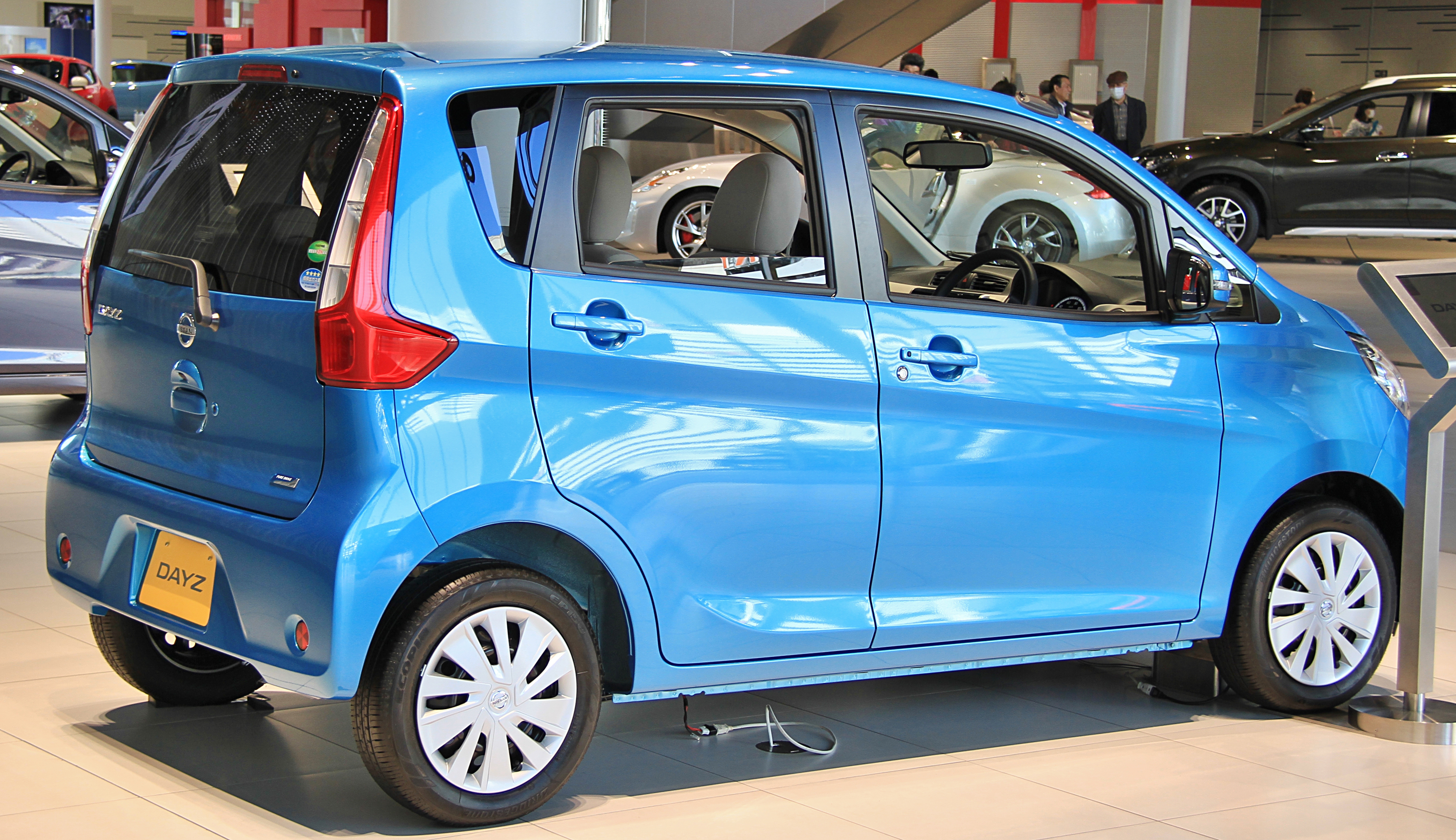
Nissan Dayz rear view

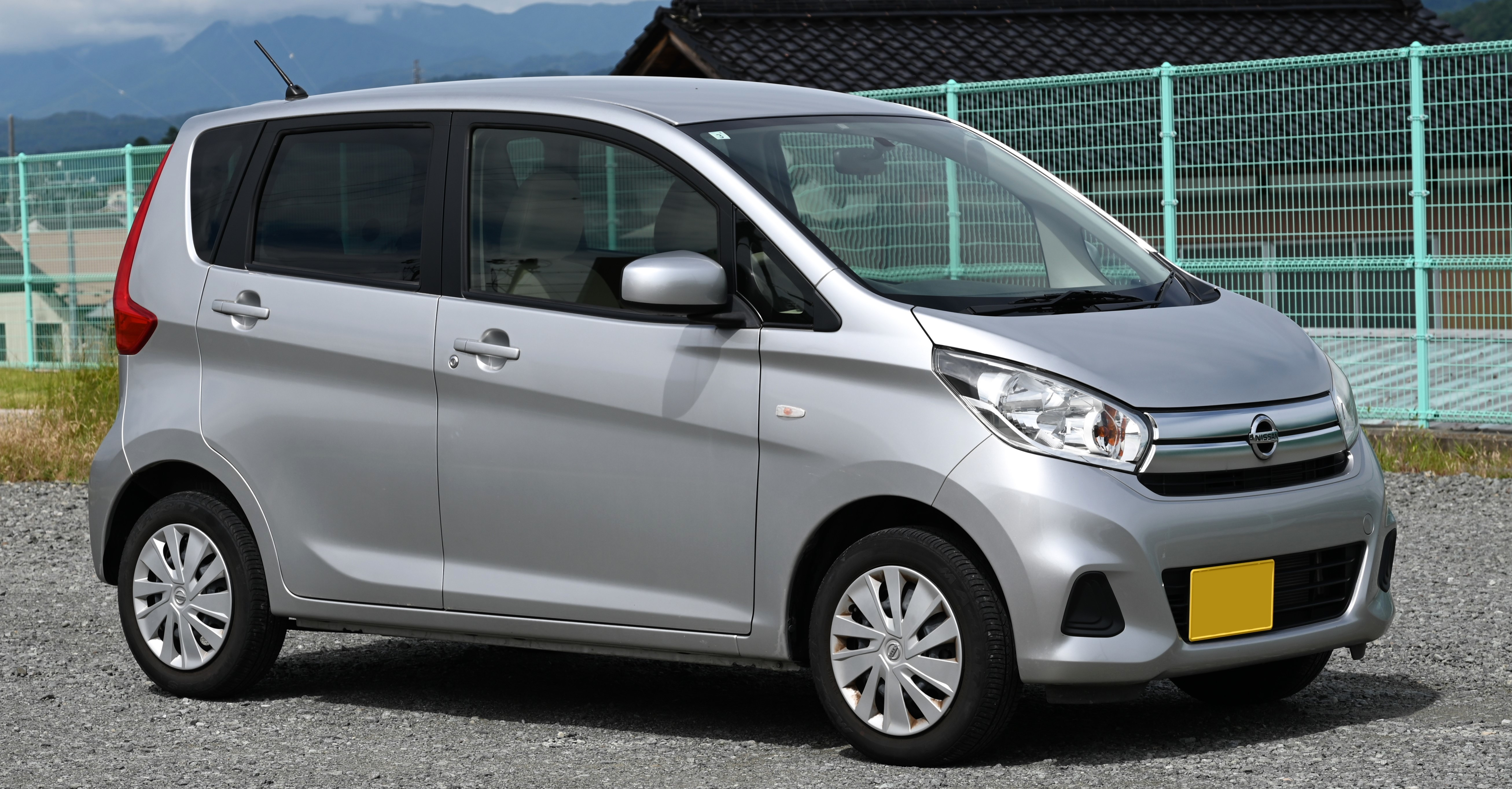
Nissan Dayz (facelift)

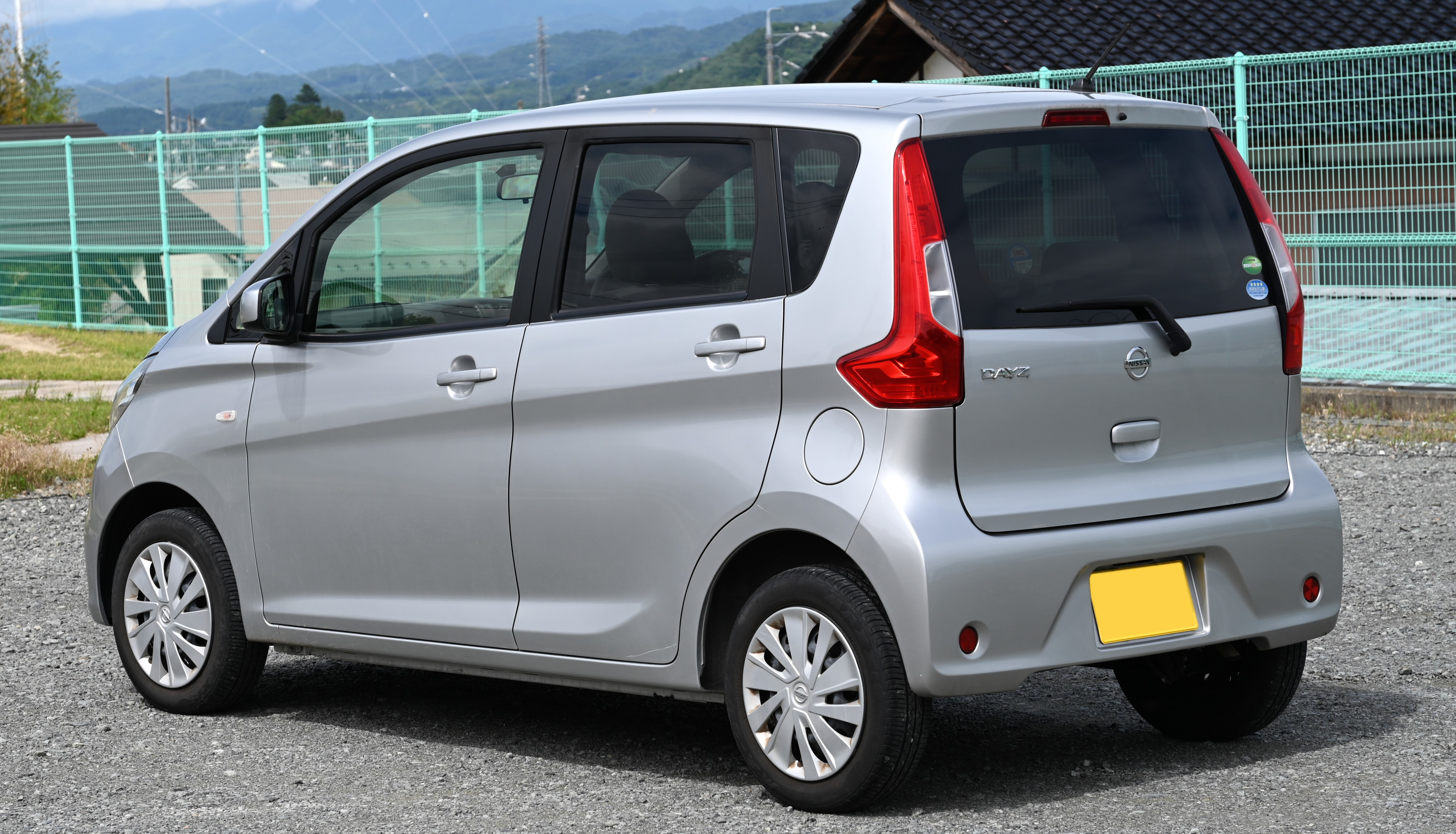
Nissan Dayz rear view (facelift)

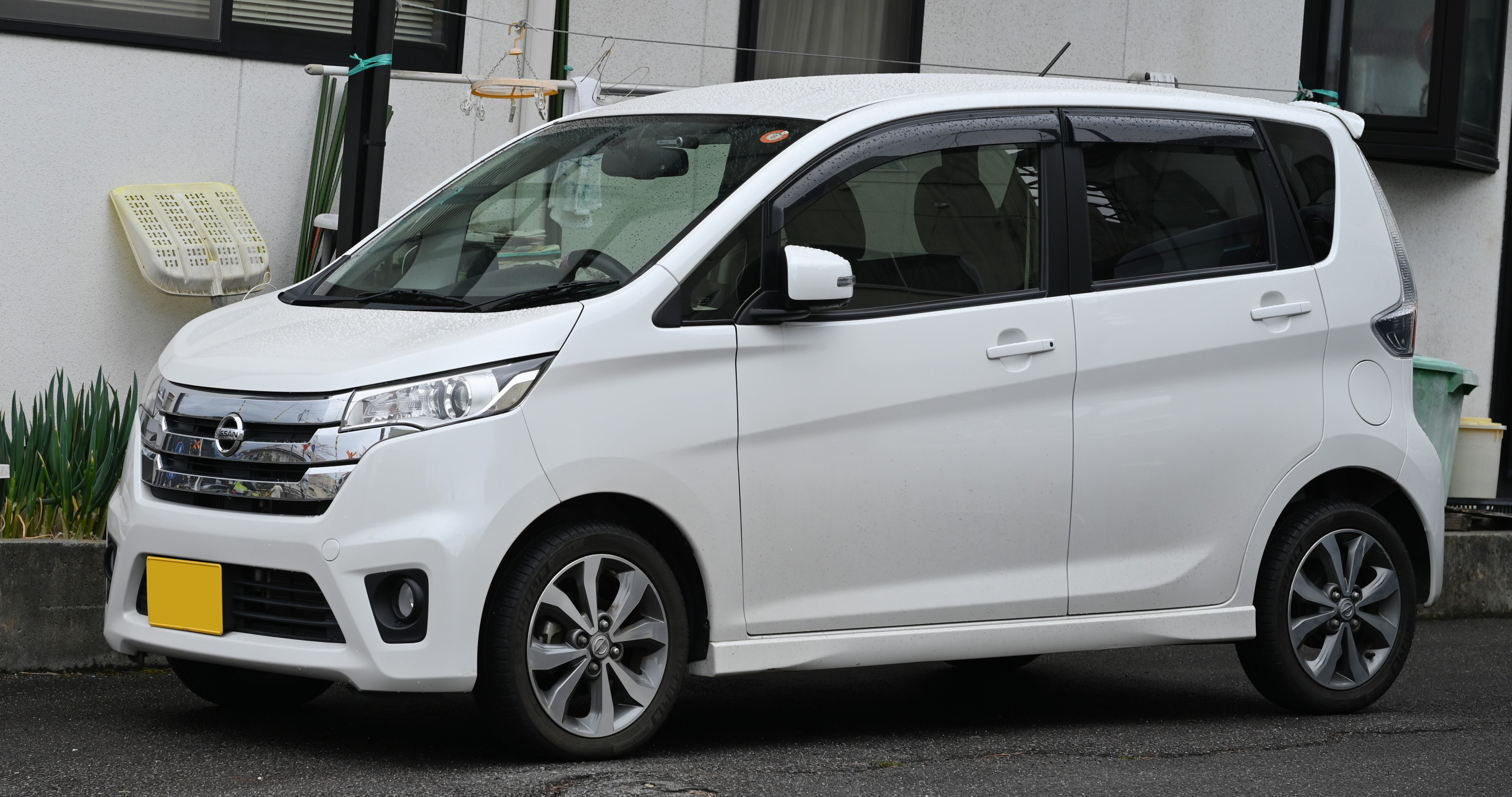
Nissan Dayz Highway Star

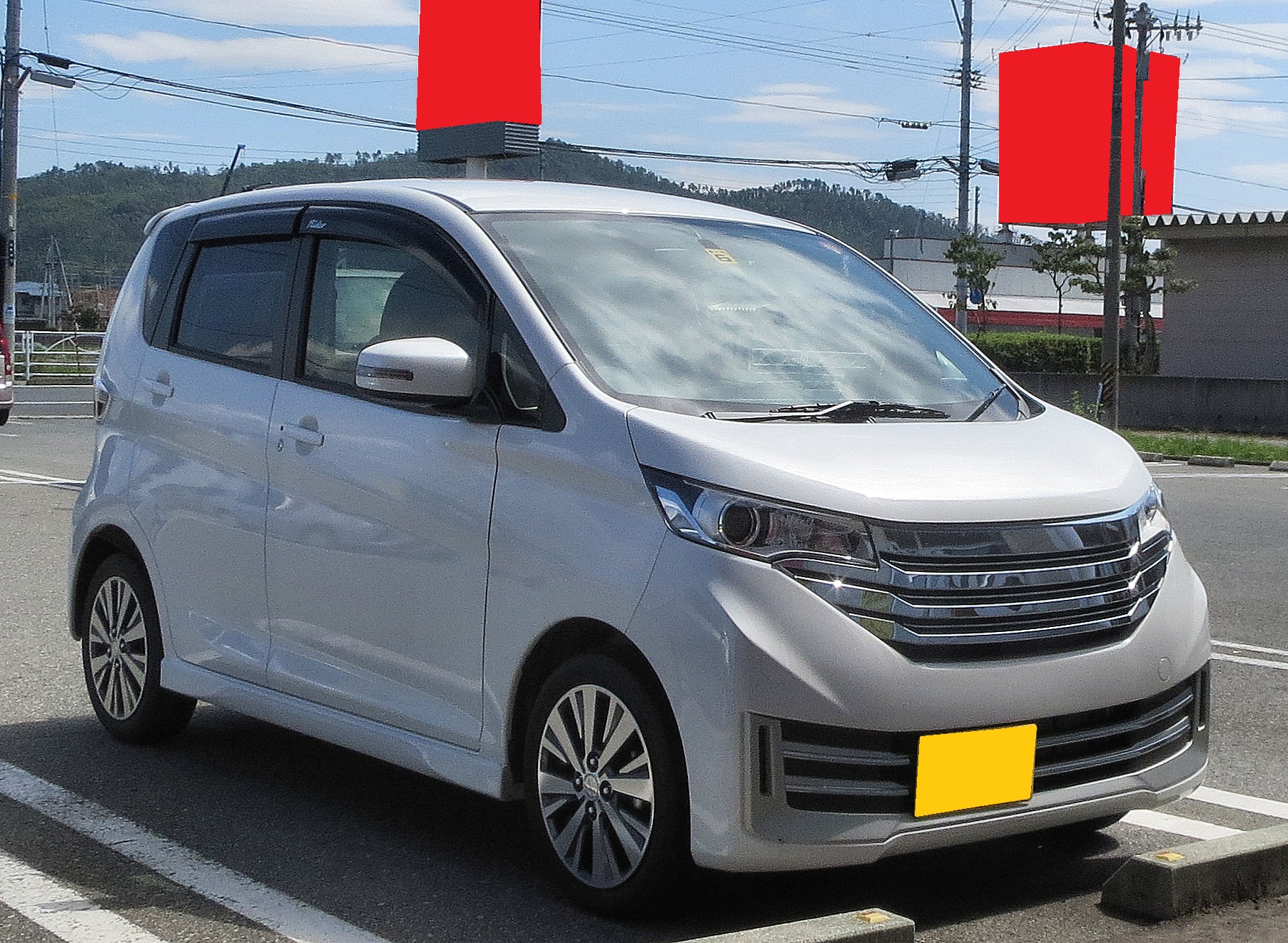
Nissan Dayz Rider

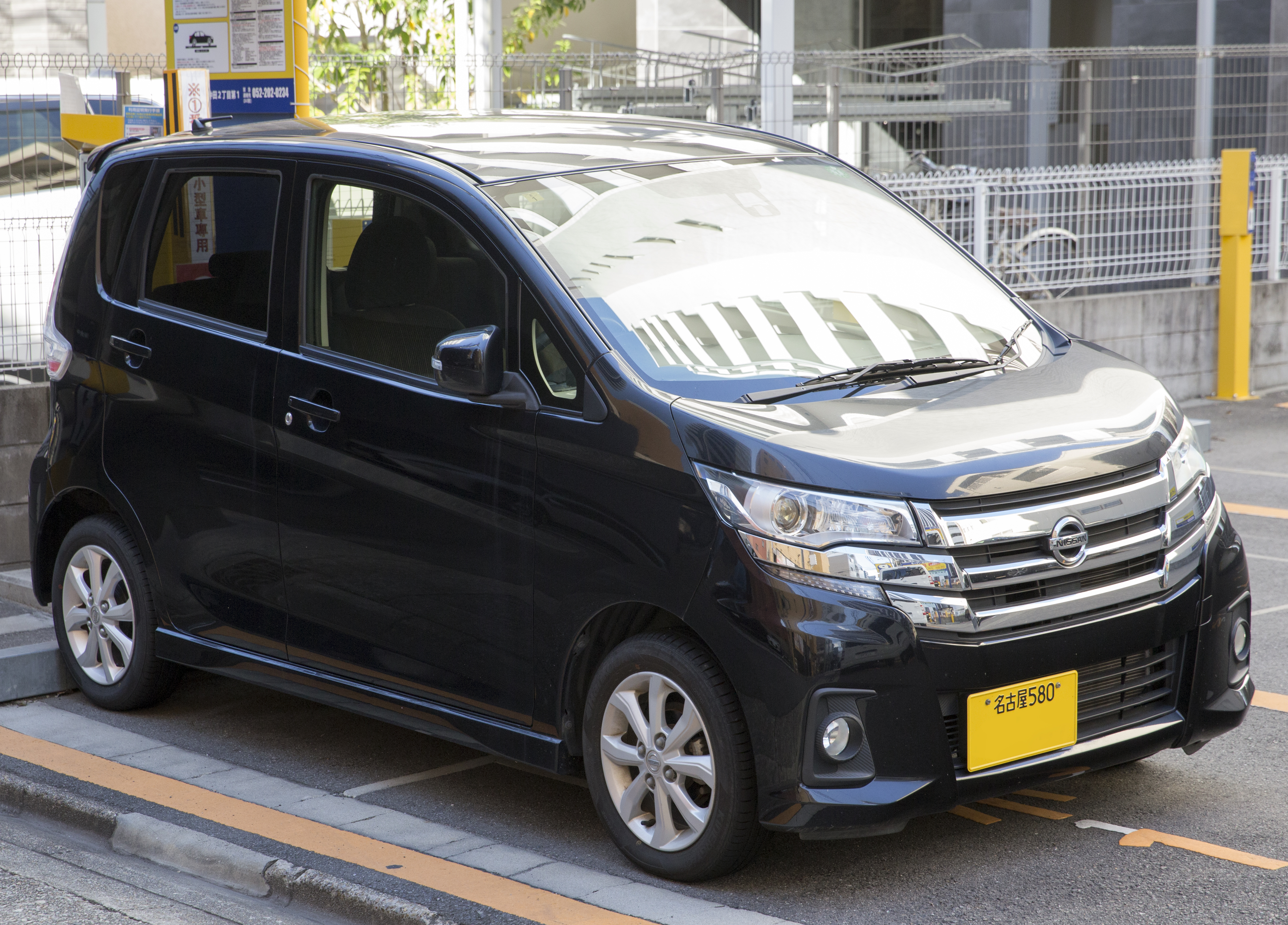
Nissan Dayz Highway Star (facelift)

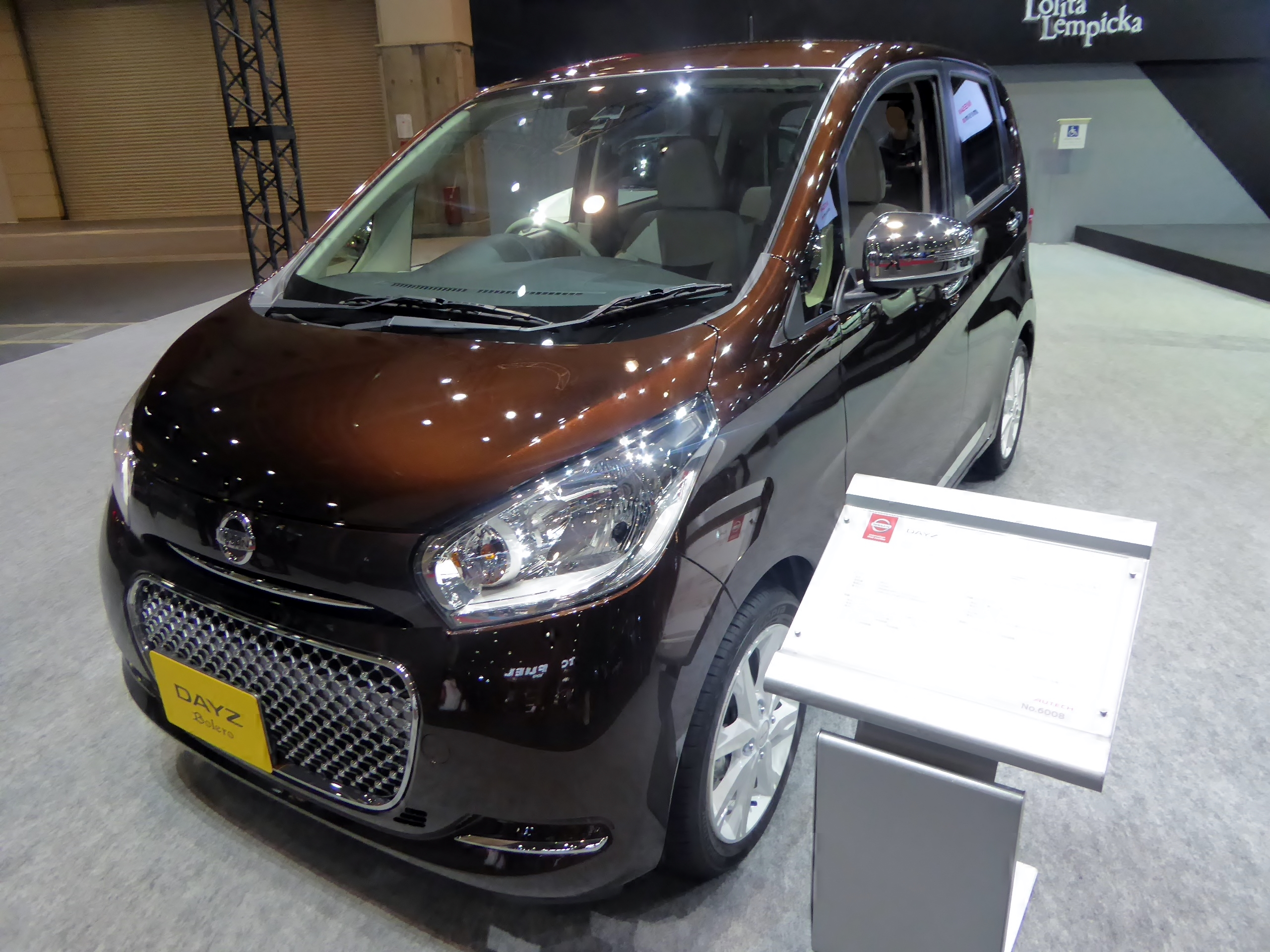
Nissan Dayz Bolero

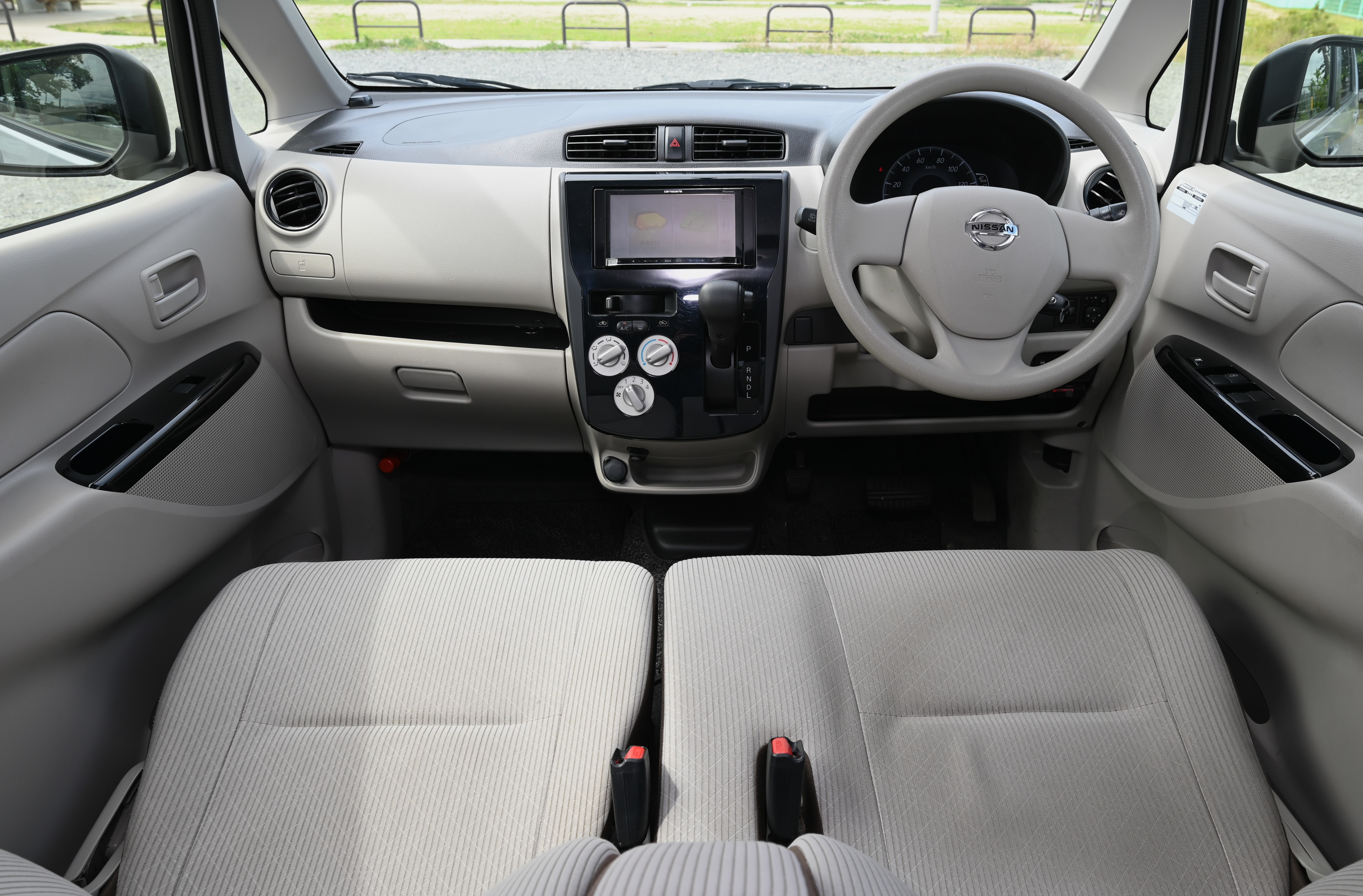
Interior

== Fourth generation (2019) ==
Fourth generation
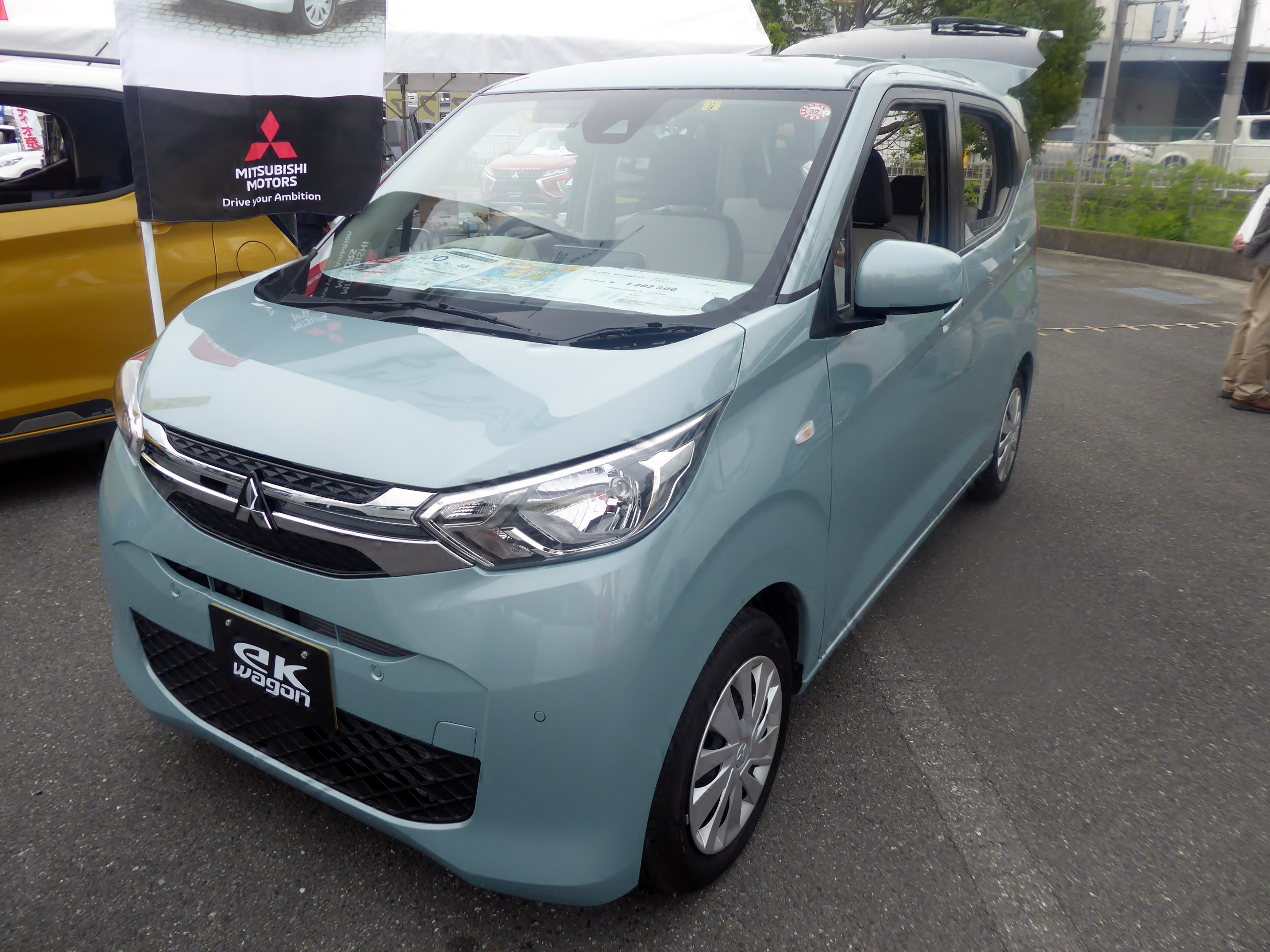

Overview
- Model code: B33; B34; B35; B36; B37; B38; B40; B5A
- Also called: Nissan Dayz
- Production: March 2019 – present

Body and chassis
- Related: Nissan Sakura; Mitsubishi eK Space (second generation)

Powertrain
- Engine: 659 cc BR06D I3 (petrol); 659 cc BR06DET I3-T (petrol)
- Electric motor: SM21 (MHEV; eK X/Dayz Highway Star); MM48 (eK X EV)
- Power output: 38–47 kW (52–64 PS) (ICE models); 47 kW (64 PS) (eK X EV)
- Transmission: CVT
- Battery: 20 kWh lithium-ion (eK X EV)
- Electric range: 180 km (110 mi) (WLTC, eK X EV)

Dimensions
- Wheelbase: 2,495 mm (98.2 in)
- Length: 3,395 mm (133.7 in)
- Width: 1,475 mm (58.1 in)
- Height: 1,640–1,660 mm (64.6–65.4 in)
- Curb weight: 830–940 kg (1,830–2,072 lb) (ICE models); 1,070–1,080 kg (2,359–2,381 lb) (eK X EV)

Chronology
- Predecessor: Mitsubishi Pajero Mini (eK X, indirect); Mitsubishi i-MiEV (eK X EV)

The fourth generation eK Wagon was unveiled on 14 March 2019, and released on 28 March 2019. Both eK and badged-engineered Dayz models are powered by BR06 I3 from most of Mitsubishi/Nissan's kei car range and produces 52 PS (38 kW; 51 bhp) and BR06 turbo produces 64 PS (47 kW), and maximun torque at 58 N⋅m (43 lb⋅ft). Booth models are only available in CVT transmission.

=== eK X ===
A crossover SUV-styled variant, called the Mitsubishi eK X (Japanese: 三菱・eKクロス, Hepburn: Mitsubishi Ē Kei Kurosu) were unveiled on 14 March 2019, and released on 28 March 2019. The eK X using the "Dynamic Shield" design language. It was offered in M, G, T turbo grades. Booth eK Wagon and eK X is the first Mitsubishi Motors vehicle to adopt the highway lane-keeping assist technology; MI-PILOT which is a rebadged version from Nissan's ProPILOT.

The battery electric version of the eK X called the eK X EV was introduced on 20 May 2022, along with its Nissan-badged equivalent called the Nissan Sakura, which received different exterior and interior styling compared to the Dayz.

A facelifted eK X EV was unveiled on 18 June 2026. The changes include a redesigned front fascia, body-coloured grille, and the front grille is now equipped with LED lights.

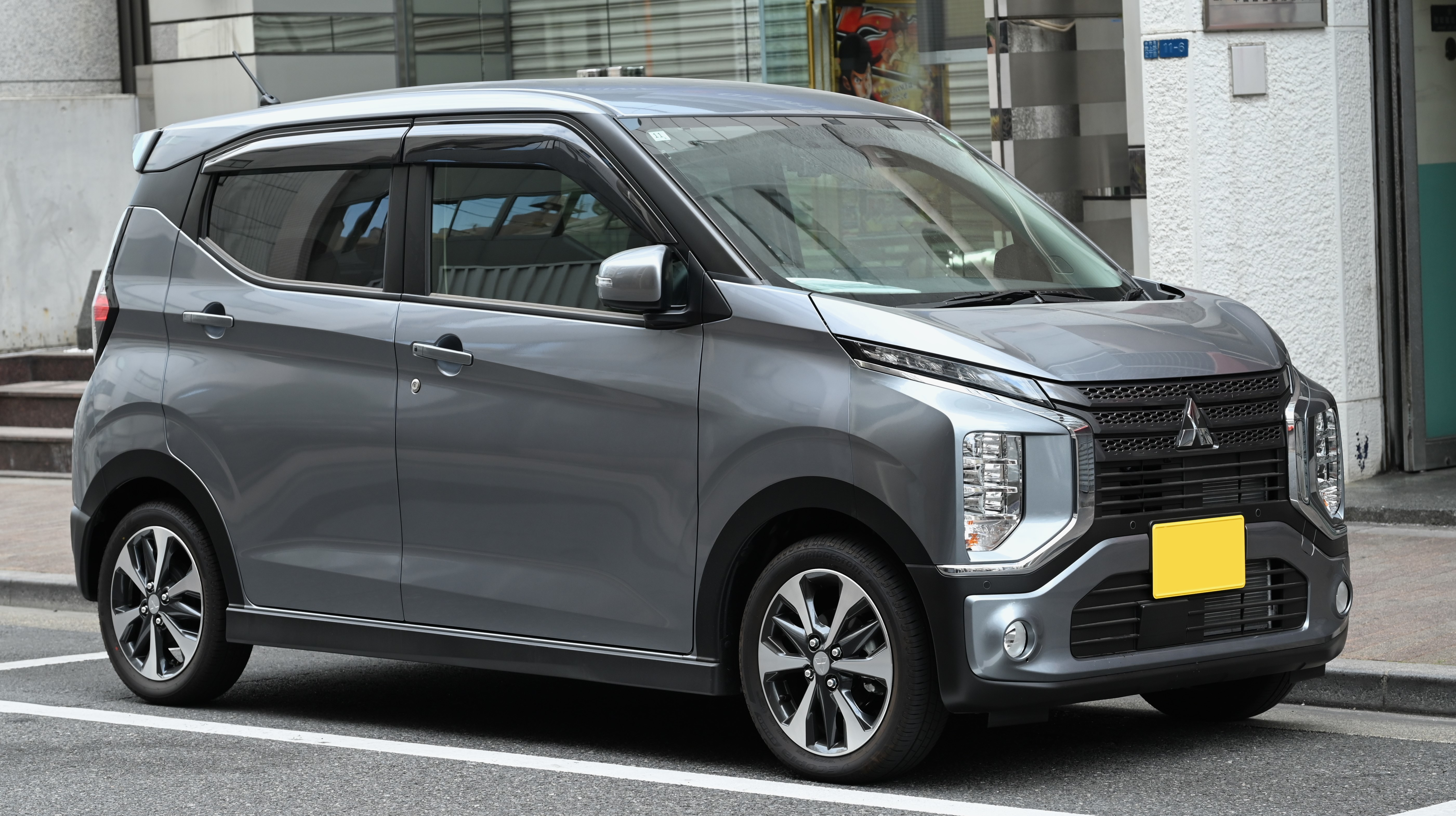
Mitsubishi eK X

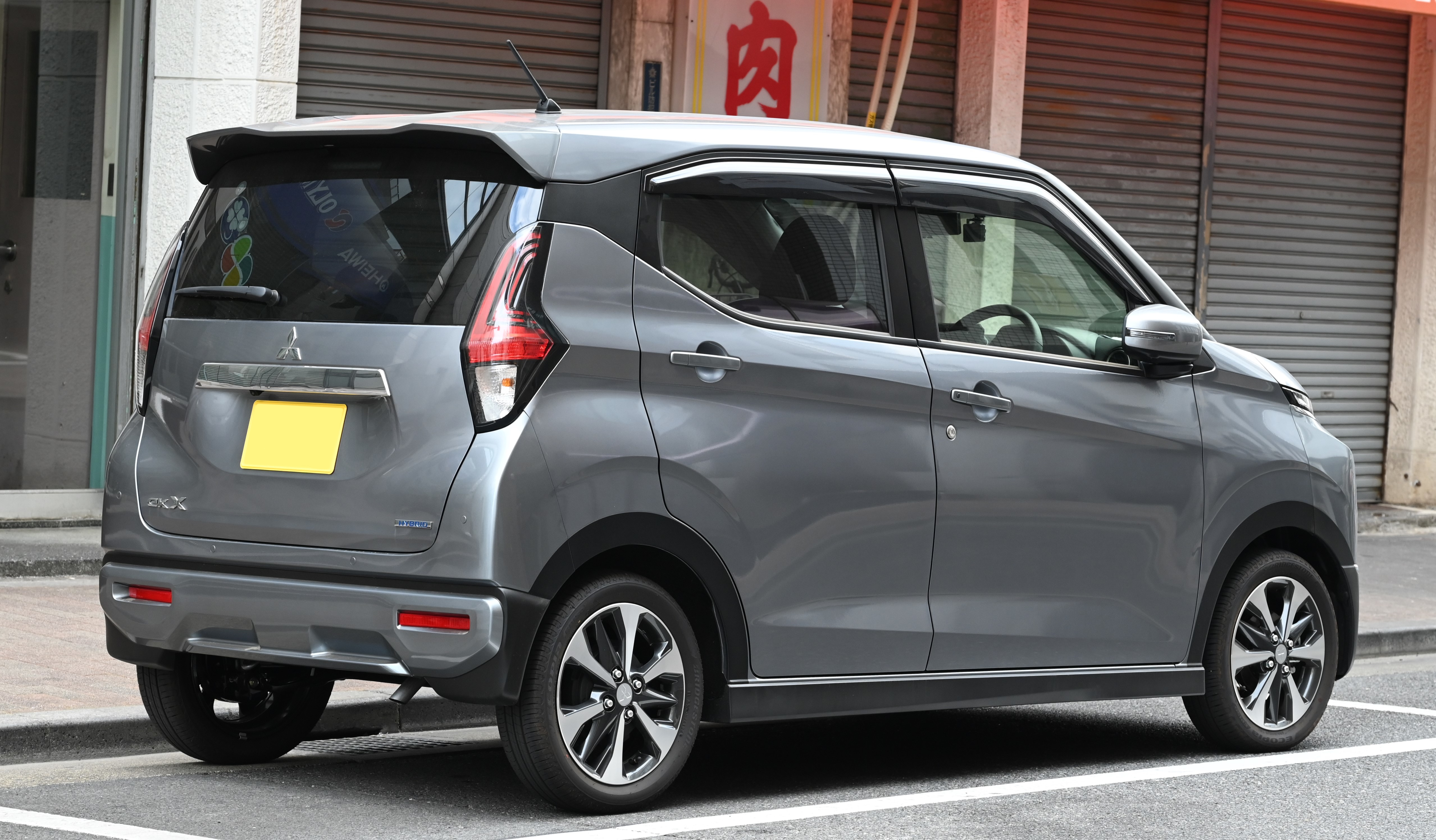
Mitsubishi eK X rear view

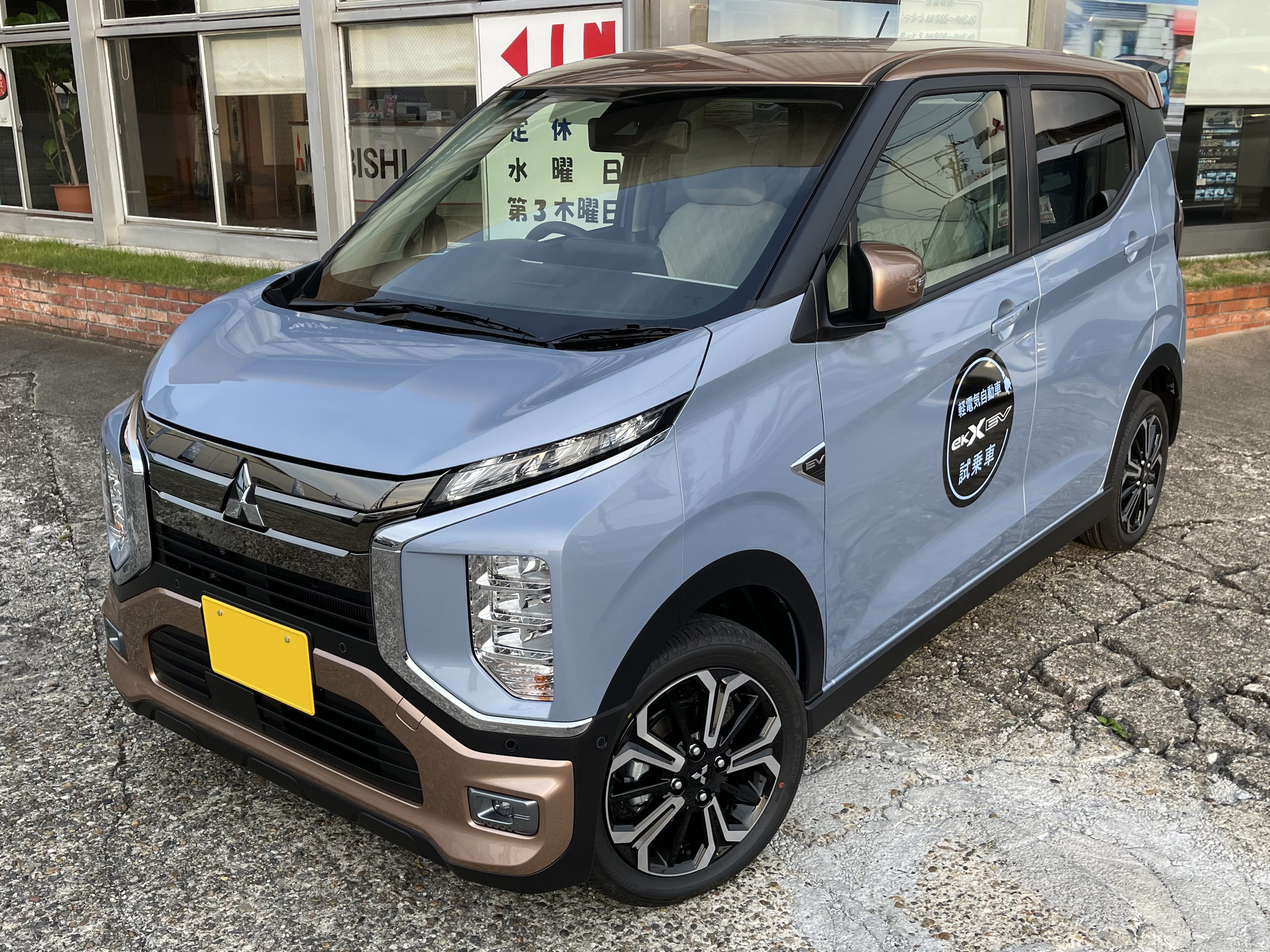
Mitsubishi eK X EV (pre-facelift)

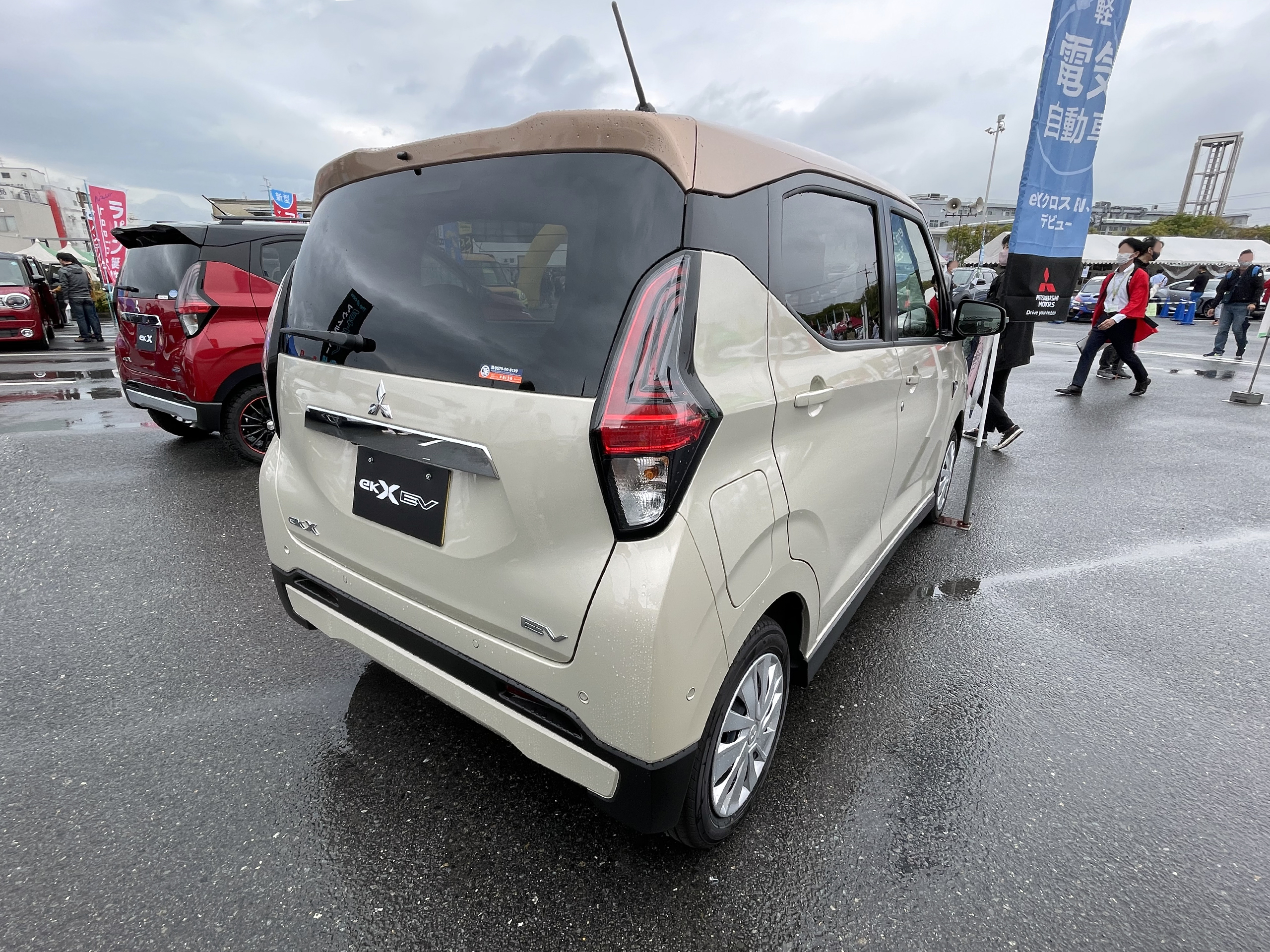
Rear view (pre-facelift)

Mitsubishi eK X EV G (facelift)

Rear view (facelift)

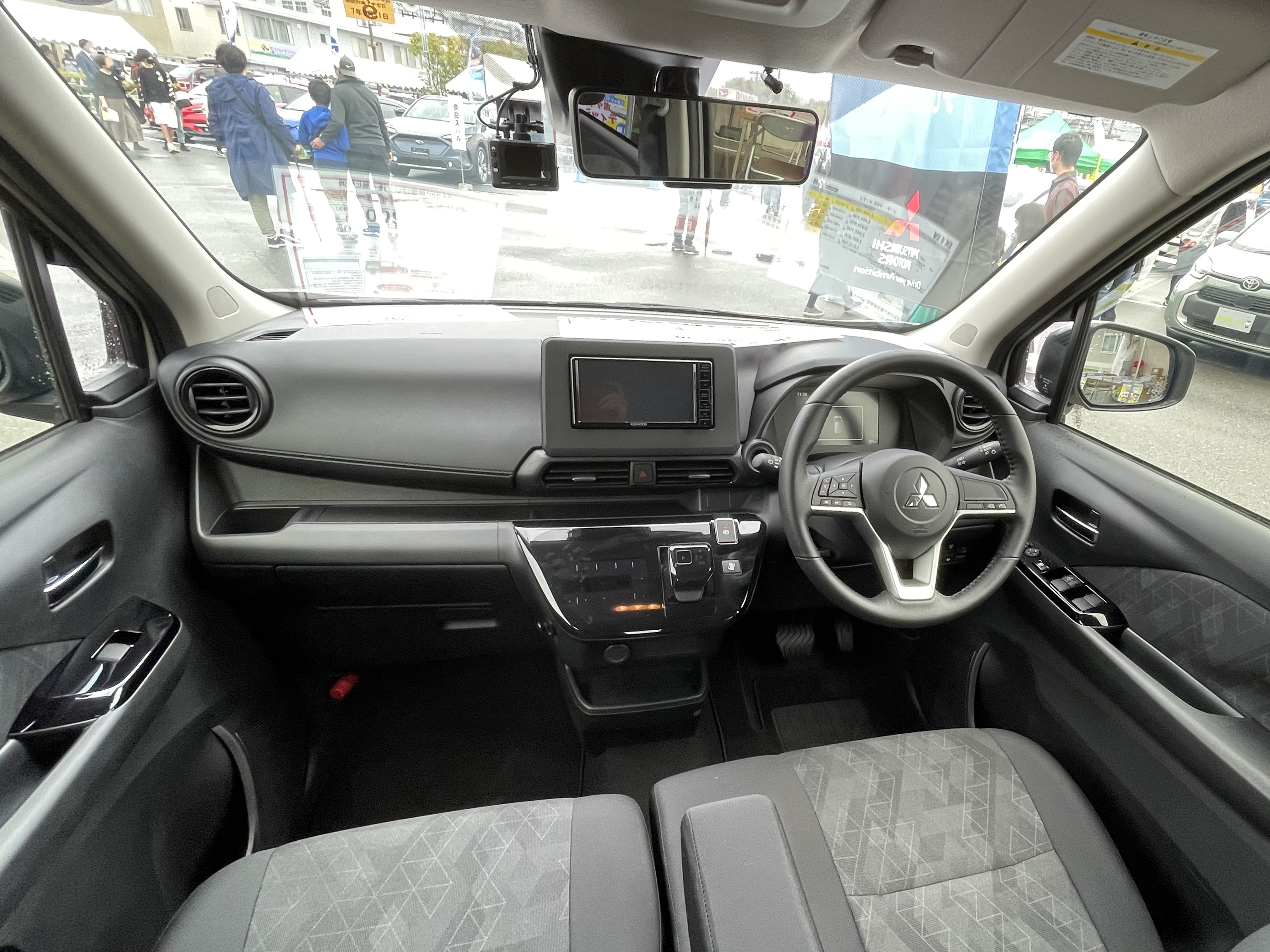
Mitsubishi eK X EV interior

=== Nissan Dayz (B40) ===
The second-generation Dayz was launched in 19 March 2019 along with eK Wagon. It was offered in standard S, and X grades, while the Highway Star was offered in X and G grades. A retro-styled Bolero which was produced by Autech also available. This is Nissan's first kei car with ProPILOT lane-keeping assist technology.

The two-model lineup, the regular model and the higher Highway Star models was retained from the first generation. Feature a V-Motion front grille. The "Highway Star" features LED headlights, and the larger V-Motion with 3D mesh grille.

A facelift occurred in September 2023. The regular model received a redesigned front grille, while the Highway Star grade received a completely redesign front fascia. Two-tone colour option were available in booth regular and Highway Star models.

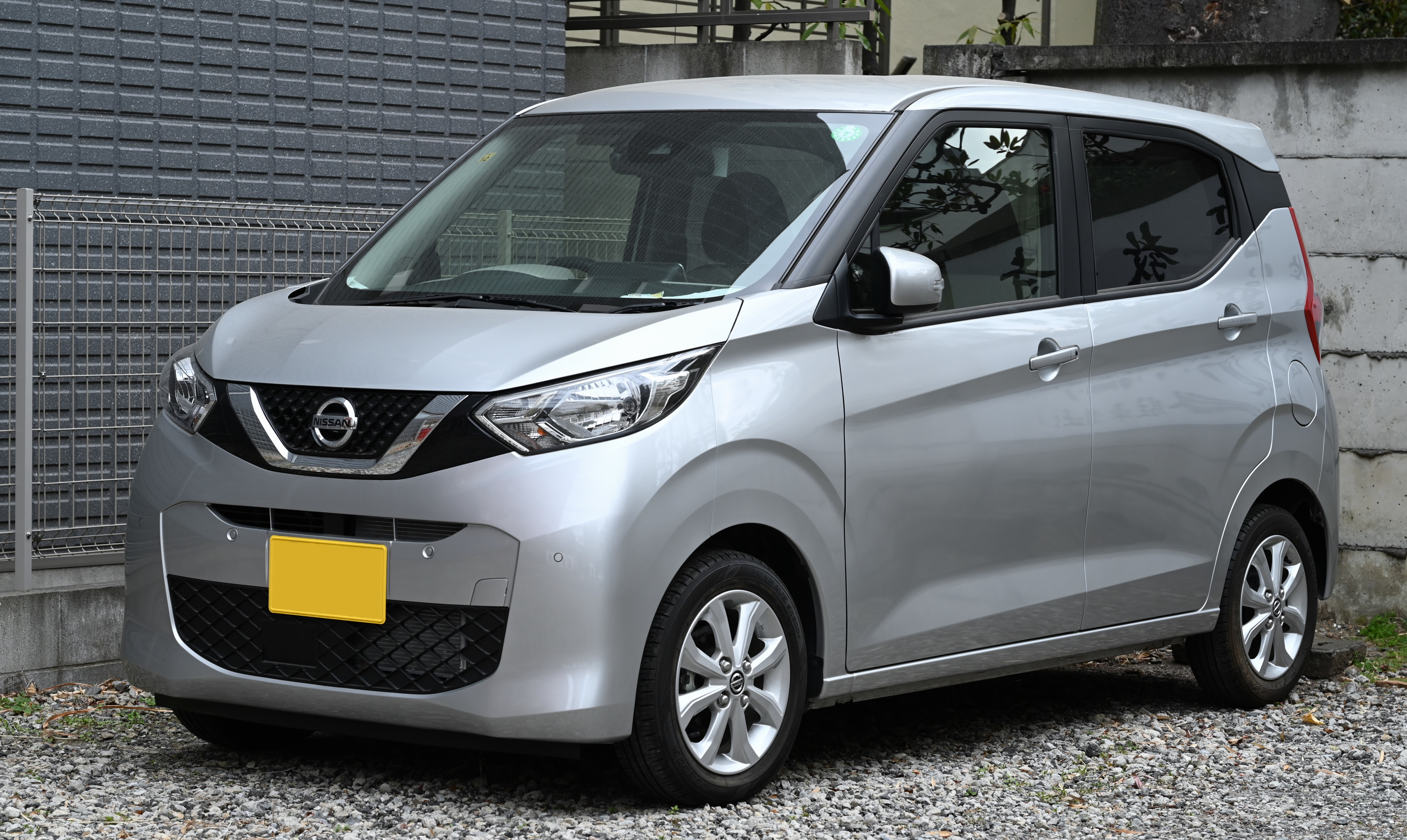
Nissan Dayz (pre-facelift)

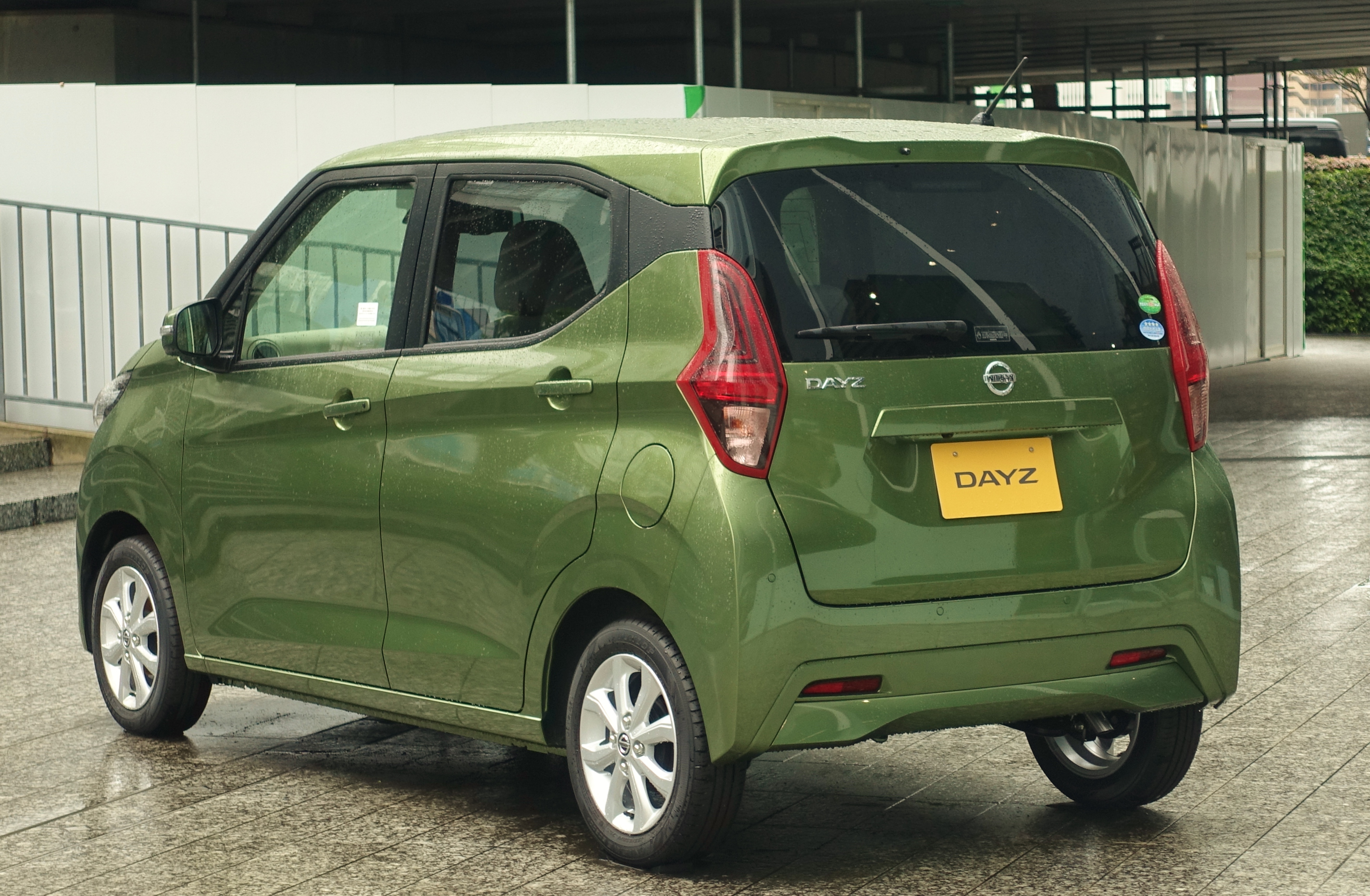
Nissan Dayz (pre-facelift)

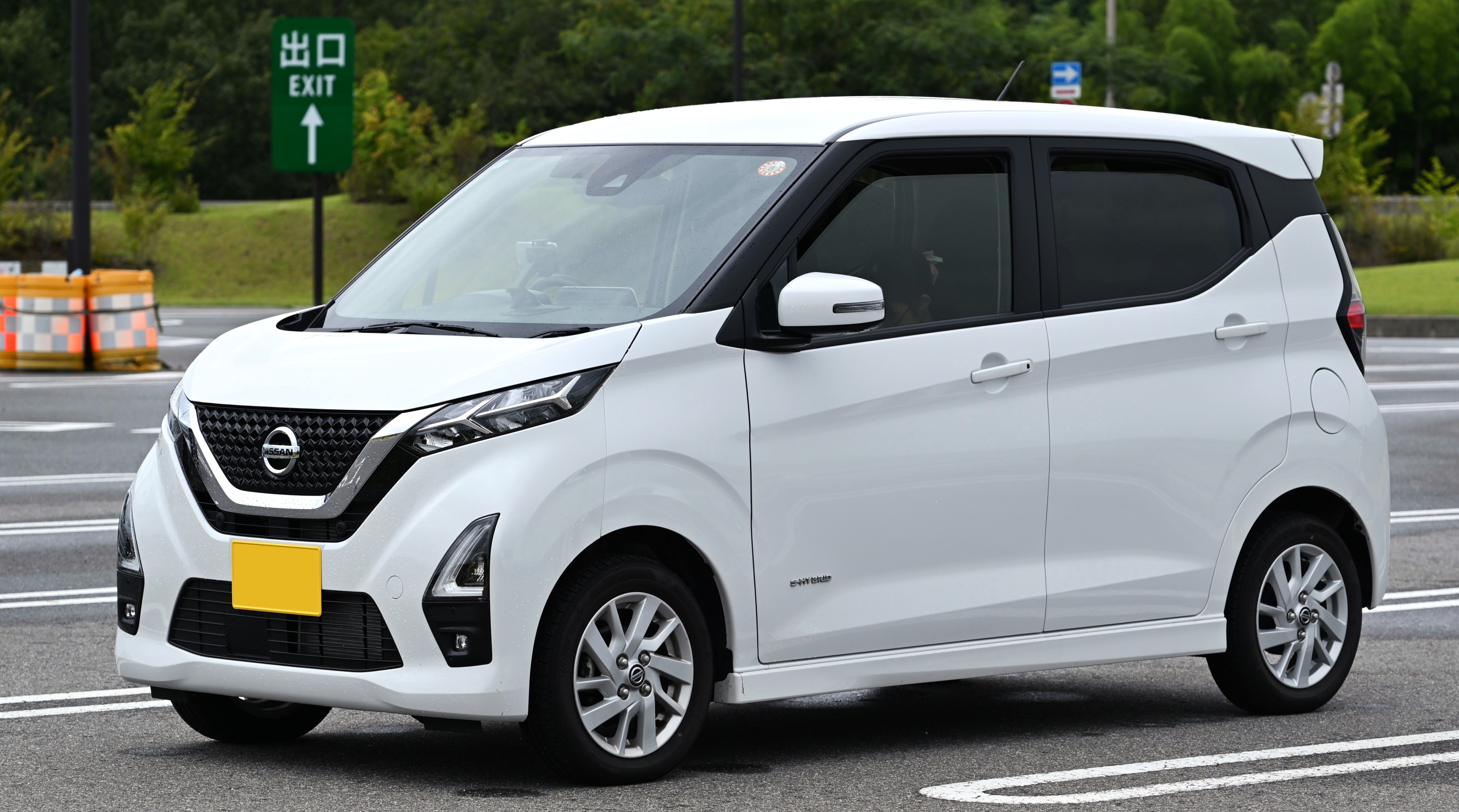
Nissan Dayz Highway Star (pre-facelift)

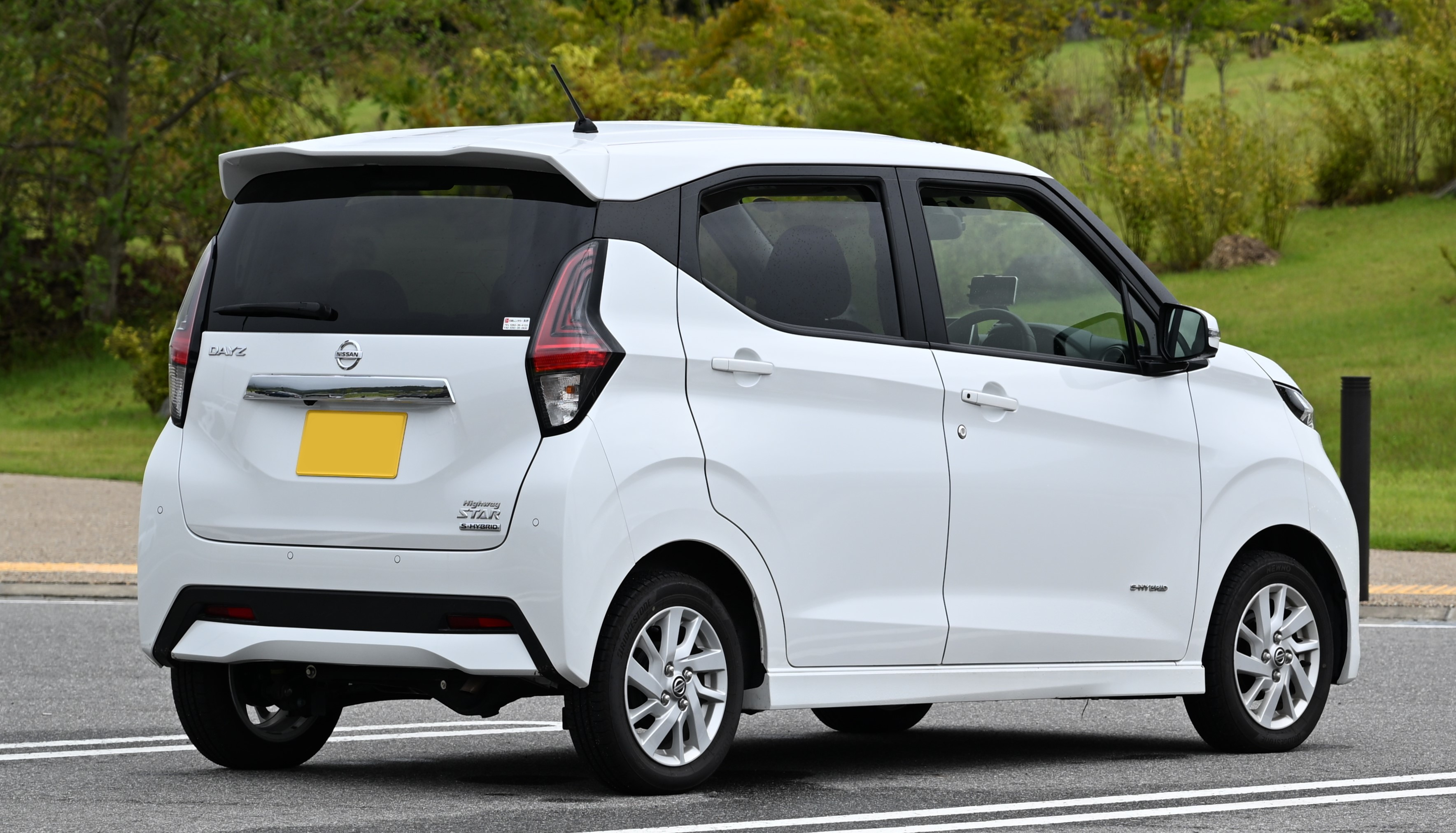
Nissan Dayz Highway Star (pre-facelift)

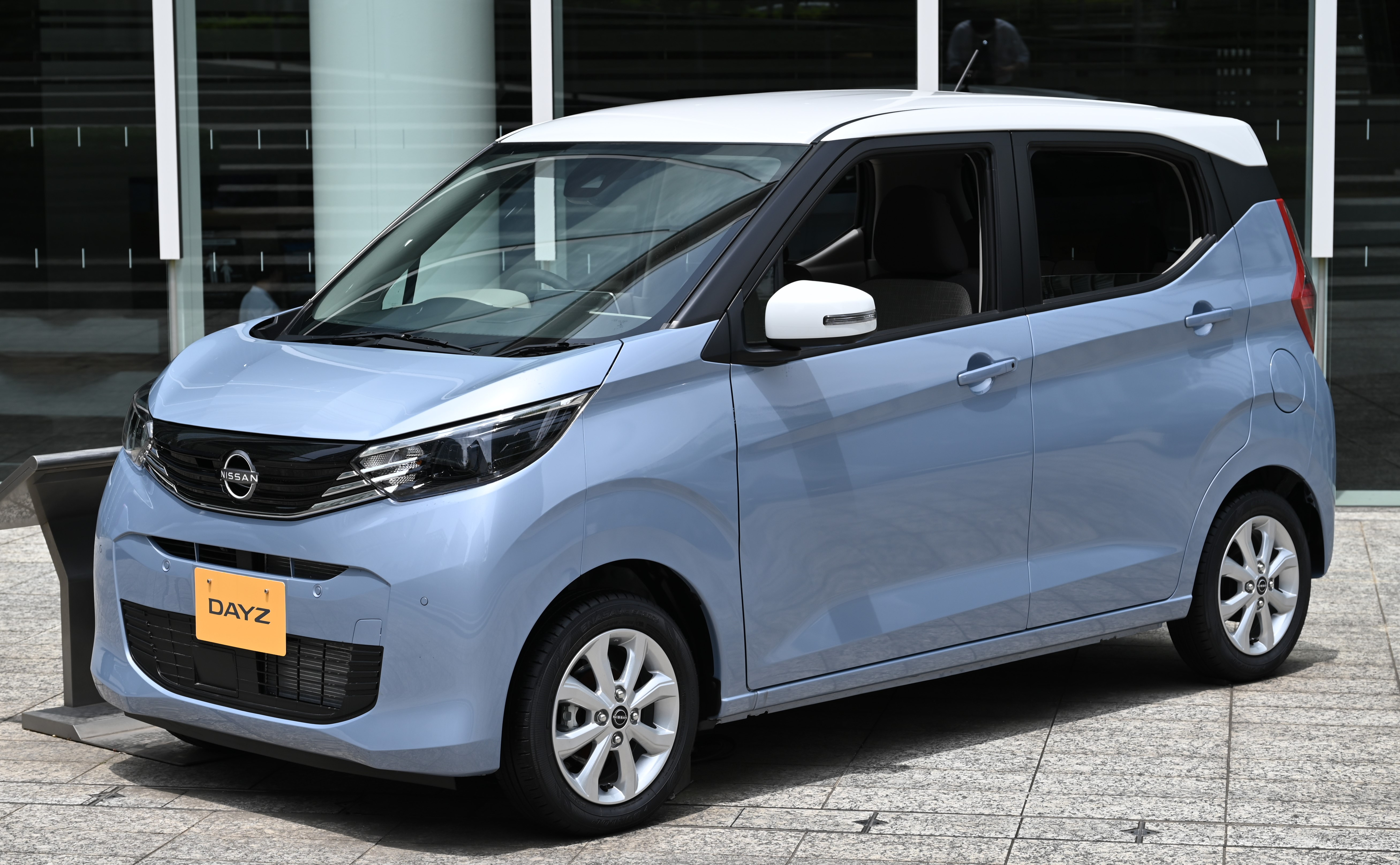
Nissan Dayz X (facelift)

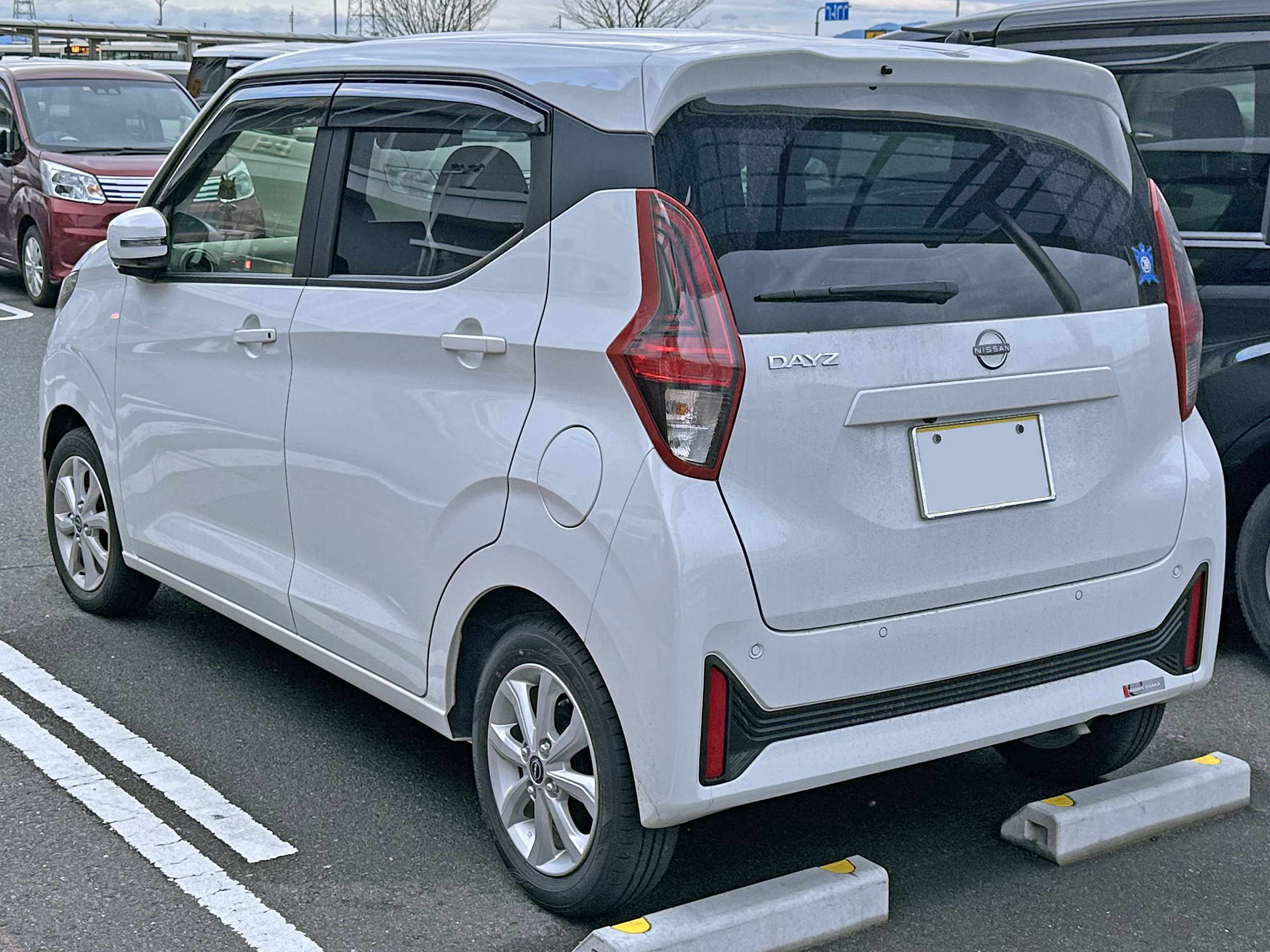
Nissan Dayz (facelift)

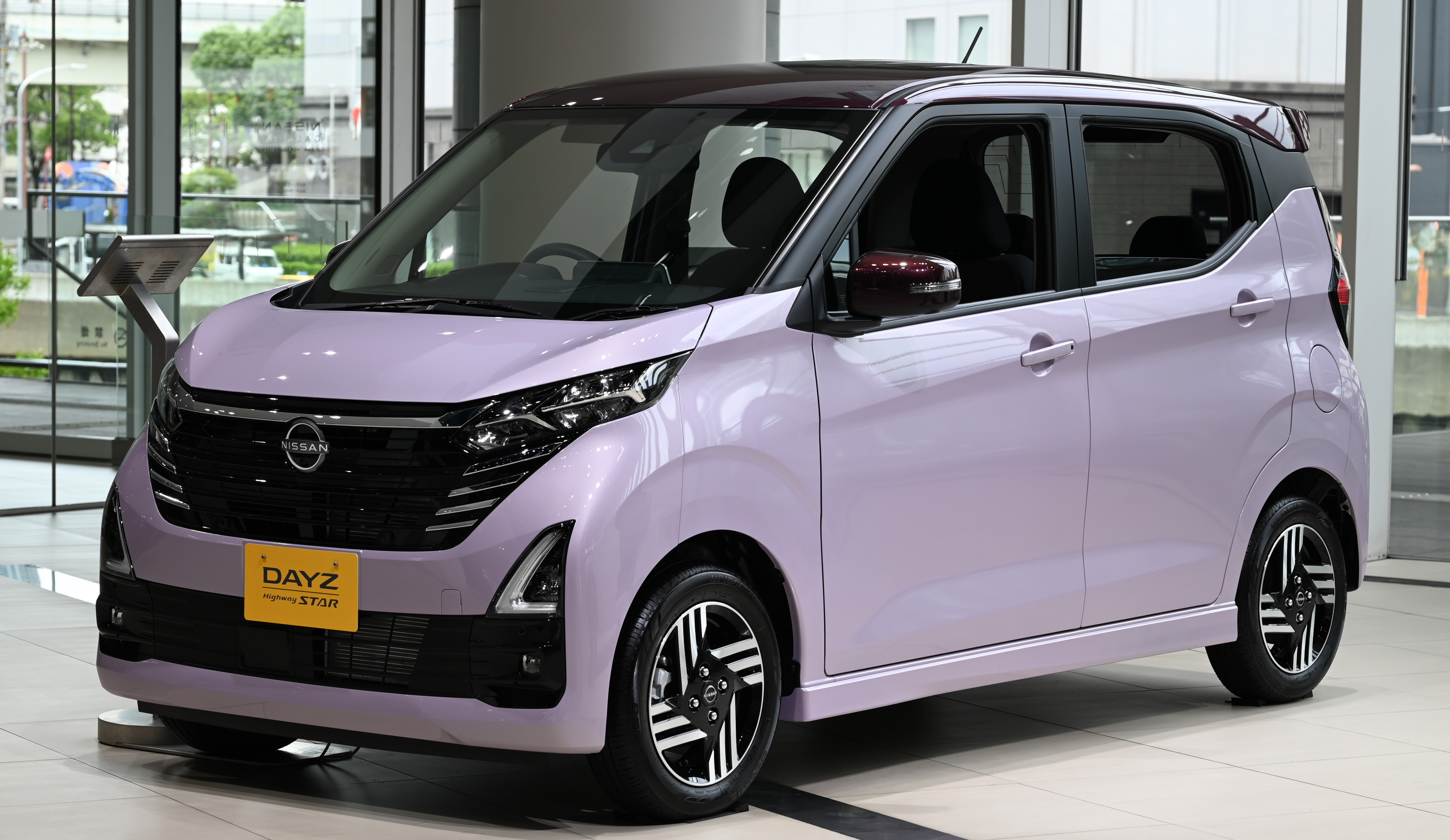
Nissan Dayz Highway Star X (facelift)

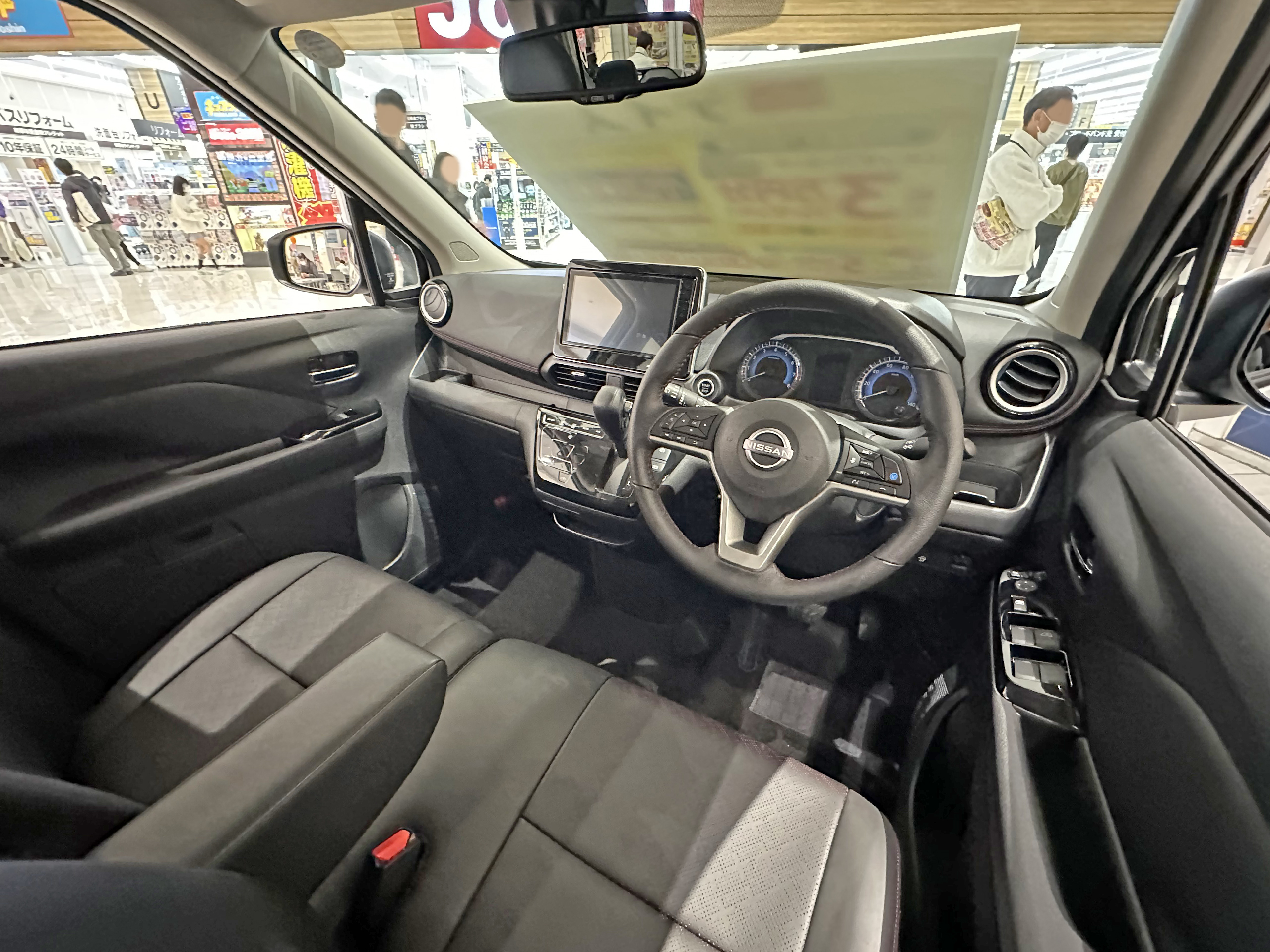
Interior

== Annual production and sales ==
Production figures include OEM units manufactured on behalf of Nissan, while sales figures only include Mitsubishi-badged models.

| Year | Production | Sales |
|---|---|---|
| 2001 | 97,390 | 86,465 |
| 2002 | 115,918 | 122,857 |
| 2003 | 119,652 | 118,567 |
| 2004 | 70,826 | 71,062 |
| 2005 | 118,480 | 73,277 |
| 2006 | 122,294 | 67,052 |
| 2007 | 77,875 | 56,686 |
| 2008 | 63,943 | 39,972 |

(sources: Facts & Figures 2005, Facts & Figures 2009, Mitsubishi Motors website)

=== Sales ===
| Year | Japan | |
| Year | Nissan Dayz | Mitsubishi eK X EV |
|---|---|---|
| 2013 | 78,846 | |
| 2014 | 88,186 | |
| 2015 | 71,558 | |
| 2016 | 51,329 | |
| 2017 | 63,969 | |
| 2018 | 63,883 | |
| 2019 | 89,371 (Note: 18,663 of the third generation (AA0) and 70,708 of the fourth generation (B5A).) | |
| 2020 | 71,934 | |
| 2021 | 53,773 | |
| 2022 | 43,864 | 4,175 |
| 2023 | 38,687 | 7,021 |
| 2024 | 50,432 | 2,504 |
