= Mitsubishi eK Space =

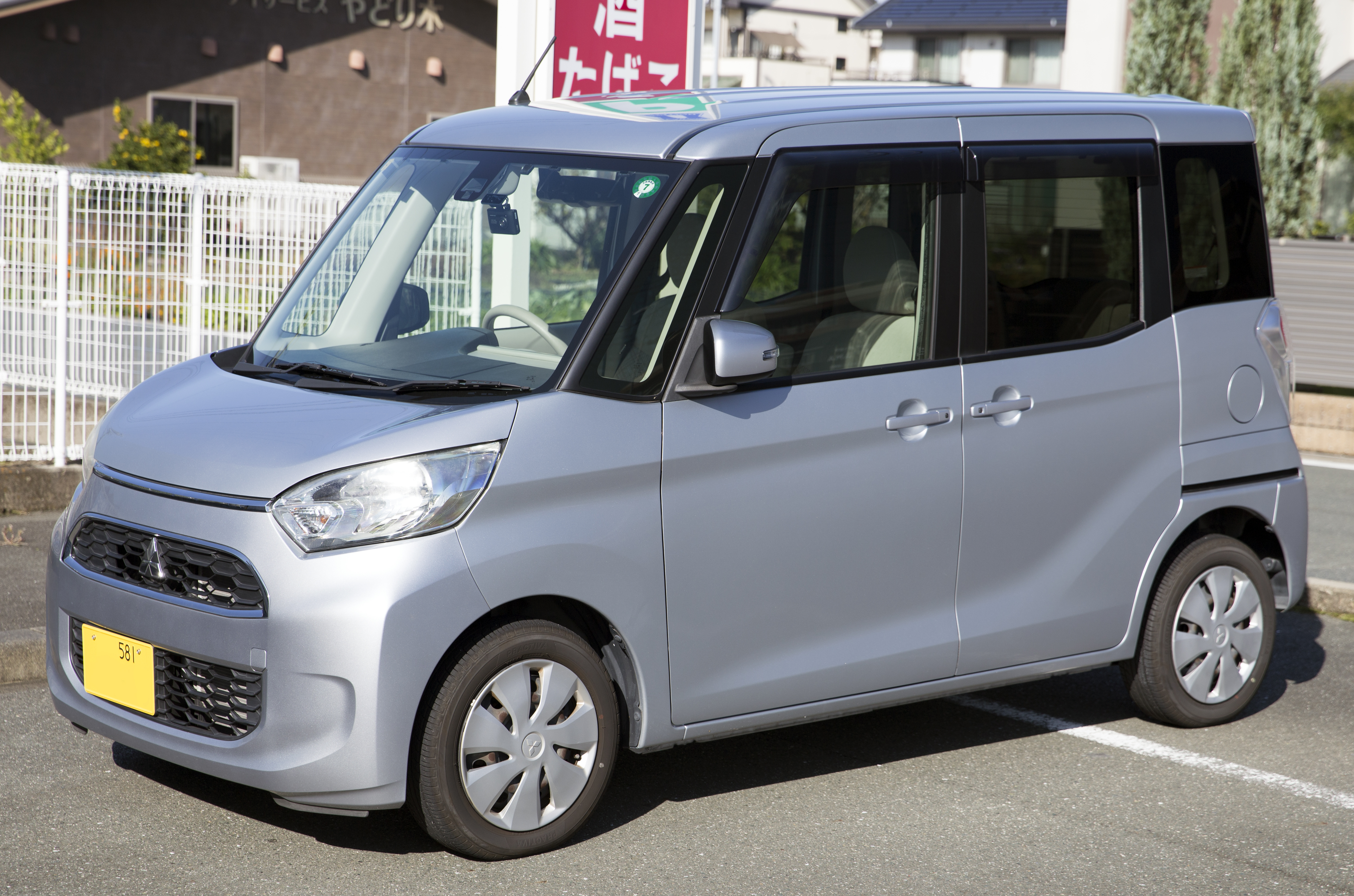
- Mitsubishi eK Space (facelift first generation)

Overview
- Manufacturer: NMKV
- Also called: Nissan Dayz Roox (2014–2020); Nissan Roox (2020–present)
- Production: February 2014 – present
- Assembly: Japan: Kurashiki, Okayama (Mizushima plant)

Body and chassis
- Class: Kei car
- Body style: 5-door minivan
- Layout: Front-engine, front-wheel-drive; Front-engine, four-wheel-drive
- Related: Mitsubishi Delica Mini; Mitsubishi eK

Chronology
- Predecessor: Mitsubishi Toppo (H82A); Nissan Roox (ML21S/VA0)

The Mitsubishi eK Space is a tall-height wagon kei car with rear sliding doors, based on the Mitsubishi eK. The eK Space is also sold by Nissan as the Nissan Dayz Roox from 2014 to 2020 and as the Nissan Roox from 2020; the Roox name had earlier been used on a rebadged Suzuki Palette.

== First generation (2014) ==
First generation
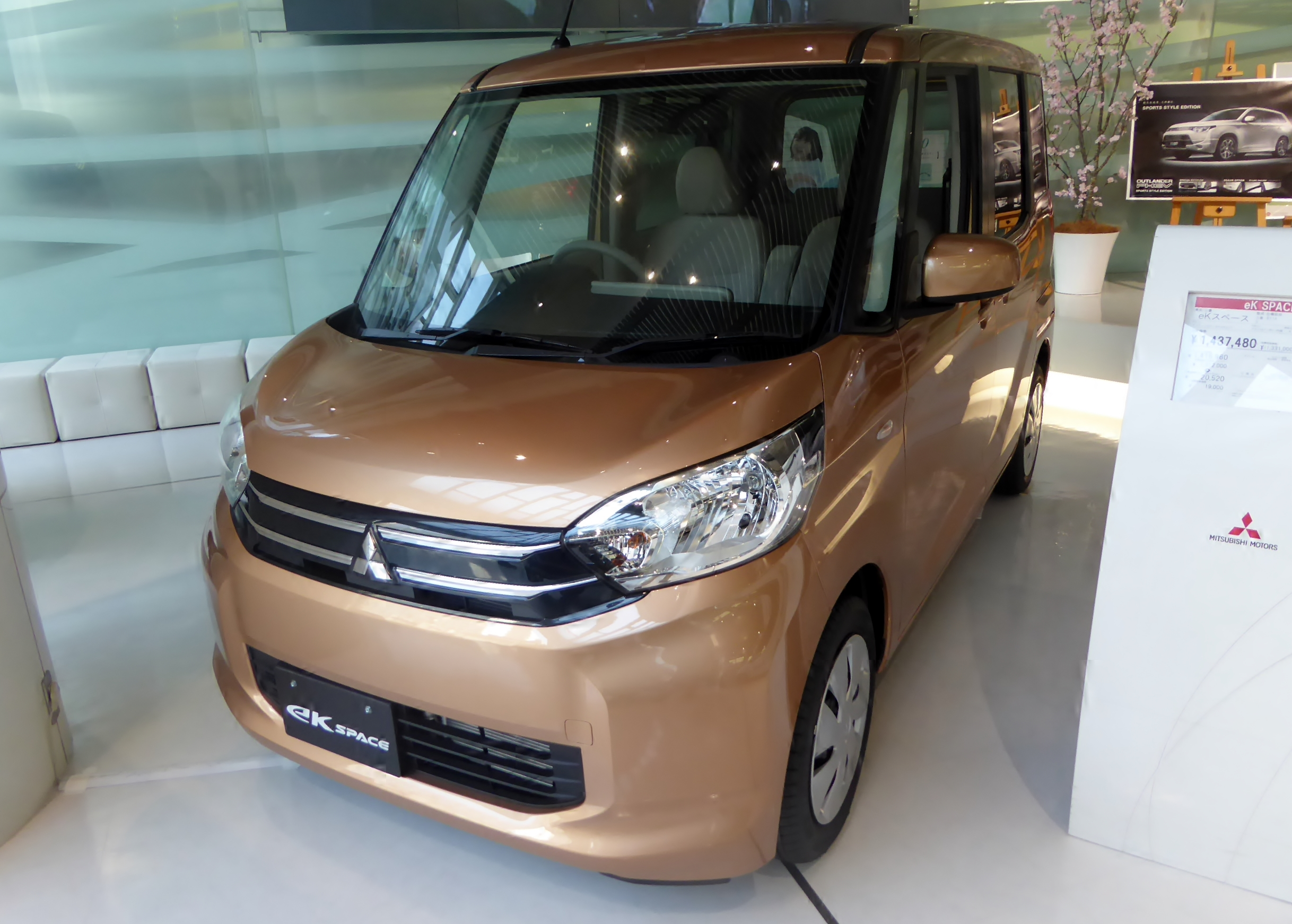

Overview
- Model code: B11; B21; BA0
- Also called: Nissan Dayz Roox
- Production: February 2014 – March 2020

Body and chassis
- Related: Mitsubishi eK (third generation)

Powertrain
- Engine: Petrol: 658 cc 3B20 I3; 658 cc 3B20T turbo I3
- Transmission: CVT

Dimensions
- Wheelbase: 2,430 mm (95.7 in)
- Length: 3,395 mm (133.7 in)
- Width: 1,475 mm (58.1 in)
- Height: 1,775 mm (69.9 in)
- Curb weight: 920–1,000 kg (2,028–2,205 lb)

The first generation eK Space and its sportier variant, called the eK Space Custom, were announced on October 3, 2013, and released on February 13, 2014. The eK Space Custom, with its large chrome grille, was facelifted in December 2016 along with the regular eK Space. The new Custom version features an even larger "Dynamic Shield" grille similar to the one introduced on the Outlander in 2015. The standard eK Space had the original, full-width grille replaced with a two-tiered opening surrounded by sheetmetal.

Mitsubishi eK Space

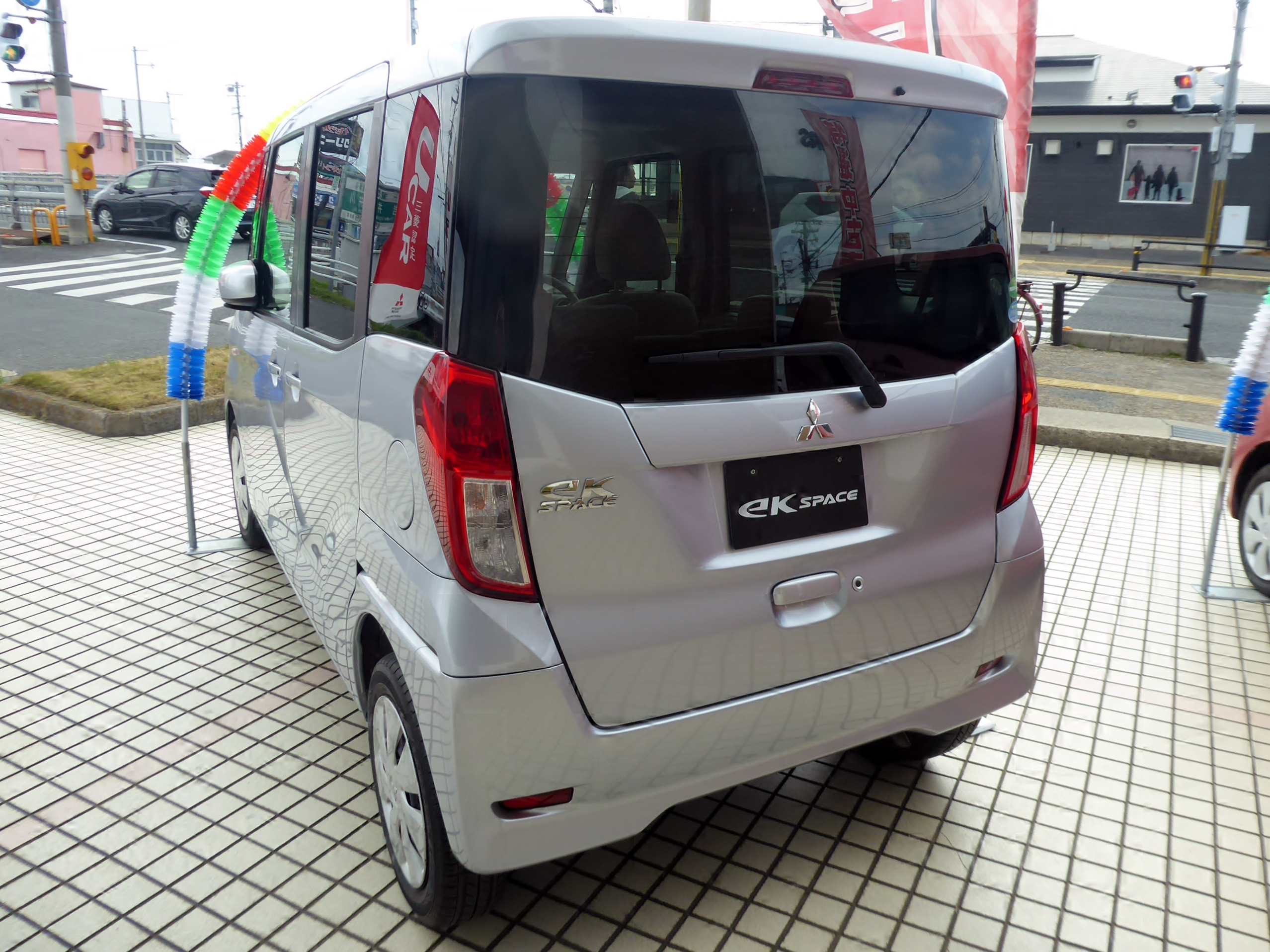
Rear view

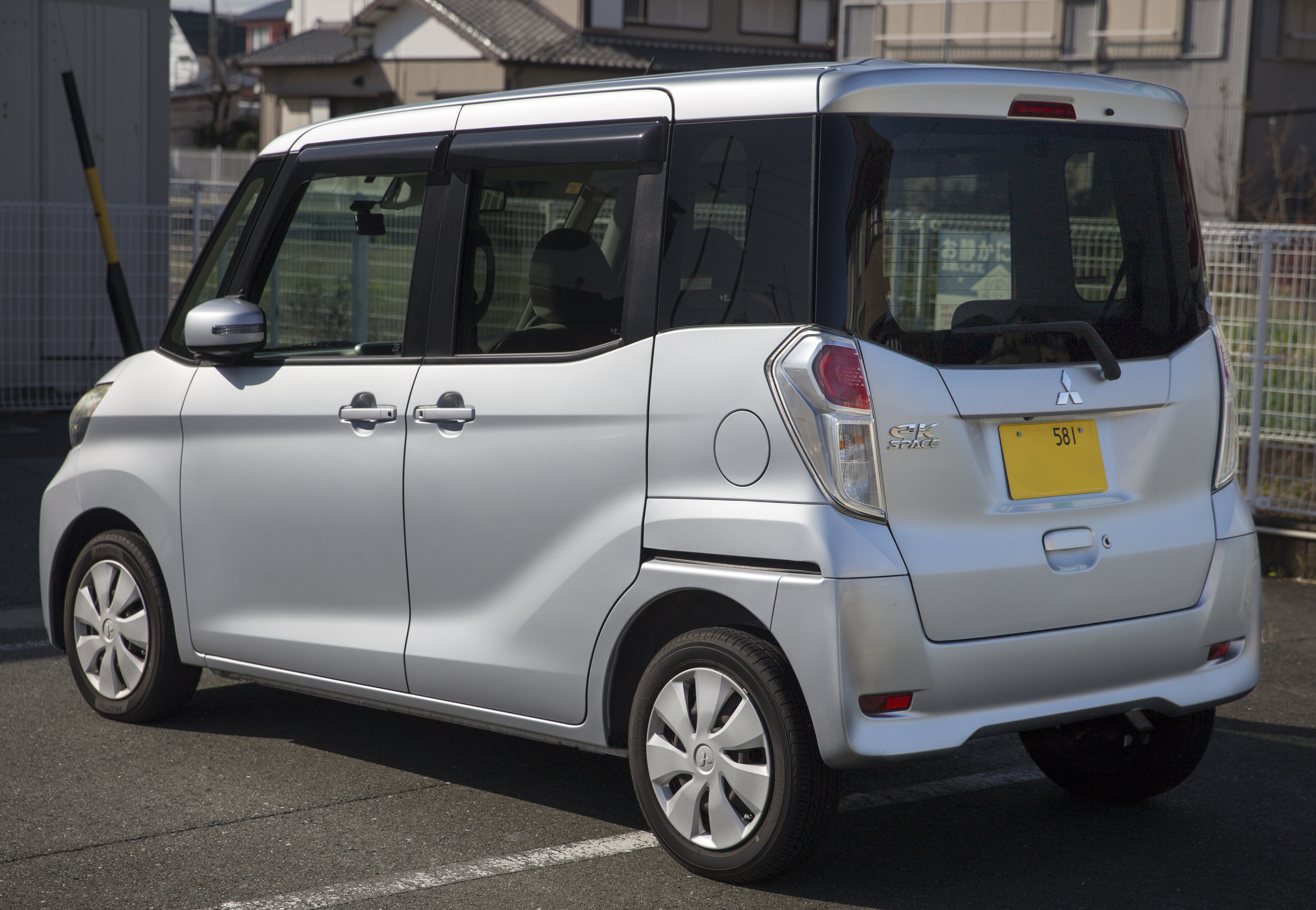
Mitsubishi eK Space (facelift) rear view

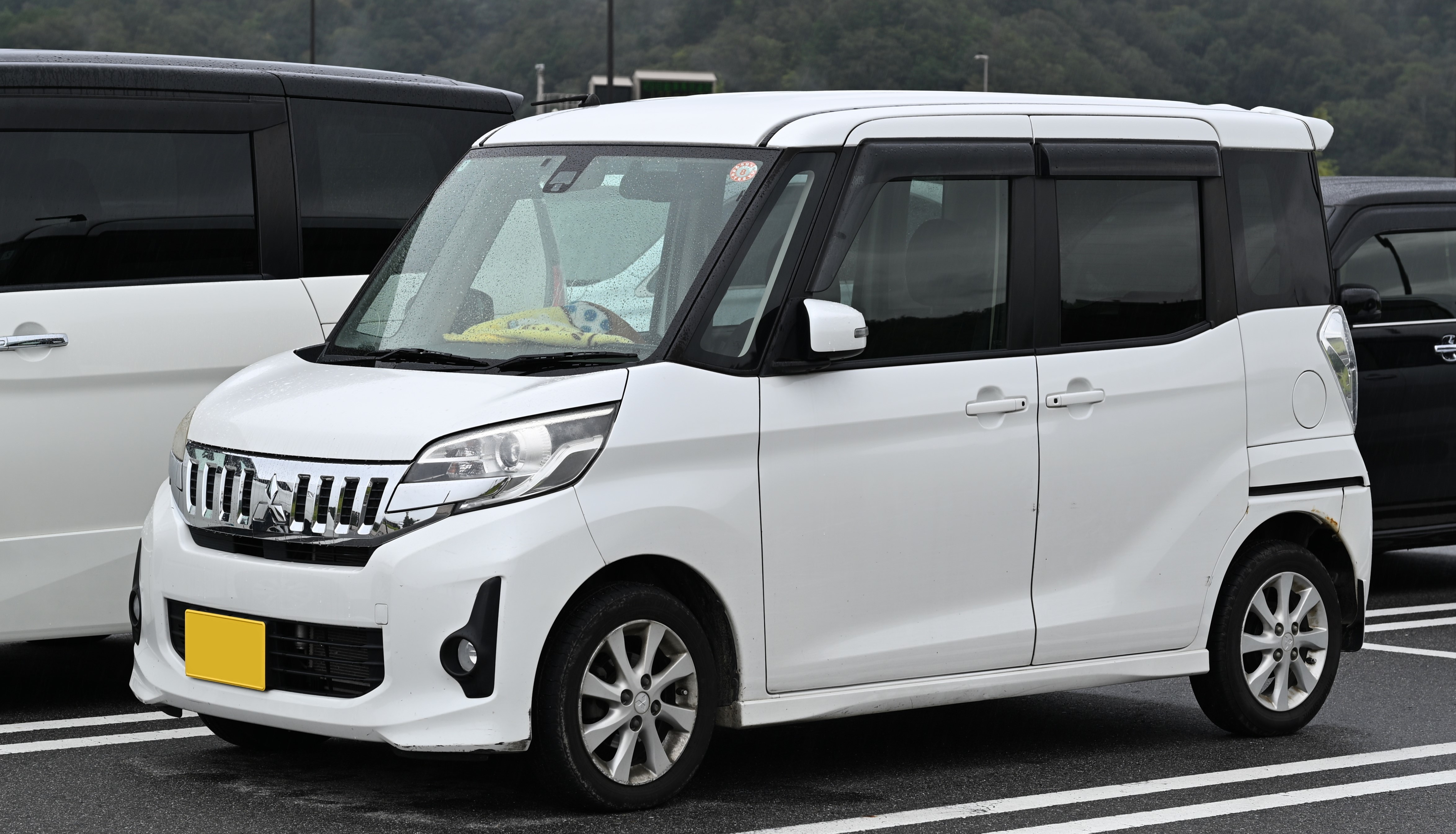
2014–2016 Mitsubishi eK Space Custom G

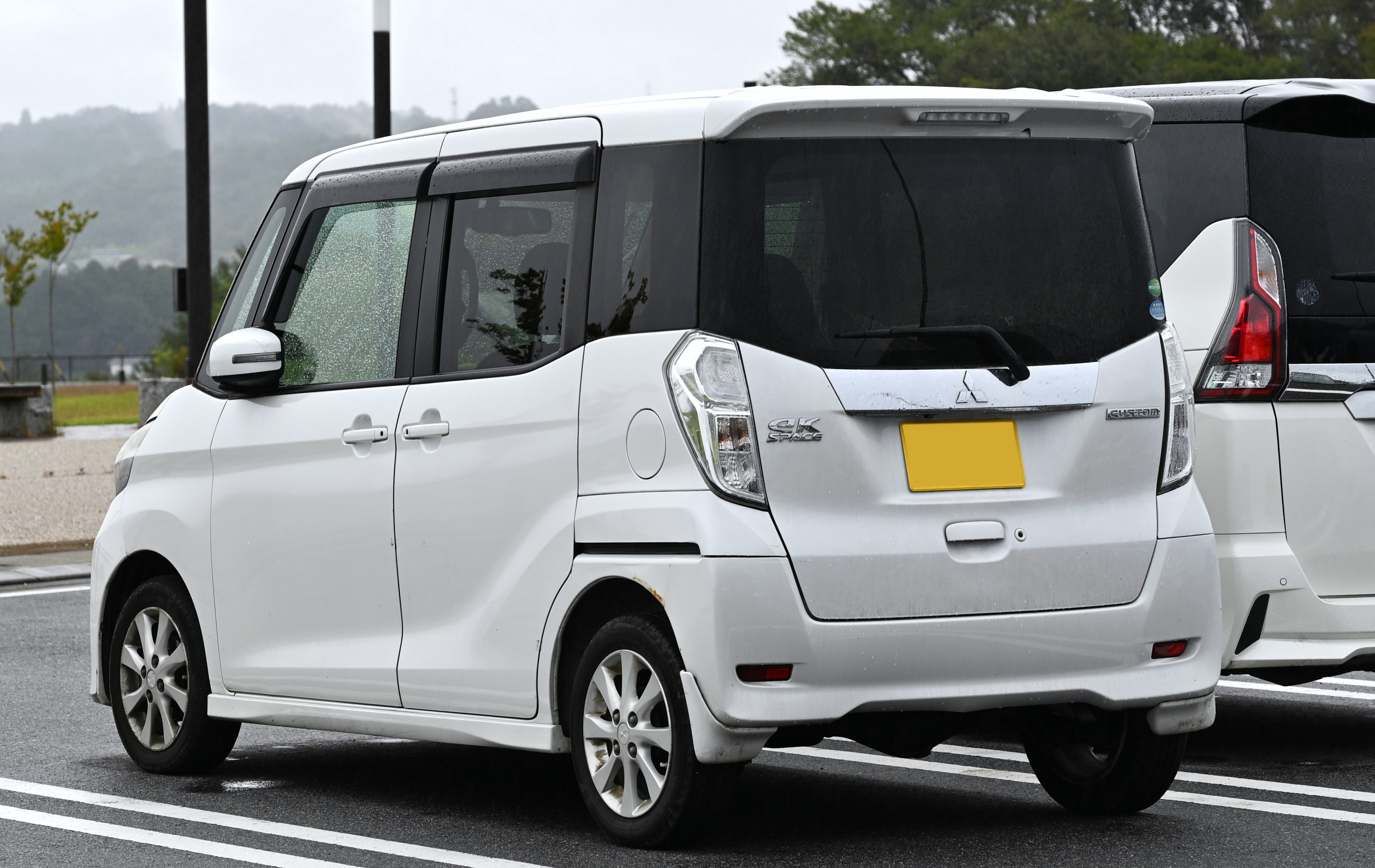
2014–2016 Mitsubishi eK Space Custom G rear view

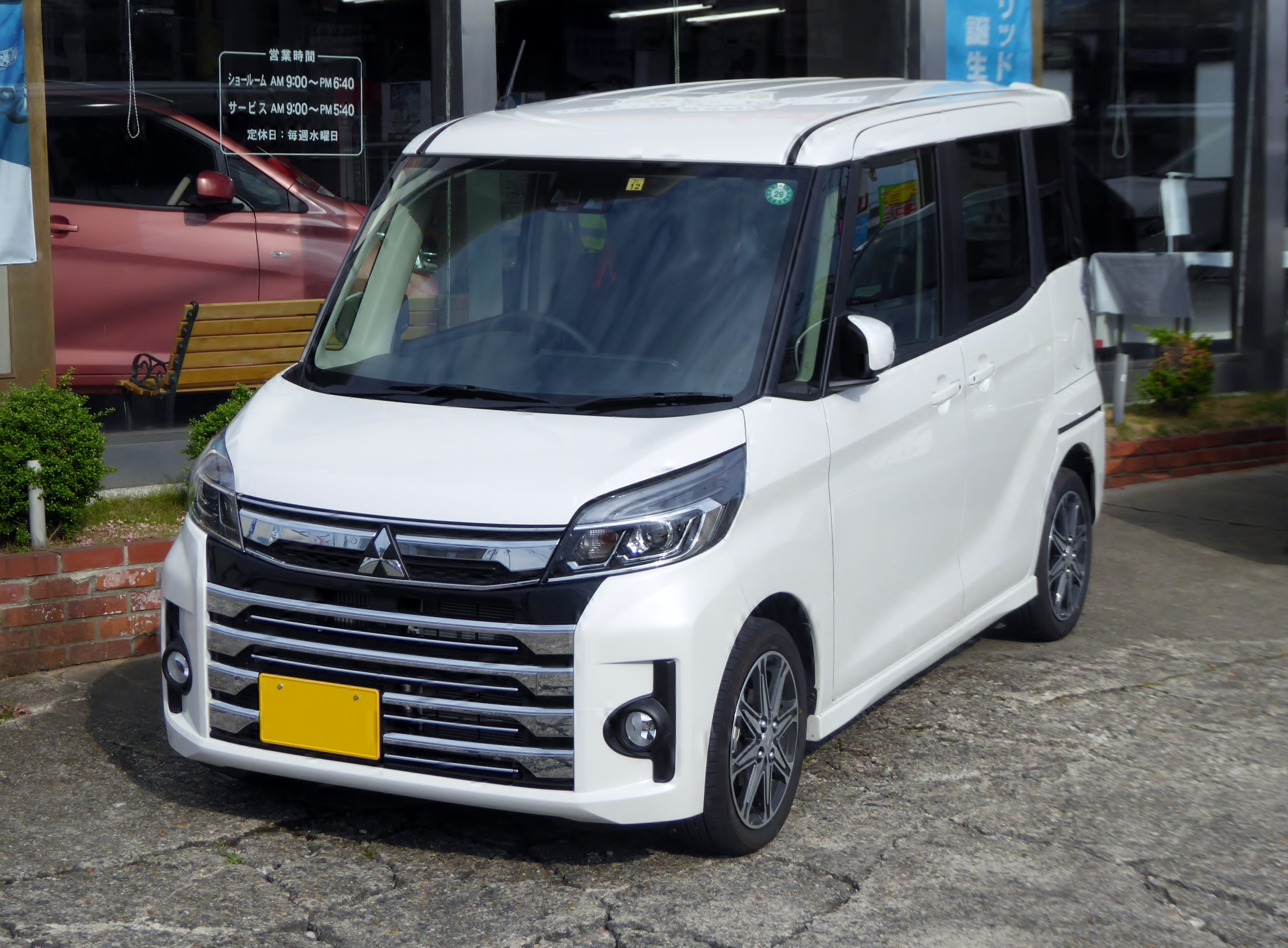
Mitsubishi eK Space Custom (facelift)

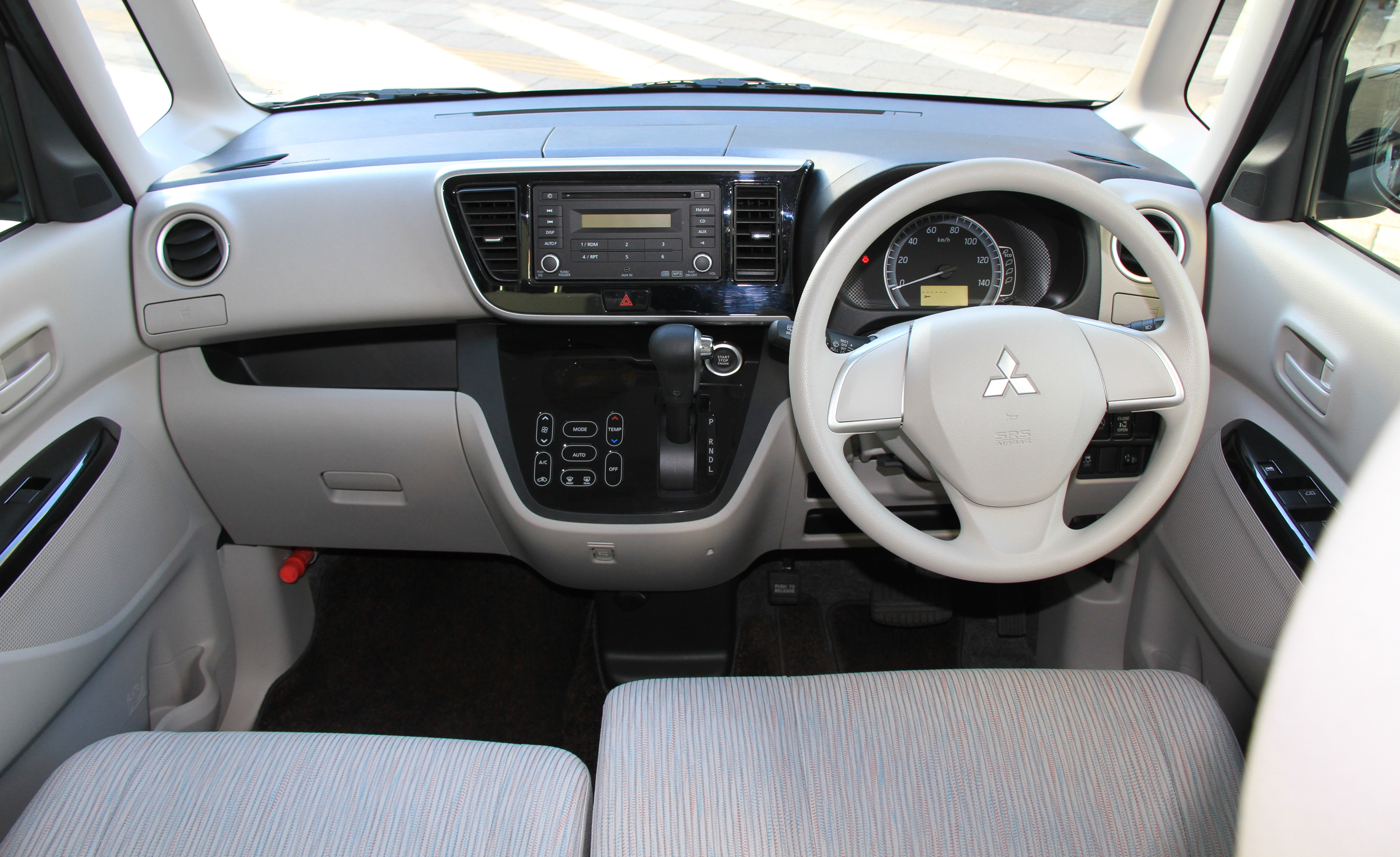
Interior

Nissan Dayz Roox

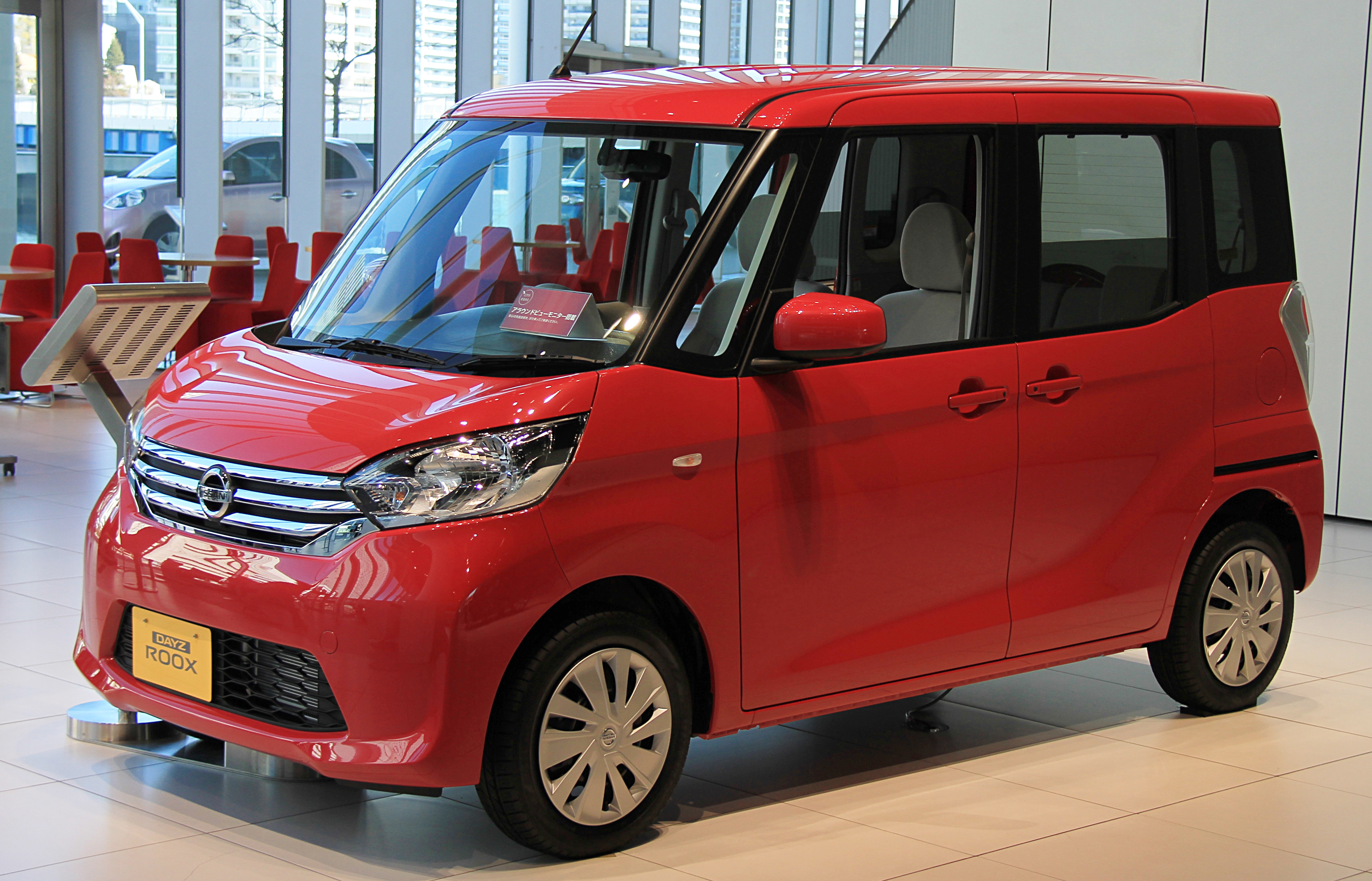
Nissan Dayz Roox (pre-facelift)

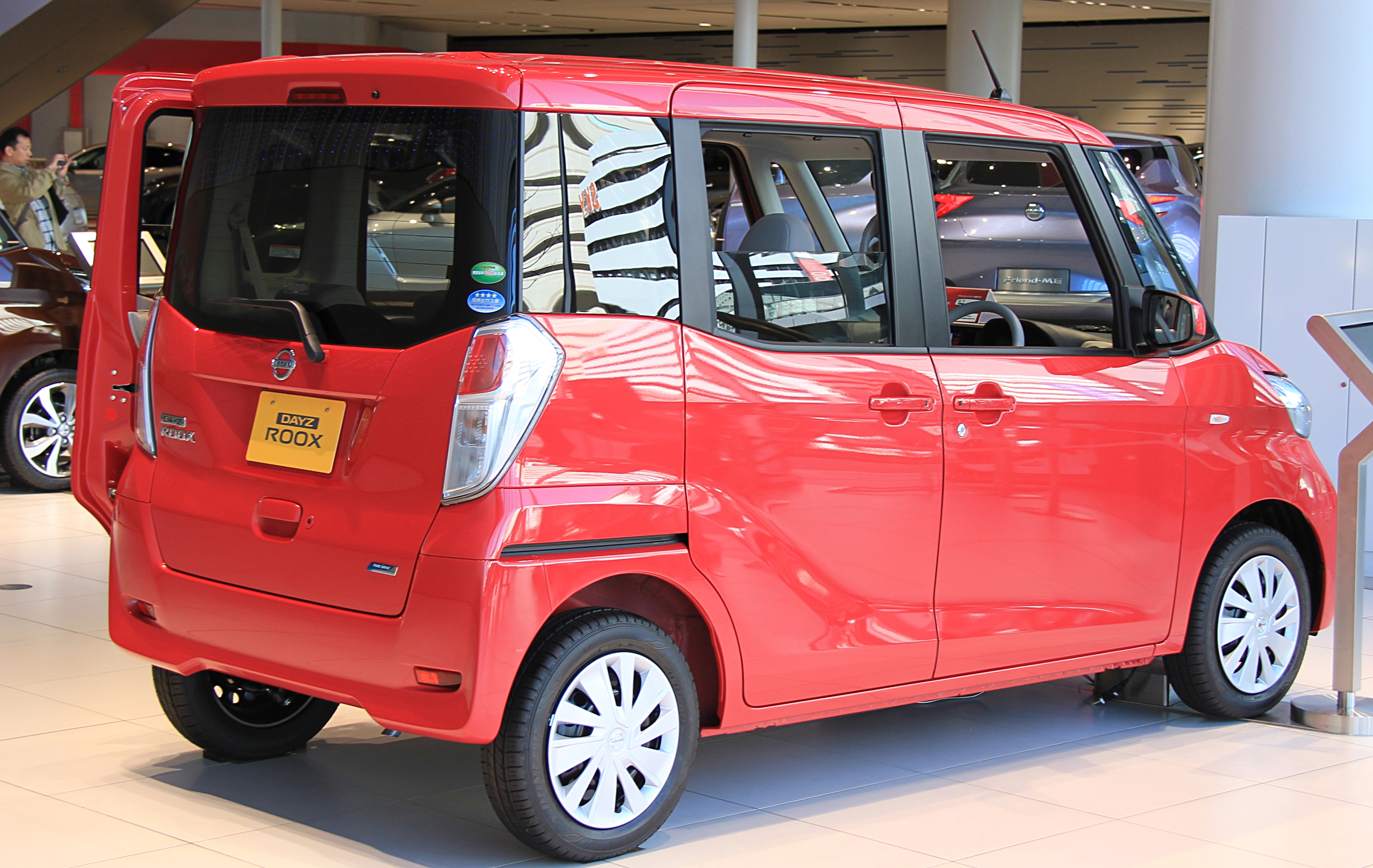
Nissan Dayz Roox (pre-facelift)

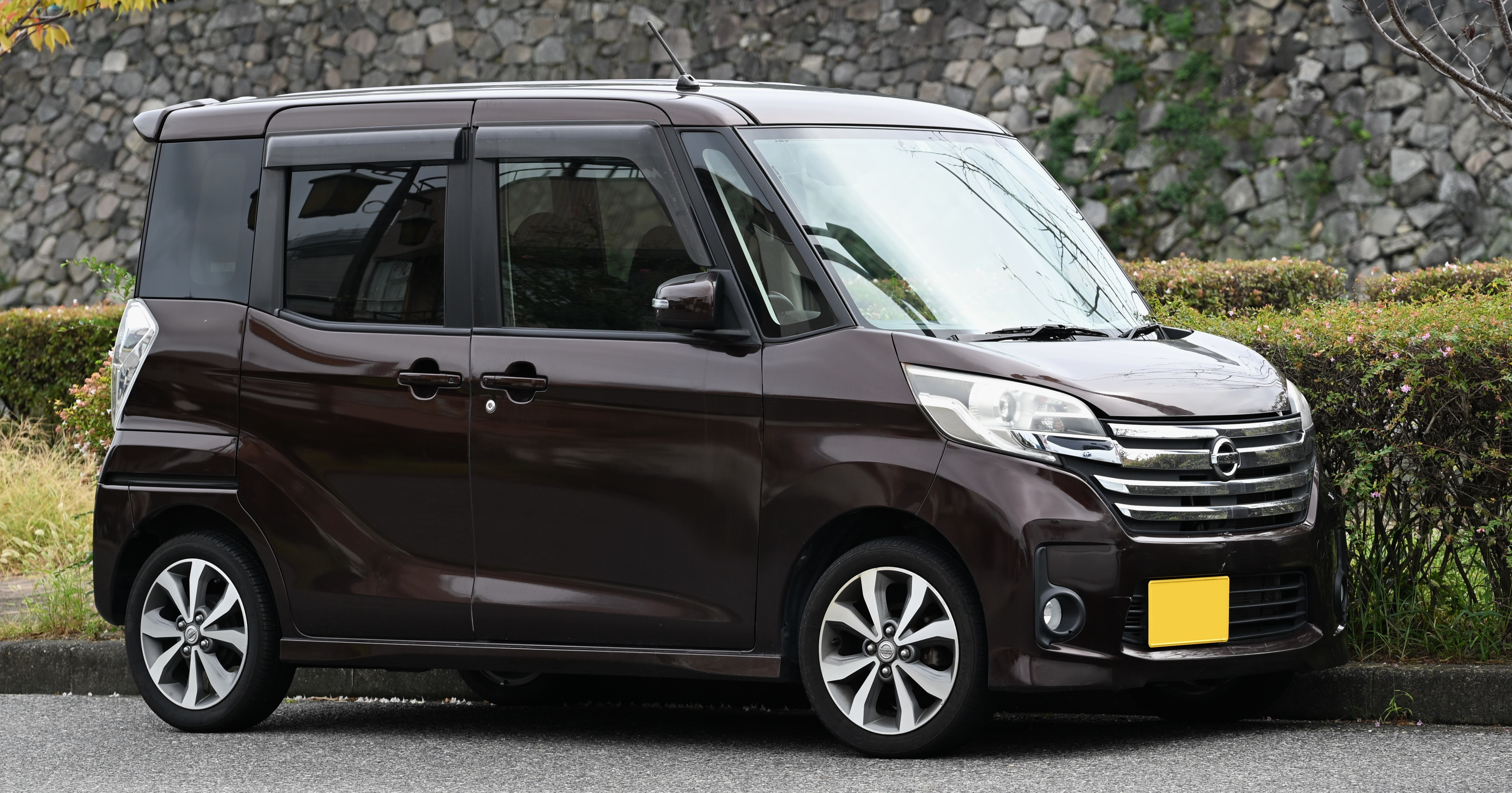
Nissan Dayz Roox Highway Star (pre-facelift)

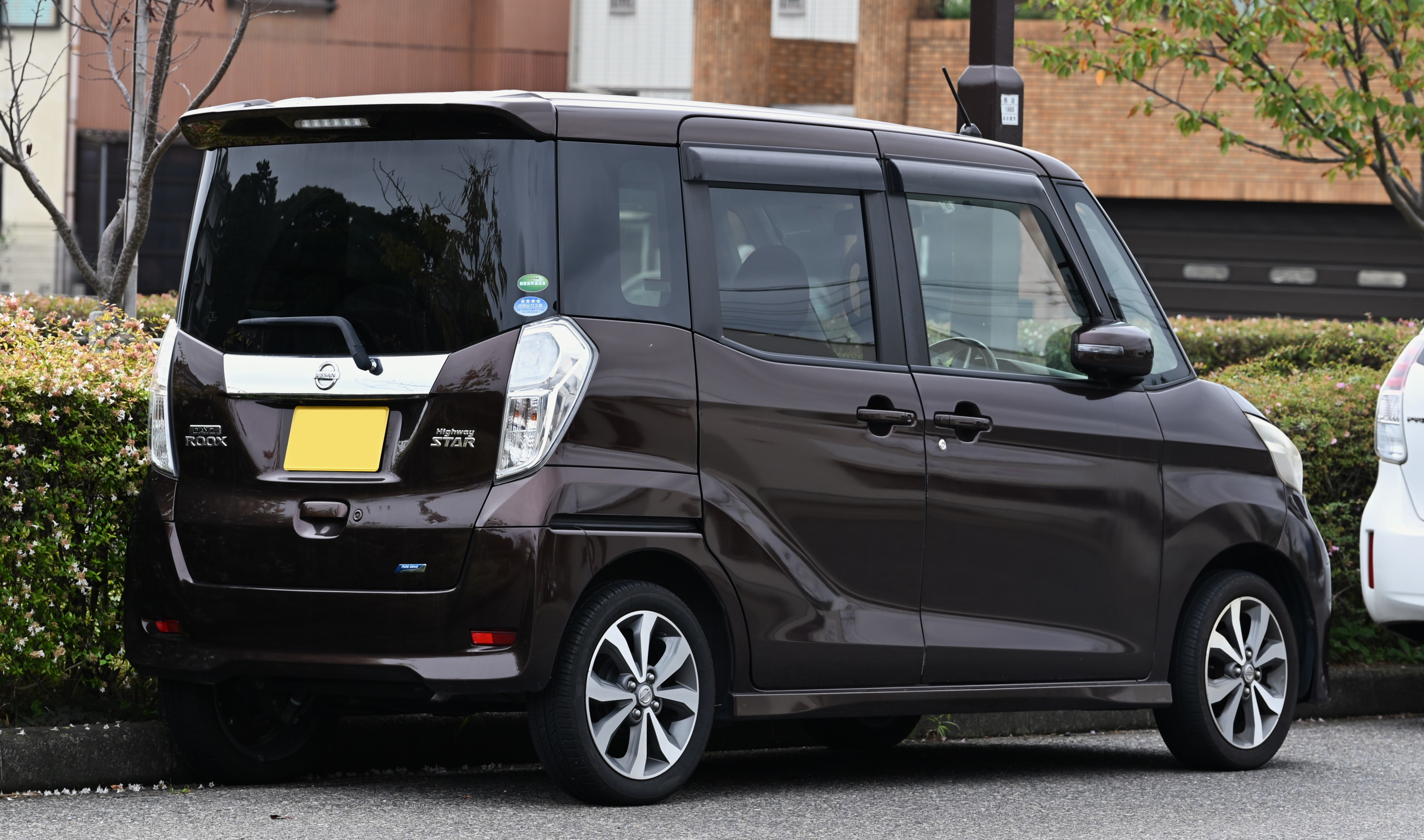
Nissan Dayz Roox Highway Star (pre-facelift)

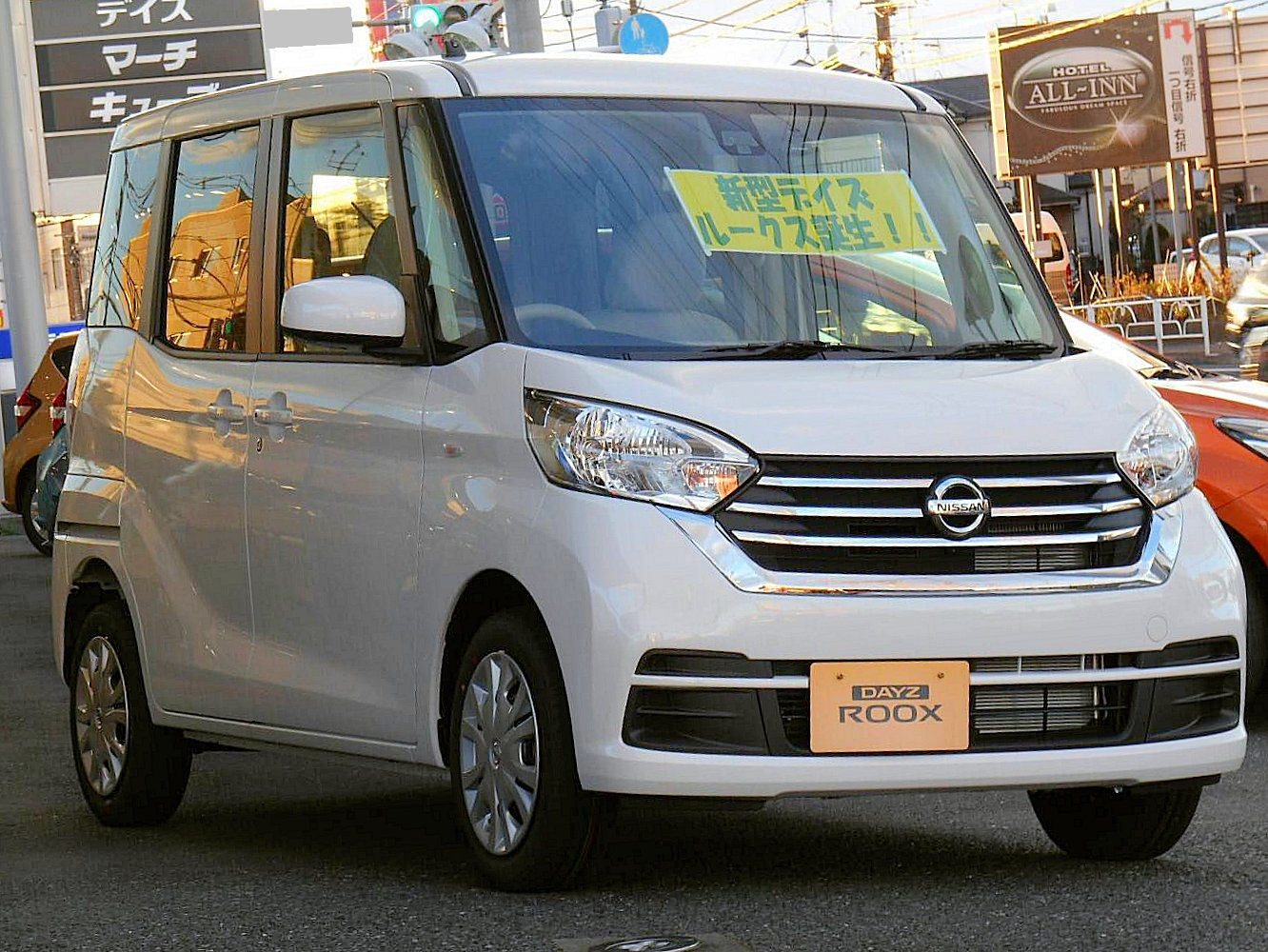
Nissan Dayz Roox (facelift)

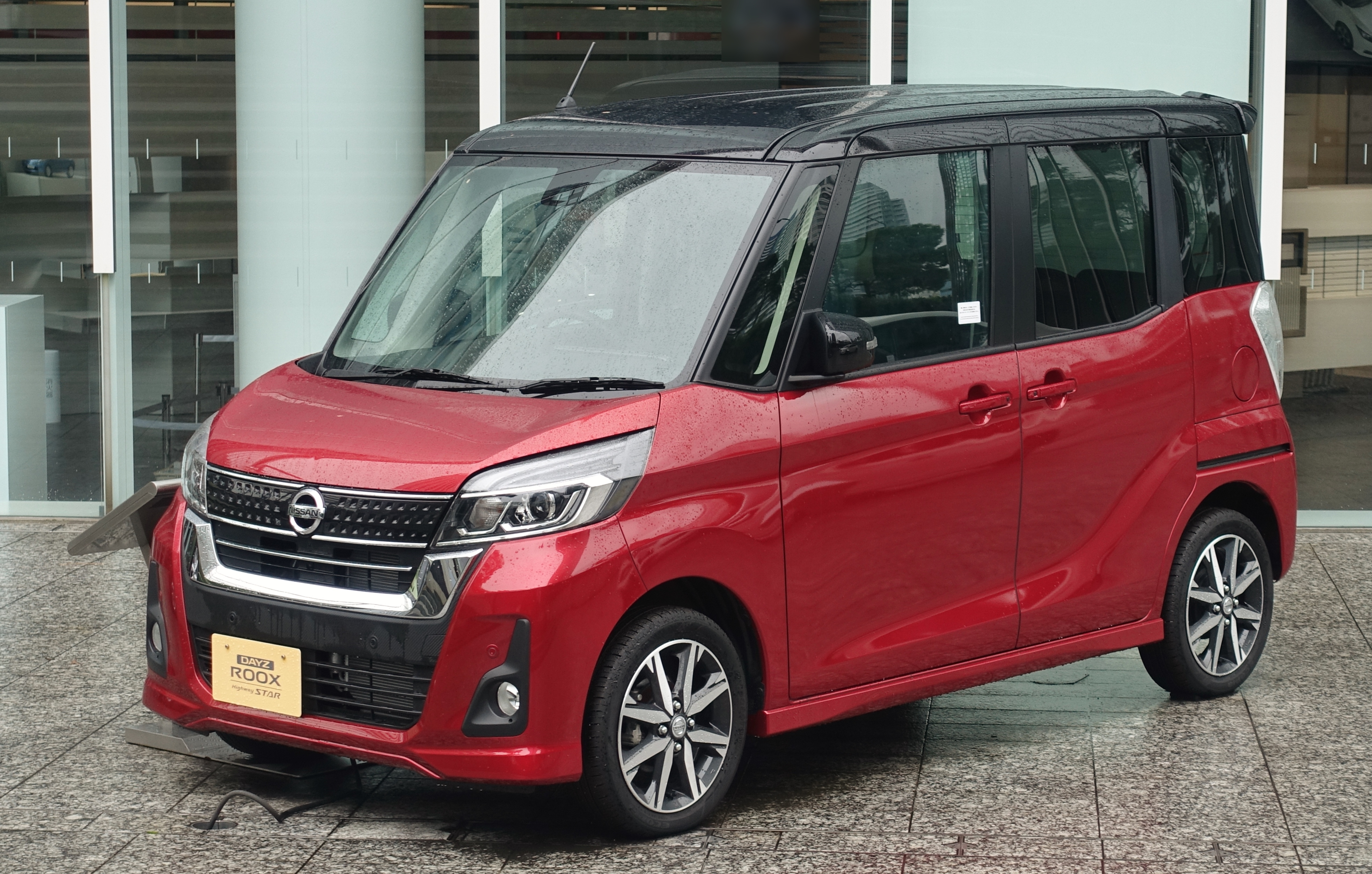
Nissan Dayz Roox Highway Star (facelift)

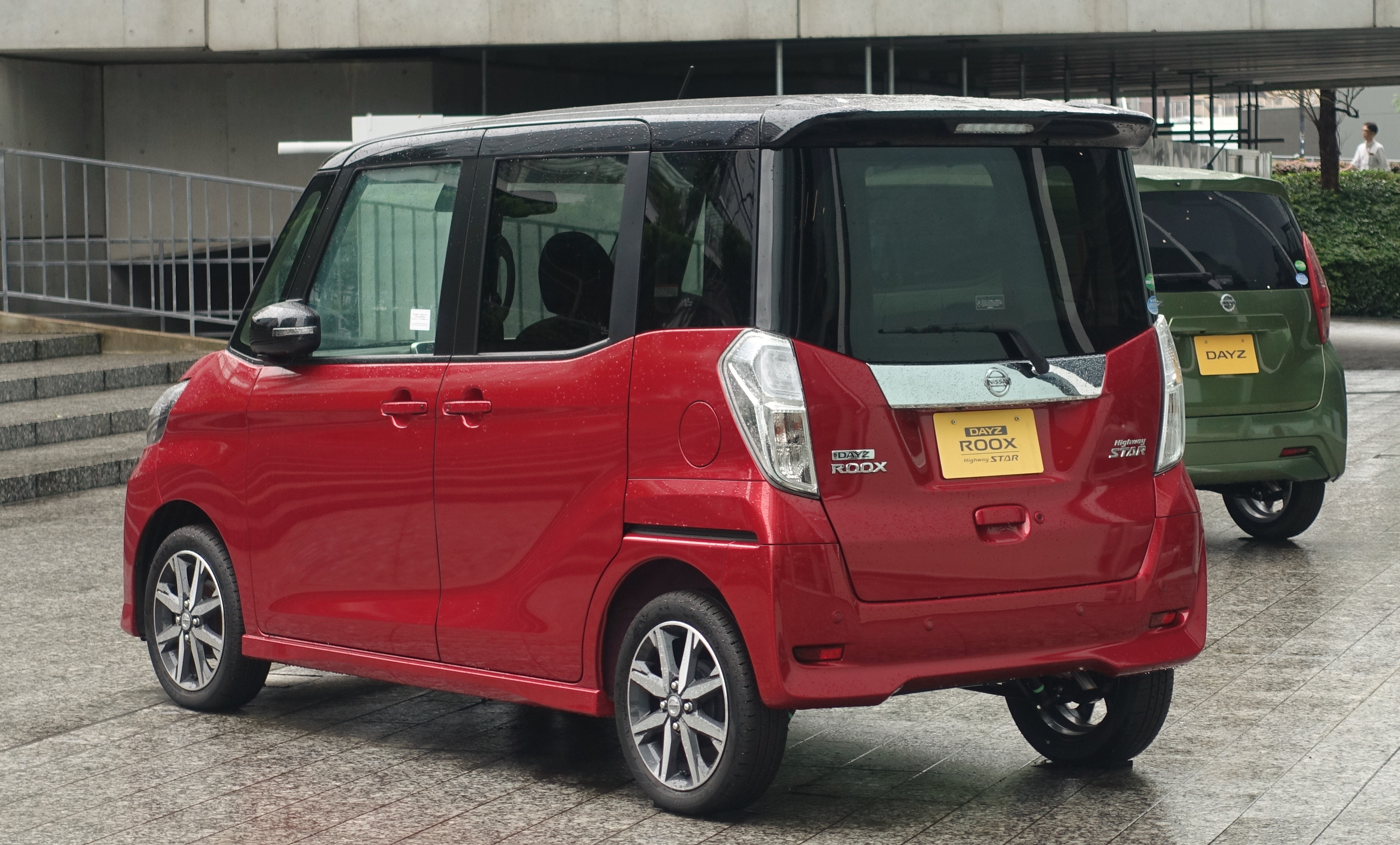
Nissan Dayz Roox Highway Star (facelift)

== Second generation (2020) ==
Second generation
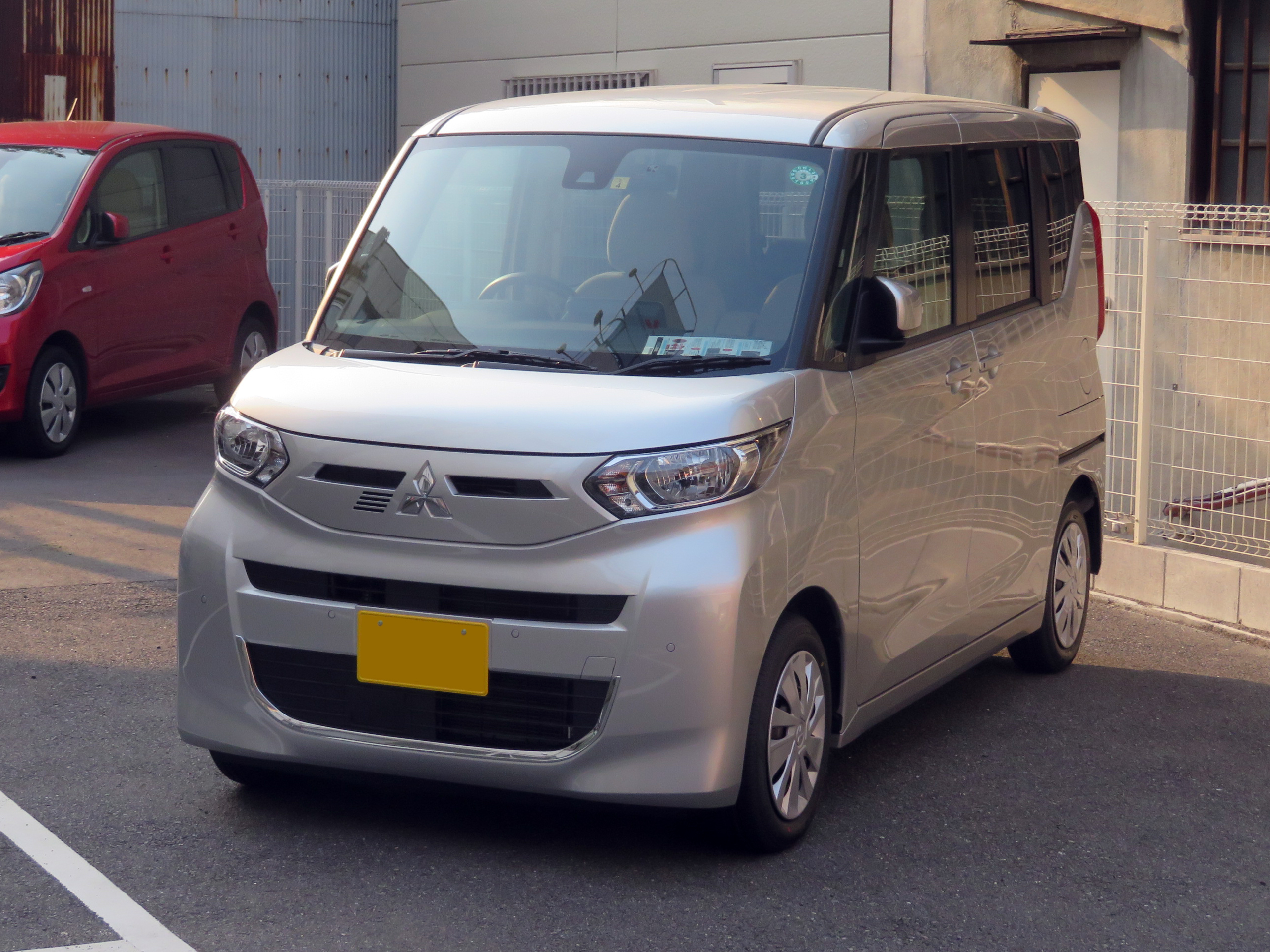

Overview
- Model code: B34; B35; B37; B38; B44; B45; B47; B48; BA1 (Roox)
- Also called: Nissan Roox
- Production: March 2020 – August 2025

Body and chassis
- Related: Mitsubishi Delica Mini (first generation); Mitsubishi eK (fourth generation)

Powertrain
- Engine: Petrol: 658 cc BR06DE I3; 658 cc BR06DET turbo I3
- Electric motor: SM21 (MHEV)
- Transmission: CVT

Dimensions
- Wheelbase: 2,495 mm (98.2 in)
- Length: 3,395 mm (133.7 in)
- Width: 1,475 mm (58.1 in)
- Height: 1,780–1,800 mm (70.1–70.9 in)
- Curb weight: 940–1,020 kg (2,072–2,249 lb)

Chronology
- Successor: Mitsubishi Delica Mini (for eK X Space)

The second generation eK Space and its crossover SUV-styled variant, called the eK X Space (pronounced "eK Cross Space"), were unveiled on 6 February 2020, and went on sale on 19 March 2020. Mitsubishi used various B30 and B40-series model codes, while Nissan's internal code for their Roox rebadge is BA1. After it was determined that the driver's side airbags did not meet the required standards, production was halted from December 2021 until February 2022. All examples of the eK Space and Roox built after December 2020 were recalled to have the driver's airbags replaced and additional knee airbags installed.

In April 2023, facelifted versions of the eK Space and the Nissan Roox were announced, while the eK Cross Space was renamed Delica Mini (while also undergoing some design changes). The eK Space was immediately available, while the updated Roox went on sale two months later. The turbocharged eK Space T was discontinued, leaving only the G and M models. The Roox Autech variant was also removed from the price lists.

Mitsubishi eK Space

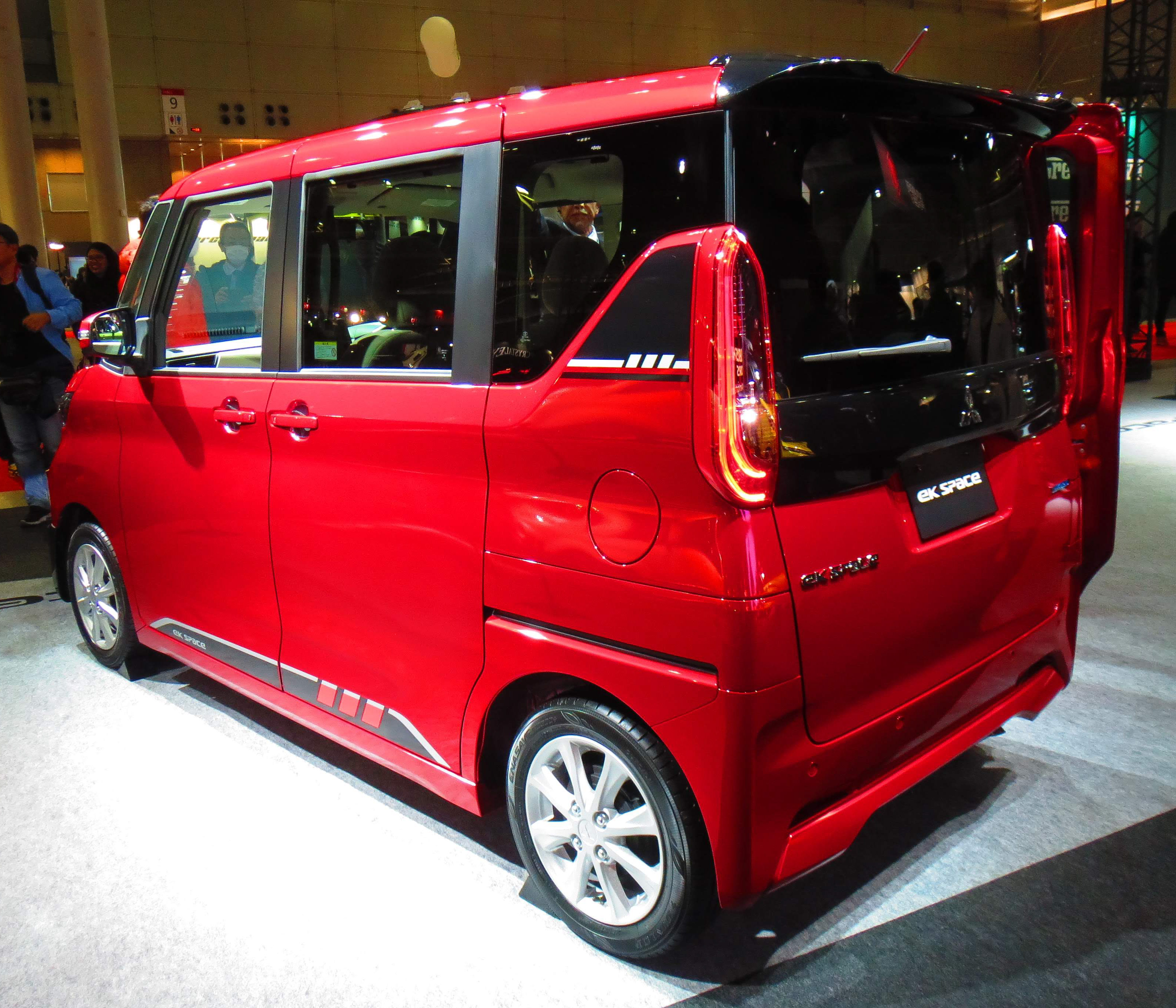
Rear view

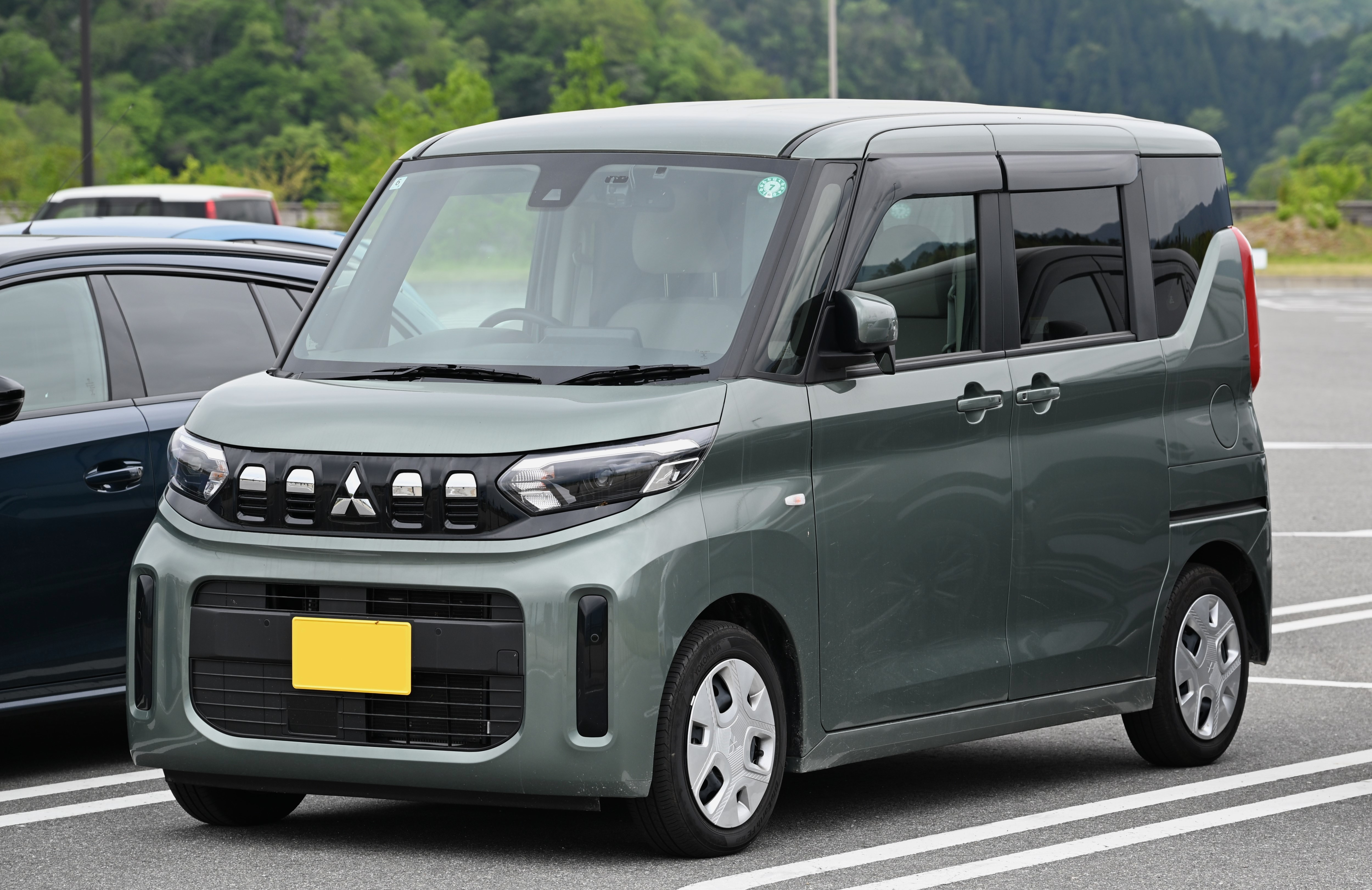
Mitsubishi eK Space G (facelift)

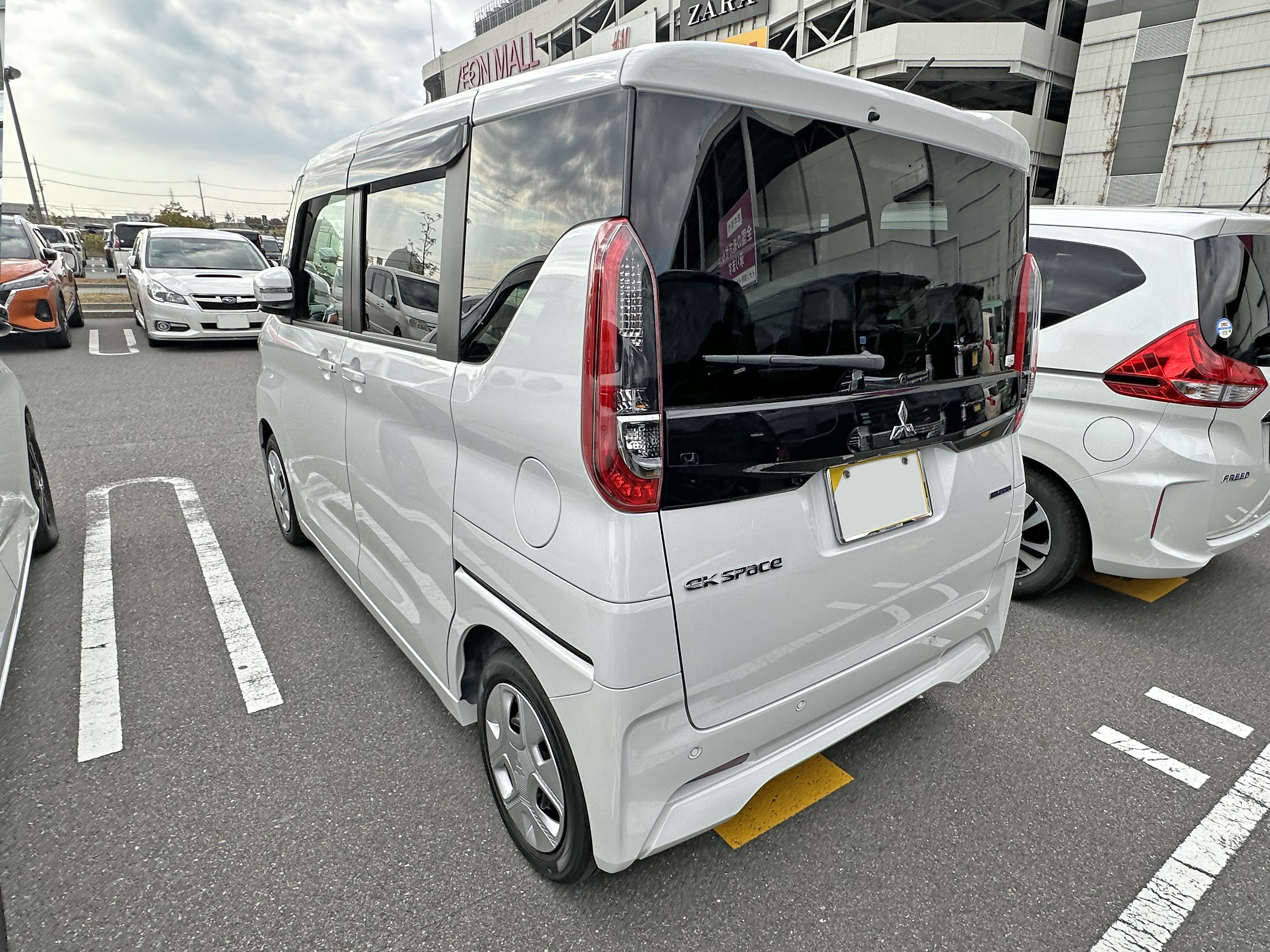
Mitsubishi eK space (facelift)

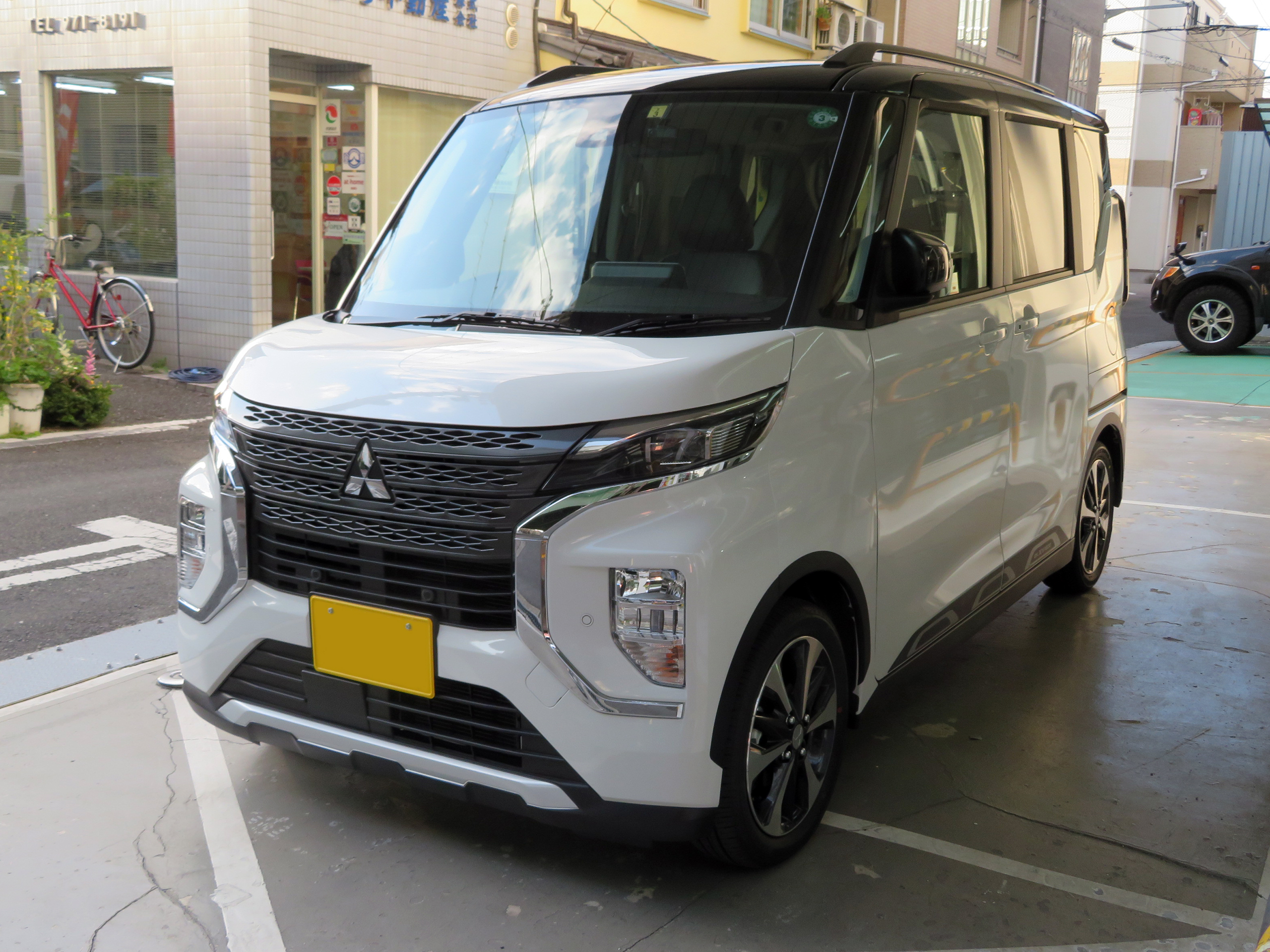
Mitsubishi eK X Space

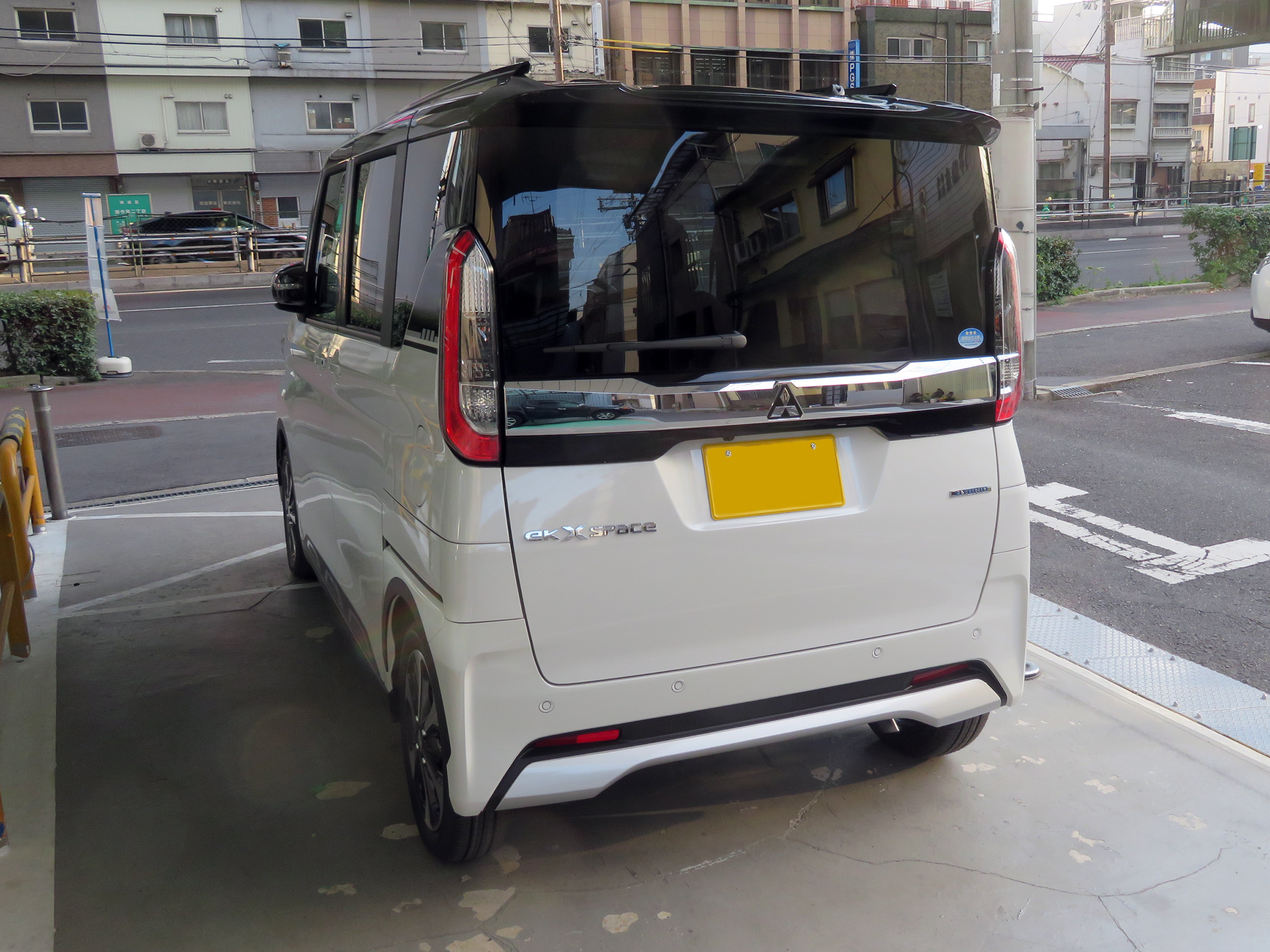
Mitsubishi eK X Space rear view

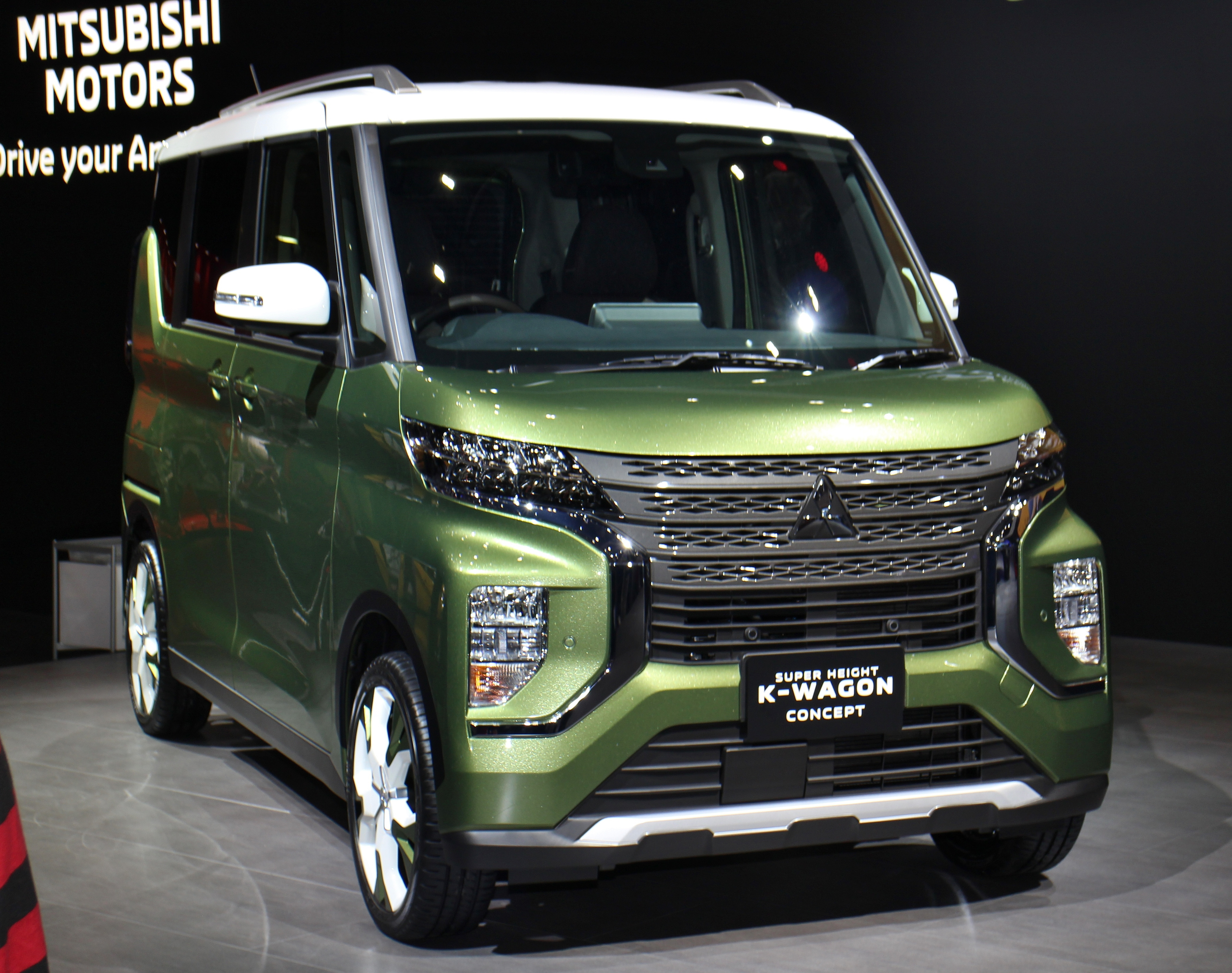
Mitsubishi Super Height K-Wagon Concept at the 2019 Tokyo Motor Show

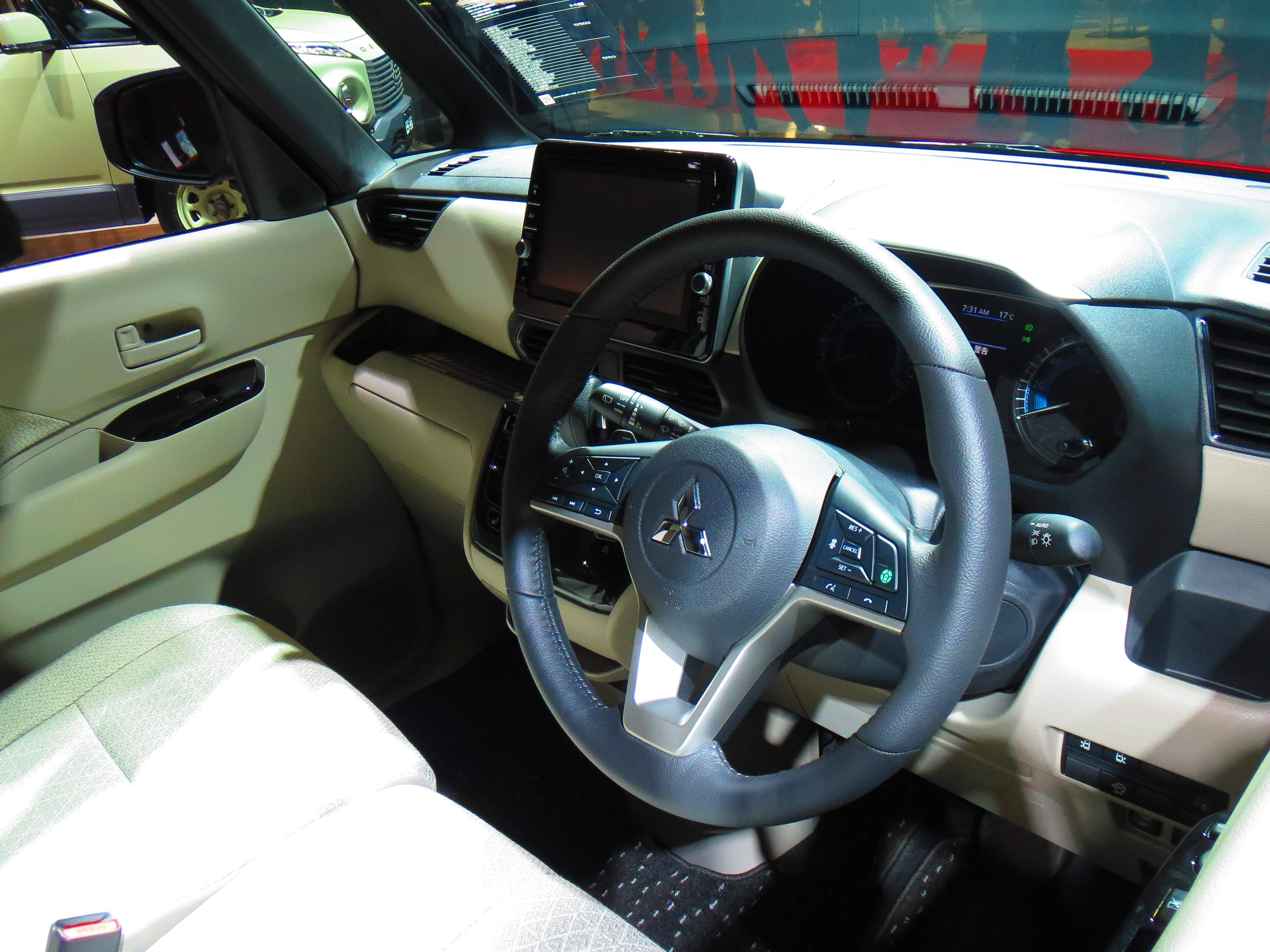
Interior

Nissan Roox

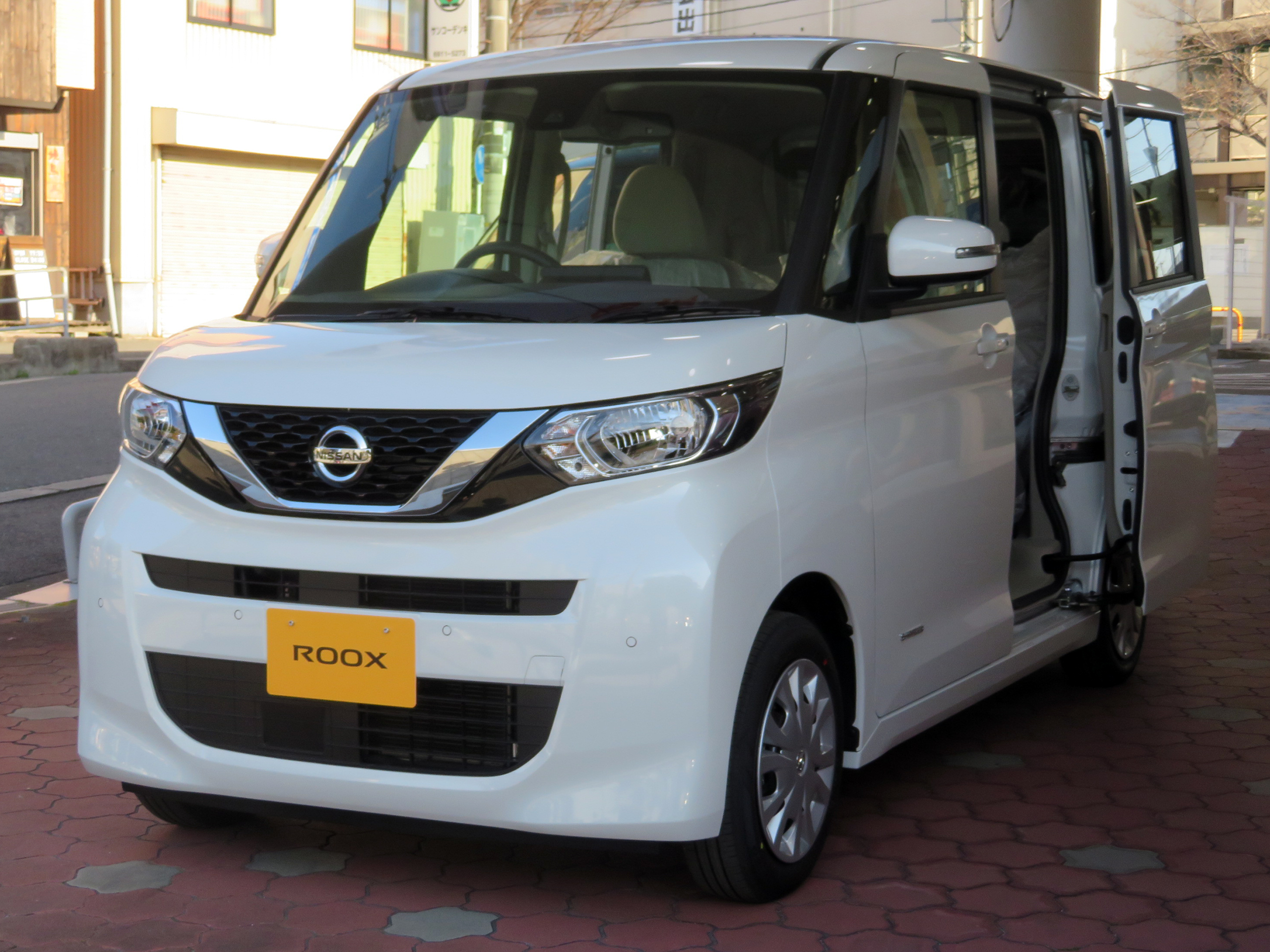
Nissan Roox (pre-facelift)

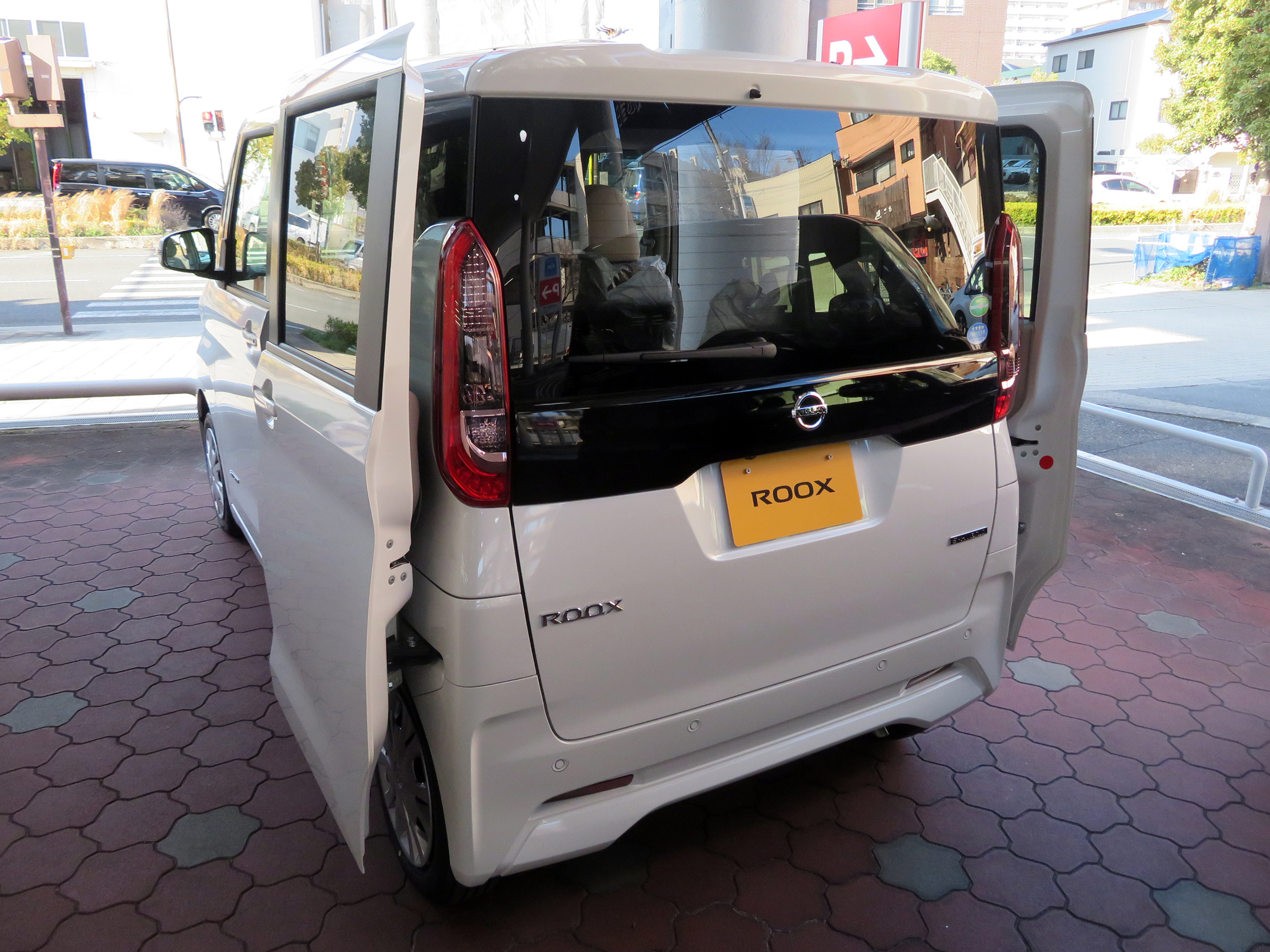
Nissan Roox (pre-facelift)

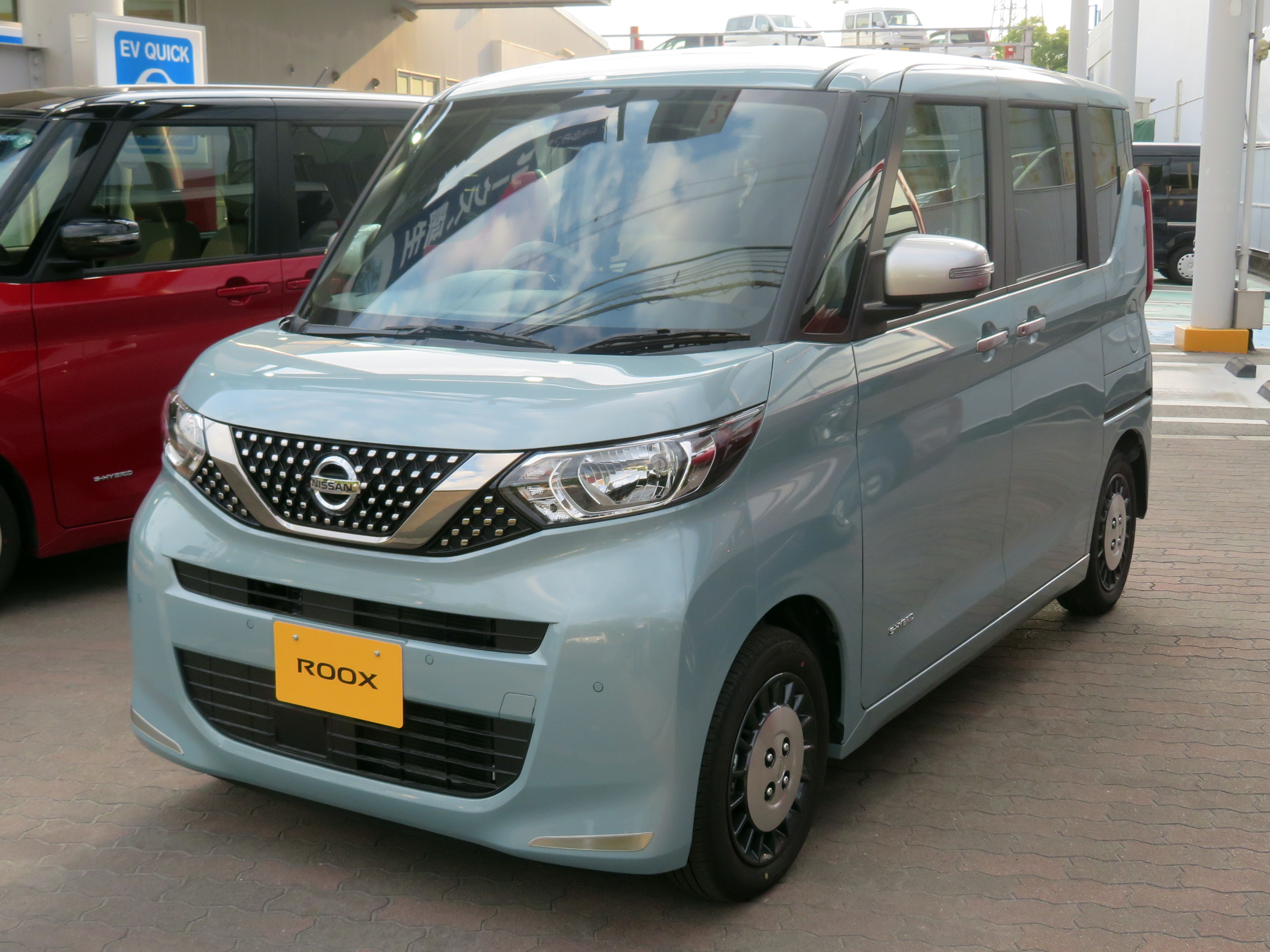
Nissan Roox Autech (pre-facelift)

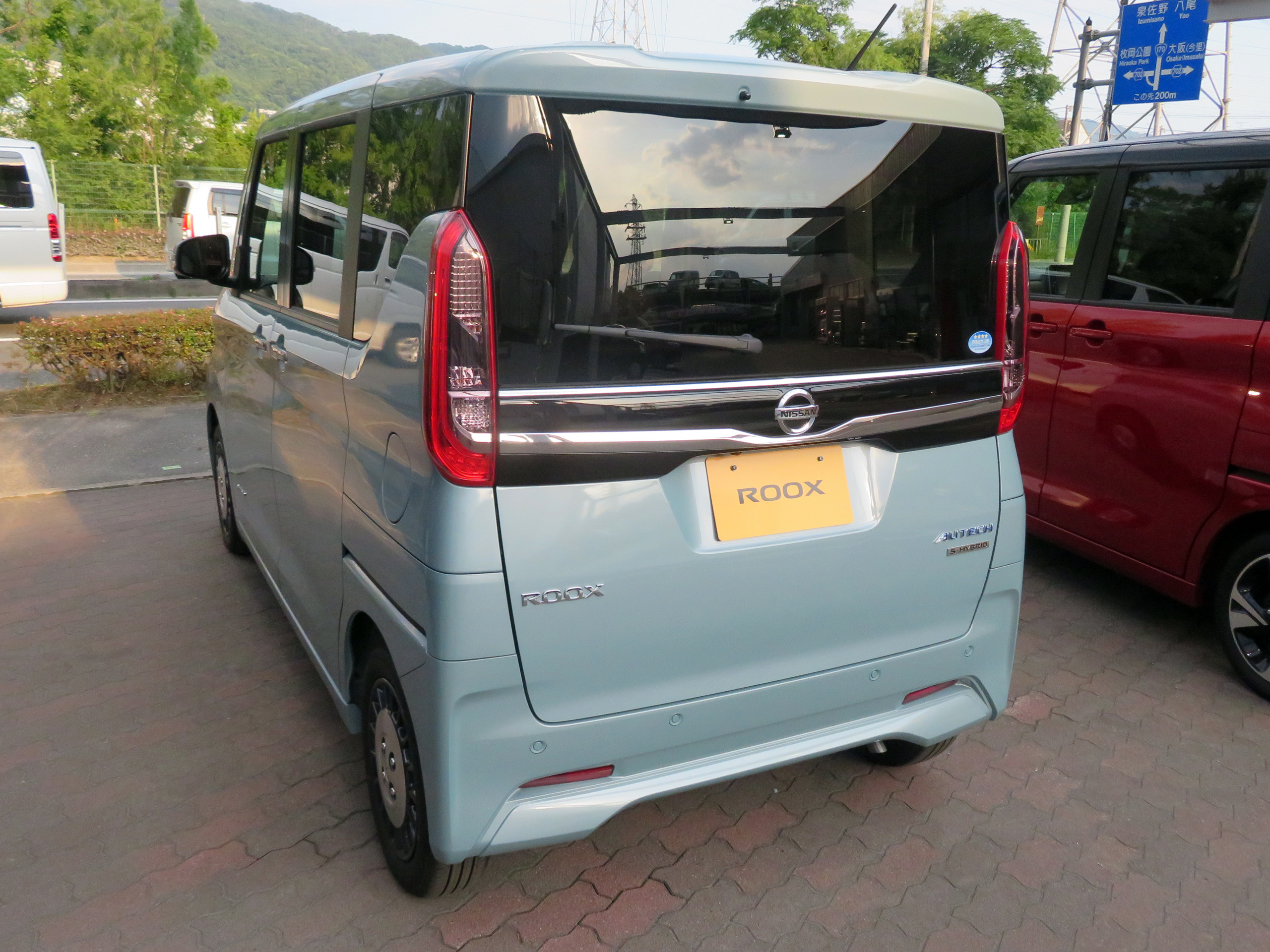
Nissan Roox Autech (pre-facelift)

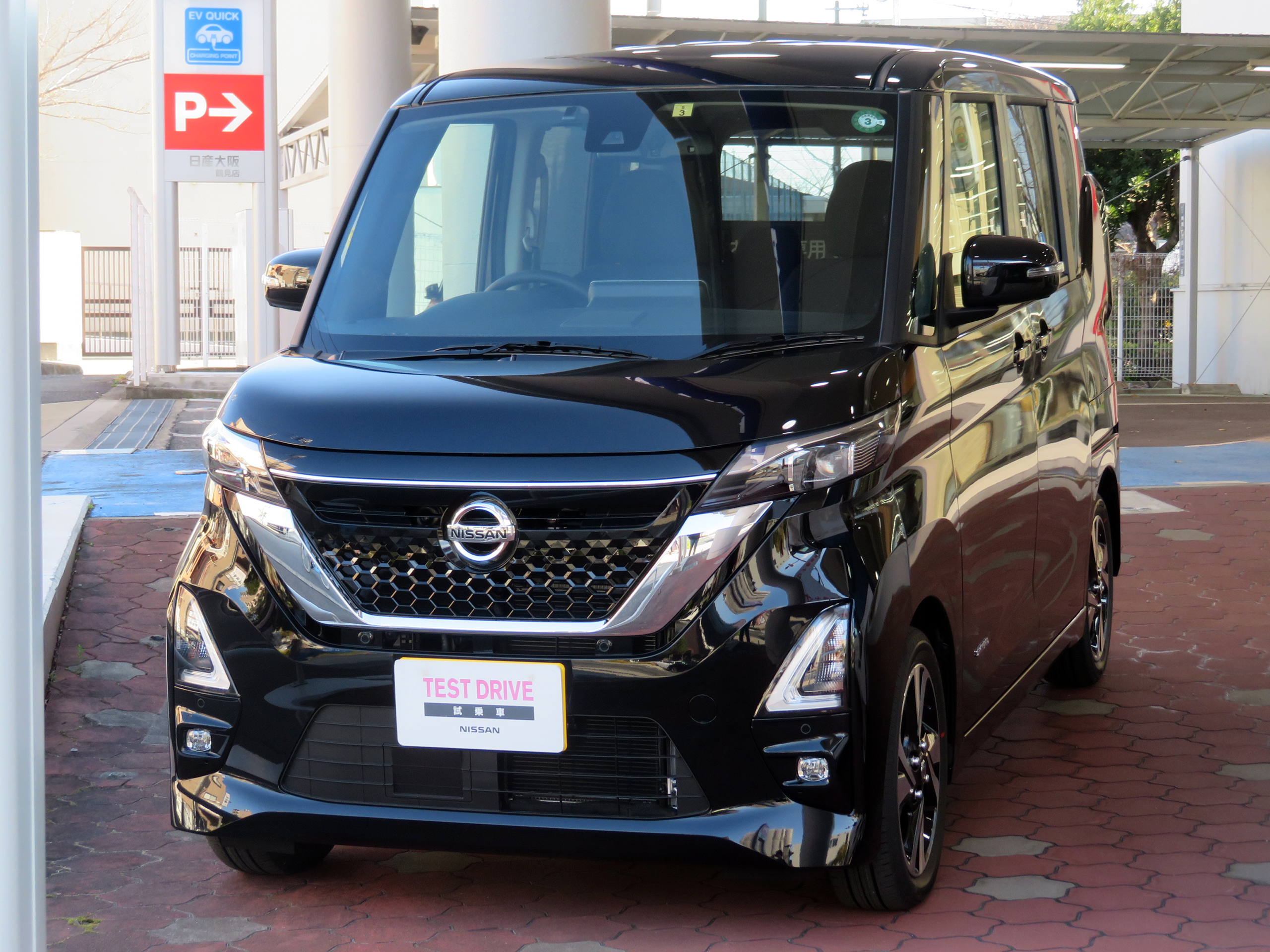
Nissan Roox Highway Star (pre-facelift)

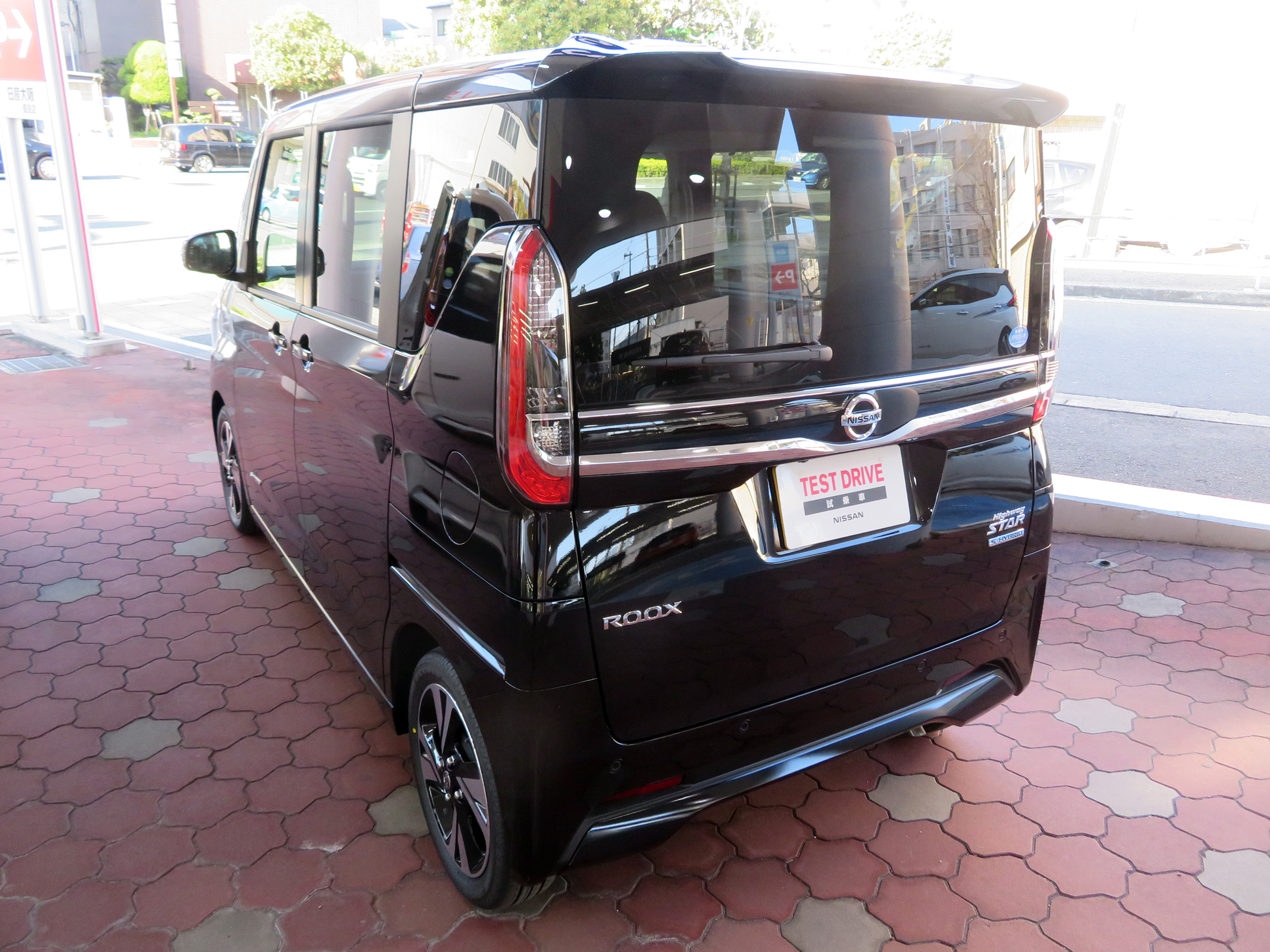
Nissan Roox Highway Star (pre-facelift)

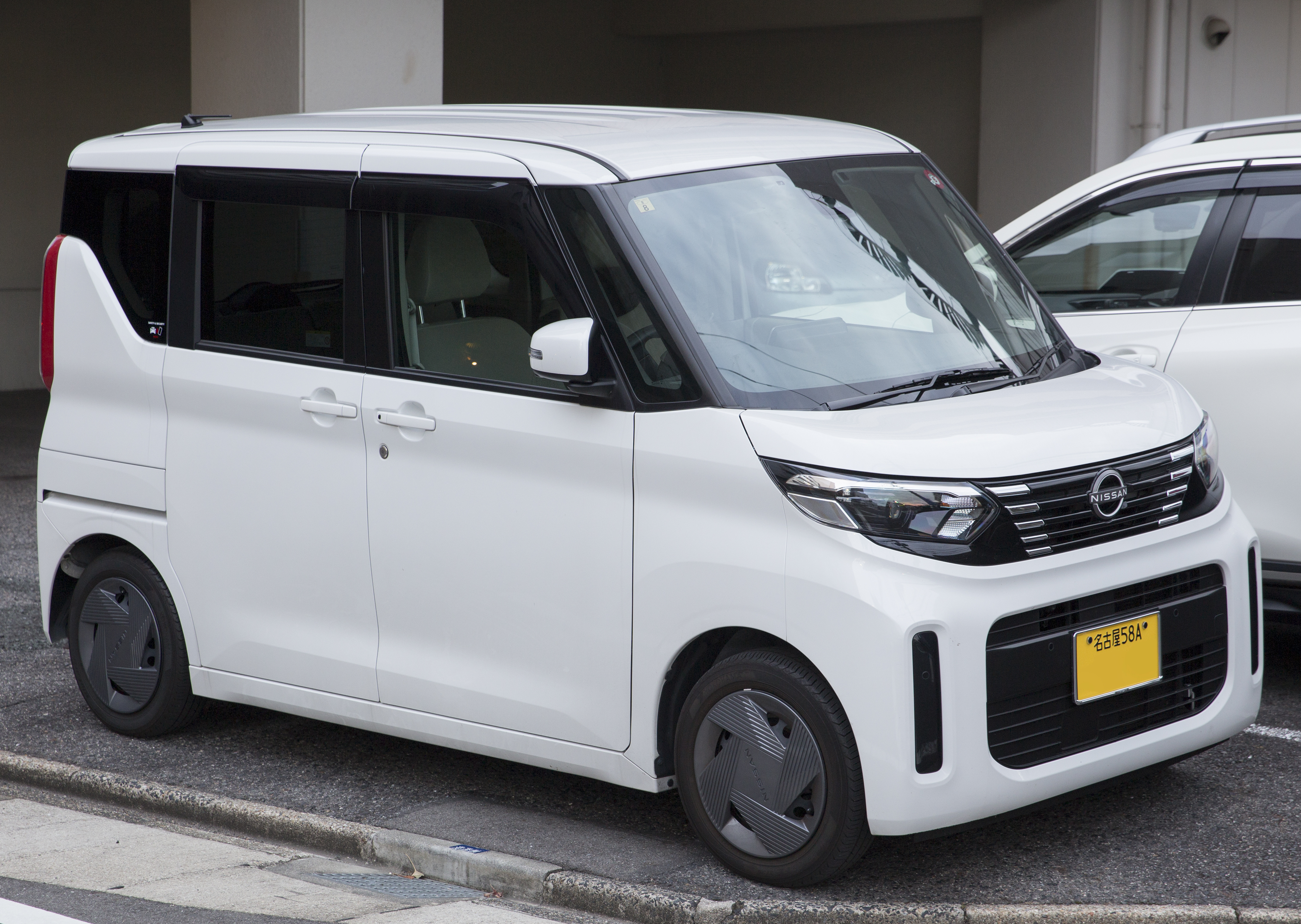
Nissan Roox (facelift)

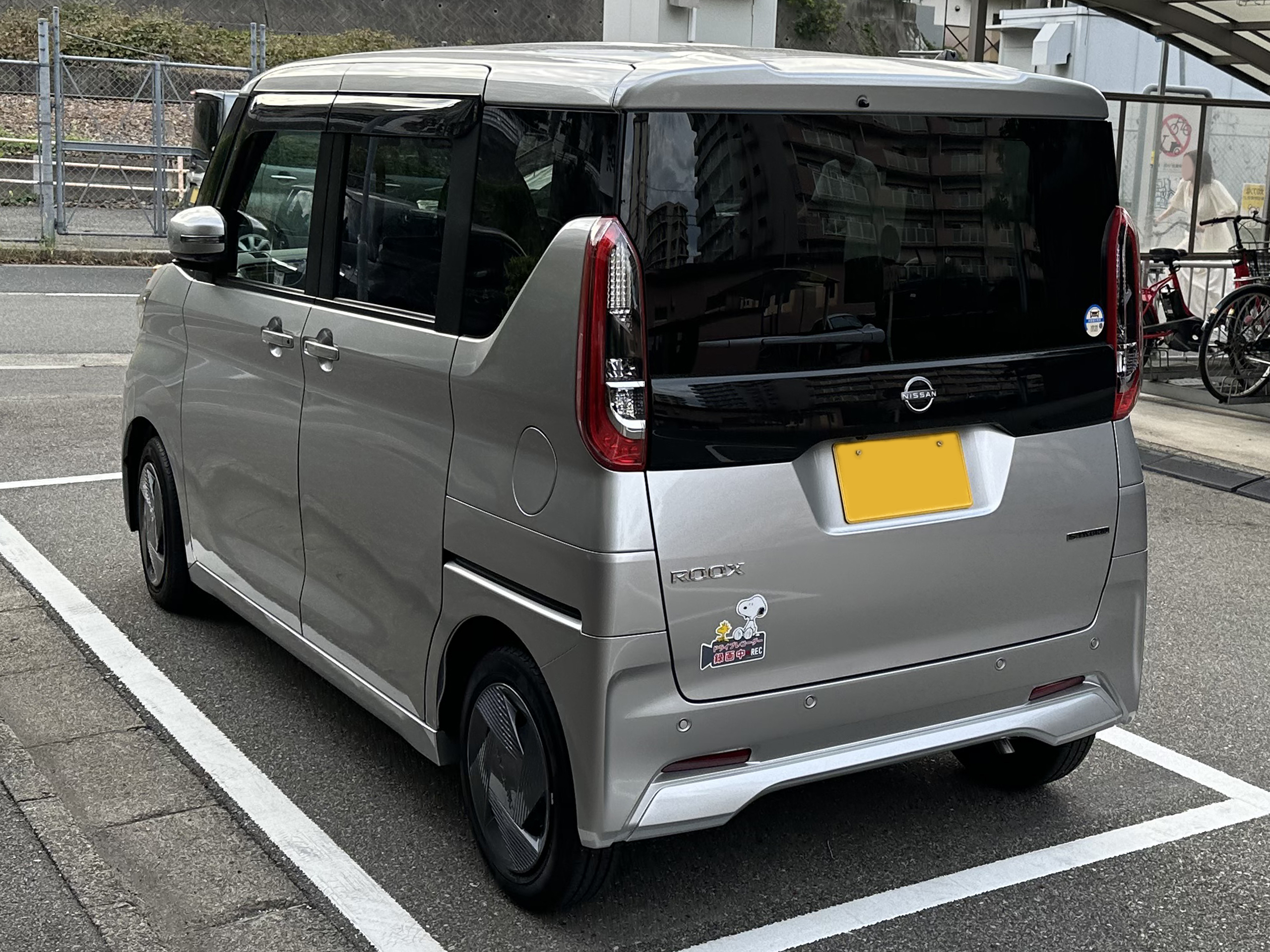
Nissan Roox (facelift)

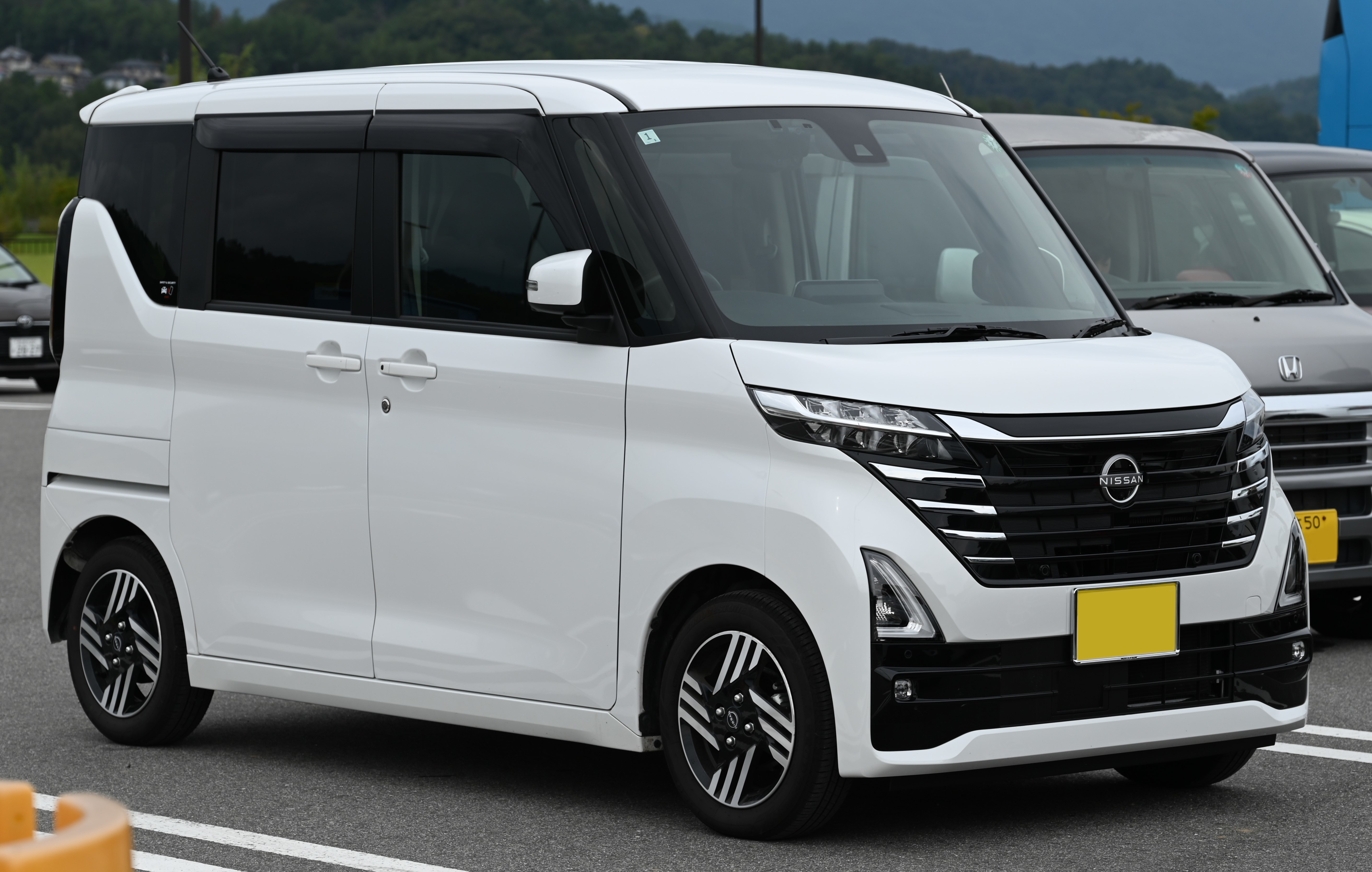
Nissan Roox Highway Star (facelift)

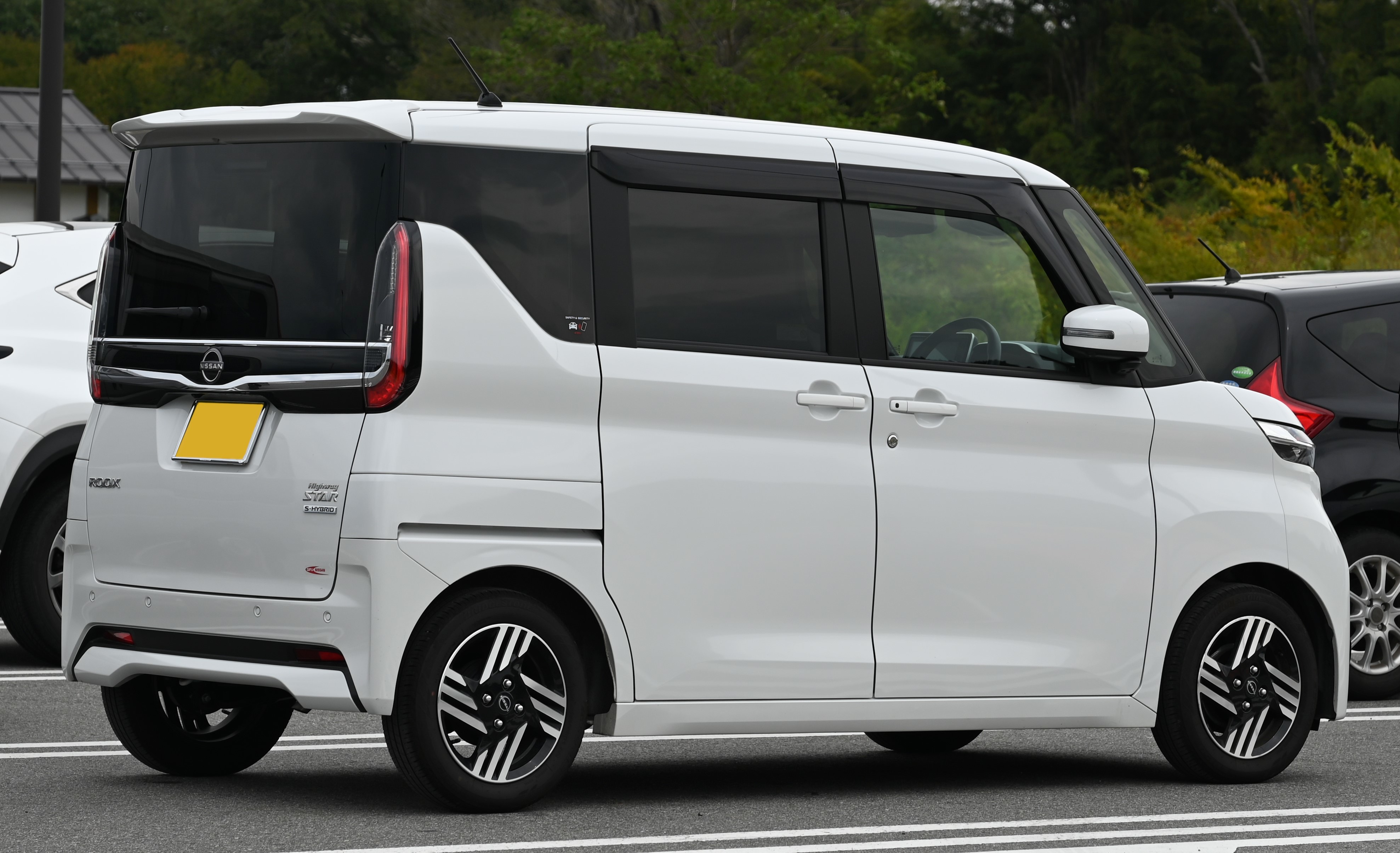
Nissan Roox Highway Star (facelift)

== Third generation (BA/BB; 2025) ==
Third generation
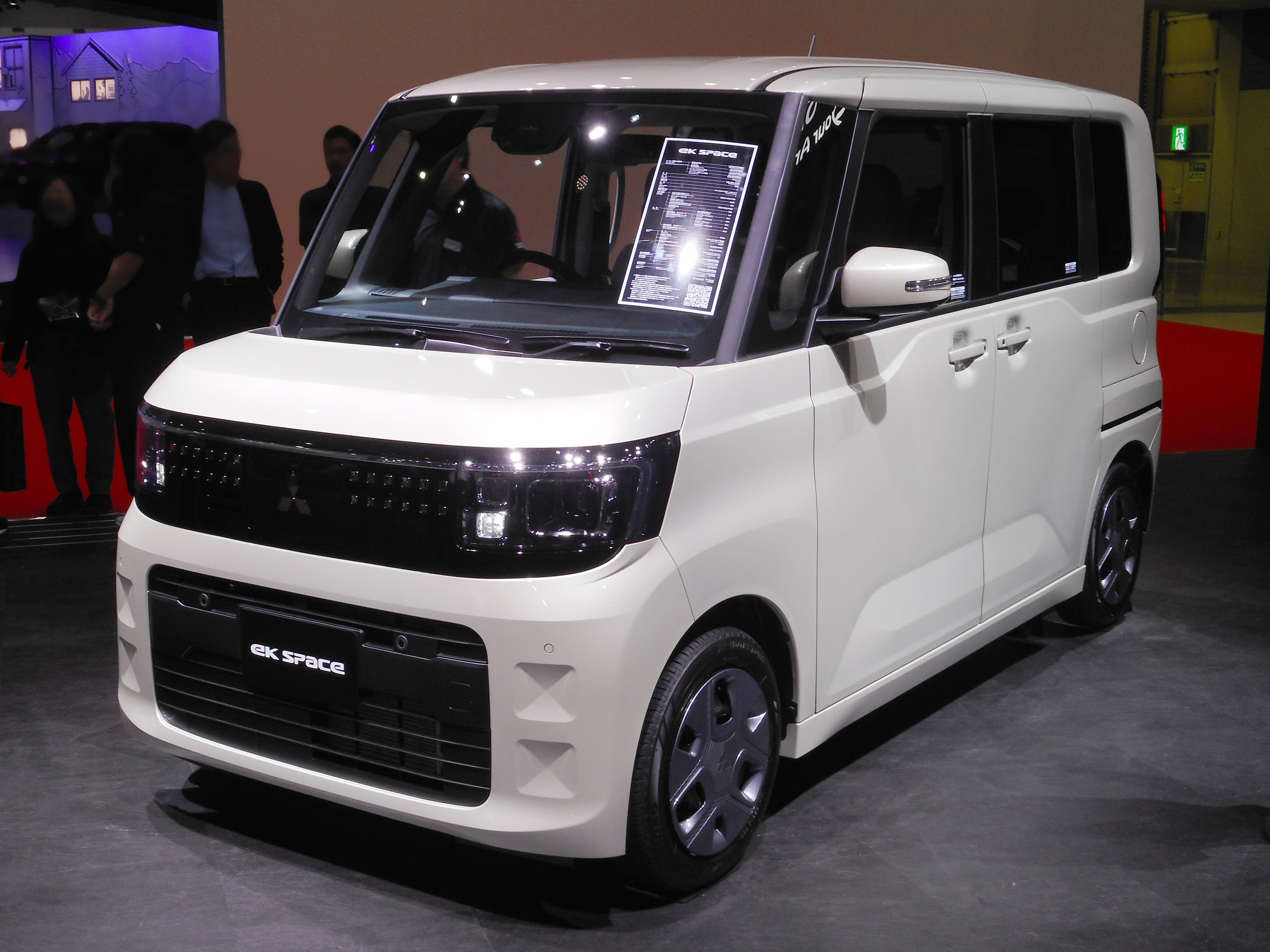

Overview
- Model code: BA1/BA5; BA2 (Roox); BB2/BB5/BB6 (Roox)
- Also called: Nissan Roox
- Production: August 2025 – present

Body and chassis
- Related: Mitsubishi Delica Mini (second generation)

Powertrain
- Engine: Petrol; 658 cc BR06DE I3; 658 cc BR06DET turbo I3 (Roox only)
- Electric motor: SM21 (MHEV)
- Transmission: CVT

Dimensions
- Length: 3,395 mm (133.7 in)
- Width: 1,475 mm (58.1 in)

The third-generation eK Space was unveiled on 22 August 2025, and the Roox was unveiled on 23 August 2025.

Mitsubishi eK Space

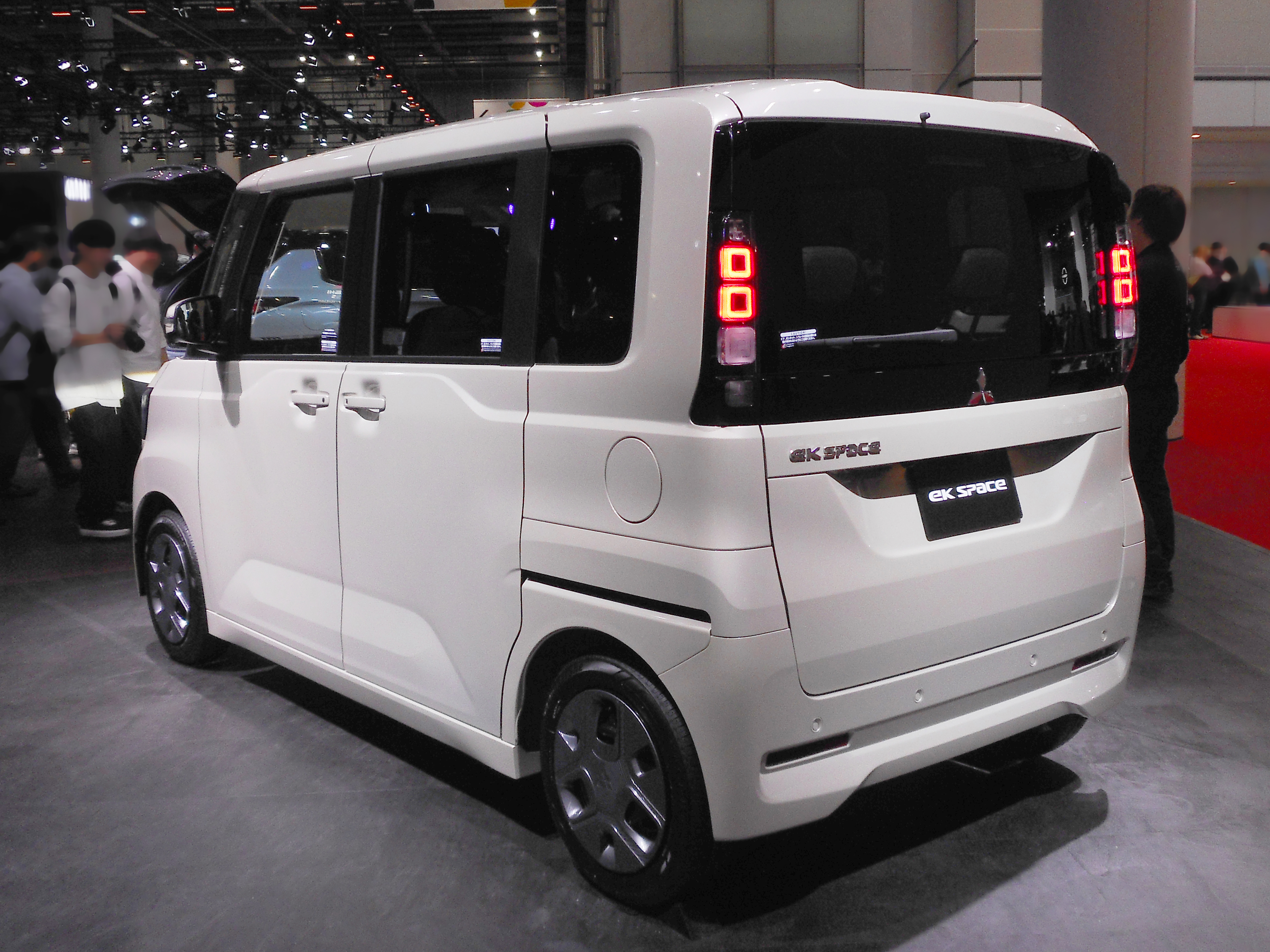
Rear view

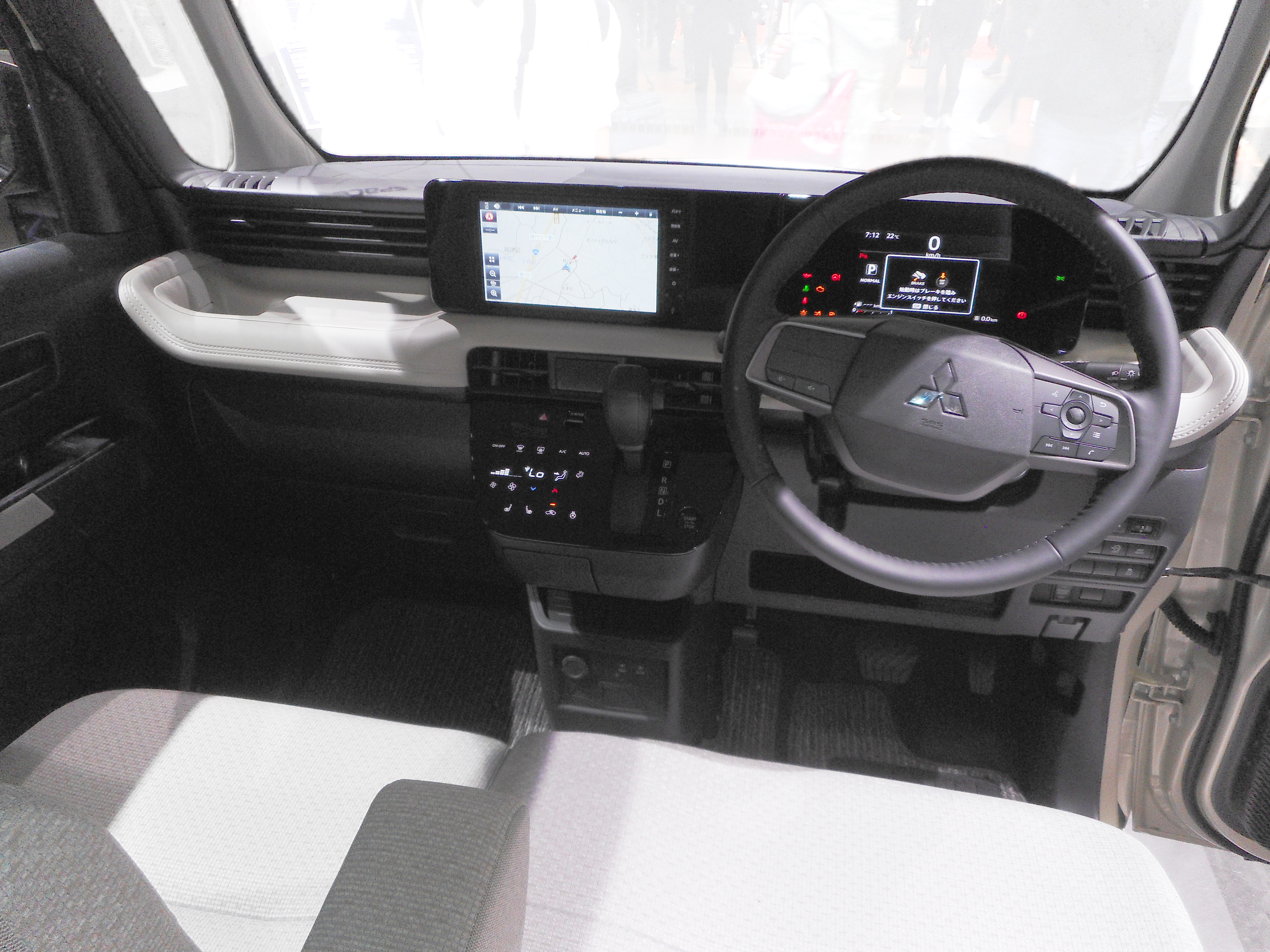
Interior

Nissan Roox

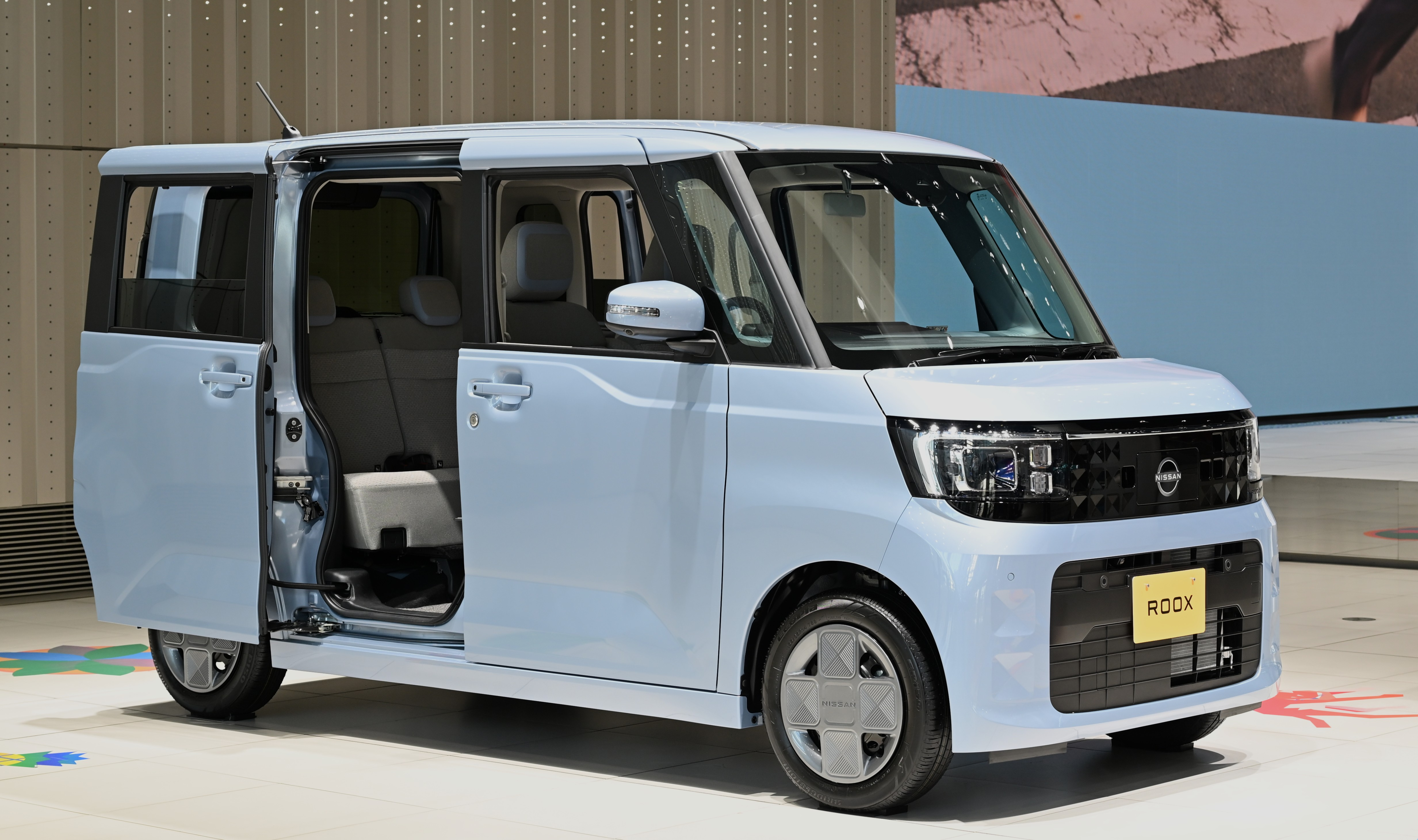
2025 Nissan Roox X (front)

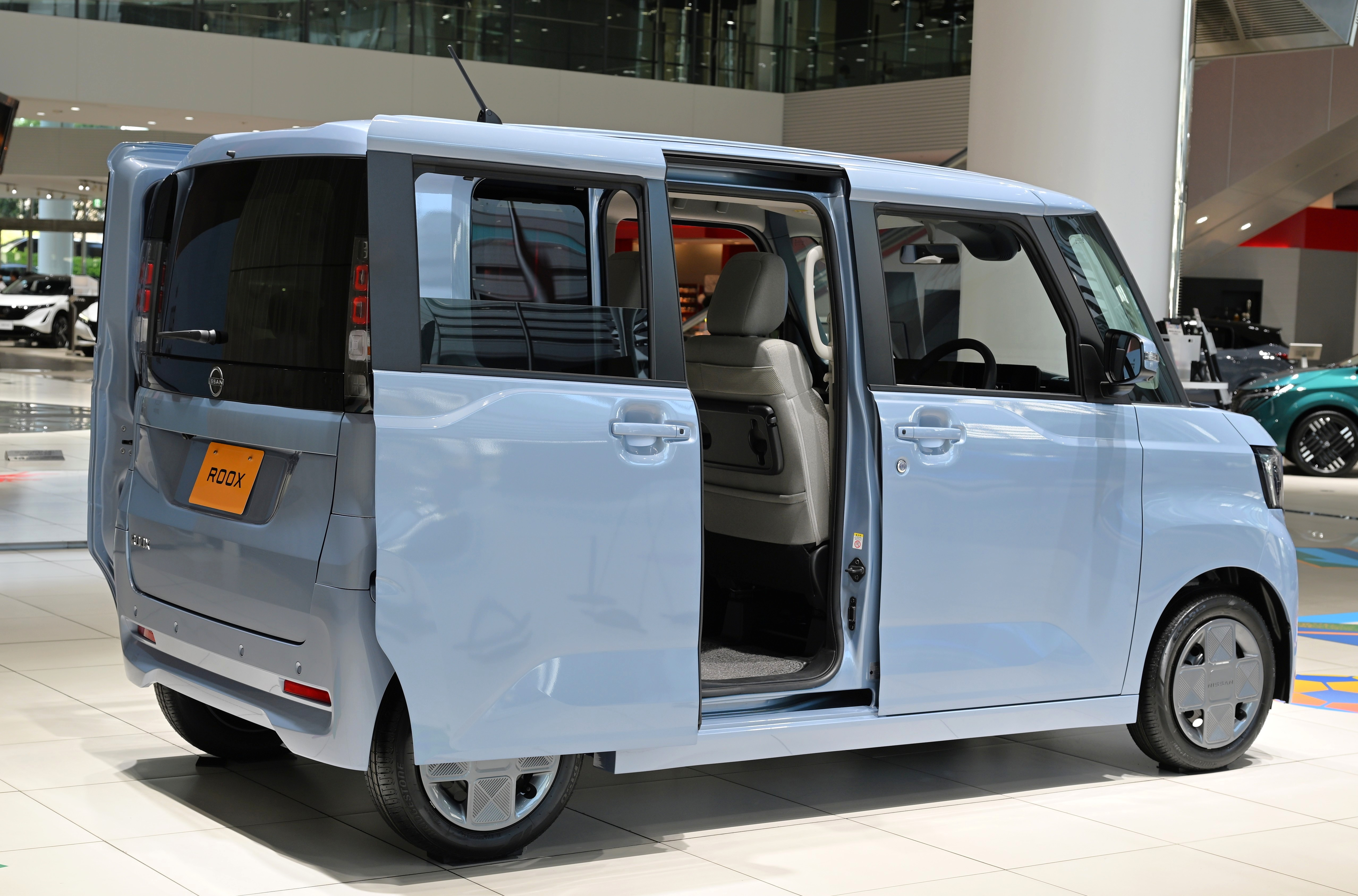
2025 Nissan Roox X (rear)

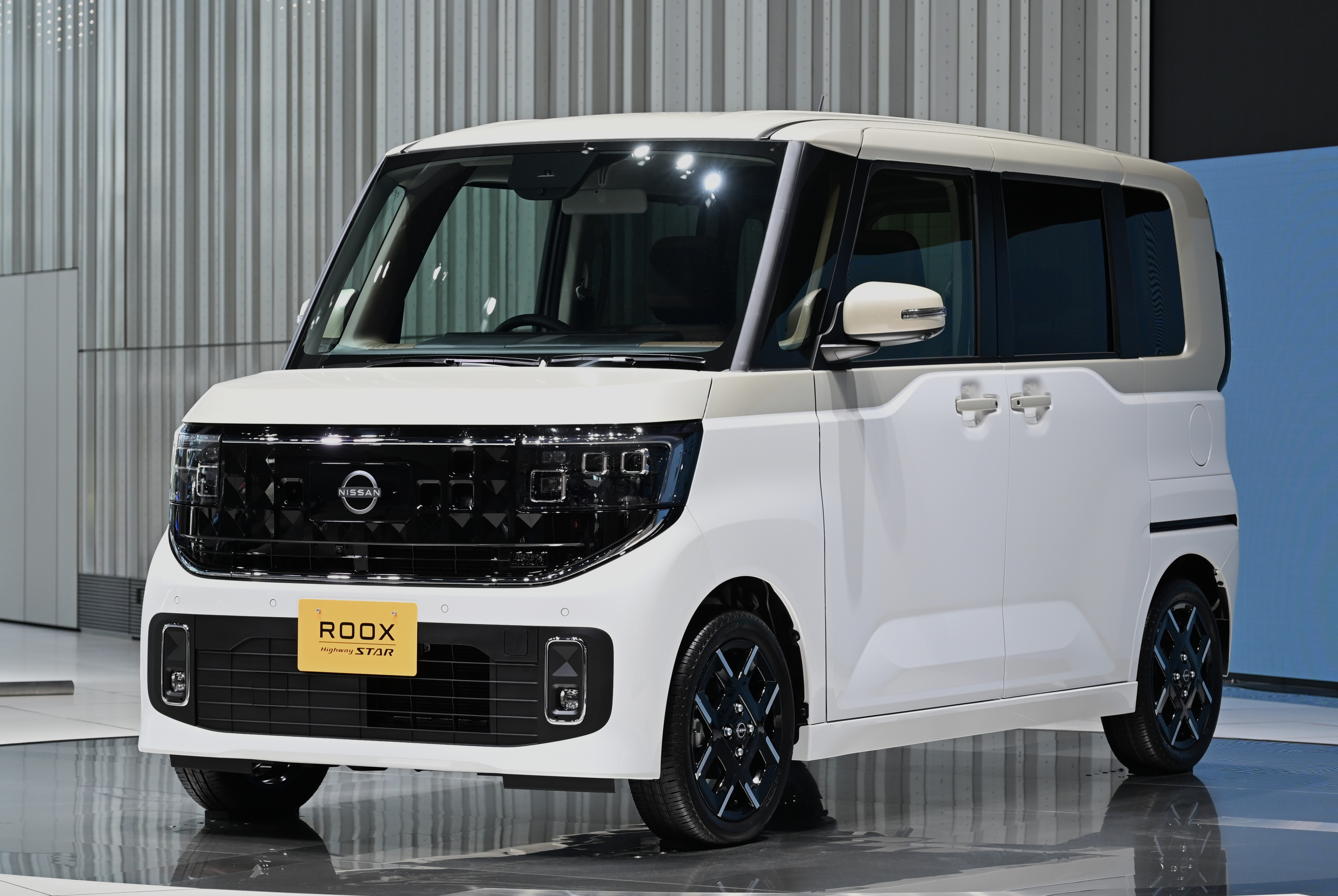
2025 Nissan Roox Highway Star (front)

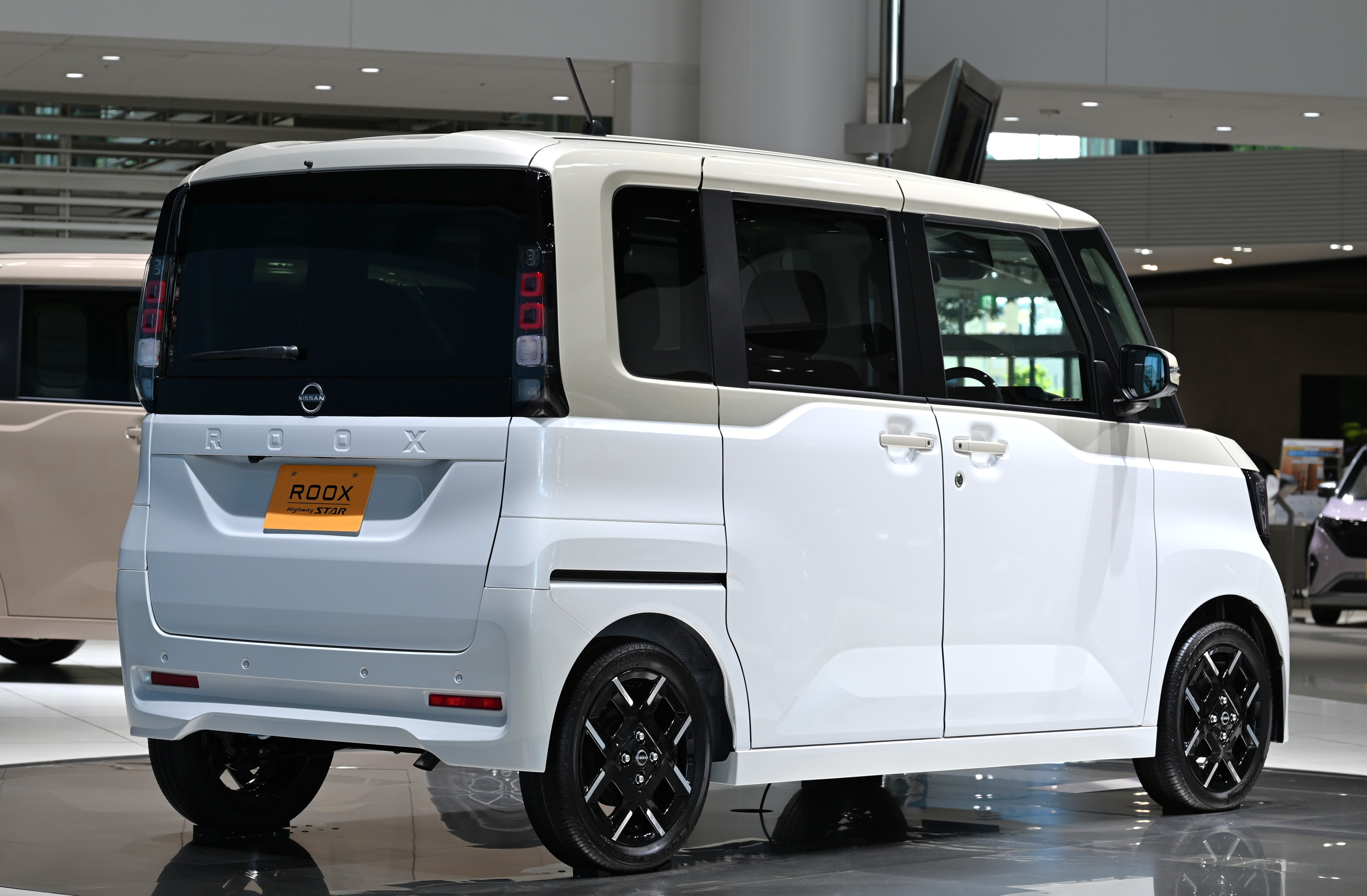
2025 Nissan Roox Highway Star (rear)

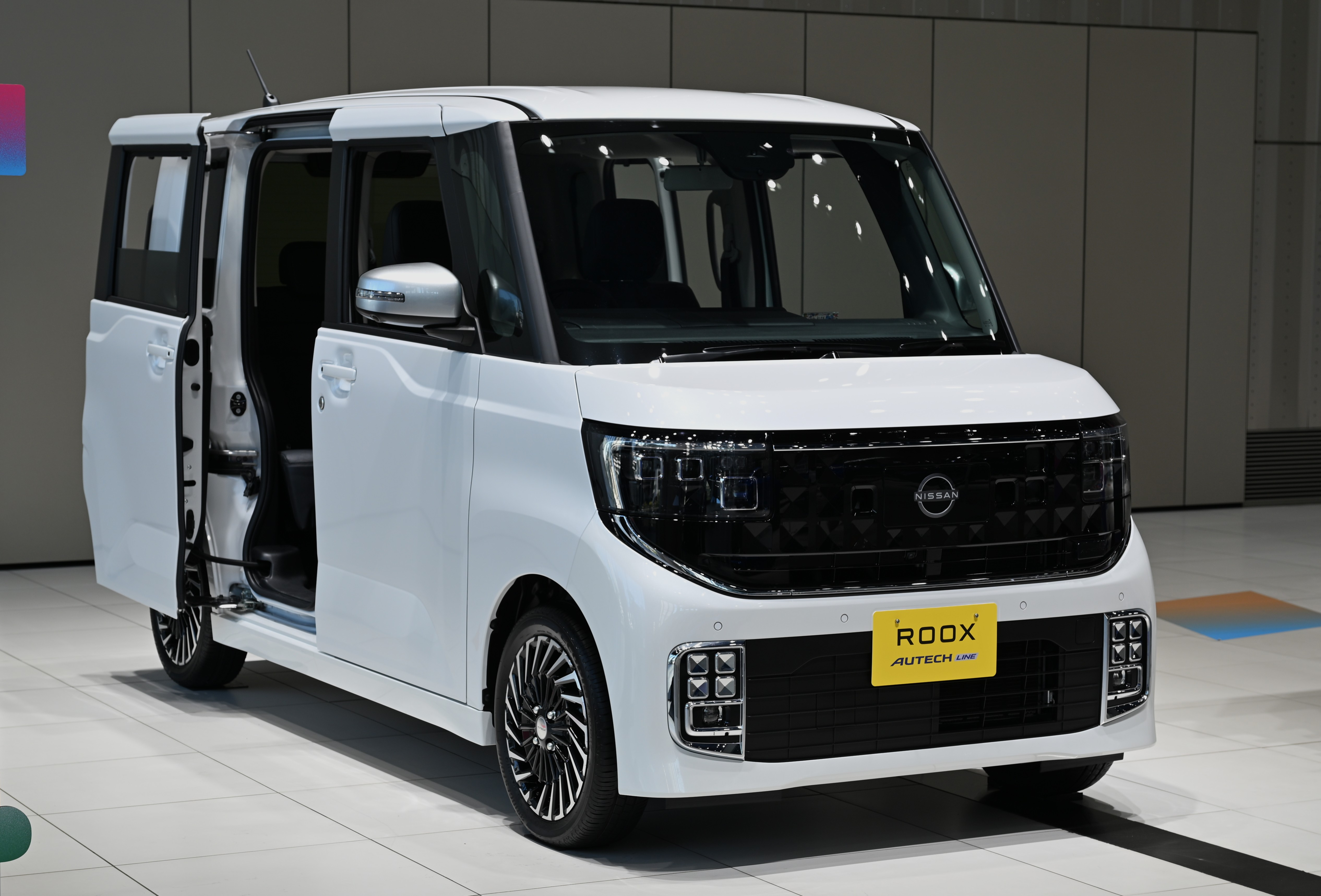
2025 Nissan Roox Autech (front)

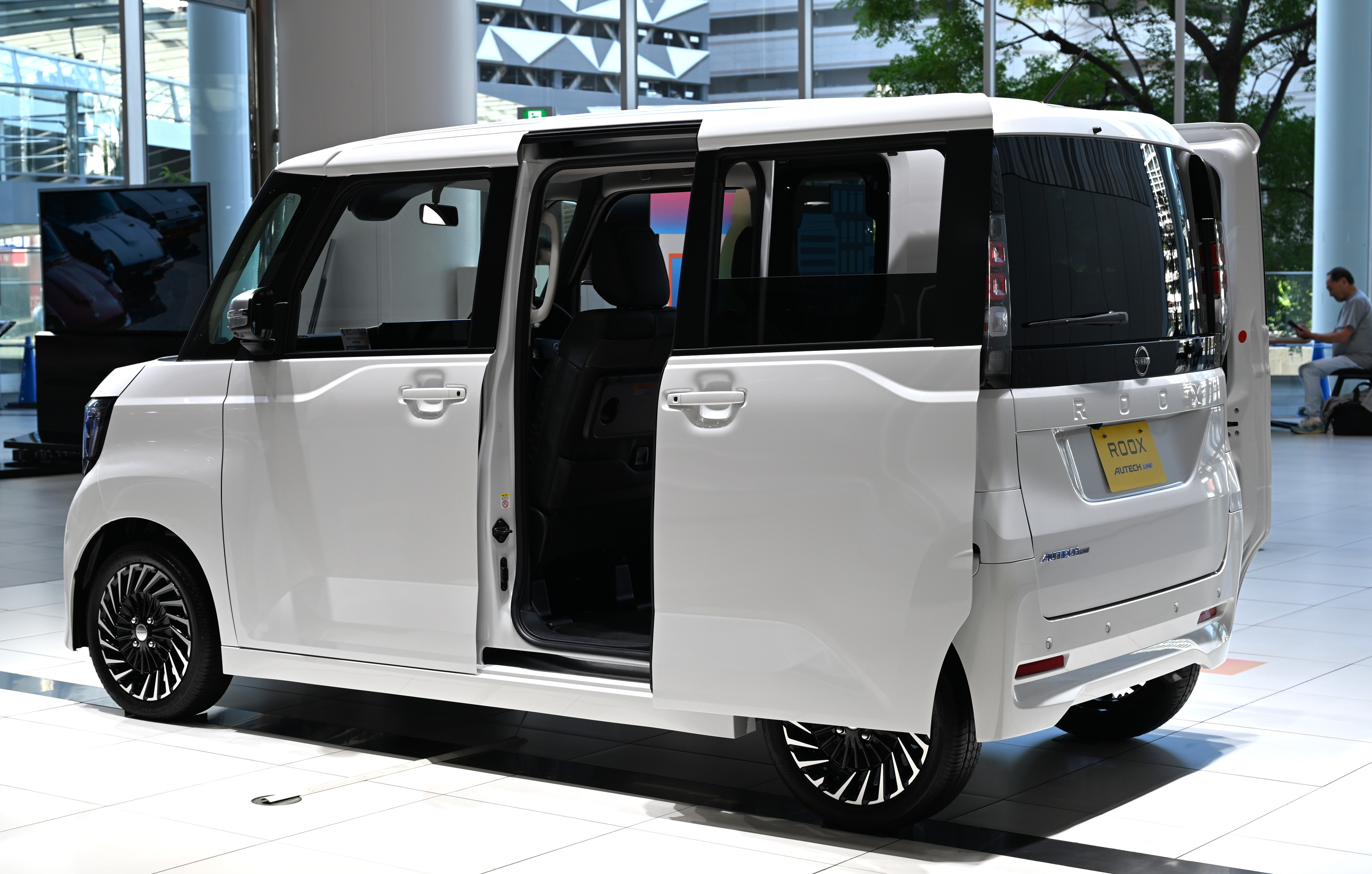
2025 Nissan Roox Autech (rear)

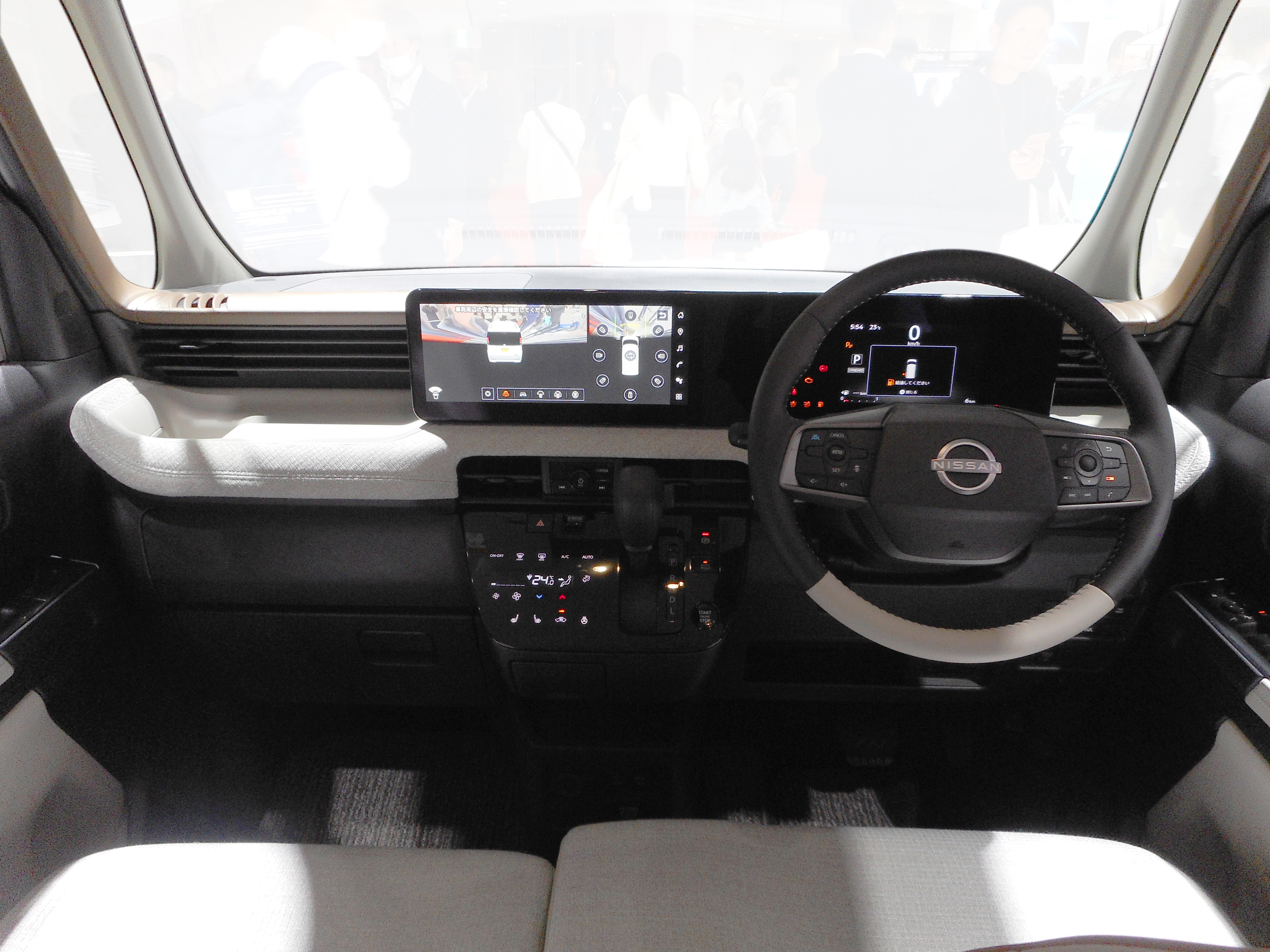
Interior

== Annual sales ==
| Year | Japan |
| Year | Nissan Dayz Roox/Roox |
|---|---|
| 2014 | 81,050 (Note: Total sales in the calendar year were 81,052, but two examples registered in January 2014 were of the previous, Suzuki Palette-based variant) |
| 2015 | 79,137 |
| 2016 | 54,398 |
| 2017 | 73,544 |
| 2018 | 77,590 |
| 2019 | 67,747 |
| 2020 | 84,188 |
| 2021 | 76,052 |
| 2022 | 72,600 |
| 2023 | 70,536 |
| 2024 | 70,697 |
