= Car of the Year Japan =

Annual Car of the Year award

The Car of the Year Japan Award (日本カー・オブ・ザ・イヤー (nihon kā obu za iyā)), also known as Japan Car of the Year (or JCOTY), is an annual Car of the Year award given for newly released or redesigned vehicles released in the car buying market in Japan in the twelve months beginning 1 November.

The award has been presented since 1980. The supervisory board is made up primarily of Japanese automotive journalists. The award is not associated with the more recent RJC Car of the Year, which has been issued by the Automotive Researchers' and Journalists’ Conference since 1992.

The current recipient of the award for 2024 to 2025 is the Honda Freed.

The first non-Japanese car to win the award was the Volkswagen Golf in 2013, followed by the Volvo XC60 in 2017 and the Volvo XC40 in 2018. The highest-placed car from the United States was the Jeep Cherokee, which was eliminated in the final round in 2014 and was placed eighth.

== Recipients ==
Car of the Year Japan
Year	Winner	Special Award
1980–1981	Mazda Familia	
1981–1982	Toyota Soarer	
1982–1983	Mazda Capella/Ford Telstar	
1983–1984	Honda Civic/Ballade	
1984–1985	Toyota MR2	
1985–1986	Honda Accord/Vigor	
1986–1987	Nissan Pulsar/EXA/Langley/Liberta Villa	
1987–1988	Mitsubishi Galant	
1988–1989	Nissan Silvia	
1989–1990	Toyota Celsior	
1990–1991	Mitsubishi Diamante	Toyota Estima
1991–1992	Honda Civic	Mitsubishi Pajero
1992–1993	Nissan March	Isuzu Bighorn
1993–1994	Honda Accord	Toyota Supra
1994–1995	Mitsubishi FTO	Honda Odyssey
1995–1996	Honda Civic	Nissan Terrano
1996–1997	Mitsubishi Galant/Legnum	Mazda Demio
1997–1998	Toyota Prius	Isuzu VehiCROSS
1998–1999	Toyota Altezza	Honda Z
1999–2000	Toyota Vitz/Platz/Fun Cargo	Honda S2000
2000–2001	Honda Civic/Stream	Subaru Impreza
2001–2002	Honda Fit	Toyota Estima Hybrid
2002–2003	Honda Accord	Nissan Fairlady Z (Most Fun); BMW 7 Series (Most Advanced Technology)
2003–2004	Subaru Legacy	Mazda RX-8 (Most Fun); Nissan Teana (Best Value); Jaguar XJ (Most Advanced Technology)
2004–2005	Honda Legend	BMW 1 Series (Most Fun); Mazda Verisa (Best Value); Honda Legend (Most Advanced Technology)
2005–2006	Mazda Roadster	Suzuki Swift (Most Fun); Honda Civic/Civic Hybrid (Most Advanced Technology)
2006–2007	Lexus LS460	Audi TT (Most Fun); Mitsubishi i (Most Advanced Technology); Honda Stream (Best Value)
2007–2008	Honda Fit	Mitsubishi Lancer Evolution X (Most Fun); Volkswagen Golf (Most Advanced Technology); Daihatsu Mira (Best Value)
2008–2009	Toyota iQ	Nissan GT-R (Most Advanced Technology); Subaru Exiga (Most Fun); Honda Freed (Best Value)
2009–2010	Toyota Prius	Mitsubishi i-MiEV (Most Advanced Technology); Nissan Fairlady Z (Most Fun); Subaru Legacy (Best Value); Honda Fit (Best Third Decade Car)
2010–2011	Honda CR-Z	Peugeot RCZ
2011–2012	Nissan Leaf	Mazda Demio
2012–2013	Mazda CX-5	Toyota 86/Subaru BRZ
2013–2014	Volkswagen Golf	Mitsubishi Outlander PHEV (Innovation); Mazda Atenza (Emotional); Suzuki Spacia/Mazda Flair Wagon (Small Mobility); Daihatsu Move Front Lift (Special Award)
2014–2015	Mazda Demio	BMW i3 (Innovation); Honda N-WGN (Small Mobility); Toyota’s approach to fuel cell vehicles (Special Award)
2015–2016	Mazda Roadster	Tesla Model S (Innovation); Suzuki Alto/Alto Lapin (Small Mobility); Yanase (Special Award); Toyota Mirai (Special Award)
2016–2017	Subaru Impreza	Nissan Serena (Innovation); BMW M2 (Emotional); Daihatsu Move Canbus (Small Mobility); Honda NSX (Special Award)
2017–2018	Volvo XC60	Toyota Prius PHV (Innovation); Lexus LC (Emotional); Honda N-Box (Small Mobility); Toyota (Special Award); Takuma Sato (Special Award)
2018–2019	Volvo XC40	Honda Clarity PHEV (Innovation); BMW X2 (Emotional); Daihatsu Mira Tocot (Small Mobility); Toyota Gazoo Racing (Special Award); Honda N-Van (Special Award)
2019–2020	Toyota RAV4	Nissan Skyline (Innovation); Jeep Wrangler (Emotional); Nissan Dayz and Mitsubishi eK X/eK Wagon (Small Mobility)
2020–2021	Subaru Levorg	Mazda MX-30 (Design); Audi e-tron Sportback (Technology); BMW Alpina B3 (Performance); Nissan Roox and Mitsubishi eK X Space/eK Space (K Car)
2021–2022	Nissan Note	BMW 4 Series (Design); Mitsubishi Outlander (Technology); Chevrolet Corvette (Performance); Honda N-One (K Car); Toyota Gazoo Racing (Special Award); Honda (Special Award)
2022–2023	Nissan Sakura/Mitsubishi eK X EV	BMW iX (Design); Nissan X-Trail (Technology); Honda Civic e:HEV/Type R (Performance); Nissan Sakura/Mitsubishi eK X EV (K Car)
2023–2024	Toyota Prius	Mitsubishi Delica Mini (Design); Nissan Serena (Technology); Japan Mobility Show (Special Award)
2024–2025	Honda Freed	Mitsubishi Triton (Design); Honda CR-V e:FCEV (Technology); Mazda e-Skyactiv R-EV (Special Award)
2025–2026	Subaru Forester	Volkswagen ID. Buzz (Design); Porsche 911 Carrera GTS (Technology); Porsche Experience Center Tokyo (Special Award)

Japan Import Car of the Year
Year	Winner
1994–1995	Mercedes-Benz C200
1995–1996	MG F
1996–1997	Mercedes-Benz SLK
1997–1998	Renault Mégane Scénic
1998–1999	Mercedes-Benz A-Class
1999–2000	Rover 75
2000–2001	Mercedes-Benz C-Class
2001–2002	Alfa Romeo 147
2002–2003	None
2003–2004	None
2004–2005	Volkswagen Golf
2005–2006	BMW 3 Series
2006–2007	Citroën C6
2007–2008	Mercedes-Benz C-Class
2008–2009	Citroën C5
2009–2010	Volkswagen Golf
2010–2011	Volkswagen Polo
2011–2012	Mercedes-Benz C-Class
2012–2013	BMW 3 Series
2013–2014	None
2014–2015	Mercedes-Benz C-Class
2015–2016	BMW 2 Series Active Tourer/Gran Tourer
2016–2017	Audi A4
2017–2018	None
2018–2019	None
2019–2020	BMW 3 Series
2020–2021	Peugeot 208/e-208
2021–2022	Volkswagen Golf
2022–2023	Hyundai Ioniq 5
2023–2024	BMW X1
2024–2025	Mini Cooper
2025–2026	Volkswagen ID. Buzz

== Most wins by manufacturer (Japanese car) ==
Total wins	Manufacturer
12	Honda
9	Toyota
6	Mazda
6	Nissan
5	Mitsubishi
4	Subaru
2	Volvo
1	Lexus
1	Volkswagen
1	Hyundai

== Most wins by manufacturer (Import car) ==
Total wins	Manufacturer
7	Mercedes-Benz
6	Volkswagen
5	BMW
2	Citroen
2	Volvo
1	MG F
1	Renault
1	Rover
1	Alfa Romeo
1	Audi
1	Peugeot
1	Hyundai
1	Mini

== See also ==
- List of motor vehicle awards
