= RJC Car of the Year =

The Automotive Researchers' and Journalists' Conference of Japan, also known as (RJC), is a non-profit organization established in 1990, consisting of Japan-based automotive critics and journalists.

The RJC holds a yearly conference, where they bestow awards regarding:

- Person of the Year (related to the automotive world)
- Technology of the Year
- Car of the Year (Japanese-made)
- Import Car of the Year (since 2001)

RJC Car of the Year is one of the prominent Japanese automobile awards, the other being Japan Car of the Year.

== Winners ==
Year	Person of the Year	Technology of the Year	Car of the Year	Import Car of the Year	Special Award
2027		Nissan e-Power (Elgrand / Kicks)	Suzuki e Sky	BYD Racco	Mitsubishi Delica D:5
2026		Subaru strong hybrid (Crosstrek / Forester)	Nissan Roox / Mitsubishi eK Space / Mitsubishi Delica Mini	BYD Sealion 7	Suzuki e Vitara
2025		BYD LFP Blade battery and CTB body structure (Seal)	Suzuki Swift	Mini Cooper	Mitsubishi Triton
2024		Nissan HR14DDe engine (Serena)	Nissan Serena	BMW X1	
2023		Nissan and Mitsubishi electrification technology for battery electric kei car (Sakura / eK X EV)	Nissan Sakura / Mitsubishi eK X EV	BMW 2 Series Active Tourer	
2022		Mitsubishi plug-in hybrid system with S-AWC (Eclipse Cross PHEV)	Nissan Note / Note Aura	BMW 4 Series	
2021		Nissan e-Power (Kicks)	Toyota Yaris / Yaris Cross	BMW 2 Series Gran Coupé	
2020		Nissan ProPilot 2.0 (Skyline)	Nissan Dayz / Mitsubishi eK Wagon / eK X	BMW 3 Series	CHAdeMO
2019		Nissan e-Power (Serena)	Mitsubishi Eclipse Cross	BMW X2	Honda N-Van
2018	光岡進 (Susumu Mitsuoka, Chairman, Mitsuoka)	Honda weight reduction technology (N-Box)	Suzuki Swift	Volvo V90	Mazda Roadster restoration service / Classic Volvo Refresh Project
2017		Nissan ProPilot (Serena)	Nissan Serena	Volvo XC90	
2016		Toyota Fuel Cell System (TFCS) (Mirai)	Suzuki Alto / Alto Lapin	Mini Clubman	
2015		Nissan Direct Adaptive Steering (Skyline)	Suzuki Hustler	Mercedes-Benz C-Class	JAMA Kei car
2014	菅原義正 (Yoshimasa Sugawara, Rally Driver)	Mitsubishi plug-in hybrid system (Outlander PHEV)	Mazda Atenza	Volvo V40	
2013		Suzuki Green Technology (Wagon R)	Nissan Note	BMW 3 Series / Volkswagen Up!	Mitsubishi Fuso Duonic (Canter Eco Hybrid)
2012		Mazda SkyActiv-G 1.3 liter engine (Demio)	Nissan Leaf	Volvo S60 / V60	
2011		Subaru EyeSight (Legacy)	Suzuki Swift	Volkswagen Polo	
2010		Mazda i-Stop (Axela)	Honda Insight	Audi Q5	
2009		Volkswagen 1.4 liter TSI engine with 7-speed DSG (Golf)	Suzuki Wagon R	Audi A4	Mitsubishi Lancer Evolution X (Best High-Performance & Sports Car)
2008		Volkswagen TSI engine (Golf Variant)	Mazda Demio	Peugeot 207	Mazda CX-7 (Best SUV)
2007	津田紘 (Hiroshi Tsuda, President, Suzuki)	Mercedes-Benz 3.0 liter V6 common rail diesel turbo engine	Mitsubishi i	Mercedes-Benz E 320 CDI	Daihatsu Move (Best Kei Car)
2006	井巻久一 (Hisakazu Imaki, President, Mazda)	Honda 3-stage i-VTEC + IMA (Civic Hybrid)	Suzuki Swift	Citroën C4	
2005		Honda SH-AWD (Legend)	Nissan Fuga	Audi A6	Subaru R2 (Best Kei Car)
2004	Henry Ford	Mazda Renesis engine (RX-8)	Mazda RX-8	Audi A3	Volkswagen Touareg (Best SUV)
2003		BMW Valvetronic	Mazda Atenza	Citroën C3	Subaru Forester
2002	吉野浩行 (Hiroyuki Yoshino, President, Honda)	Toyota THS-C + E-Four hybrid (Estima Hybrid)	Honda Fit	Audi A4	Mazda RX-7 R-Spec (Advanced Design)
2001	石原慎太郎 (Shintarō Ishihara, Governor of Tokyo)	Nissan NEO QG18DE engine (Bluebird Sylphy)	Honda Civic / Civic Ferio	Volkswagen Golf	Cadillac Night Vision (DeVille DHS, Technology); Mazda MPV (Best Minivan)
2000	新宮威一 (Iichi Shingu, President, Daihatsu)	Nissan Extroid CVT (Cedric / Gloria)	Nissan Cedric / Gloria	Peugeot 206	
1999	海崎洋一郎 (Yoichiro Kaizaki, President, Bridgestone)	Isuzu common rail type direct injection diesel engine (Bighorn)	Subaru Legacy / Legacy Lancaster (Registered car); Subaru Pleo (Kei car)	BMW 3 Series	
1998		Toyota Hybrid System (THS) (Prius)	Toyota Prius	Volkswagen Passat	
1997	川本信彦 (Nobuhiko Kawamoto, President, Honda)	Mitsubishi GDI engine (Galant / Legnum)	Mazda Demio / Ford Festiva Mini Wagon	Volkswagen Polo	
1996	梁瀨次郎 (Jiro Yanase, CEO, Yanase)	Toyota VSC (Crown Royal / Crown Majesta)	Toyota Crown Royal / Crown Majesta	Mercedes-Benz E-Class	
1995	豐田英二 (Eiji Toyoda, Chairman, Toyota)	Mitsubishi INVECS-II + Sport Mode AT (FTO)	Honda Odyssey	Opel Omega	
1994	鈴木修 (Osamu Suzuki, President, Suzuki)	Mazda Miller cycle engine (Eunos 800)	Suzuki Wagon R	Saab 900	
1993	鈴木元雄 (Motoo Suzuki, President, Mitsubishi)	Mitsubishi INVECS (Galant / Eterna)	Nissan March	Volvo 850	
1992	山本健一 (Kenichi Yamamoto, President, Mazda)	Honda VTEC engine	Mazda RX-7	BMW 3 Series	本田宗一郎 (Soichiro Honda, Supreme Advisor, Honda)

== See also ==
- List of motor vehicle awards
- International Engine of the Year
- PACE Award
- Progressive Insurance Automotive X Prize
- Ward's 10 Best Engines
