= List of Mitsubishi Motors vehicles =

This is a list of vehicles sold by Mitsubishi Motors.

== Current models ==
Body style	Model			Current model			Vehicle description
Body style	Image	Name(s)	Introduction (cal. year)	Introduction (cal. year)	Update/facelift	Main markets	Vehicle description
Hatchback		Mirage / Space Star	1978 (Mirage nameplate)	2012 (reintroduced)	2019	Global (except North America)	Subcompact B-segment hatchback or supermini.
Sedan		Mirage G4 / Attrage	1978 (Mirage nameplate)	2013 (reintroduced)	2026	Global (except Europe and U.S. and Canada)	Sedan version of the Mirage/Space Star.
Station wagon		Colt Plus	2004 (nameplate introduction) 2007 (Taiwan)	2007	2017	Taiwan	B-segment station wagon version of the Colt (2002-2013). Assembled by China Motor Corporation (CMC) in Taiwan.
Crossover SUV		ASX / RVR / Outlander Sport	2010	2010	2019	Global	Subcompact crossover SUV.
Crossover SUV		ASX	2010	2022	2024	Europe, Australia	Subcompact crossover SUV. Hybrid available. Rebadged Renault Captur. PHEV was available from 2022 until 2024.
Crossover SUV		ASX VR-e	2026	2026	—	Australia	Subcompact crossover SUV. Battery electric standard. Rebadged Foxtron Bria.
Crossover SUV		Destinator	2025	2025	—	Southeast Asia and others	Three-row compact crossover SUV primarily marketed in Southeast Asia and emerging markets.
Crossover SUV		Eclipse Cross	2017	2017	2020	Global	Two-row compact crossover SUV. PHEV available.
Crossover SUV		Eclipse Cross EV	2017	2025	—	Europe	Compact crossover SUV. Battery electric standard. Rebadged Renault Scenic E-Tech.
Crossover SUV		Eclipse Sportback	2026	2026	—	North America	Subcompact crossover SUV. Battery electric standard. Rebadged Nissan Leaf.
Crossover SUV		Grandis	2003 (Grandis nameplate); 2025 (as an SUV)	2025	—	Europe	Compact crossover SUV. Hybrid available and Mild Hybrid Electric. Rebadged Renault Symbioz.
Crossover SUV		Outlander	2001 (Airtrek nameplate) 2003 (Outlander nameplate)	2021	2024	Global	Two/three-row compact crossover SUV. PHEV available.
Crossover SUV		Xforce / Outlander Sport	2023	2023	—	Southeast Asia and others	Subcompact crossover SUV primarily marketed in Southeast Asia and emerging markets. Hybrid available
Body-on-frame SUV		Pajero Sport / Montero Sport	1996	2015	2024	Global (except North America and Japan)	Mid-size SUV. Based on Triton/L200/Strada pickup truck. Was marketed in the U.K. as Shogun Sport from 2000 until 2005 and from 2018 until 2020.
Body-on-frame SUV		Pajero / Montero	1981	2026 (reintroduced)	—	Global (except North America and Europe)	Full-size SUV. Chassis shared with the Triton/L200 pickup truck.
MPV/ minivan		Delica D:2	2011	2021	2025	Japan	Mild hybrid mini MPV with sliding rear doors for the Japanese market. Rebadged Suzuki Solio.
MPV/ minivan		Delica D:5	1968 (original model)	2007	2025	Japan	Minivan/MPV primarily for the Japanese market. Previously also sold in Indonesia and Thailand.
MPV/ minivan		Delica (Taiwan)	1968 (nameplate introduction) 1991 (Taiwan)	1986 (Global) 1991 (Taiwan)	2019	Taiwan	Rear-wheel drive, Cargo and Passenger Van. Available in Pickup form. Assembled by China Motor Corporation (CMC) in Taiwan.
MPV/ minivan		Xpander	2017	2017	2025	Southeast Asia and others	Three-row compact MPV for the Indonesian and emerging markets. Hybrid available.
MPV/ minivan		Xpander Cross	2019	2019	2025	Southeast Asia and others	Crossover-styled version of the Xpander MPV. Hybrid available.
Kei car		Delica Mini	2023	2025	—	Japan	Kei car with sliding doors. Successor of the eK X Space.
Kei car		eK Space	2014	2025	—	Japan	Kei car with sliding doors. Jointly developed with Nissan through NMKV.
Kei car		eK Wagon	2001	2019	—	Japan	Hatchback kei car with hinged rear doors. Crossover-styled version known as the eK X. Jointly developed with Nissan through NMKV.
Kei car		eK X EV	2022	2022	2026	Japan	Battery-electric variant of eK X kei car. Jointly developed with Nissan through NMKV.
Kei car		Town Box	1999	2014	2026	Japan	Tall height kei car with rear sliding doors. Rebadged Suzuki Every Wagon.

=== Commercial vehicles ===
Body style	Model			Current model			Vehicle description
Body style	Image	Name(s)	Introduction (cal. year)	Introduction (cal. year)	Update/facelift	Main markets	Vehicle description
Pickup truck		L200/Triton	1978 (L200 nameplate) 1986 (Triton nameplate)	2023	—	Global (except North America)	Mid-size pickup truck.
Van		Minicab EV / L100	2011	2011 2022 (reintroduction)	2023	Japan, Indonesia	Battery-electric Mid-engined cab over kei car. Formerly called Minicab MiEV until 2023. Marketed in Indonesia as the L100.
Van		Minicab Van	1966	2013	2026	Japan	Kei van with sliding rear doors. Rebadged Suzuki Every.
Van		Versa Van	1987	2026	—	Philippines	Cab over van. Rebadged Nissan Caravan/Urvan.
Cab-chassis truck		Minicab Truck	1966	2013	2026	Japan	Kei-truck version of the rebadged Suzuki Carry.
Cab-chassis truck		Delica	1968	1986	2019	Taiwan	Cab-chassis version of the Cargo and Passenger Van. Assembled by China Motor Corporation (CMC) in Taiwan.
Cab-chassis truck		L300 / Colt L300	1979	1979	2022	Indonesia, Philippines	Cab-chassis van based on the second generation Delica.

== Former models ==
Image	Model	Introduced	Discontinued	Reintroduced	Re-discontinued	Notes
	380	2005	2008			Version of Galant in Australia and New Zealand
	3000GT	1991	1999			
	500	1960	1962			
	Airtrek	2021	2023			an electric vehicle
	Aspire	1998	2003			Sister car of the facelifted Galant for Japanese market
	Carisma	1995	2004			
	Chariot	1983	2003			
	Colt	1978	2014	2023	2025	Rebadged Mitsubishi Mirage and Mitsubishi Lancer (1978–2002) and Renault Clio V (2023–2025)
	Colt 1000/1100/1200/1500	1962	1970			
	Cordia	1982	1990			
	Debonair	1964	1999			2nd-3rd rebadged Hyundai Grandeur
	Delica D:3/Delica Van	2011	2019			rebadged Nissan NV200
	Diamante	1990	2005			
	Dignity/Proudia	1999	2001	2012	2016	1st-gen rebadged Hyundai Equus; 2nd-gen rebadged Nissan Cima/Fuga
	Dion	2000	2005			
	Eclipse	1989	2011			
	Emeraude	1992	1996			A hardtop-sedan based on Galant
	Endeavor	2003	2011			
	Express	1986	2013	2020	2022	rebadged Renault Trafic (3rd)
	Freeca	1997	2017			
	FTO	1993	1998			
	Galant	1969	2012			
	Galant FTO	1971	1975			
	Galant GTO	1970	1977			
	Galant Lambda	1976	1984			
	Grandis (minivan)	2003	2011			
	Grand Lancer	2017	2024			Version of tenth generation Lancer for Taiwan
	i	2006	2013			
	i-MiEV	2009	2021			Electric version of i
	Lancer	1973	2019			
	Lancer Evolution	1992	2016			
	Magna	1985	2005			
	Maven	2005	2009			rebadged Suzuki APV
	Minica	1962	2007 (2011 for commercial models)			
	Mirage Dingo	1998	2003			
	Model A	1917	1921			
	Pajero iO	1998	2015			
	Pajero Junior	1995	1998			
	Pajero Mini	1994	2012			
	Pistachio	1999	1999			
	Raider	2005	2009			
	RVR	1991	2002			
	Sapporo	1978	1984	1987	1990	rebadged Galant
	Savrin	2001	2014			
	Sigma	1976	1996			
	Space Star	1998	2005			
	Starion	1982	1989			
	Toppo	1990	2004	2008	2013	Also called the Minica Toppo in first and second generation
	Tredia	1982	1990			
