= BYD Racco =

Kei car produced by BYD Auto

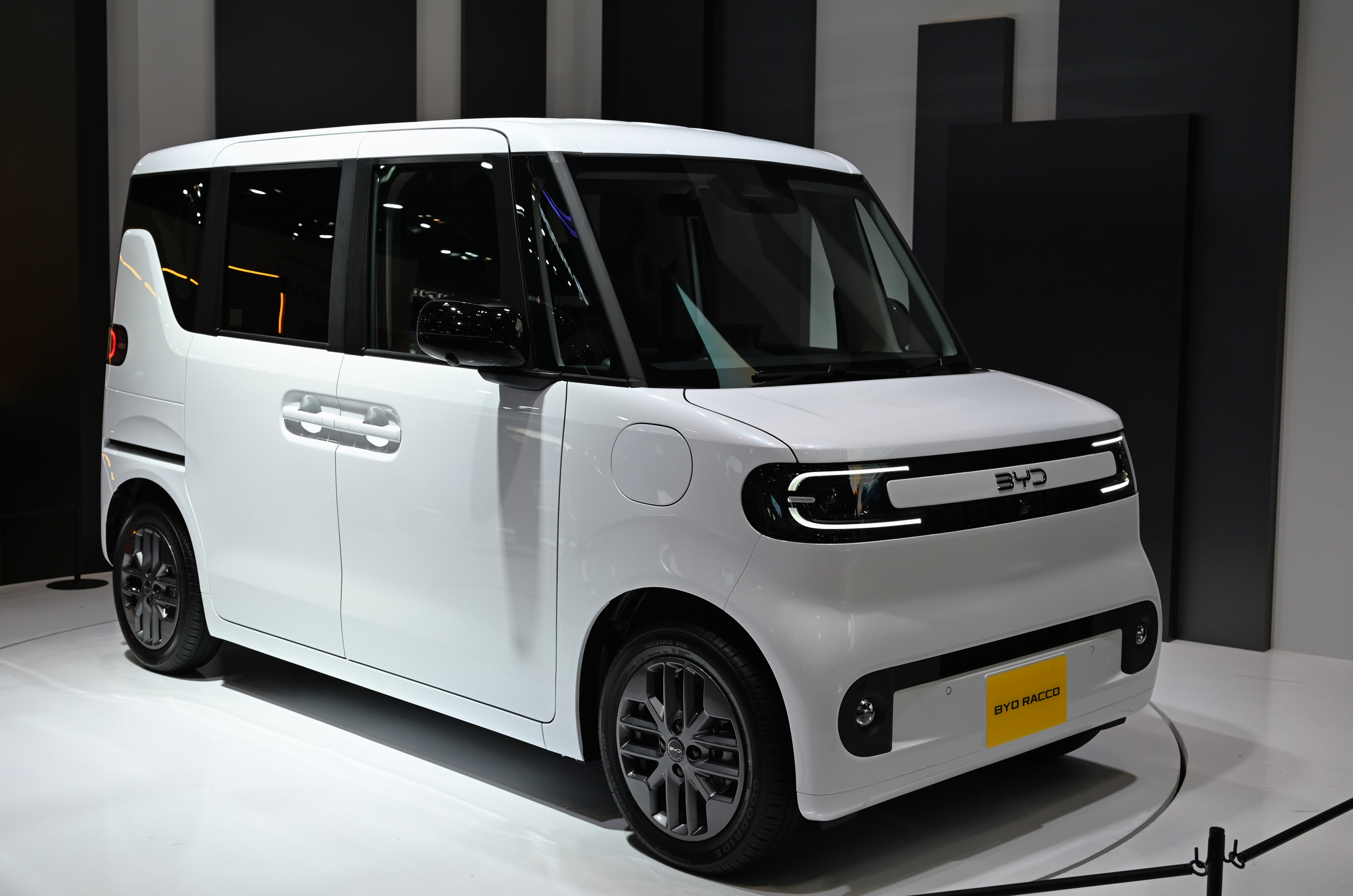

Overview
- Manufacturer: BYD Auto
- Production: 2026–present
- Assembly: China: Changzhou, Jiangsu
- Designer: Under the lead of Wolfgang Egger

Body and chassis
- Class: Kei car
- Body style: 5-door microvan
- Layout: Front-motor, front-wheel-drive
- Platform: X-Pack

Powertrain
- Electric motor: BYD 1×TZ180XSAB permanent magnet synchronous
- Power output: 47 kW (64 PS; 63 hp)
- Battery: 22.4 kWh LFP BYD Blade; 35.84 kWh LFP BYD Blade
- Electric range: 210–320 km (130–200 mi) (WLTP)
- Plug-in charging: 6 kW (AC); 38–49 kW (DC)

Dimensions
- Wheelbase: 2,520 mm (99.2 in)
- Length: 3,395 mm (133.7 in)
- Width: 1,475 mm (58.1 in)
- Height: 1,800 mm (70.9 in)
- Kerb weight: 1,160–1,230 kg (2,557–2,712 lb)

The BYD Racco (Japanese: BYDラッコ, Hepburn: BYD Rakko; lit. 'sea otter') is a battery electric kei car manufactured by BYD Auto in 2026 for the Japanese market. It is the carmaker's attempt to making an electric kei car for the Japanese market and also the first and only one dedicated pure kei car model from a non-Japanese brand. (Note: Previously, several foreign-manufactured cars compliant with Japanese kei regulations were marketed in Japan; however, these were actually modified versions of pre-existing models, rather than purpose-built designs. Between 2001 and 2004, Yanase marketed a modified version of the Smart Fortwo that complied with kei car regulations (marketed as "Smart K"). The conversion was undertaken independently by Yanase without the involvement of Daimler. Since 2013, Caterham Cars has marketed several Caterham Seven variants developed specifically to meet kei car regulations. In 2021, Caterham was acquired by its Japanese importer.) It was revealed at the 2025 Japan Mobility Show, and has been made in China for export to Japan since July 2026.

While designed as a tall-roof kei car with sliding doors, mimicking the body styles of petrol-powered competitors such as the Honda N-Box, Daihatsu Tanto and Nissan Roox, the Racco competes with existing battery electric kei cars such as the Honda N-One e, Mitsubishi eK X EV, and Nissan Sakura.

== Overview ==
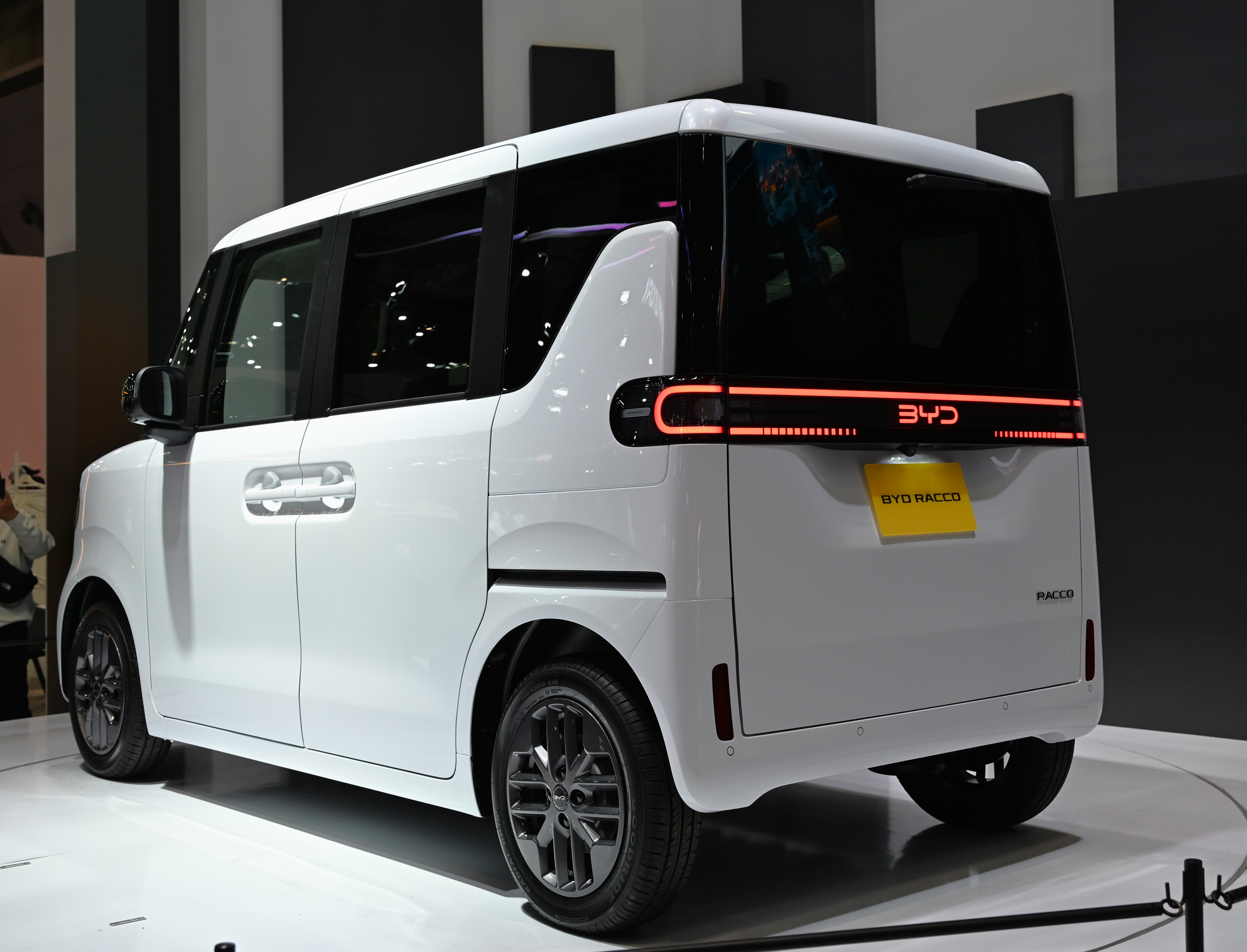
Rear view

The Racco went on sale in Japan on 28 July 2026. Two battery options are available, which are a 22.4 kWh and a 35.84 kWh lithium iron phosphate BYD Blade battery. The Racco rides on a purpose-built platform. The Racco's chassis uses a cell-to-body structural battery pack.

The Racco is available with kick-activated power sliding doors, NFC smartphone key, V2L capability, and 15-inch wheels. The interior features a 10.1-inch central infotainment touchscreen with CarPlay and Android Auto support and an array of physical button controls, heated front seats and steering wheel, and heated cupholder. The Racco is also equipped with six airbags, Level 2 ADAS system, tire pressure monitoring system, and battery preconditioning, and has a 1,372-litre (48.5 cu ft) rear cargo area with the rear seats folded down.

The Racco is the first battery electric kei car to feature power sliding doors, and is the first battery electric kei car to have a range exceeding 300 km (186 mi).

The BYD Racco was launched in Sri Lanka on 9 October 2026 and pre-booking in Macau on late 2026, with first international expansion outside of Japanese market.

== Powertrain ==
The Racco is available exclusively with a battery electric powertrain. All variants are equipped with a permanent magnet synchronous front motor outputting 63 hp (47 kW; 64 PS) (34 hp (25 kW; 34 PS) rated power) and 160 N⋅m (118 lb⋅ft) of torque. The base 200 variant is equipped with a 22.4 kWh LFP battery pack which provides 210 km (130 mi) of WLTP range. The 300 variant is equipped with a 35.48 kWh LFP battery which provides 320 km (199 mi) of WLTP range.

Specifications
Battery	Power	Torque	Range	Charging	0–50 km/h (31 mph)	Kerb weight
Battery	Power	Torque	WLTP	Peak DC	0–50 km/h (31 mph)	Kerb weight
22.4 kWh LFP BYD Blade	63 hp (47 kW; 64 PS)	160 N⋅m (118 lb⋅ft)	210 km (130 mi)	35.8 kW	4.2 sec	1,160 kg (2,557 lb)
35.84 kWh LFP BYD Blade	63 hp (47 kW; 64 PS)	160 N⋅m (118 lb⋅ft)	320 km (199 mi)	49.7 kW	4.4 sec	1,220 kg (2,690 lb)

== Sales ==
The Racco received over 1,000 orders within 2 weeks of its launch on 28 July 2026, of which 80% were for the top trim and 94% were for the larger battery variant. In the first two months after its launch, 1,832 Raccos were sold, of which 85% were for the highest end model.

== See also ==
- List of BYD Auto vehicles
