= NMKV =

Japanese automotive joint venture company

NMKV Co., Ltd.
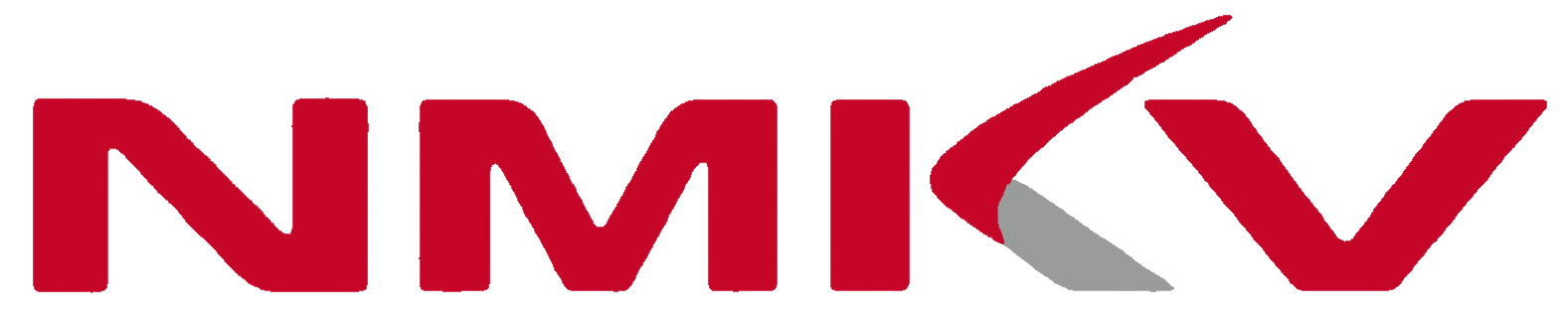
- Native name: 株式会社NMKV
- Romanized name: NMKV Kabushiki-gaisha
- Industry: Automotive
- Founded: 1 June 2011; 15 years ago
- Headquarters: Atsugi-shi, Kanagawa,
- Area served: Japan
- Key people: Tatsuzo Tomita (President and CEO); Toshiyuki Fujikura (Vice President and COO)
- Products: Automobiles
- Brands: Nissan; Mitsubishi
- Net income: ¥15,975 million (FY2024)
- Total assets: ¥341,072 million (FY2024)
- Owner: Nissan (50%); Mitsubishi Motors (50%)
- Number of employees: 54 (2025)
- Website: nmkv.com

NMKV Co., Ltd. is a joint venture company between Nissan Motor Co., Ltd. and Mitsubishi Motors in the Japanese market to design, develop, and manufacture kei cars under Nissan and Mitsubishi brands. The company currently produces Mitsubishi eK, Nissan Dayz, Mitsubishi eK Space and Nissan Roox for the domestic market.

== Overview ==
Nissan Motor Co., Ltd. and Mitsubishi Motors Co., Ltd. agreed to expand its business cooperation on 14 December 2010 from OEM supply to a joint venture. As part of that project, a formal contract was made on 20 May 2011 for the establishment of the company, and NMKV was established on 1 June 2011.

Nissan is in charge of parts procurement, planning and design, while Mitsubishi is in charge of manufacturing and development. The goal of the company is to increase the market share of Nissan and Mitsubishi in the kei car segment, which was about 15% at the time of company establishment to the target of 20%.

At the time of the establishment of NMKV, Nissan developed a successor of the Mitsubishi eK that was rebadged as Nissan Otti and planned to release it in the first half of 2013. The engine was newly developed. On 6 March 2013, the first jointly developed car, the third generation eK and the first generation Dayz was announced, and sales began in June of the same year.

The joint venture on the development of the third generation eK and Dayz has reduced costs by 30% compared to the predecessor model by procuring parts from outside Japan. In terms of vehicle design, one design proposal would include both Mitsubishi and Nissan front fascia designs. In addition, based on Mitsubishi's original engine 3B20 engine, Nissan's technology was utilized to improve the compression ratio to 12:1 with regular gasoline specification. While the body panels are common parts, the several panels and bumpers are made differently. For joint development, Mitsubishi provided engines, manufacturing plants and development facilities to reduce costs, and Nissan provided safety equipment technologies that Mitsubishi does not have. In addition, the cost of procurement has been reduced for the Nissan side compared to the conventional OEM agreement (rebadge), and the fact that NMKV joint venture also solved the problem that Mitsubishi Motors could not generate the development cost alone. In June 2013, Mitsubishi announced a policy to unify the future kei car development with NMKV.

When the third generation eK Dayz was announced, both companies announced that it would jointly develop a super height wagon kei car as the second model. On 25 March of the same year, Nissan announced that the name of the car would be Dayz Roox, alongside an announcement of the design sketch. On October 3, Mitsubishi also announced that it would name the car as the eK space. Both cars went on sale on 13 February 2014.

In April 2016, Mitsubishi Motors admitted that its employees had falsified fuel efficiency data for the eK Wagon, eK Space, Nissan Dayz and Nissan Dayz Roox. The scandal led to the acquisition of Mitsubishi Motors by Nissan the following month.

As of June 2013, the development team had a total of 4 people. Each 2 people were from Nissan and Mitsubishi, and a total of 18 people in charge of development, 16 from Mitsubishi and 2 from Nissan. NMKV have not started the development of light commercial vehicles in the kei car segment, as both Nissan and Mitsubishi are still rebadging the Suzuki Carry and Suzuki Every.

== Models ==
Release date	Nissan		Mitsubishi		Segment
Release date	Image	Name	Image	Name	Segment
6 June 2013		Dayz		eK Wagon (third generation)	Tall kei car wagon
6 June 2013		Dayz Highway Star		eK Custom	Tall kei car wagon
13 February 2014		Dayz Roox		eK Space	Super height kei car wagon
13 February 2014		Dayz Roox Highway Star		eK Space Custom	Super height kei car wagon
28 March 2019		Dayz (second generation)		eK Wagon (fourth generation)	Tall kei car wagon
28 March 2019		Dayz Highway Star (second generation)		eK X	Tall kei car wagon Crossover kei car (eK X)
19 March 2020		Roox (second generation)		eK Space (second generation)	Super height kei car wagon
19 March 2020		Roox Highway Star (second generation)		eK X Space (second generation)	Super height kei car wagon Crossover kei car (eK X Space)
20 May 2022		Sakura		eK X EV	Battery electric tall kei car
13 January 2023	—			Delica Mini	Super height kei car wagon Crossover kei car
22 August 2025		Roox (third generation)		eK Space (third generation)	Super height kei car wagon
22 August 2025		Roox Highway Star (third generation)		Delica Mini (second generation)	Super height kei car wagon Crossover kei car

== Locations ==
- Headquarter: Nissan Technical Center, V2 Building, 2F, 560-2, Okatsukoku, Atsugi-shi, Kanagawa, 243-0192
- Okazaki Plant: Mitsubishi Motors Technical Center Okazaki Main Building 4F, 1st Nakashinri, Hashime-cho, Okazaki-shi, Aichi (岡崎市, Headquarters- 3-23-17)
- Mizushima Office: Takasago-cho, 6-1 (Mitsubishi Motors Corporation Mizushima Plant), Mizushima, Kurashiki, Okayama
