= Mitsubishi Delica Mini =

Kei car model from Mitsubishi Motors

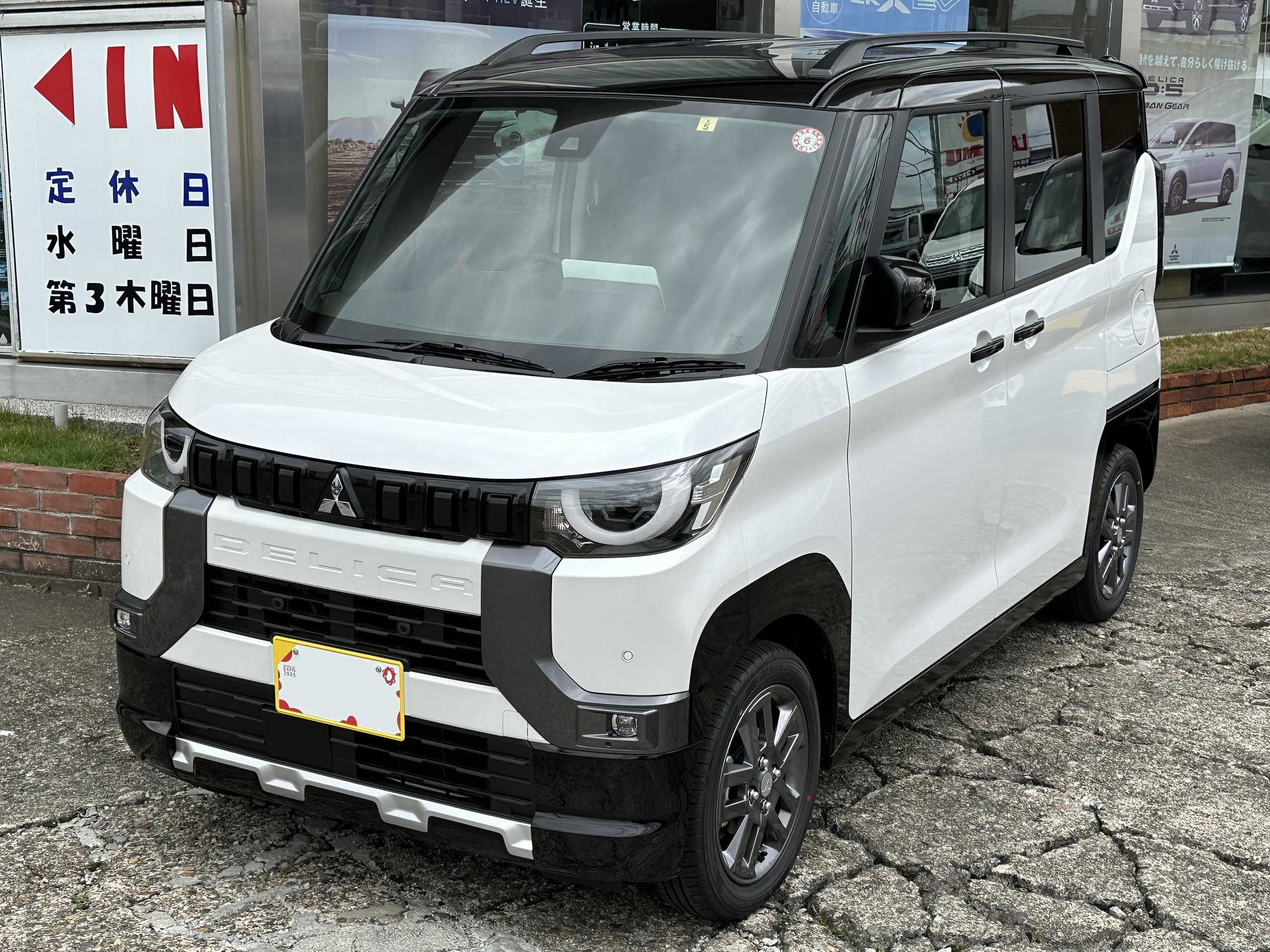
- First-generation Mitsubishi Delica Mini (B38A)

Overview
- Manufacturer: NMKV
- Production: 2023–present
- Assembly: Japan: Kurashiki, Okayama (Mizushima plant)

Body and chassis
- Class: Kei car
- Body style: 5-door microvan
- Layout: Front-engine, front-wheel-drive; Front-engine, four-wheel-drive

Chronology
- Predecessor: Mitsubishi eK X Space

The Mitsubishi Delica Mini (Japanese: 三菱・デリカミニ, Hepburn: Mitsubishi Derika Mini) is a kei car manufactured by NMKV, a joint venture between Nissan and Mitsubishi Motors. Using the Delica nameplate and replacing the eK X Space on which it was also based, it went on sale in May 2023 as the kei variation of the Delica lineup.

Announced in late 2022, the Delica Mini went on sale in May 2023 – to coincide with the 55th anniversary of the original Delica. Mitsubishi had considered naming the car the "Delica D:1" as a continuation of the larger Delica D:5, D:3, and D:2 models, but in the end they opted for "Delica Mini" to tie it to the very successful Pajero Mini instead.

It was announced as a kei car that embodies the concept of the larger Delica, which combines the features of an crossover and a minivan. It is the direct successor to the eK Cross Space, which was introduced in 2020. Like the eK Space, it is managed by NMKV, a joint venture between Mitsubishi Motors and Nissan Motor, and produced by Mitsubishi Motors.

== First generation (B34A/B35A/B37A/B38A; 2023) ==
First generation
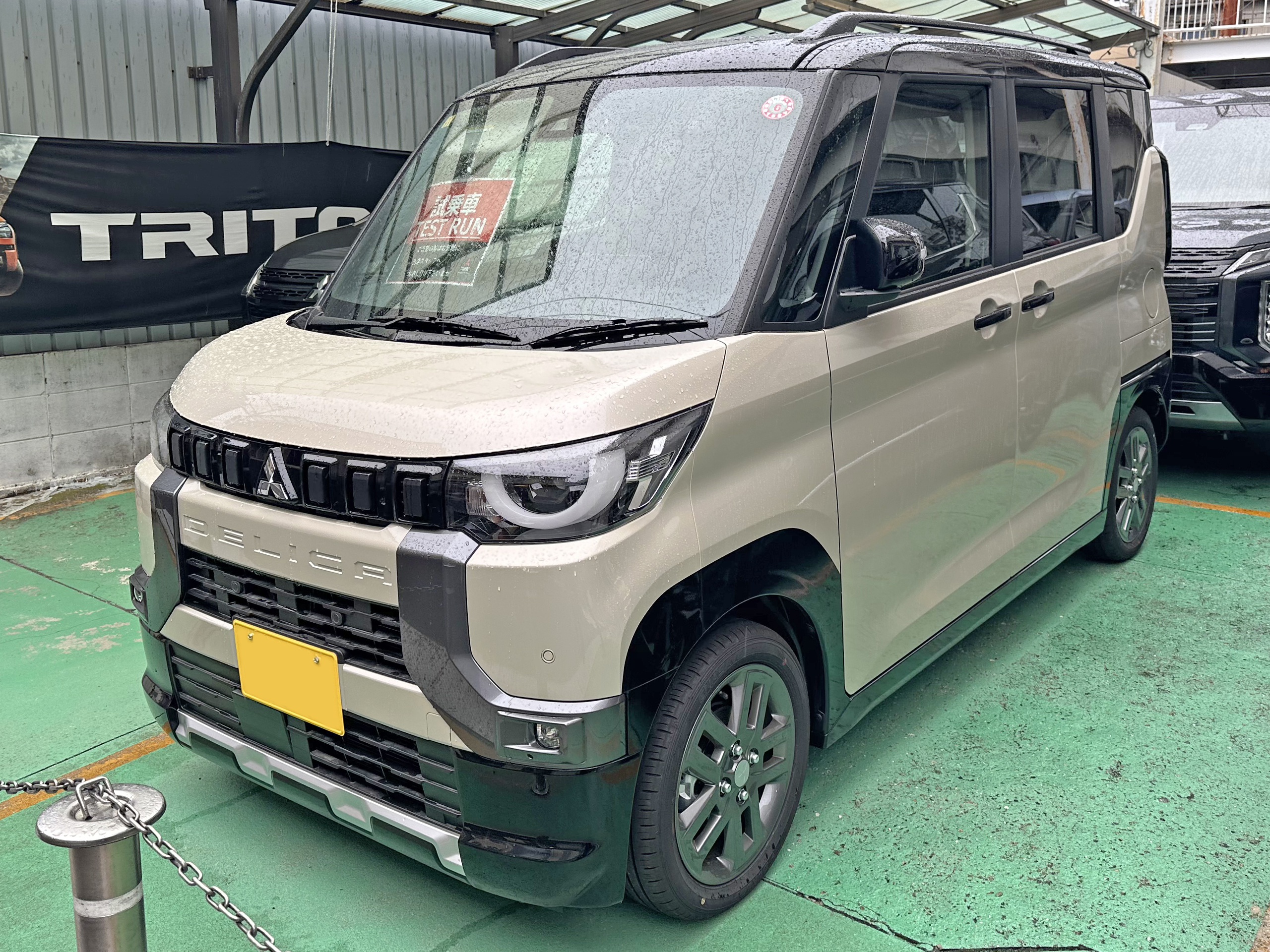
- Delica Mini T Premium 2WD (B35A)

Overview
- Model code: B34A/B35A/B37A/B38A
- Production: May 2023 – September 2025

Body and chassis
- Layout: Front-engine, front-wheel-drive (B34A/B35A); Front-engine, four-wheel-drive (B37A/B38A)
- Related: Mitsubishi eK X Space; Nissan Roox

Powertrain
- Engine: Petrol: 658 cc BR06DE I3 (B34A/B37A); 658 cc BR06DET turbo I3 (B35A/B38A)
- Electric motor: SM21 AC synchronous
- Power output: 38 kW (51 hp; 52 PS) (BR06DE); 47 kW (63 hp; 64 PS) (BR06DET); 2.0 kW (2.68 hp; 2.72 PS) (electric motor)
- Transmission: CVT
- Hybrid drivetrain: Mild hybrid
- Battery: Lithium-ion

Dimensions
- Wheelbase: 2,495 mm (98.2 in)
- Length: 3,395 mm (133.7 in)
- Width: 1,475 mm (58.1 in)
- Height: 1,800–1,830 mm (70.9–72.0 in)
- Curb weight: 970–1,060 kg (2,138–2,337 lb)

The first-generation Delica Mini was offered in G, G Premium, T, and T Premium grade levels. The "T" models have the turbocharged engine.

Like the eK X Space, the Delica Mini features "Grip Control", which applies the brake to any wheel which loses traction on slippery surfaces. It also features Hill Descent Control (HDC), which applies the brakes to maintain a slow, steady speed on steep inclines or slopes, allowing the driver to concentrate on steering. The Delica Mini shares a lot of design elements with the eK X Space, such as the "Dynamic Shield" grille design, but also has prominent "DELICA" lettering at the front and rear. The interior is largely carryover, albeit with updated upholstery.

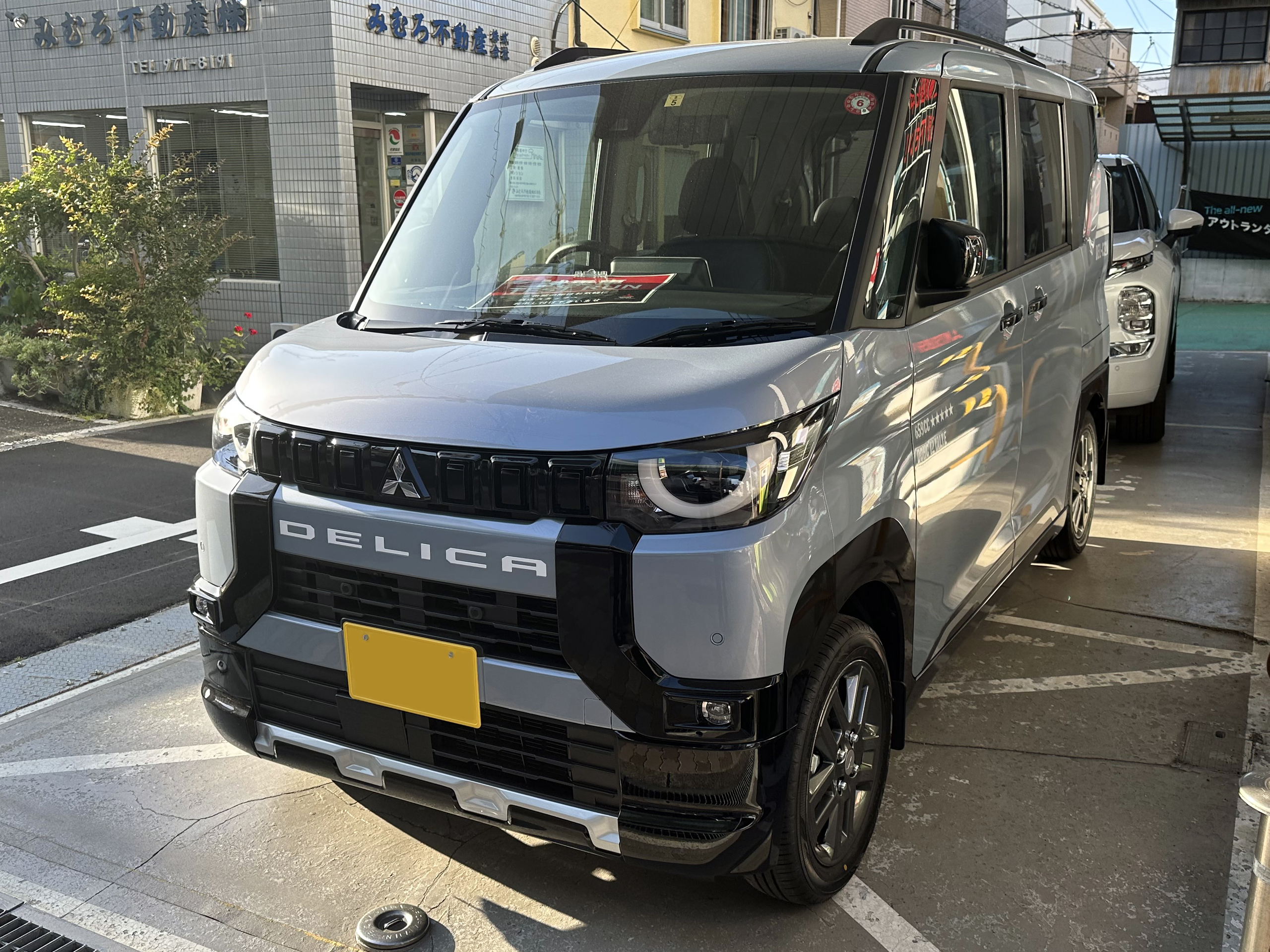
Delica Mini G Premium 4WD (B37A)

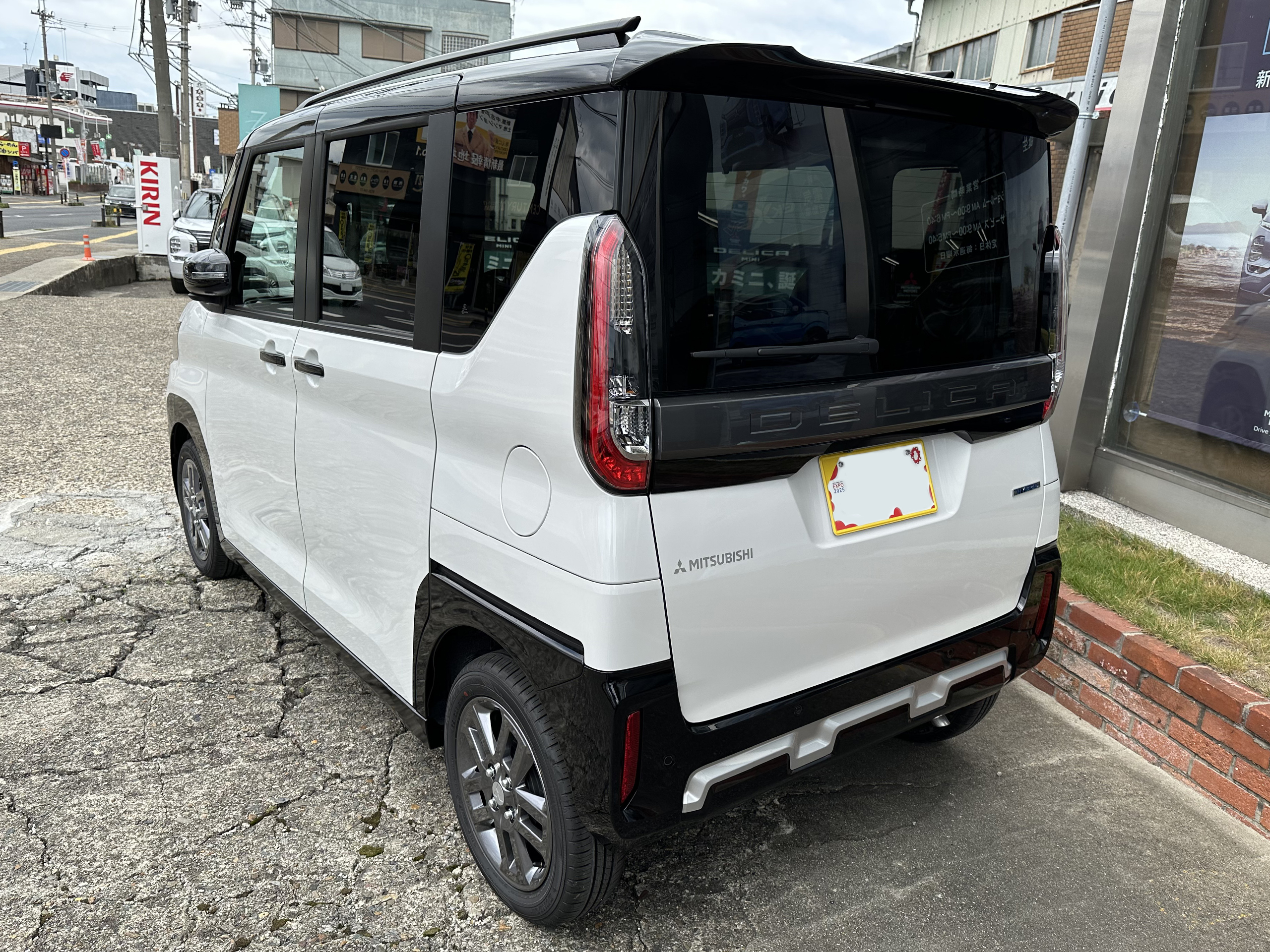
Rear view

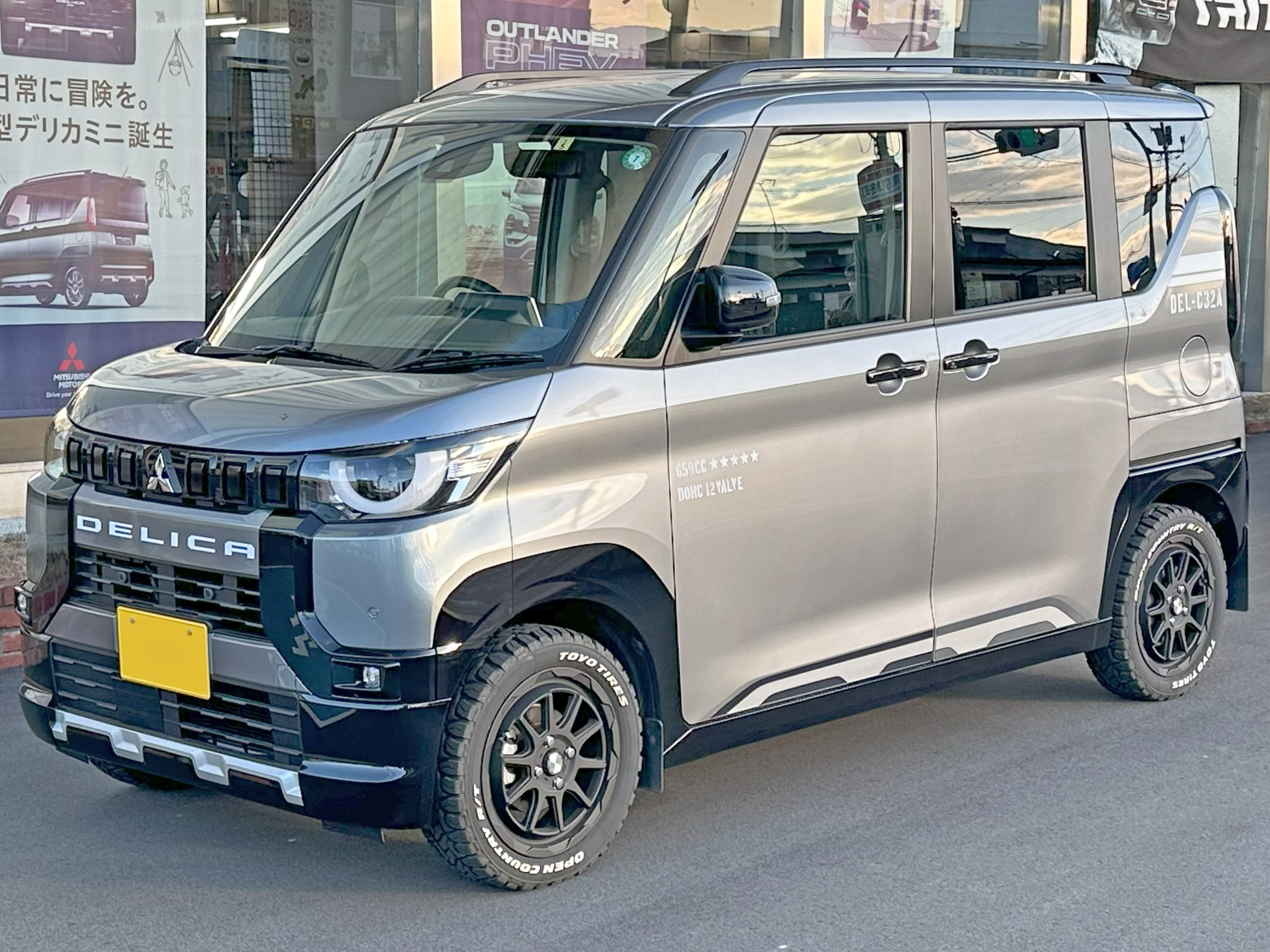
Delica Mini G Premium 4WD Active Tone Style (B37A)

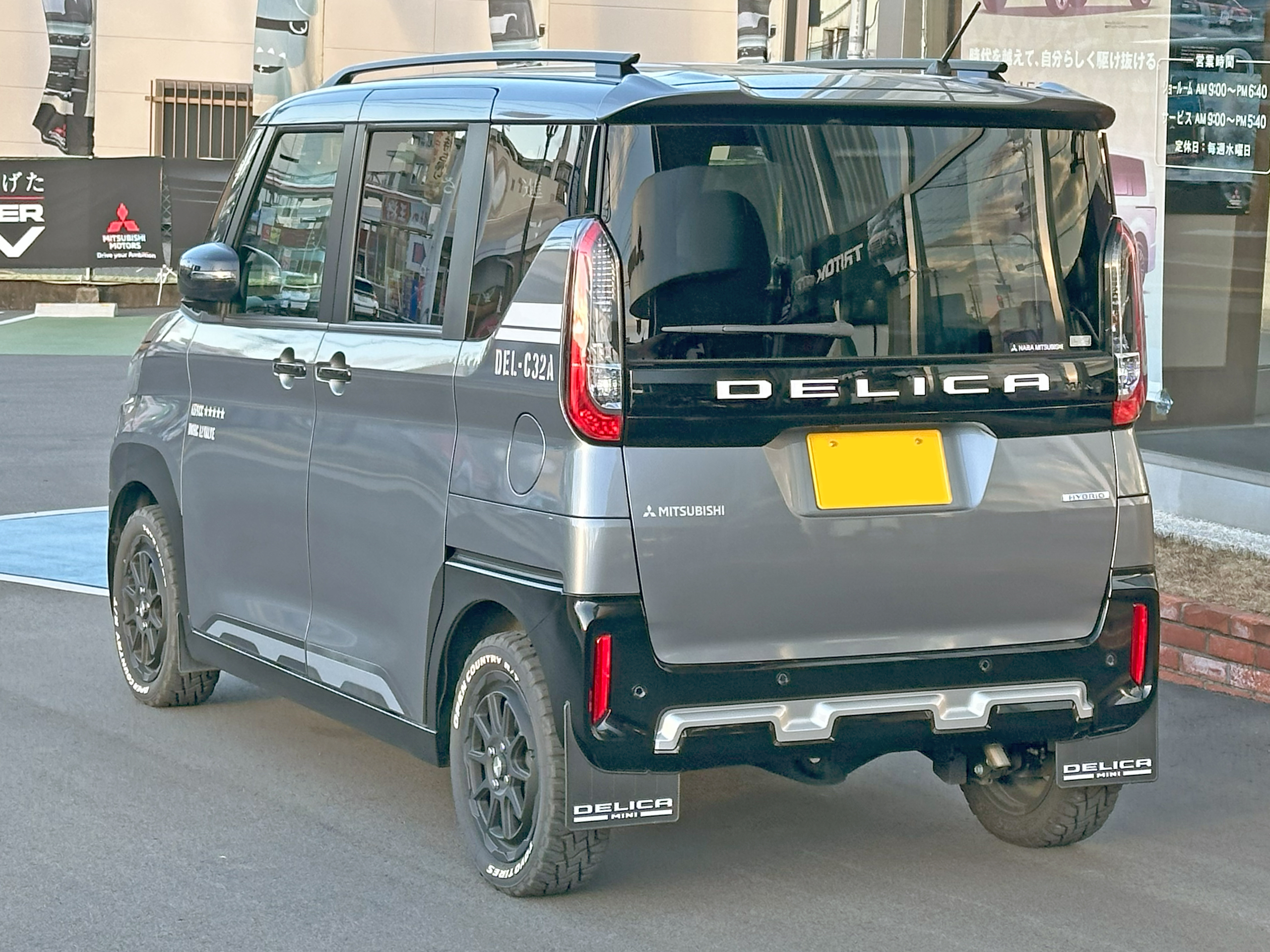
Delica Mini G Premium 4WD Active Tone Style (B37A)

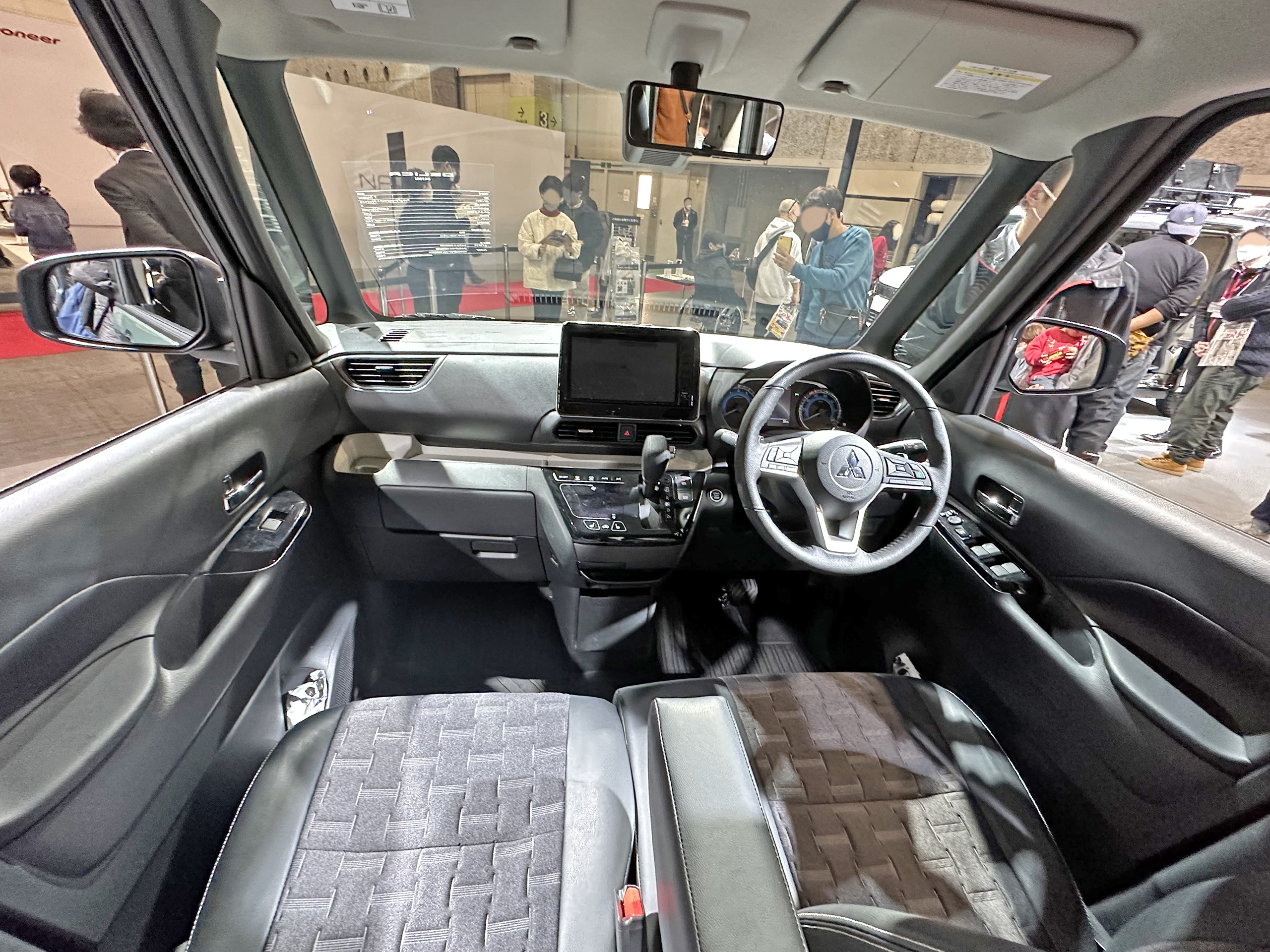
Interior

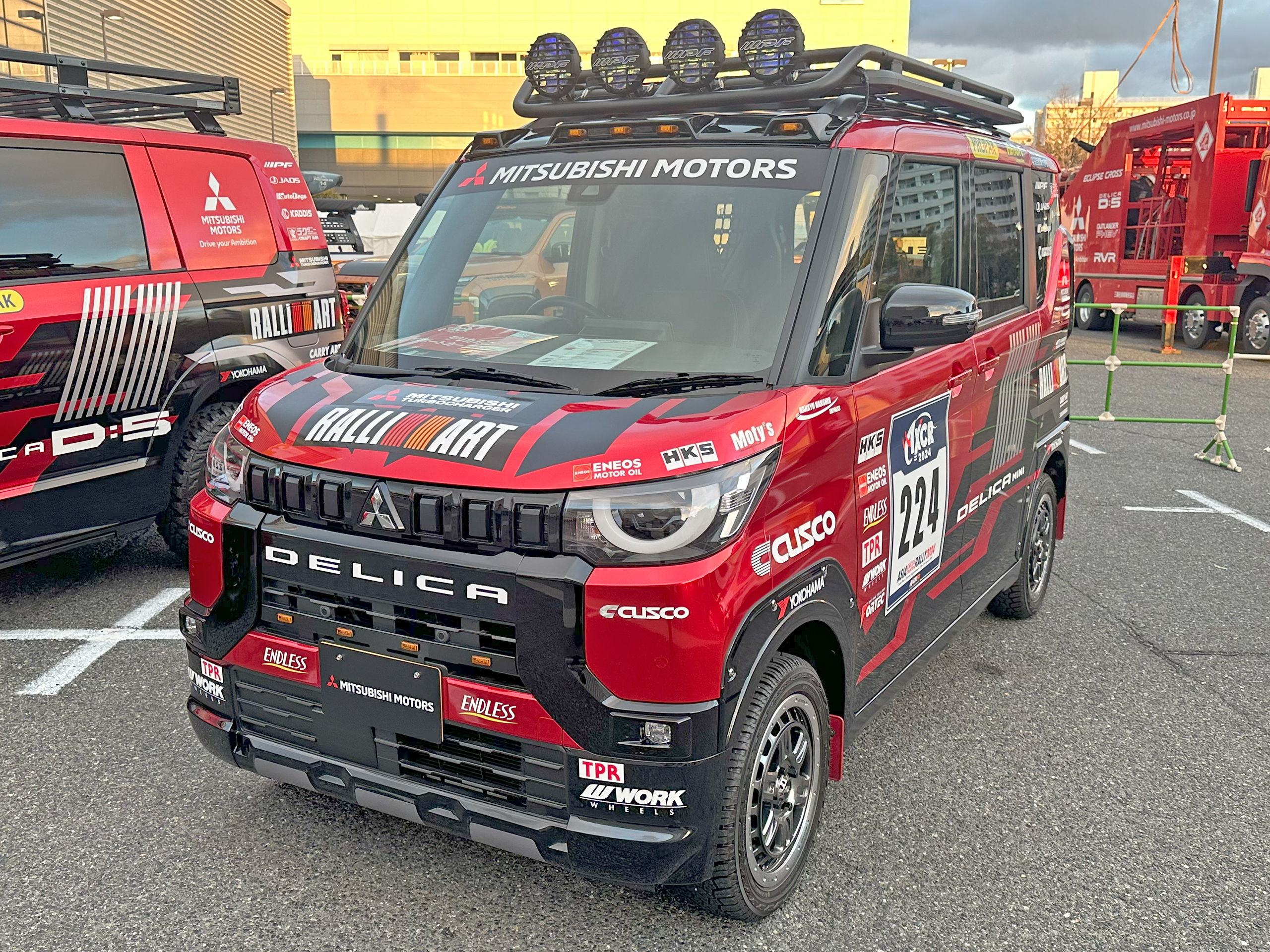
Delica Mini AXCR support car

=== Awards ===
The Delica Mini won the Good Design Award along with the Triton and Xforce.

The Delica Mini won the 2023–2024 Japan Car of the Year Design Award.

== Second generation (BA1A/BA2A/BA5A/BA6A; 2025) ==
Second generation
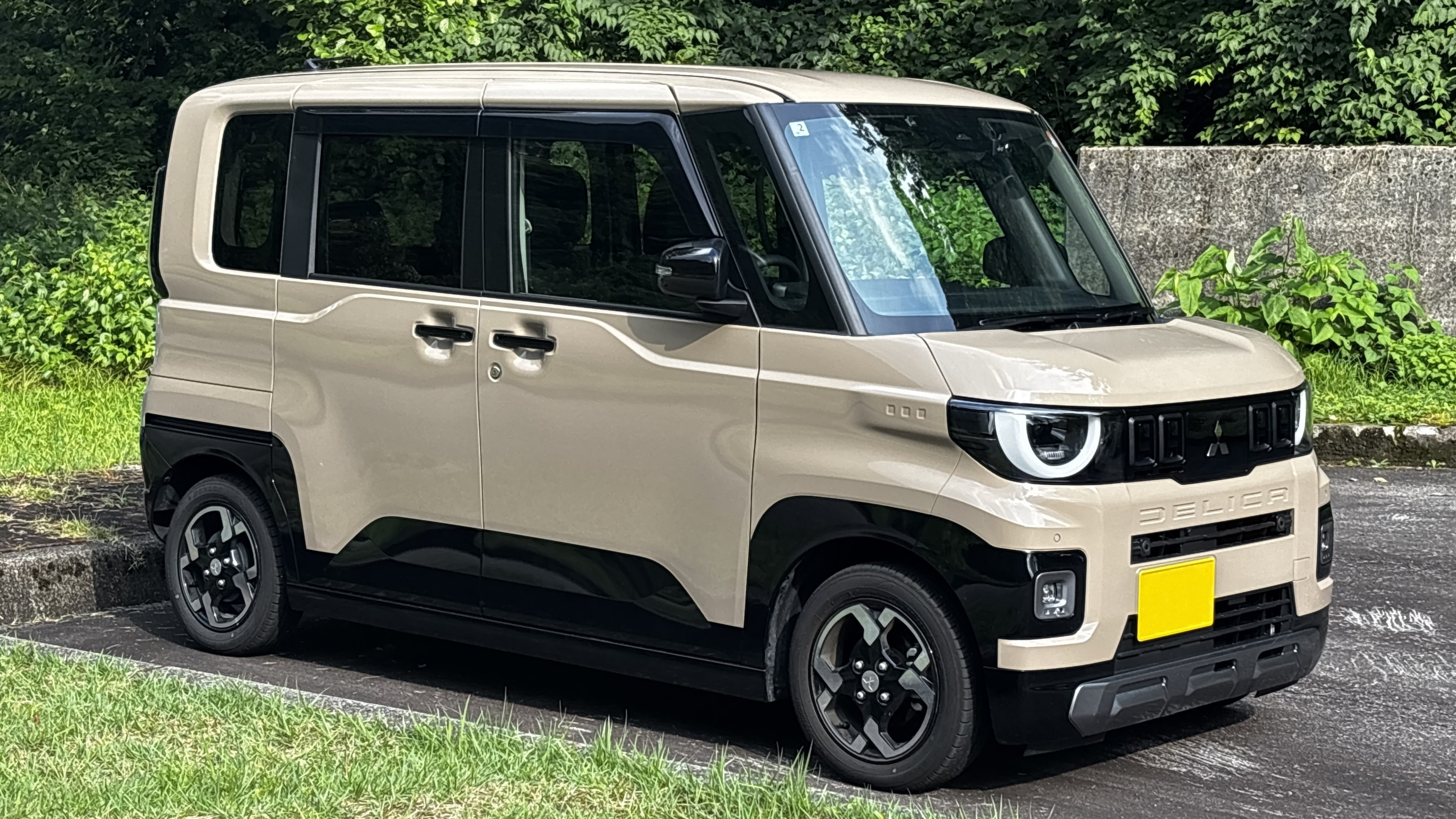
- Delica Mini T

Overview
- Model code: BA1A/BA2A/BA5A/BA6A
- Production: September 2025 – present

Body and chassis
- Layout: Front-engine, front-wheel-drive (BA1A/BA2A); Front-engine, four-wheel-drive (BA5A/BA6A)
- Related: Mitsubishi eK Space (third generation); Nissan Roox

Powertrain
- Engine: Petrol: 658 cc BR06DE I3 (BA1A/BA5A); 658 cc BR06DET turbo I3 (BA2A/BA6A)
- Power output: 38 kW (51 hp; 52 PS) (BR06DE); 47 kW (63 hp; 64 PS) (BR06DET)
- Transmission: CVT

Dimensions
- Wheelbase: 2,495 mm (98.2 in)
- Length: 3,395 mm (133.7 in)
- Width: 1,475 mm (58.1 in)
- Height: 1,785–1,830 mm (70.3–72.0 in)
- Curb weight: 970–1,060 kg (2,138–2,337 lb)

The second-generation Delica Mini was unveiled on 22 August 2025, along with the third-generation eK Space and its sister car, the fourth-generation Nissan Roox. It was released in September and went to sale in October the same year.

The front fascia retains the Dynamic Shield from the first generation, but the semicircular LED position lamps have been enlarged. The three diamonds logo have been slightly enlarged. The Dynamic Shield itself has been integrated into the bumper and is now the same color as the body. The rear tailgate garnish now has a larger "DELICA" logo engraved in the same color as the body, and the combination lamps now have a block motif.

Like first generation, The grades are "T" for turbo engine vehicles and "G" for naturally aspirated engine vehicles, with "T Premium" and "G Premium". In addition, the "Delimaru Package", based on the T/G Premium, has been added.

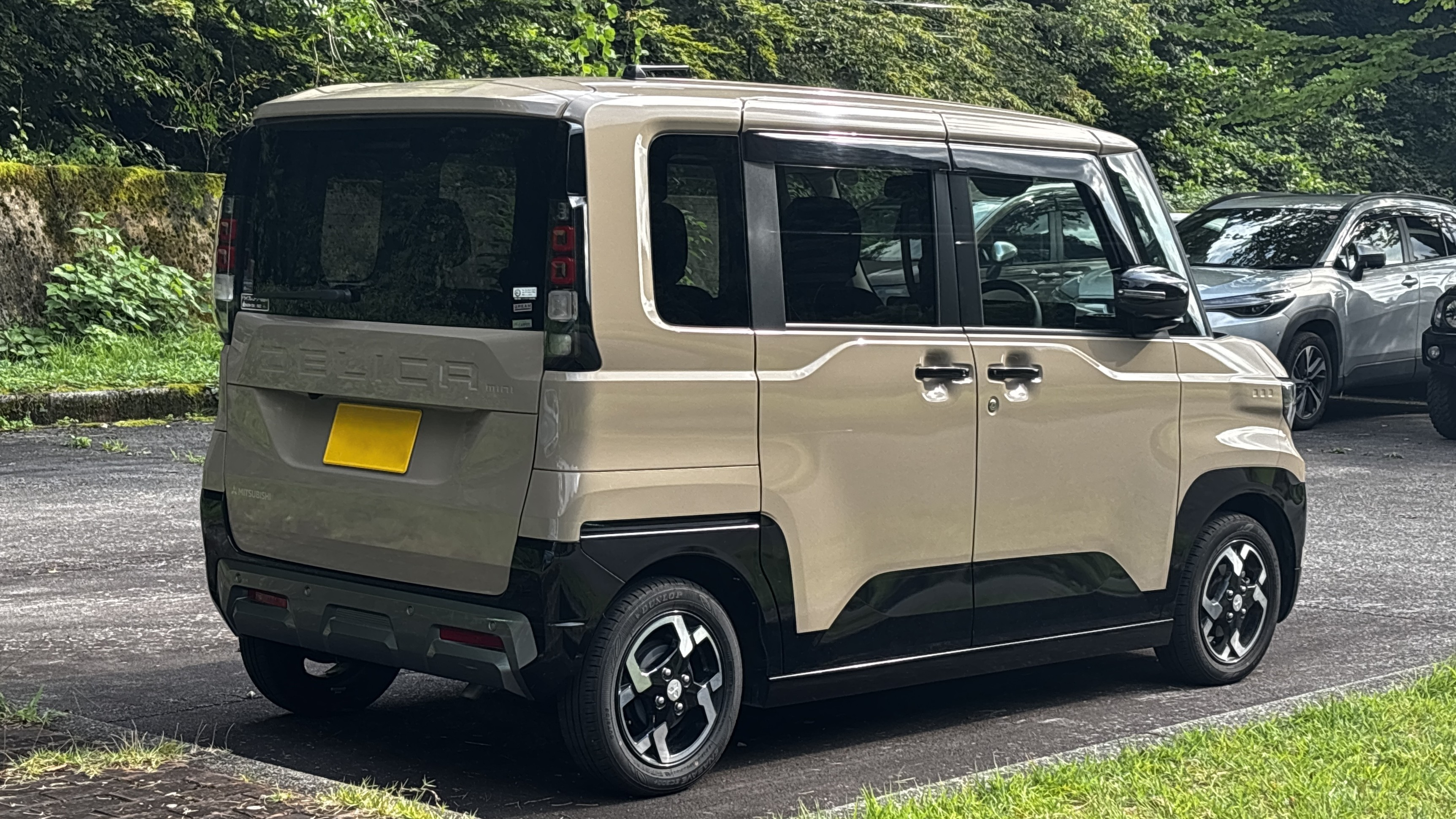
Rear view

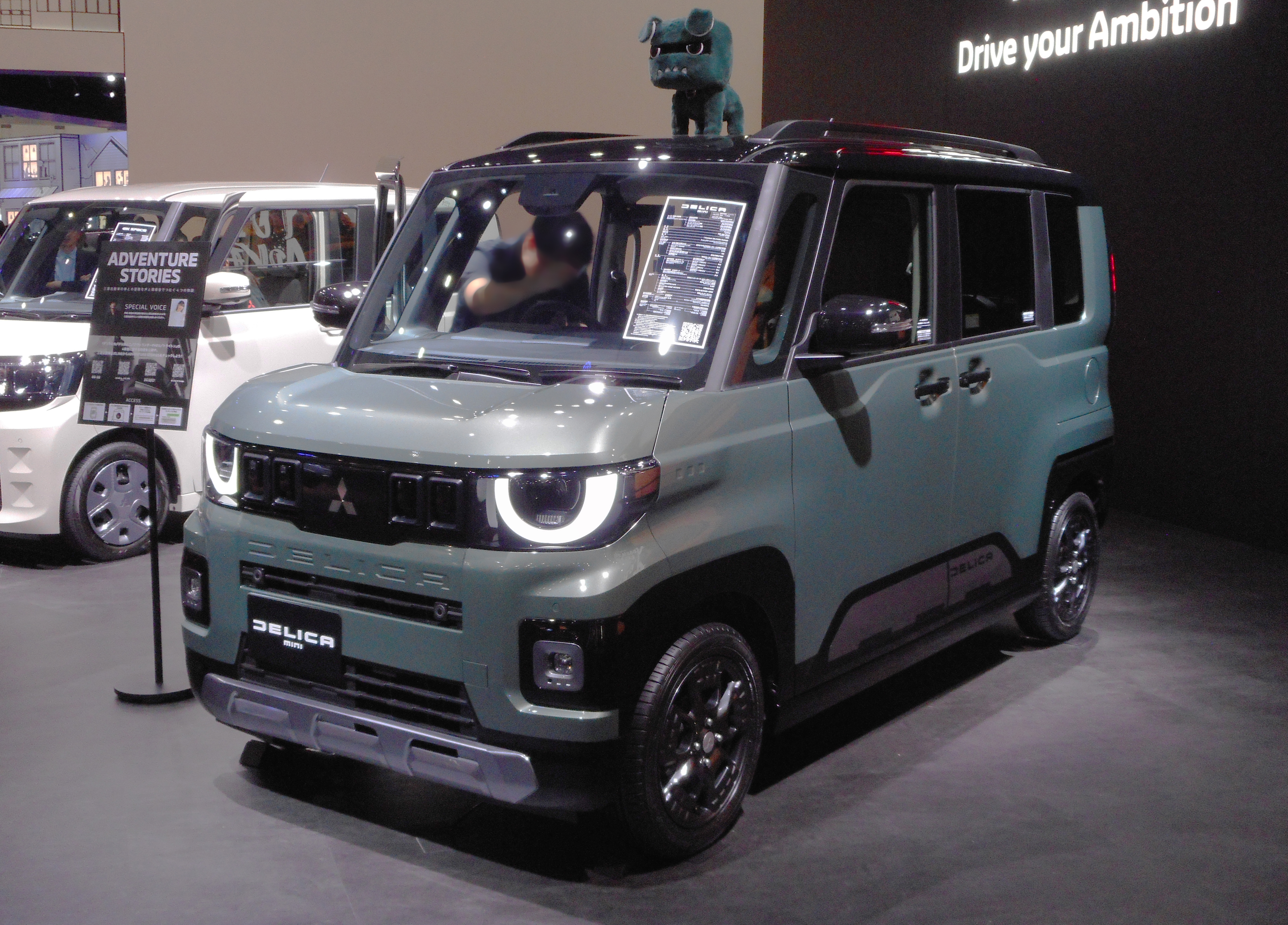
Mitsubishi Delica Mini T Premium DELIMARU Package

Mitsubishi Delica Active Tone Style (BA6A)

Rear view (Active Tone Style)

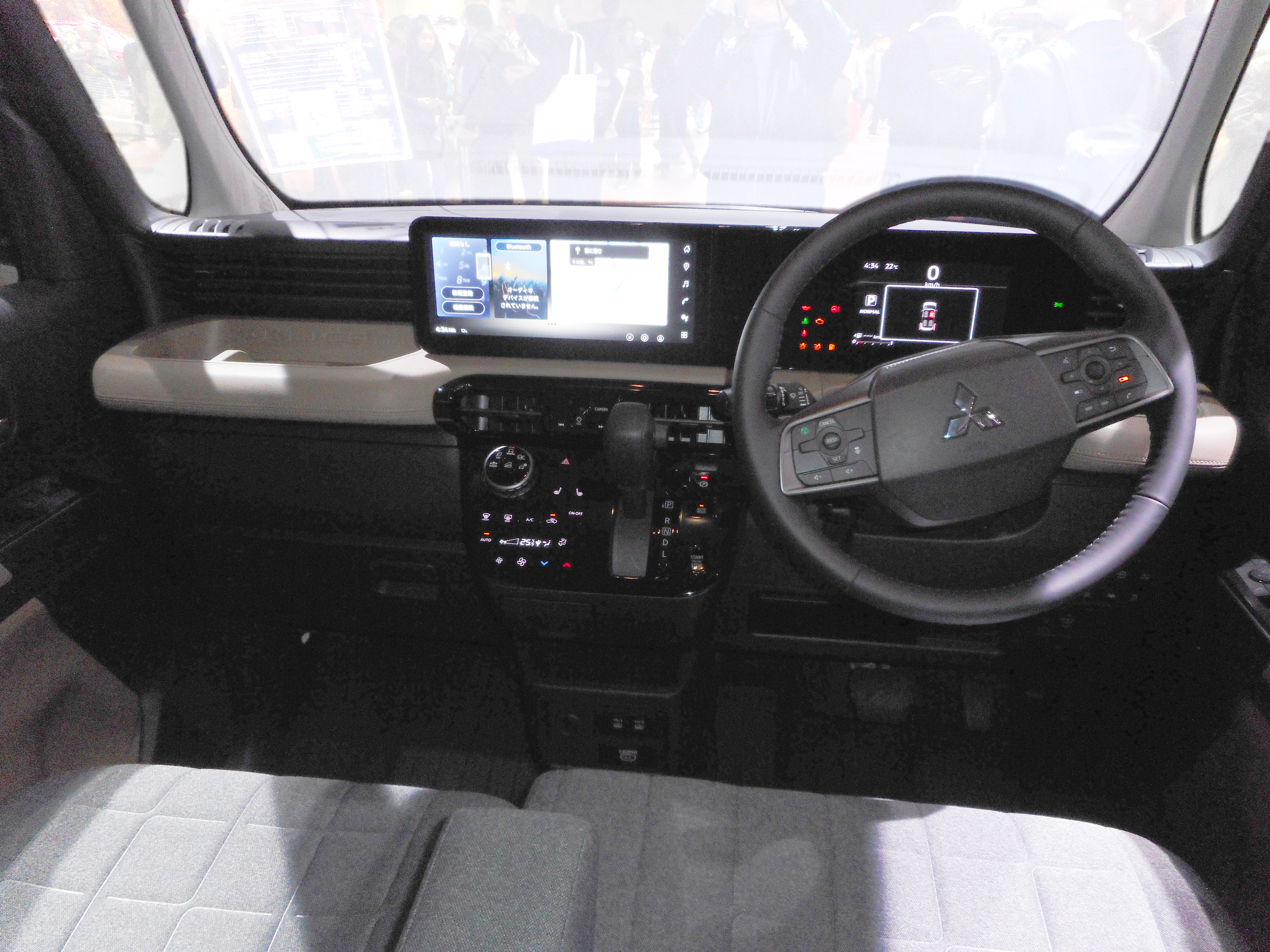
Interior

=== Awards ===
The second-generation Delica Mini was selected as one of the Best 100 in the 2025 Good Design Awards along with Delica series, and the Destinator. This is the second consecutive generation to win the Best Design Award, following the first generation that won in 2023.

It later won the 2026 RJC Car of the Year award alongside the third-generation eK Space and its twin version, the fourth-generation Roox.
