= Mitsubishi Express =

Mitsubishi Express is an automobile nameplate that has been used in Australia on three different models by the Japanese car manufacturer, Mitsubishi Motors:

Between 1980 and 1986, Mitsubishi in Australia sold the following vehicles:

- Mitsubishi L200 Express (MA/MB/MC/MD), a rebadged version of the Mitsubishi Forte.
- Mitsubishi L300 Express (SA/SB/SC/SD/SE), a rebadged version of the Mitsubishi Delica (second generation).

Between 1986 and 2013, Mitsubishi in Australia replaced the L300 Express with a new generation, now called Mitsubishi Express:

- Mitsubishi Express (SF/SG/SH/SJ), a rebadged version of the Mitsubishi Delica (third generation).

Between 1994 and 2005, Mitsubishi in Australia sold the pricier fourth generation of the Delica in parallel, also with the Express name plate:

- Mitsubishi Express (WA), a rebadged version of the Mitsubishi Delica (fourth generation).

Between 2020 and 2022, Mitsubishi sold a new generation of the Mitsubishi Express in Australia and now also in New Zealand:

- Mitsubishi Express (X82), a rebadged version of the Renault Trafic (third generation).
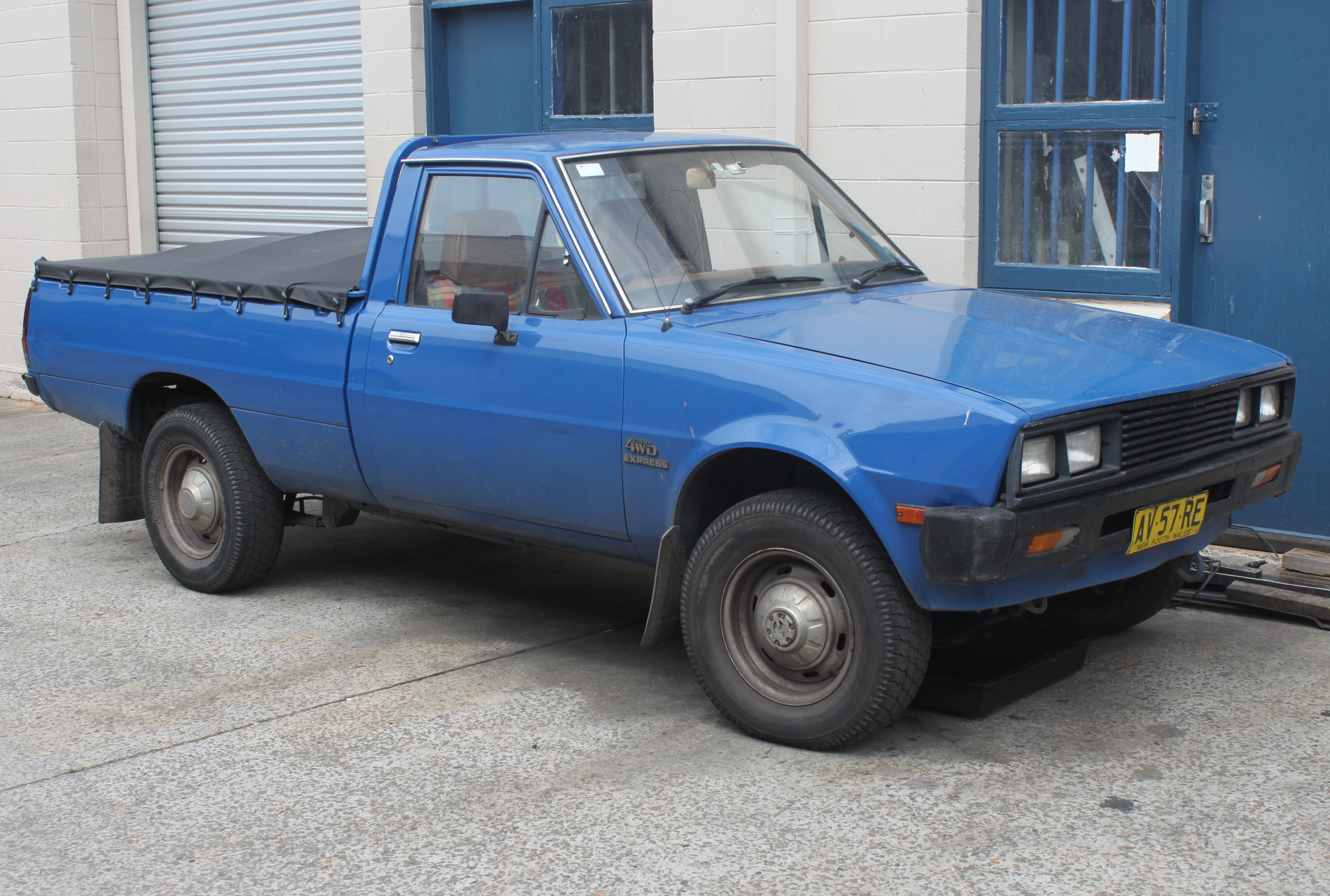
1980–1986 Mitsubishi L200 Express (MA/MB/MC/MD)

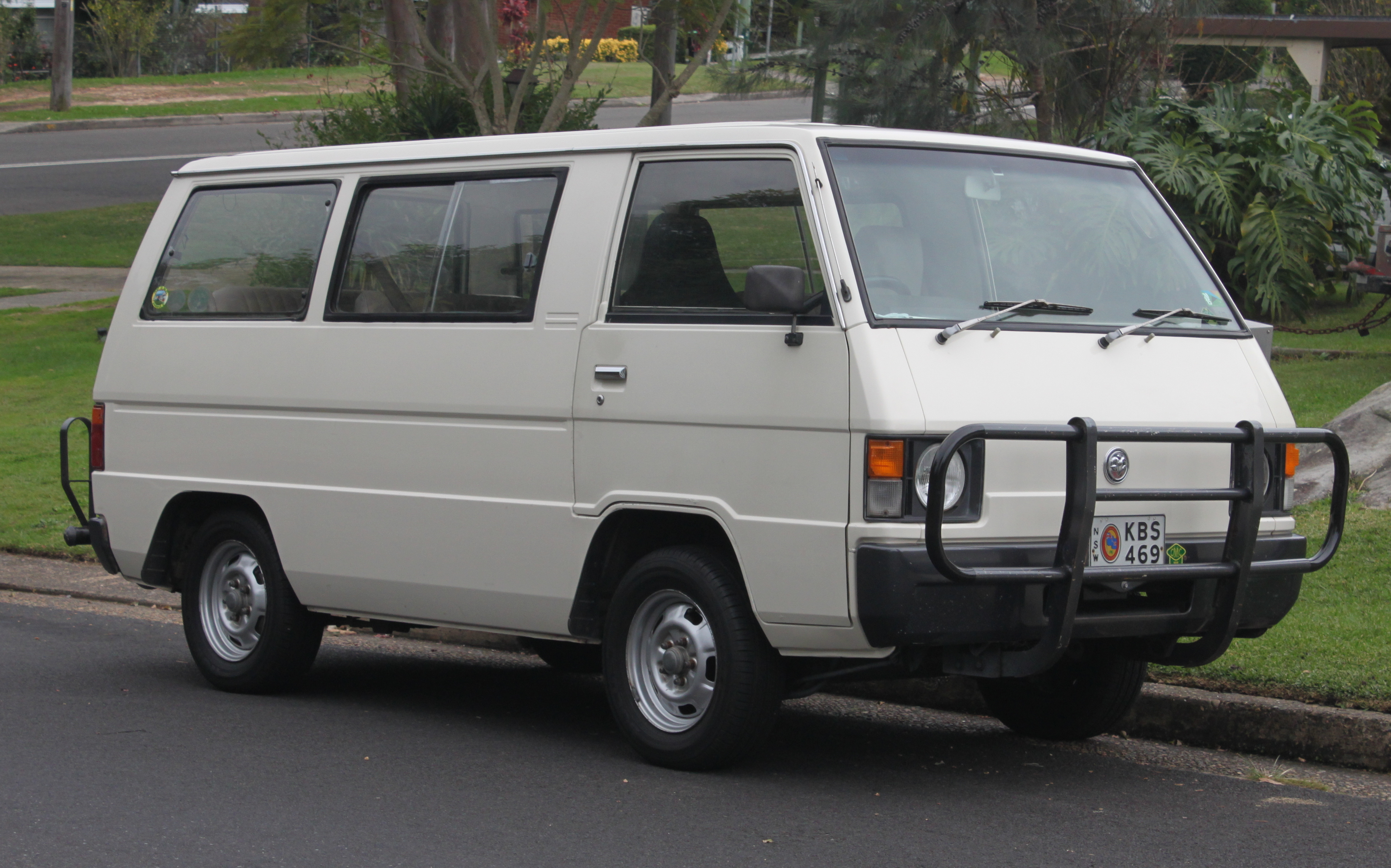
1980–1986 Mitsubishi L300 Express (SA/SB/SC/SD/SE)

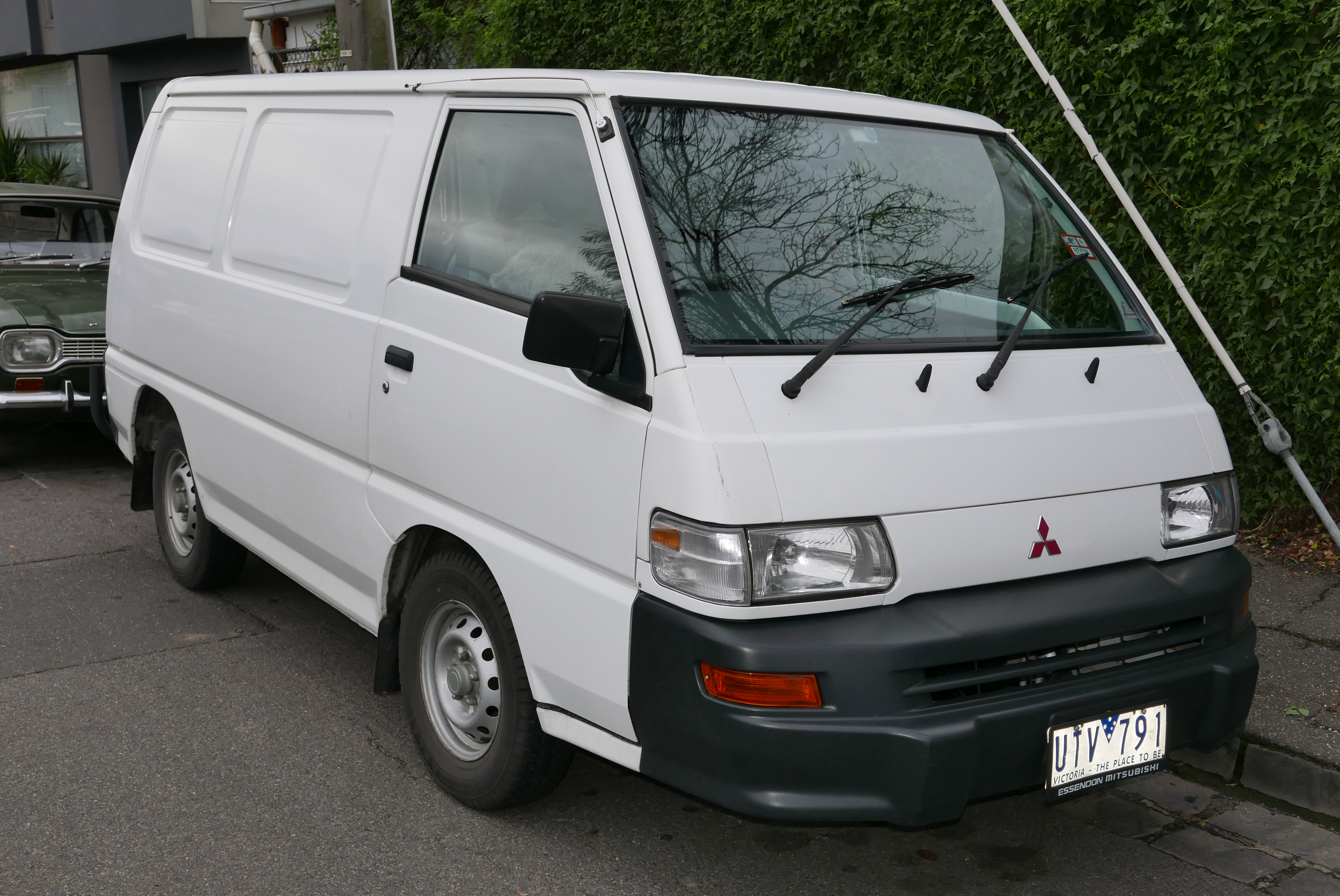
1986–2013 Mitsubishi Express (SF/SG/SH/SJ)

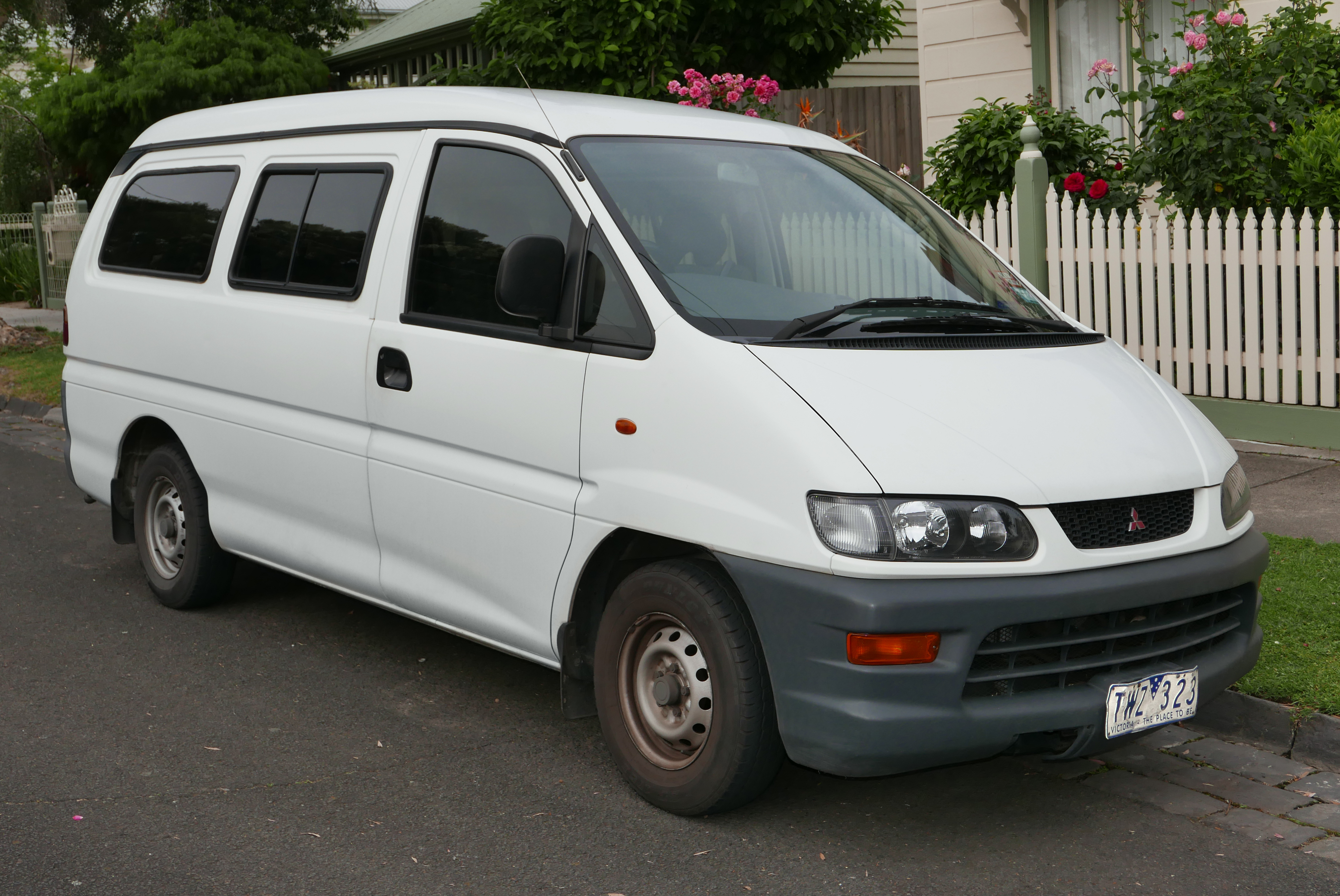
1994–2005 Mitsubishi Express (WA)

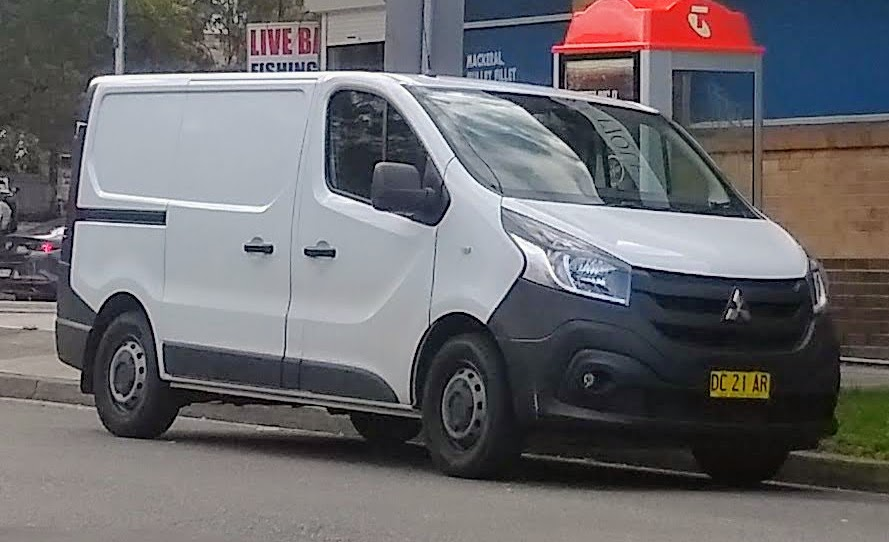
2020–2022 Mitsubishi Express (X82)
