= Nissan Sakura =

Battery electric kei car

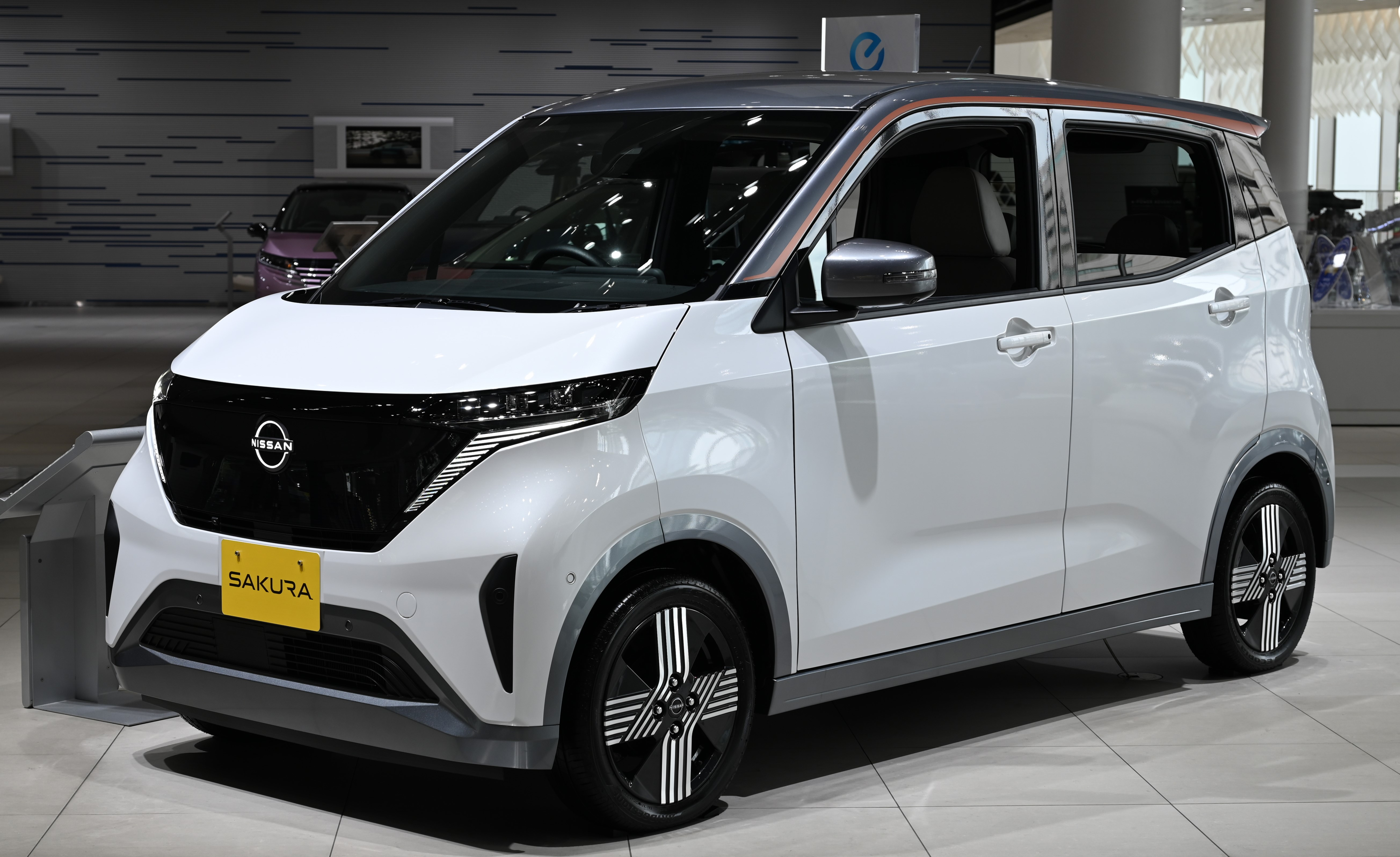
- 2024 Nissan Sakura G (B6AW)

Overview
- Manufacturer: NMKV
- Model code: B6AW (Mitsubishi); KE0 (Nissan)
- Production: 2022–present
- Assembly: Japan: Kurashiki, Okayama (Mitsubishi Motors Mizushima plant)

Body and chassis
- Class: Kei car
- Body style: 5-door hatchback
- Layout: Front-motor, front-wheel-drive
- Platform: KEI-EV
- Related: Nissan Dayz (second generation) / Mitsubishi eK (fourth generation)

Powertrain
- Electric motor: MM48
- Power output: 47 kW (64 PS)
- Battery: 20 kWh lithium-ion
- Electric range: 180 km (112 mi) (WLTC)

Dimensions
- Wheelbase: 2,495 mm (98.2 in)
- Length: 3,395 mm (133.7 in)
- Width: 1,475 mm (58.1 in)
- Height: 1,655 mm (65.2 in)
- Kerb weight: 1,070–1,080 kg (2,359–2,381 lb)

Chronology
- Predecessor: Nissan Hypermini (indirect)

The Nissan Sakura (Japanese: 日産・サクラ) is a battery electric kei car marketed by Nissan and produced by NMKV. Named after the national flower of Japan, it was introduced on 20 May 2022 as the first battery electric kei car from Nissan. It is developed and manufactured alongside the Mitsubishi eK X EV (pronounced "EK Cross"), which shares its body structure with the petrol-powered eK X (also sold as the Nissan Dayz). The only external shared parts are the windshield, door handles, and wing mirrors. Its design was previewed by the IMk concept which was showcased in 2019. Mitsubishi's internal model code is B6AW, while Nissan refers to it as the KE0.

== Overview ==
=== Concept model ===
The production model of the Sakura is based on the Nissan IMk concept, an electric kei car concept unveiled during the 2019 Tokyo Motor Show. The name IMk is a portmanteau for Intelligent Mobility K-car .

According to Nissan, the exterior design was inspired by mizuhiki patterns, while the front grille and rear combination lamps feature a lattice pattern that mimics wood, resulting in a dynamic design that would later be seen in the Ariya and the E13 Note.

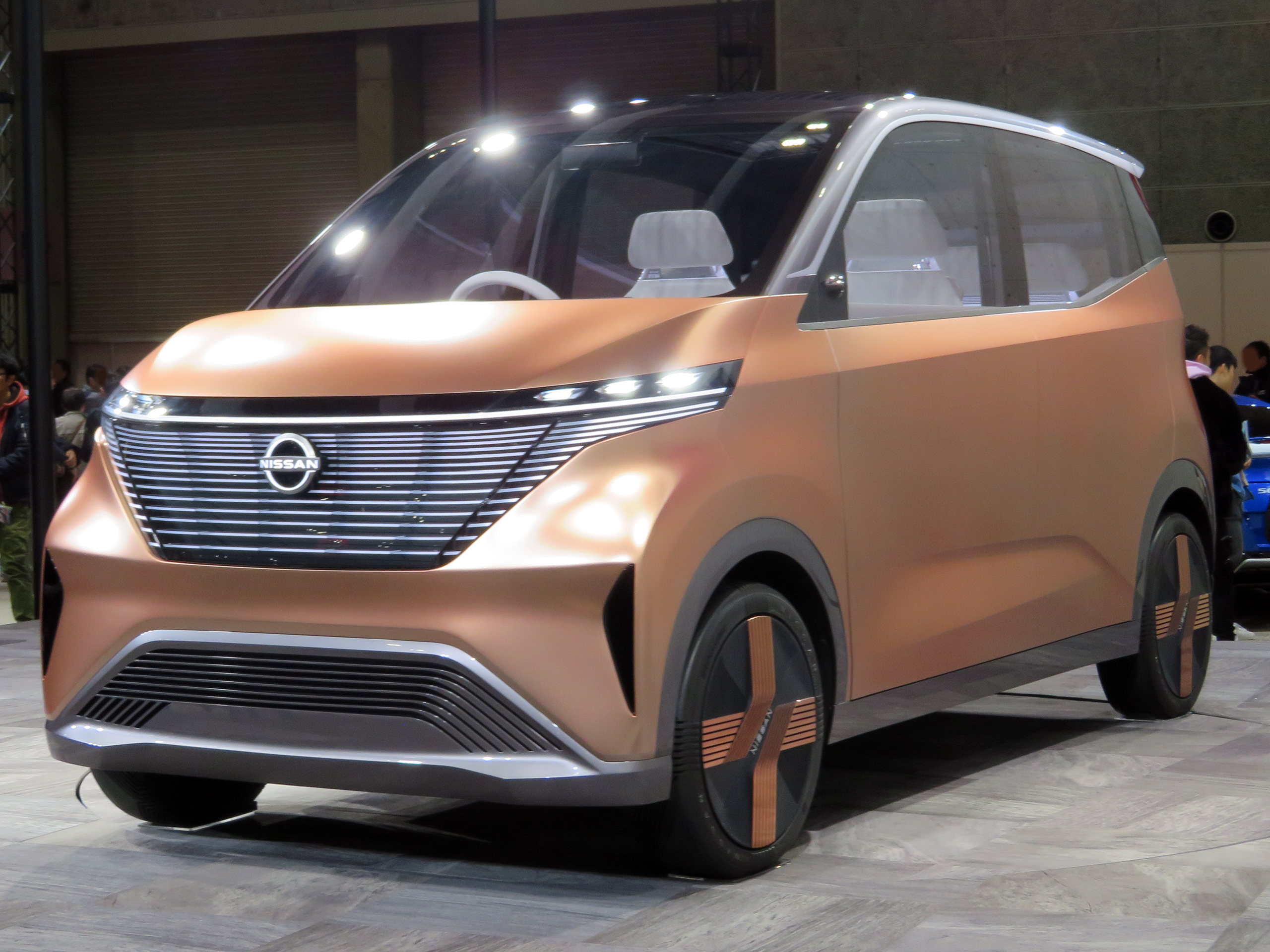
Nissan IMK Concept

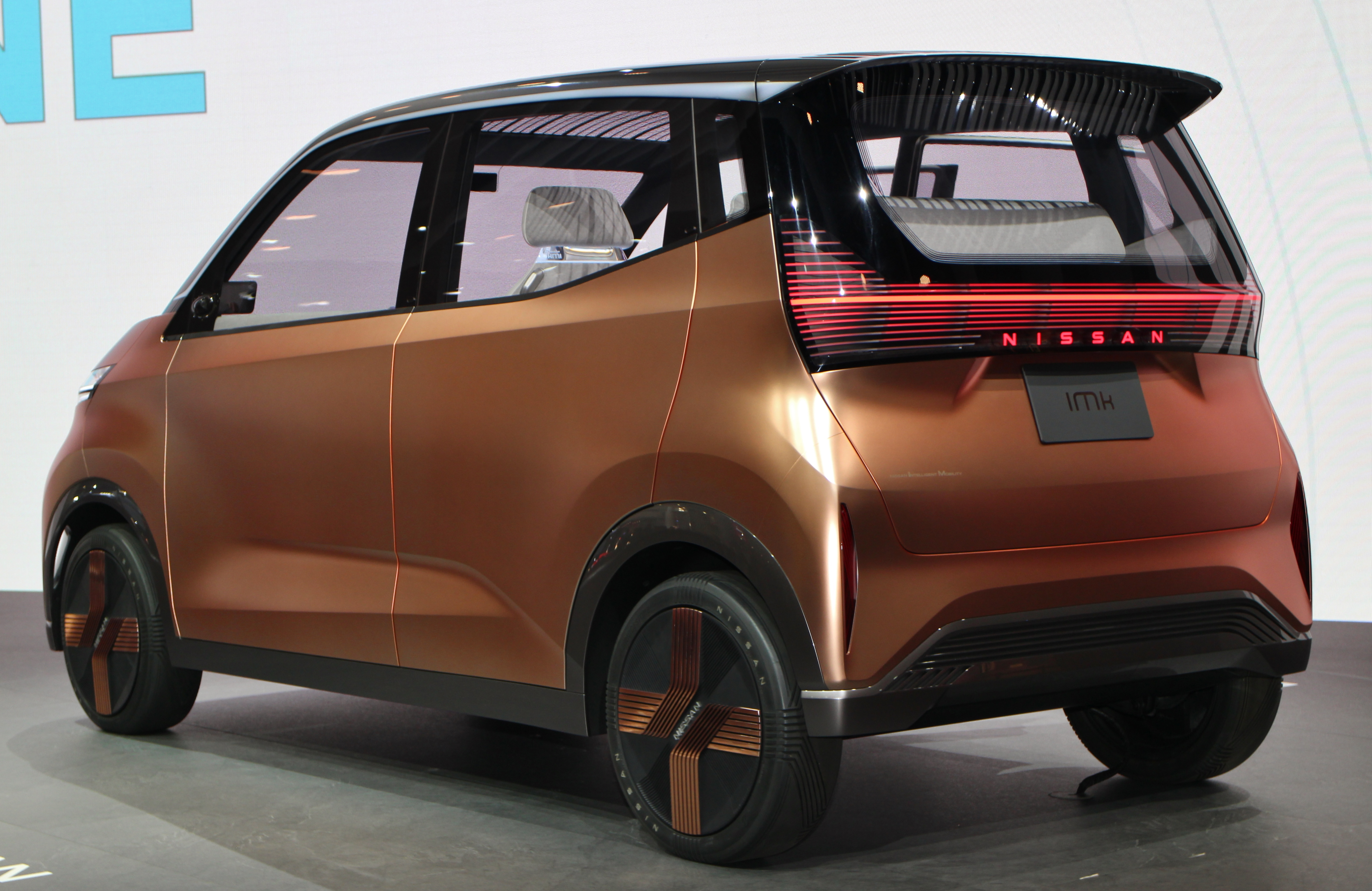
Rear view

=== Production model ===
The Mass production was announced in 2021, and assembled in Mitsubishi Mizushima Plant. For Mizushima plant, it is the second EV car were produced after the i-MiEV which was discontinued in the same year. The Sakura nameplate was revealed in May 2022 along with OEM rebadged version Mitsubishi eK X EV.

The exterior features entirely new body panels except for the front windshield, door mirrors, and door handles. The front face eliminates the prominent grille and adopts a shield design which was used from the Ariya. The taillights are a long bar type, and the NISSAN lettering as the Ariya and the third-generation Note is placed below the centre. The colour options were available in solid colours and two-tone colours. Eleven solid colors, four two-tone colours, were available.

A minor facelift was unveiled in April 2026, featuring body-coloured grille.

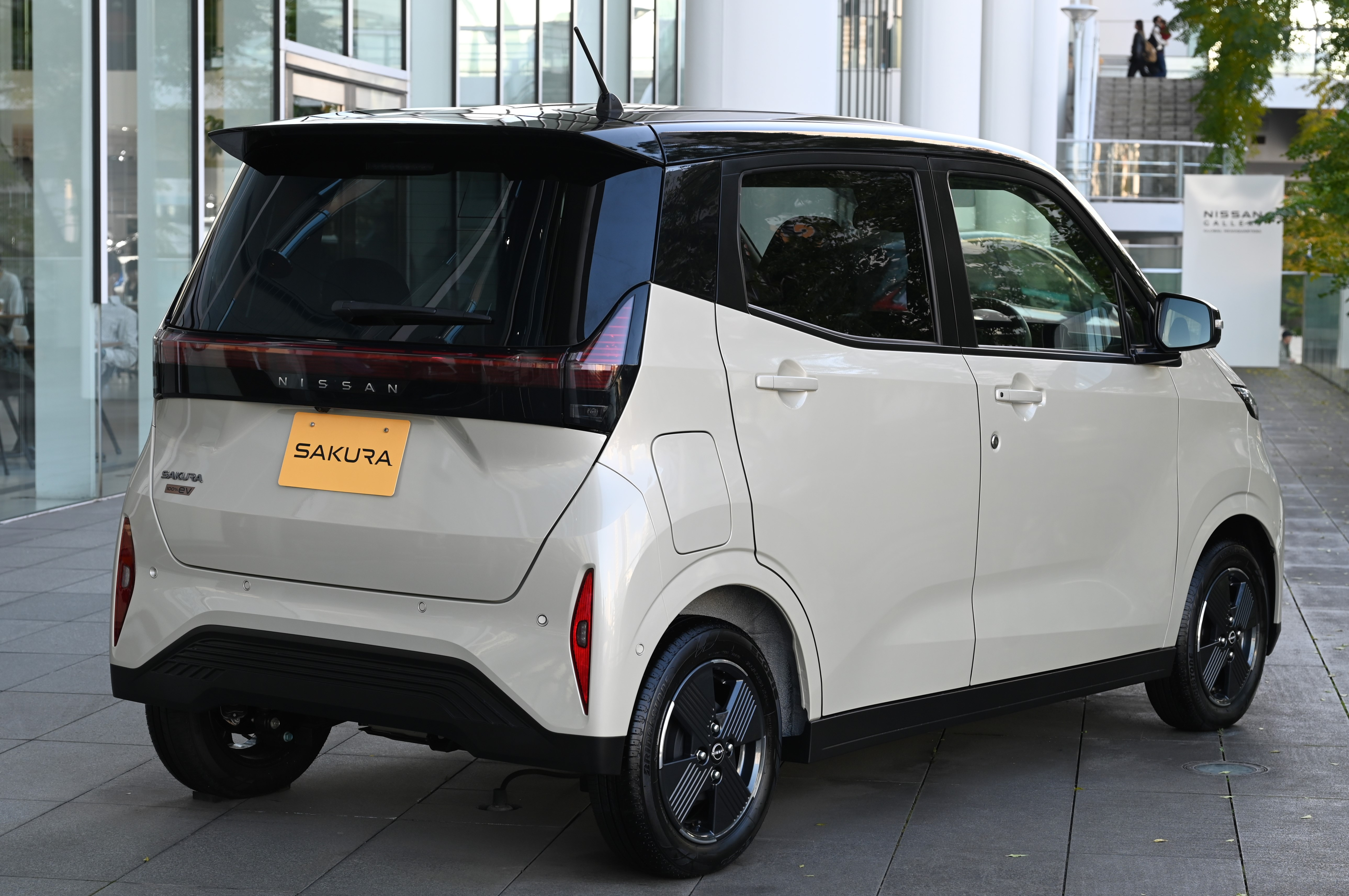
Rear view

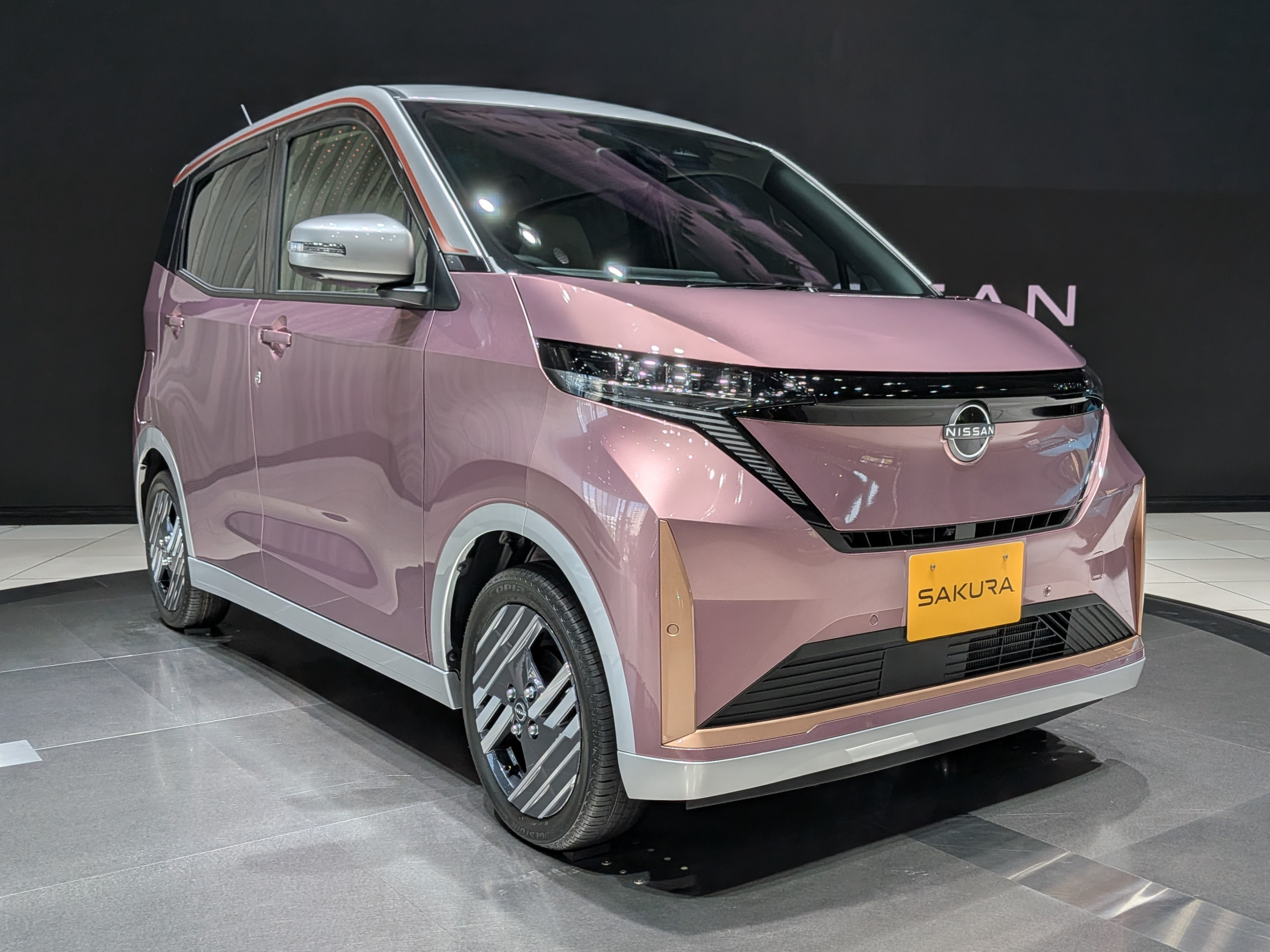
2026 Minor facelift

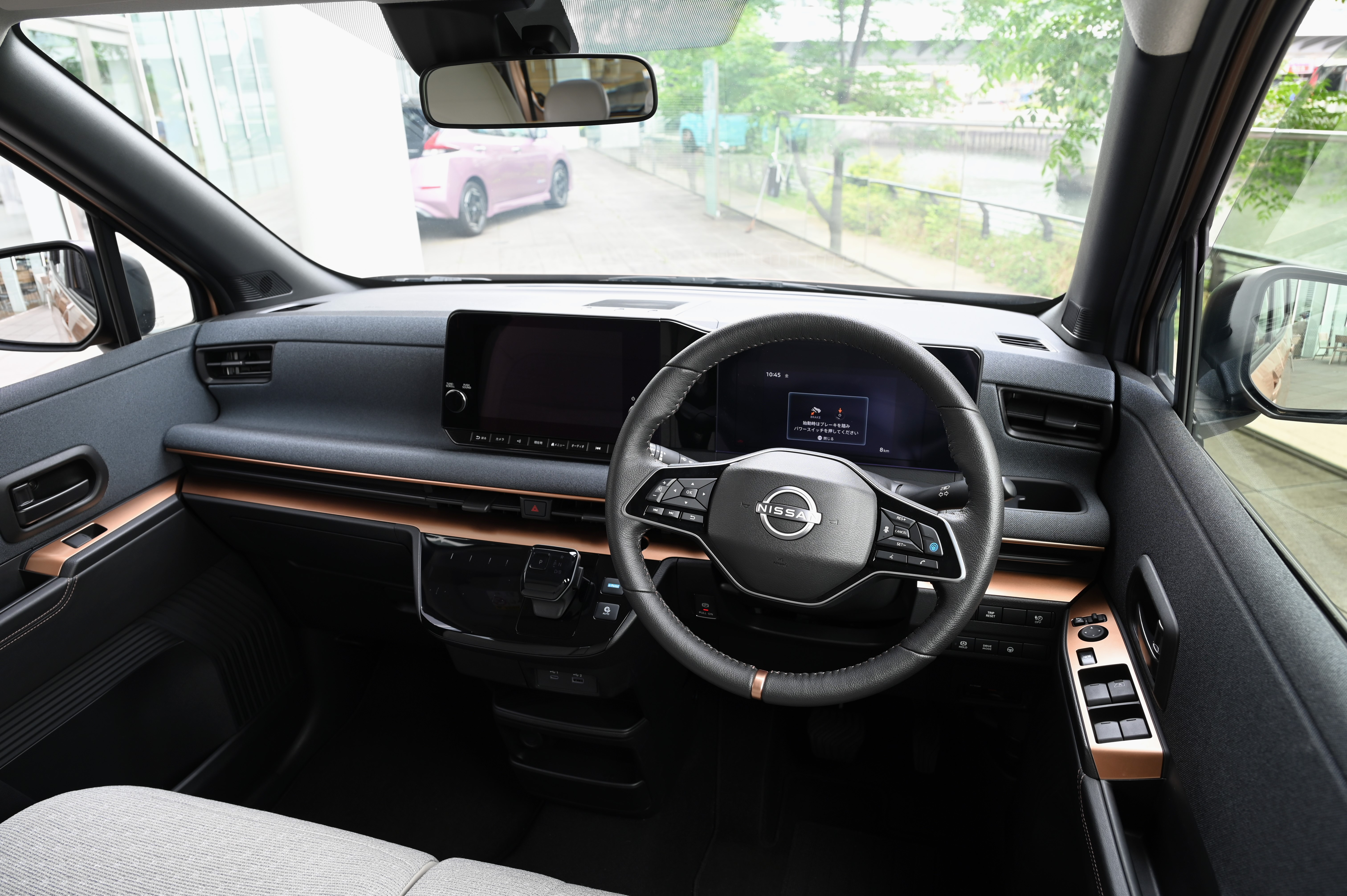
Interior

== Specifications ==
The Sakura is powered by a single electric motor with a maximum output of 47 kW (63 hp; 64 PS) and a maximum torque output of 195 N⋅m (20 kg⋅m; 144 lb⋅ft) and can reach a top speed of 130 km/h (81 mph). The battery storage consists of a 20 kWh lithium-ion unit with an estimated WLTC range of 180 km (110 mi). Grade levels available are S, X and G, with S being intended for commercial users, X being more comfortably equipped for private buyers, and the G being the most luxurious variant, with a variety of driving aids and adaptive LED headlights amongst other standard equipment. The S omits the fabric covered dashboard amongst other creature comforts, and can be recognized by its steel wheels with full wheel covers. The Sakura has been sold in Japan since May 2022.

== Awards ==
On 7 October 2022, the Sakura, along with the Ariya crossover EV, had won the 2022 Good Design Award, and was also selected as one of the judges "My Choice" items.

In December 2022, the Sakura alongside the Mitsubishi eK X EV received the 2022–2023 Japan Car of the Year award. The two were also named K Cars of the Year.

In February 2023, the Sakura received the "2022 Nikkei Excellent Products and Services Award" This is the second time a Nissan electric vehicle has received this award, the first being the Leaf in 2010.

In 2024, the Sakura, alongside the Note, and Kicks, ranked 1st in their segments in Japanese automotive performance studied by J.D. Power.

== Sales ==
Year	Japan
2022	21,887
2023	37,140
2024	22,926
2025	14,093
