= Nissan Roox =

The Nissan Roox name has been used by Nissan on a variety of OEM rebadged "tallboy" kei car vans since 2009. For one generation, it was sold as the Nissan Dayz Roox.

- 2009–2013 — Rebadged Suzuki Palette; also available as the sportier "Roox Highway Star"
- 2014–2020 — Nissan Dayz Roox – first generation Mitsubishi eK Space; also available as the sportier "Dayz Roox Highway Star"
- 2020–2025 — Second generation Mitsubishi eK Space; also available as the sportier "Roox Highway Star"
- 2025–present — Third generation Mitsubishi eK Space; also available as the sportier "Roox Highway Star"
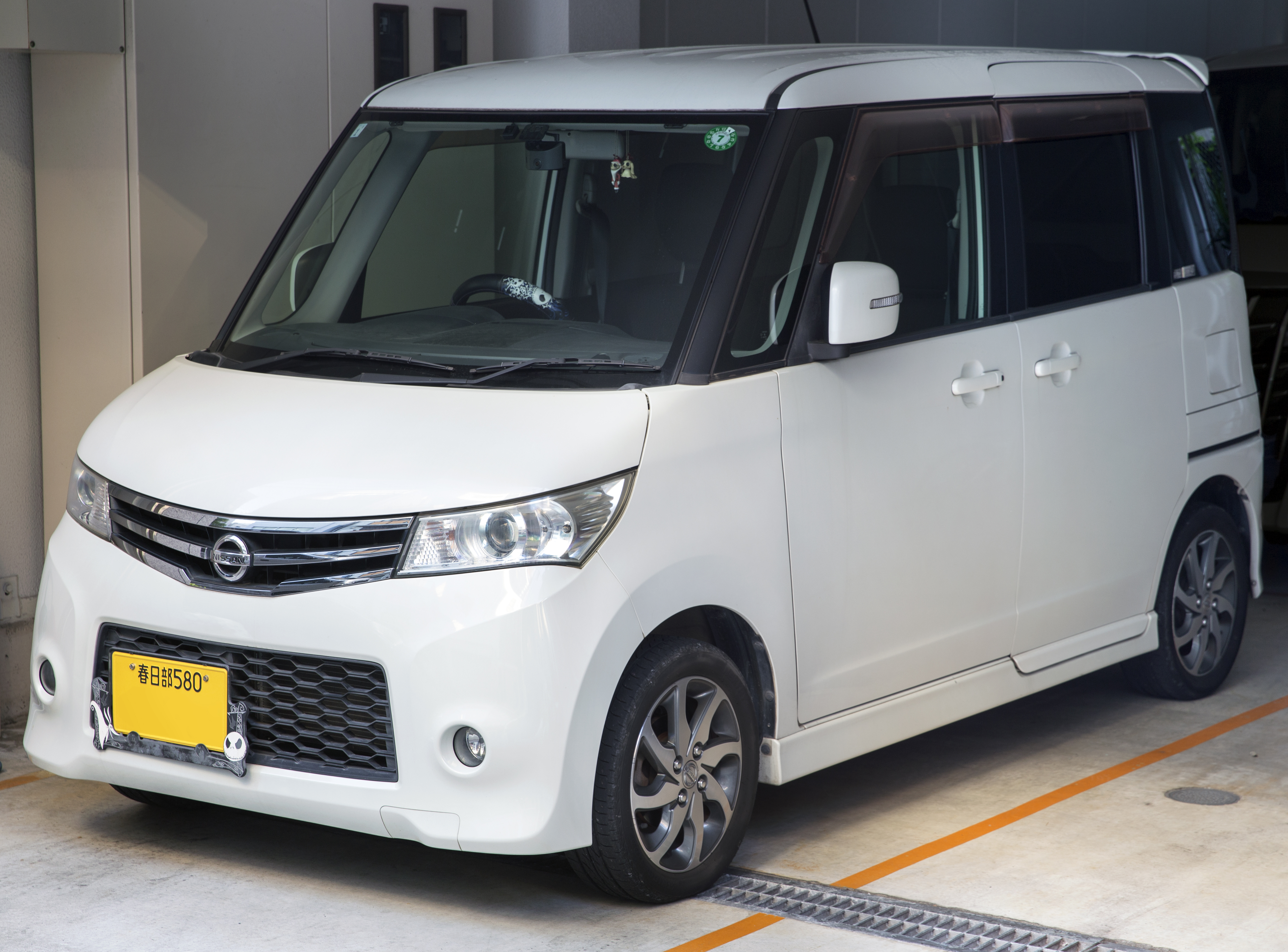
First generation Nissan Roox (2009–2013)

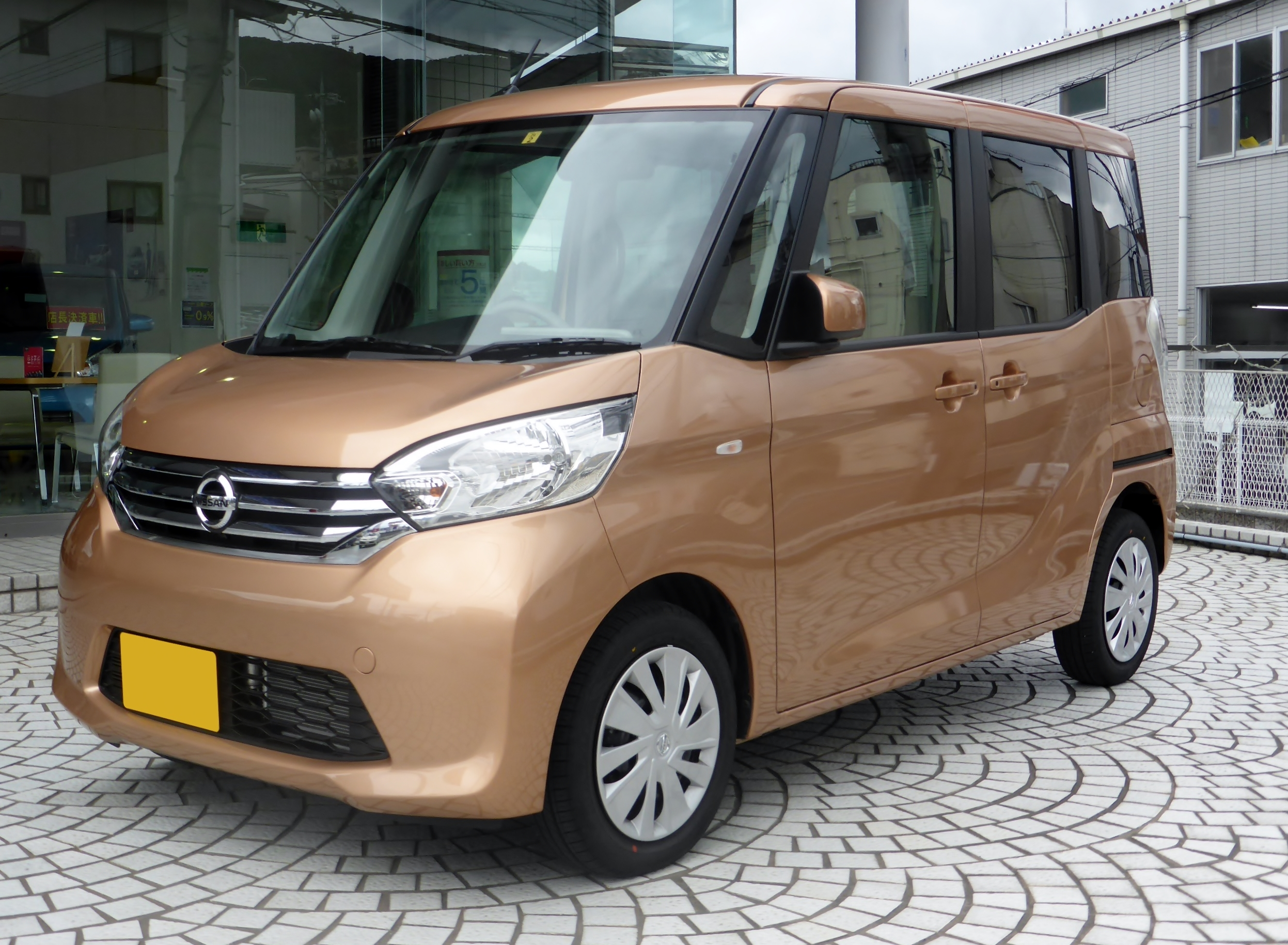
Nissan Dayz Roox (2014–2020)

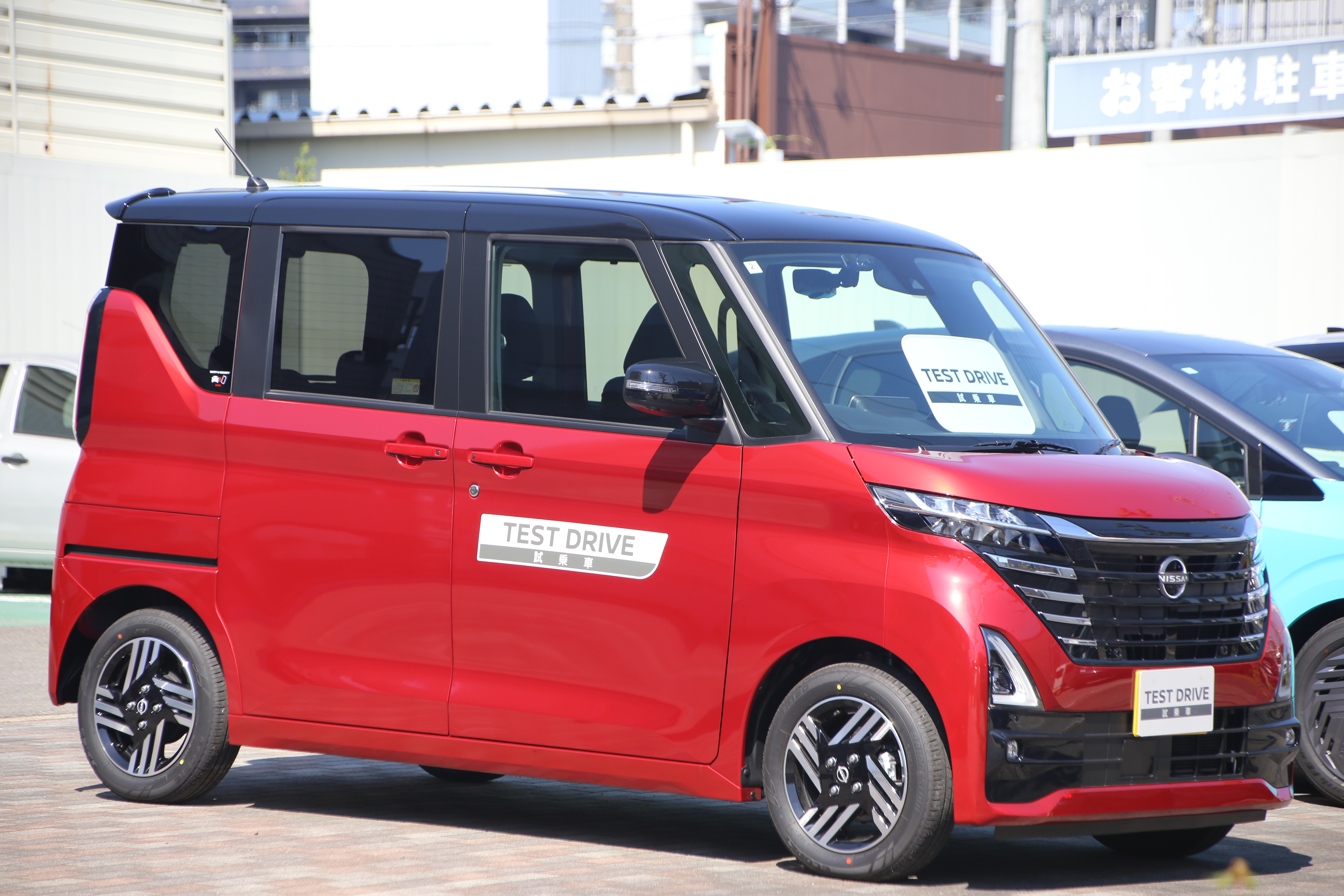
Second generation Nissan Roox (2020–2025)

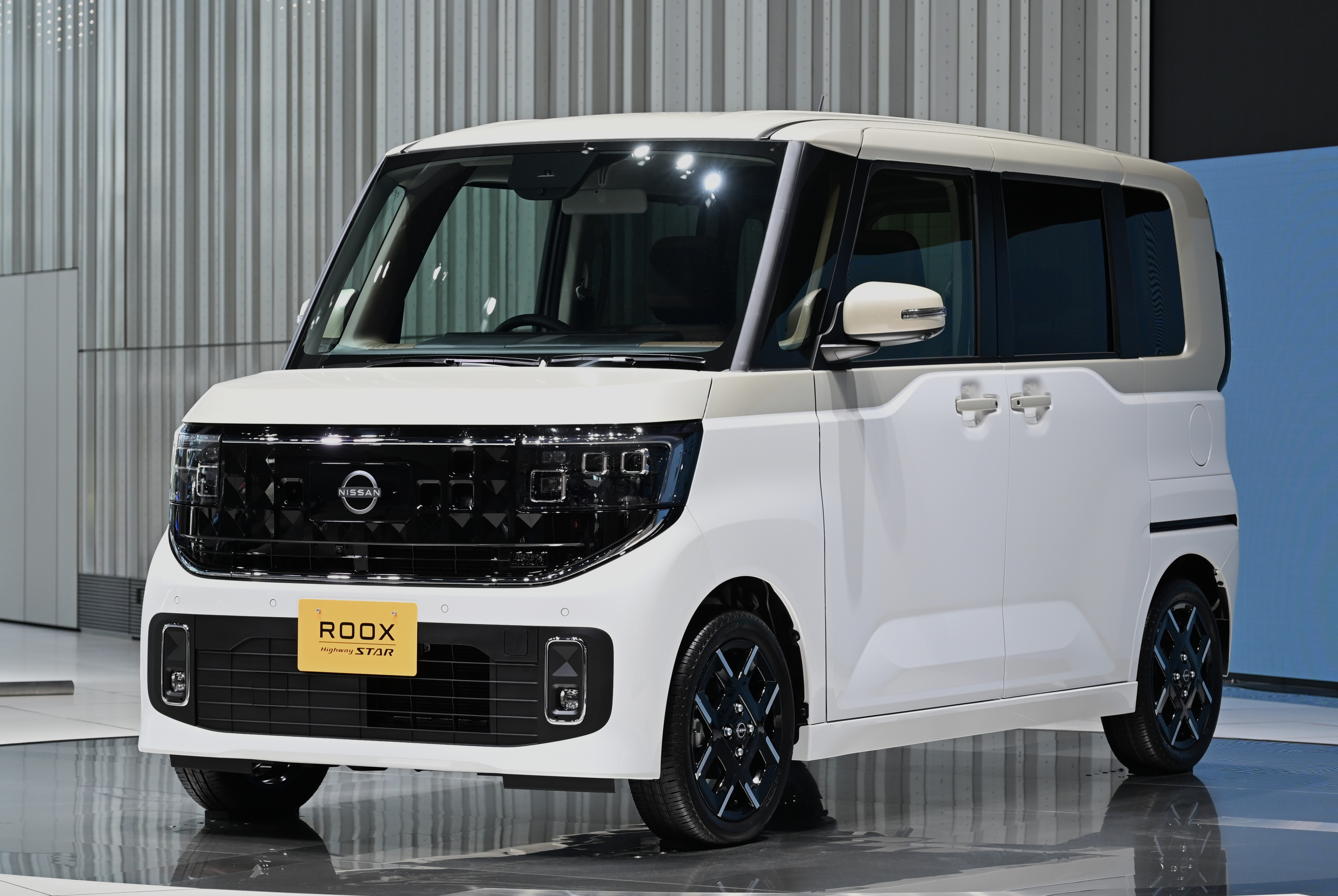
Third generation Nissan Roox (2025–present)
