= Mitsubishi Mirage =

Range of automobiles

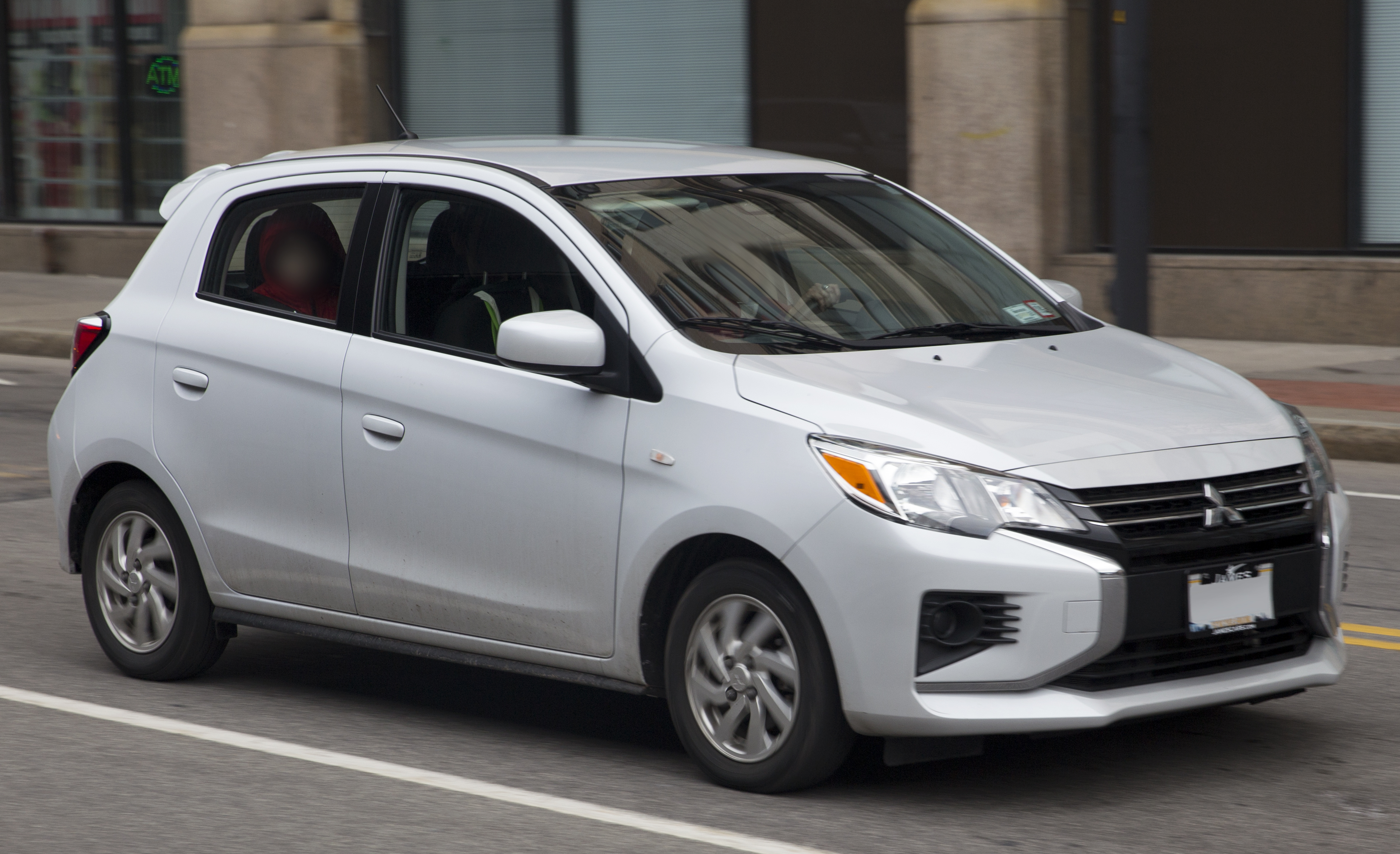
- Mitsubishi Mirage (sixth generation)

Overview
- Manufacturer: Mitsubishi Motors
- Production: 1978–2003; 2012–present

Body and chassis
- Class: Subcompact car (B) (2012–2024); Compact car (C) (1978–2003)
- Layout: Front-engine, front-wheel-drive (1978–2003, 2012–2024); Front-engine, all-wheel-drive (1983–2003)

Chronology
- Predecessor: Mitsubishi Lancer (A70) (for 1978 model); Mitsubishi Colt (Z30) (for 2012 model)
- Successor: Mitsubishi Lancer (CS) (for 1995 model)

The Mitsubishi Mirage is a range of cars produced by the Japanese manufacturer Mitsubishi from 1978 until 2003 and again from 2012 to 2024. The hatchback models produced between 1978 and 2003 were classified as subcompact cars, while the sedan and station wagon models, marketed prominently as the Mitsubishi Lancer, were the compact offerings. The liftback introduced in 1988 complemented the sedan as an additional compact offering, and the coupé of 1991 fitted in with the subcompact range. The last Mirage model is a subcompact hatchback and sedan and it replaced the Mitsubishi Colt sold between 2002 and 2012.

== Nameplate history ==
The Mirage has a complicated marketing history, with a varied and much convoluted naming convention that differed substantially depending on the market. Mitsubishi used the Mirage name for all five generations in Japan, with all but the first series badged as such in the United States. However, other markets often utilized the name Mitsubishi Colt and sedan variants of the Mirage have been widely sold as the Mitsubishi Lancer—including in Japan where the two retailed alongside one another. In Japan, the Mirage was sold at a specific retail chain called Car Plaza.

In the United States and Canada, the first four generations were sold through a venture with Chrysler as the Dodge Colt and the similar Plymouth-badged Champ and Colt. Later, the venture brought the Eagle Vista and Summit branded models which sold alongside the aforementioned. Confusingly, Chrysler has also offered an unrelated Dodge Lancer at various stages between the 1950s and 1980s. However, when DaimlerChrysler briefly controlled Mitsubishi through the DaimlerChrysler-Mitsubishi alliance from 2000 through to 2004, the license to the "Lancer" name was relinquished to Mitsubishi for usage in North America. Thus, after the fifth and final generation Mirage, replacement models in North America have adopted the new name.

Mitsubishi introduced replacements for the fifth series of Mirage, starting in 2000 with a new generation of Lancer—now larger, having moved up to the compact segment. Then in 2002, a subcompact five-door hatchback badged Colt globally became available. By 2003, the Mirage and its derivatives had been completely phased out of mainstream Japanese production. For the 2002-era Colt's replacement in 2012, Mitsubishi decided to resurrect the Mirage name internationally for a new sixth generation model.

With the rising popularity of boxy subcompact SUVs in Japan, the Mirage nameplate was used on a domestic market-only model called the Mirage Dingo, from 1999. The Dingo was facelifted in 2001 and canceled in 2003. However, New Zealand sold a very different Mirage from 2002—a rebadged Dutch-manufactured Mitsubishi Space Star labeled Mirage Space Star. This vehicle was not very popular and was discontinued in 2003.

== First generation (1978; A150) ==
First generation
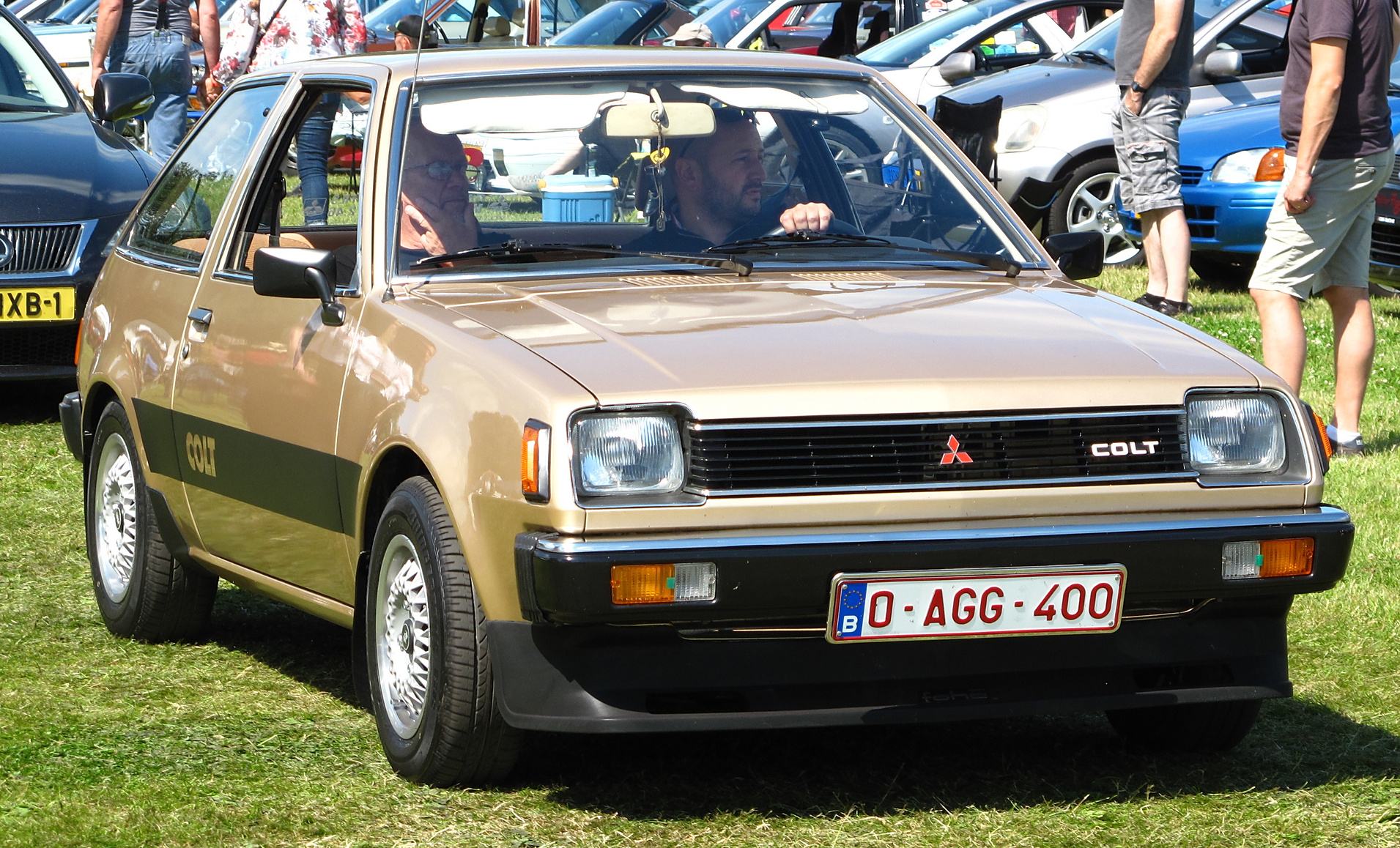
- Mitsubishi Colt 1200 3-door (Europe)

Overview
- Also called: Mitsubishi Champ; Mitsubishi Colt; Mitsubishi Lancer (sedan); Mitsubishi Lancer Fiore (sedan); Mitsubishi Magnum (Belgium); Mitsubishi Precis (Puerto Rico); Colt 1200/1400 (UK); Dodge/Plymouth Colt; Plymouth Champ
- Production: March 1978 – October 1983 (Japan); 1982–1989 (Australia)
- Assembly: Japan: Okazaki (Nagoya Plant); Australia: Clovelly Park; New Zealand: Todd Park

Body and chassis
- Body style: 3/5-door hatchback 4-door sedan
- Layout: Front-engine, front-wheel-drive

Powertrain
- Engine: 1.2 L 4G11 I4 (A151/155); 1.4 L 4G12 I4 (A152/156); 1.4 L 4G12T turbo I4 (A152/156); 1.6 L 4G32 I4 (A153/157)
- Transmission: 4-speed manual (Super Shift); 5-speed manual 3-speed automatic

Dimensions
- Wheelbase: 2,300 mm (90.6 in) (3-door); 2,380 mm (93.7 in) (4/5-door)
- Length: 3,790–3,805 mm (149.2–149.8 in) (3-door); 3,895–3,930 mm (153.3–154.7 in) (5-door); 4,105–4,135 mm (161.6–162.8 in) (4-door)
- Width: 1,585 mm (62.4 in) (3/5-door); 1,590 mm (62.6 in) (4-door)
- Height: 1,345–1,350 mm (53.0–53.1 in)
- Curb weight: 760–900 kg (1,676–1,984 lb)

Mitsubishi launched the Mirage as a front-wheel drive three-door hatchback in March 1978, as a response to the 1973 oil crisis. A five-door hatchback on a longer wheelbase arrived in September. Since most overseas markets did not have the Minica kei car, the Mirage was usually sold as Mitsubishi's entry-level model. Chassis codes were from A151 to 153 for the three-doors, with A155 and up used for the longer five-door version.

Mirage featured four-wheel independent suspension, rack and pinion steering, plus front disc brakes. Power initially came from 1,244 and 1410 cc iterations of the familiar Orion engine, putting out 72 and 82 PS (53 and 60 kW), respectively. Of particular note, the 1410 cc variant featured "modulated displacement"—a system that could shut down cylinders under cruising or idle conditions to reduce fuel consumption. Mitsubishi added the moderately more powerful 1.6-liter Saturn engine to the range in March 1979, for the 88 PS (65 kW) 1600 GT model.

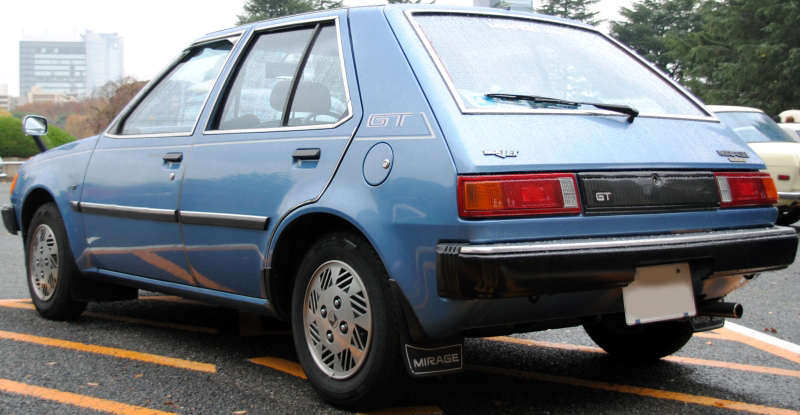
Mitsubishi Mirage 5-door (pre-facelift; Japan)

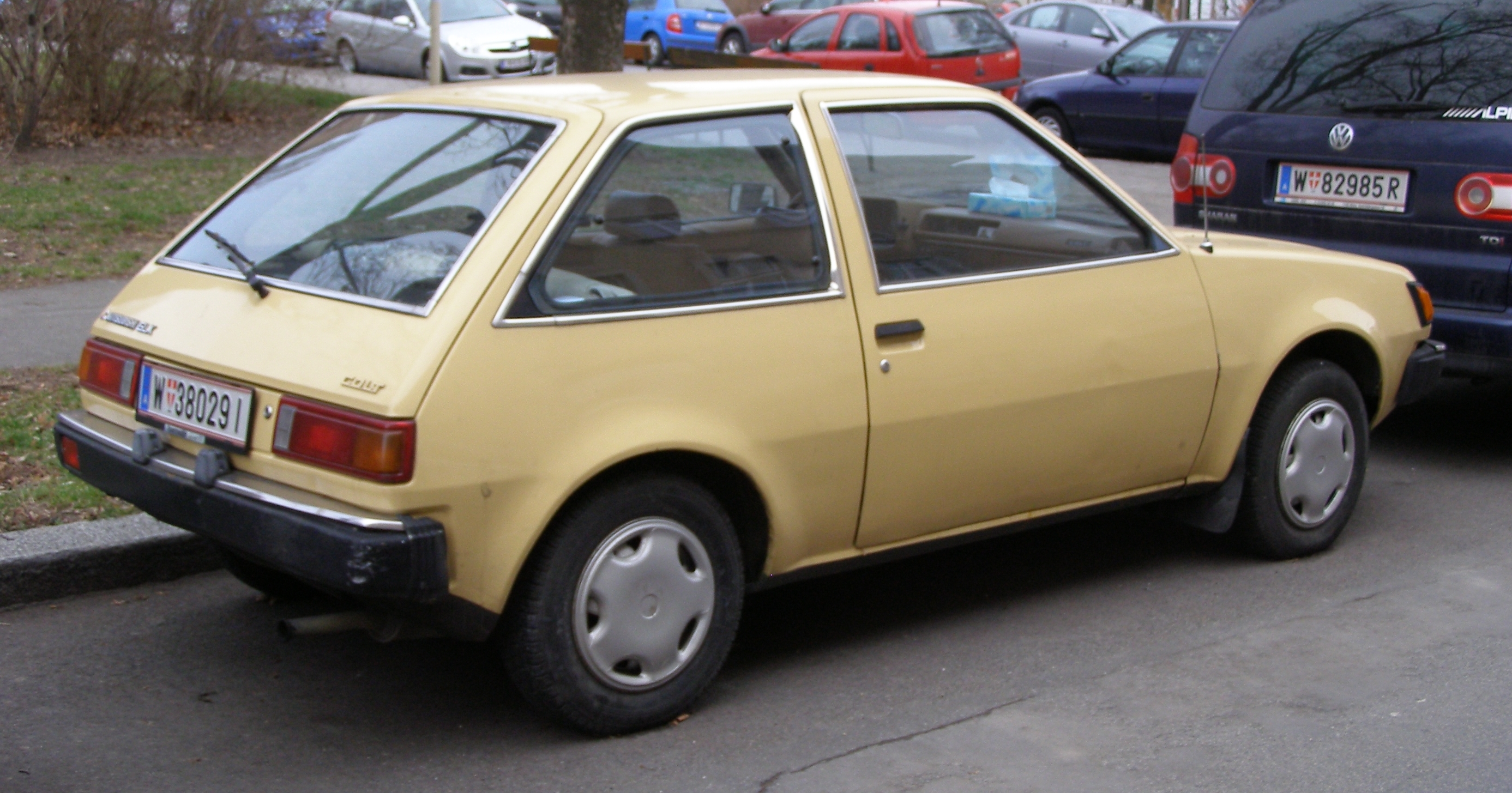
Mitsubishi Colt 3-door (pre-facelift; Europe)

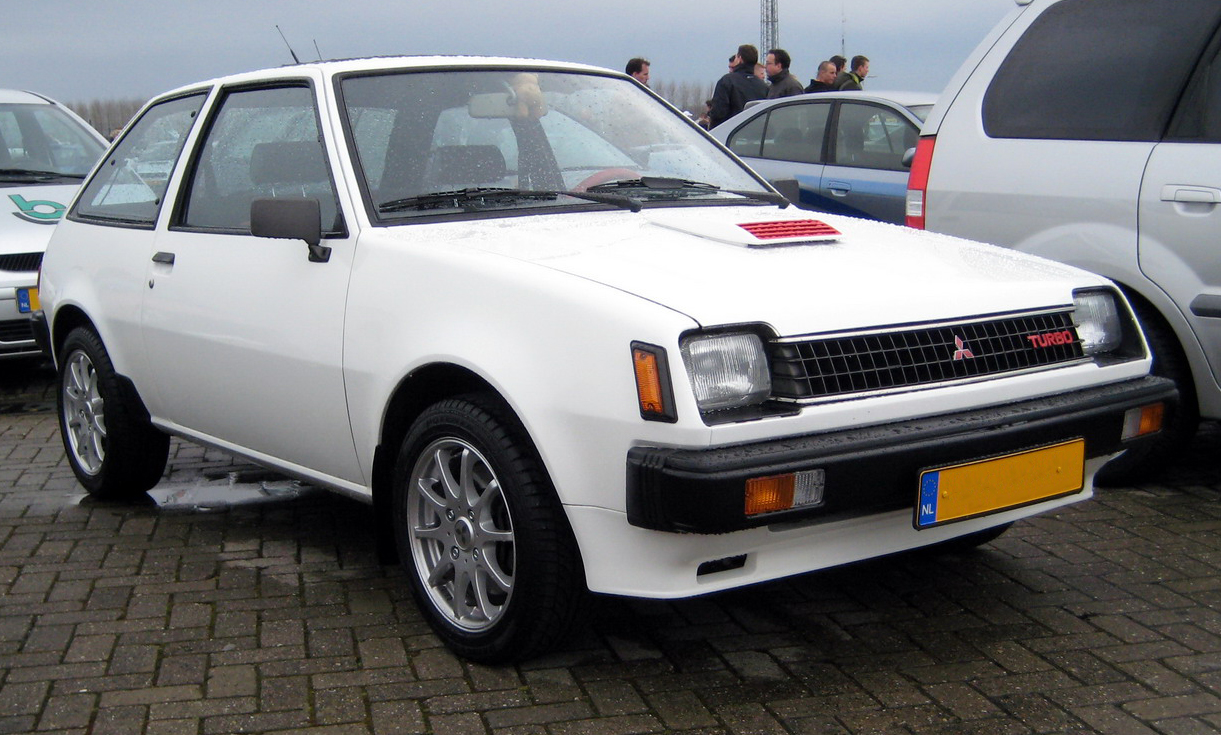
Colt Turbo A150 (Europe)

The Mirage also debuted Mitsubishi's Super Shift transmission, a four-speed manual with a second lever for "low" and "high" range; effectively making the transmission an eight-speed unit. The Super Shift was not originally planned. However, Mitsubishi engineers had to make use of the existing Orion engine designed for rear-wheel drive applications making use of the longitudinal engine orientation. In the Mirage, sizing constraints as a result of the front-wheel drive layout required the engine to be mounted transversely, thus causing the carburetor to face forwards and run into icing issues. However, the primary implication of the Mirage's powertrain orientation — and the issue that demanded the unconventional transmission — was the mounting of the transmission beneath the engine. This required the gearbox to take power down from the clutch, an action not possible directly as this would have dictated that the gearbox rotate in the opposite direction to that required. To overcome this, the use of an extra "idle" transfer shaft was necessitated. It was subsequently realized that for a cost no more than developing a new five-speed transmission, this shaft could be modified as a separate two-speed gearbox controlled by a secondary shift lever mounted alongside the main lever inside the cabin. The ratios on this transfer transmission were, in effect, "underdrives"—consequently marked on the second shift lever as a "power" mode due to increased performance granted by the lower gearing. In contrast, the higher overdrive setting was noted as "economy". Mitsubishi called this a unique selling proposition.

=== Facelift ===
In February 1982, Mitsubishi facelifted the Mirage range. Distinguished by the installation of flusher fitting headlamps that extended into the fender panels, stylists also designed a new grille insert. The tail lights were larger, new firmer engine and transmission mounts were fitted, and a new, lighter and more rigid transmission case was developed. The dashboard was also updated, with rotating "satellite" buttons mounted within fingertip reach for light and wiper functions. Another new version for the Japanese market was the 1600SX, a well-equipped five-door automatic fitted with the 1600GT's 88-PS engine.

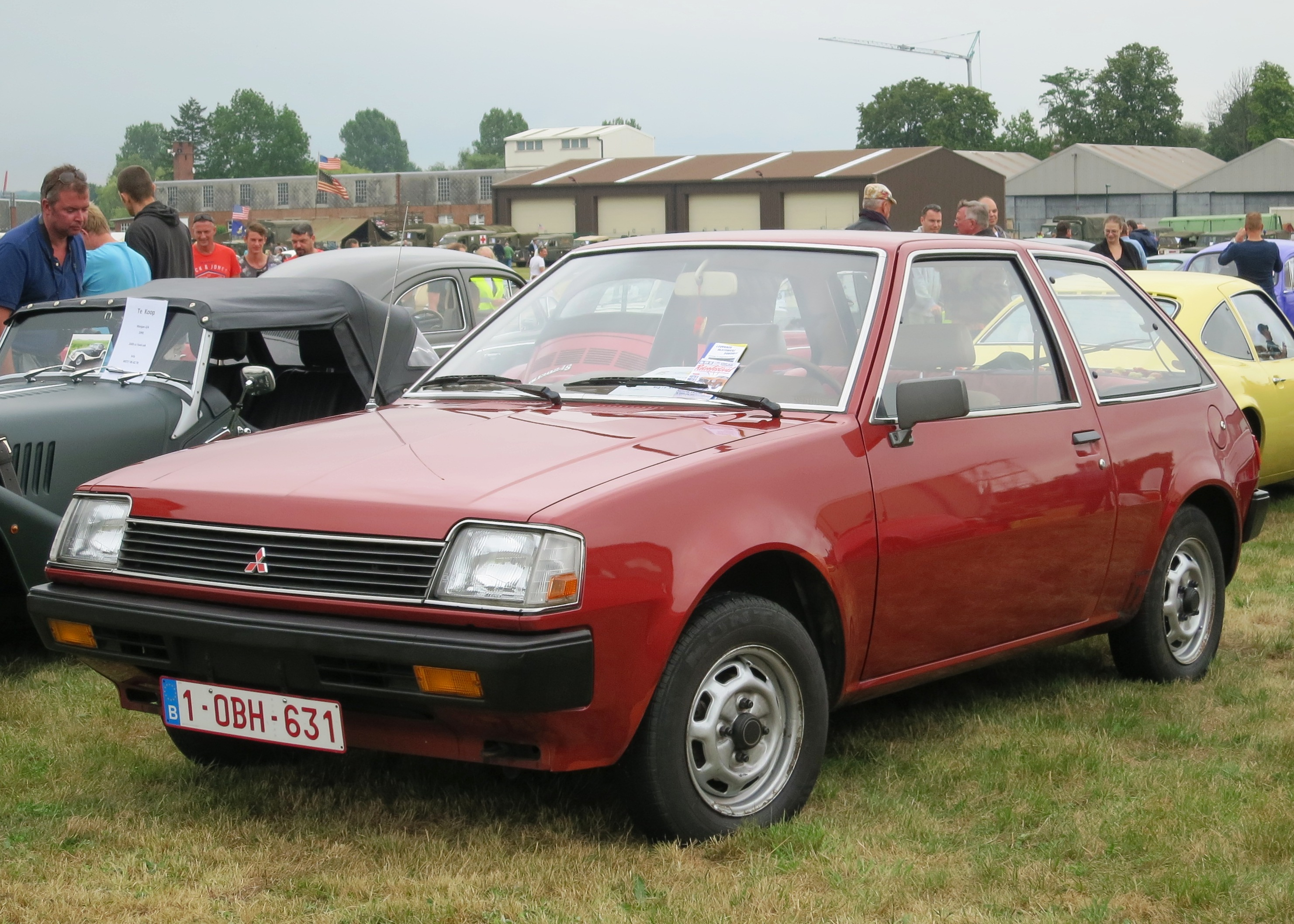
Colt hatchback (facelift)

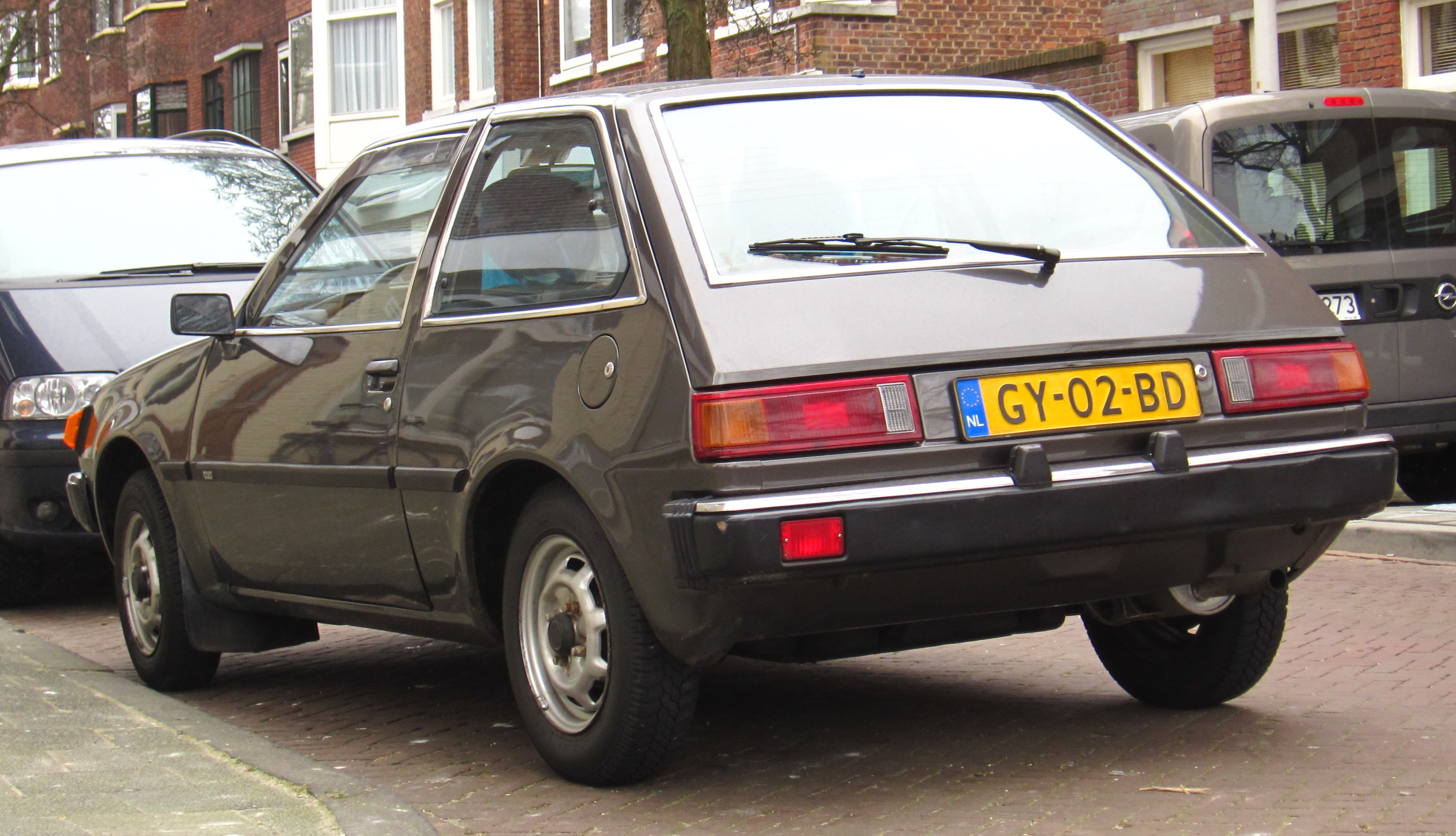
Colt hatchback (facelift)

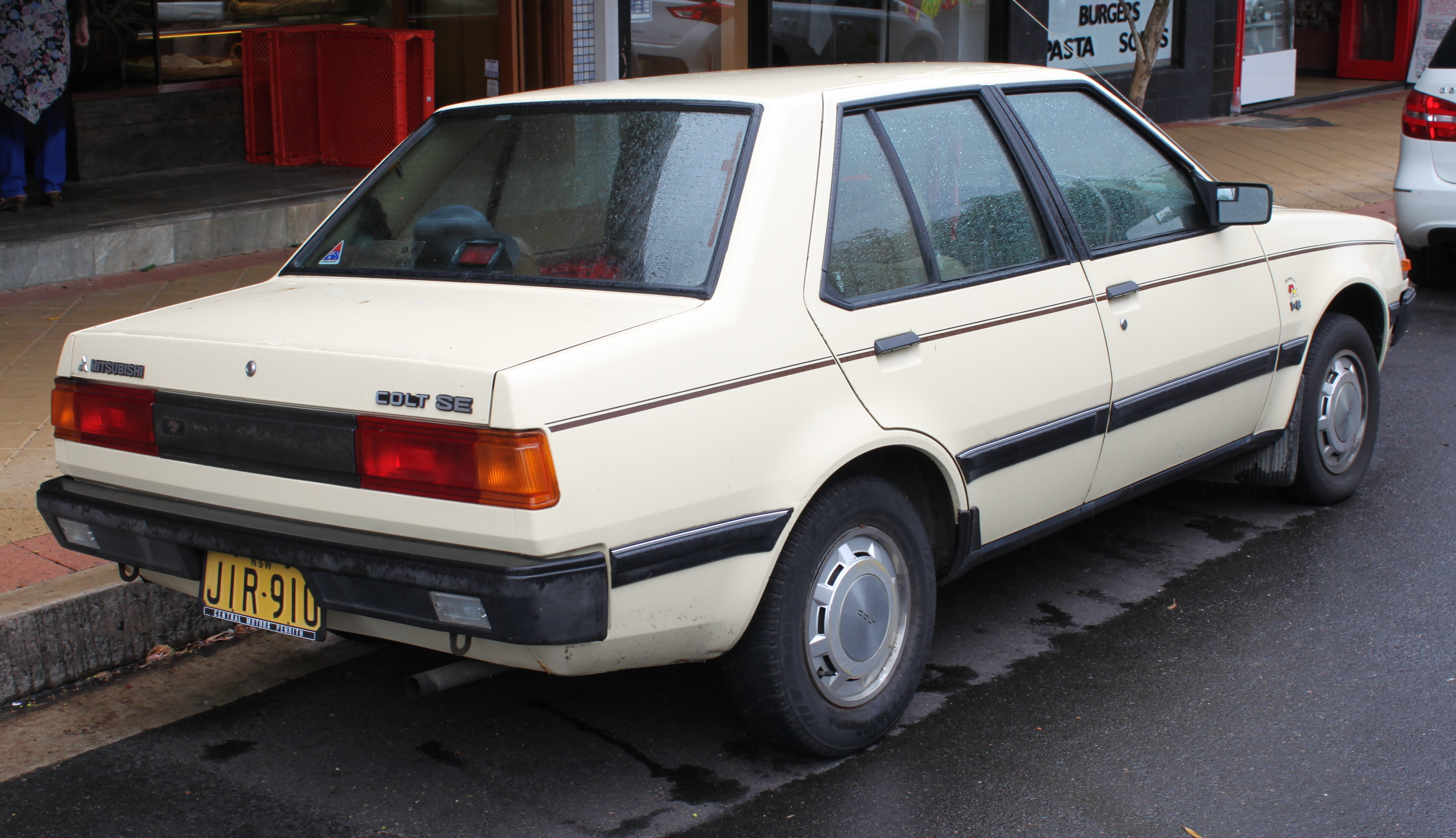
Colt sedan (facelift)

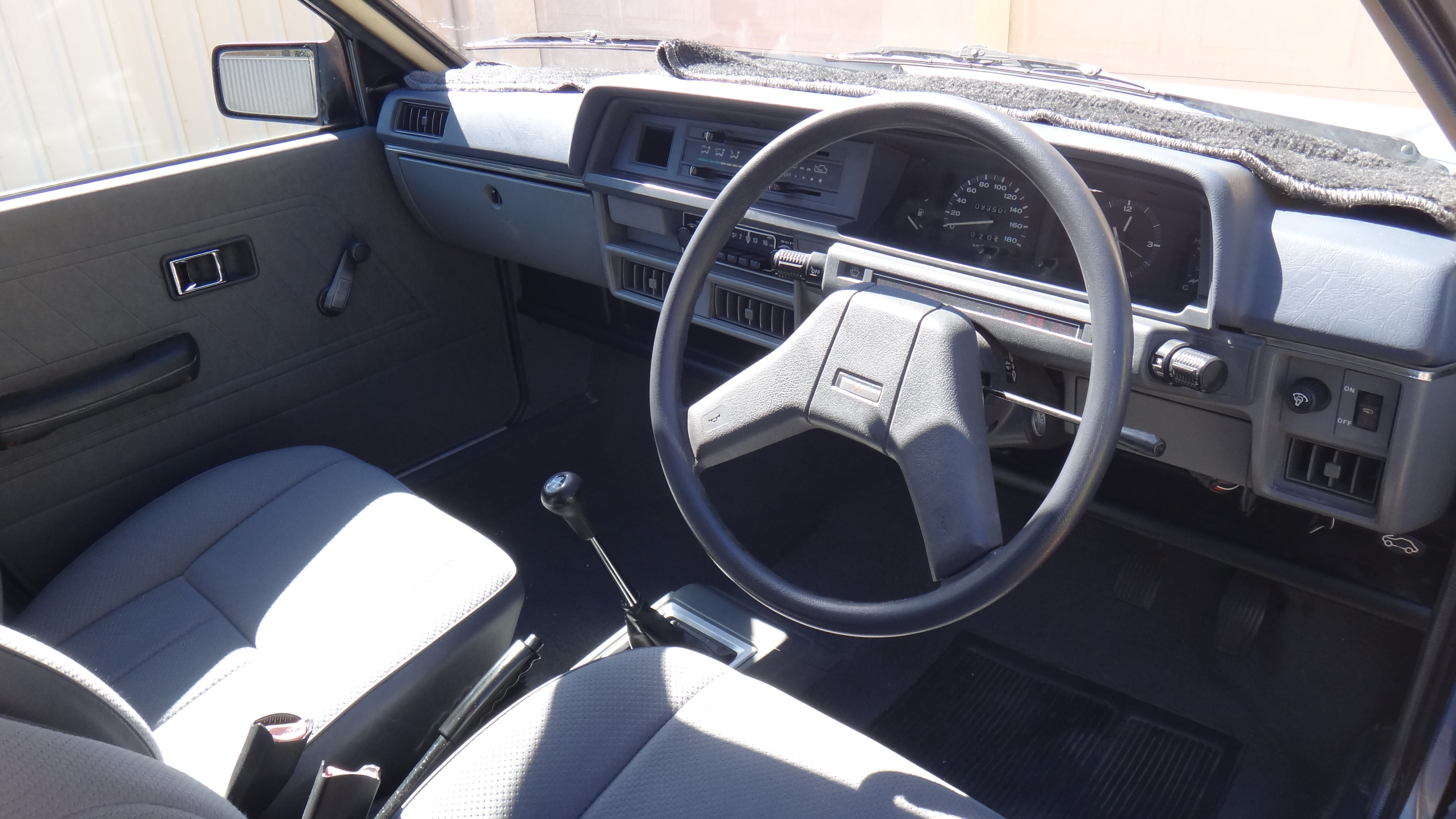
Interior

At the same time as this facelift, Mitsubishi introduced a four-door sedan variant to Japan under the names Mirage Saloon and Lancer Fiore, which is not to be confused with the unrelated regular Lancer. The Fiore was often abbreviated to Lancer or Lancer F in international markets, eschewing the "Fiore" suffix. The sedan's backseat folded in a 60/40 split, just as for the hatchback. With Mirage hatchback and sedan sales in Japan restricted to the Car Plaza dealerships, the Fiore was intended to duplicate the Mirage's success at the Galant Shop — Mitsubishi's second retail sales channel. Lancer Fiore received the same 1.2- and 1.4-liter engines, and as a Mirage-derived model line, was substantially smaller than the strict Lancer. Apart from the wider axle track dictated by the switch to front-wheel drive, the original 1973-era Lancer offered a similar dimensional footprint. Unique to the four-door saloons was Mitsubishi's new "Modulated Displacement" (MD) engine, a short-lived technology which allowed the engine to run on only two cylinders while under light loads so as to save on petrol. The valves to cylinders 1 and 4 were disabled by means of hydraulic activators at low speeds and low loads.

A more sporting turbocharged 105 PS (77 kW) version of the 1.4-liter engine was made available in Japan from the time of the facelift as the 1400 GT Turbo, originally only in the three-door hatchback. To handle the additional power, the suspension was made firmer, the brake servo was upgraded, and the driveshaft was changed to an equal-length design featuring a central bearing. The small turbocharger, of Mitsubishi's own manufacture, unusually sat between the intake and the twin-barrel carburetor. The engine was equipped with a knock sensor, enabling it to run on petrols of various octane ratings. The compression ratio was also unusual, fairly high for its time at 8.7 to 1. The Turbo also used the twin-range Super Shift transmission. In Japan, the Turbo was also available with the five-door hatchback bodywork, a version that was rarely exported (if at all). Japanese buyers could also opt for the new turbocharged Lancer Fiore/Mirage Saloon 1400GT; all three of these turbo versions arrived in August 1982. Mitsubishi distinguished the 1400GT with a hood mounted air intake, unique interior, uprated suspension and brakes, and the equalization of the drive shaft lengths to reduce torque steering.

In October 1982, the 1200EX Special (hatchbacks) and 1200EL Special (saloons) were launched in Japan; these were well equipped low-cost versions with heated rear windshields and other extras. The 1400MD Super and Marie limited editions were launched in December 1982. Japanese manufacture of all body variants ended in October 1983.

=== North America ===
Chrysler imported this generation of Mirage to the North America as the Dodge Colt and Plymouth Champ from late-1978 for the 1979 model year, in three-door form only until the 1982 model year when the five-door was added. Then from the 1983 model year, Plymouth retired the Champ and adopted the name Colt as well. 0-60 time was over 12 seconds, and the top speed was 90 MPH. The Mirage Turbo was sold as the Plymouth Colt GTS Turbo, only as a two-door hatchback and fitted with a fuel-injected 1.6-litre 4G32T engine which reappeared in the next-generation Colt.

=== Australia and New Zealand ===
The facelifted model was also manufactured as the Colt by Mitsubishi Motors Australia at their Clovelly Park, South Australia plant from 1982 to late 1989, with sufficient inventory stockpiled not exhausting until 1990. Initially offered with the 1.4- and 1.6-liter engines in five-door hatchback form, the sedan was produced from 1984.

Australian Colts were given model codes RA (from November 1980), RB (October 1982), RC (April 1984), RD (October 1986), and RE (September 1988). The RE update was distinguished by revised wheel covers, body side projection mouldings, and grille, plus the addition of body colour bumpers. The SE model was dropped, with the range opening up with the fleet-focused XL hatchback with the 1.4-litre engine and a four-speed manual gearbox, stepping up to the 1.6-litre, GLX hatchback and sedan with five-speed manual or optional three-speed automatic.

This model was also briefly exported to New Zealand in the late 1980s, where it shared showroom space with the locally assembled third generation models. Previously, local complete knock down (CKD) assembly of the Colt took place in Petone, Wellington under contract through Todd Motor Corporation (the NZ, Mitsubishi assembly franchise holders), including a variant called the Mirage Panther. The four-door saloon version (known elsewhere as Lancer Fiore) was sold as the "Mirage Geneva" in New Zealand.

=== Europe ===
Many export markets, such as Europe and Australia received the Mirage under the Mitsubishi Colt name. In the United Kingdom, where Colt was the marque itself, it was called the Colt 1200 and Colt 1400, after the engine displacements. Sometimes it was called the Colt Hatchback 1200/1400 to help distinguish it from the rest of the Colt Car range. In most of Europe, it was sold as the Mitsubishi Colt. The Lancer Fiore (sometimes called Lancer F) arrived in early 1983, which is also when the facelift appeared in Europe. European market models usually have the 1200 or the 1400 engine with a single, twin-choke, downdraught carburettor, with 55 or 70 PS (40 or 51 kW; 54 or 69 bhp) on tap. Max power was reached at 5000 rather than 5500 rpm for the Japanese market models, and they were fitted with somewhat gentler cams for a less peaky power delivery. Some European markets also received the 105 PS (77 kW) Turbo model, which arrived in late 1982. After the introduction of the second generation Mirage/Colt, the original model remained available in Belgium (at least) as the "Mitsubishi Magnum", only offered as a three-door with the smallest engine and bare-bones equipment.

== Second generation (1983; C10/30) ==
Second generation
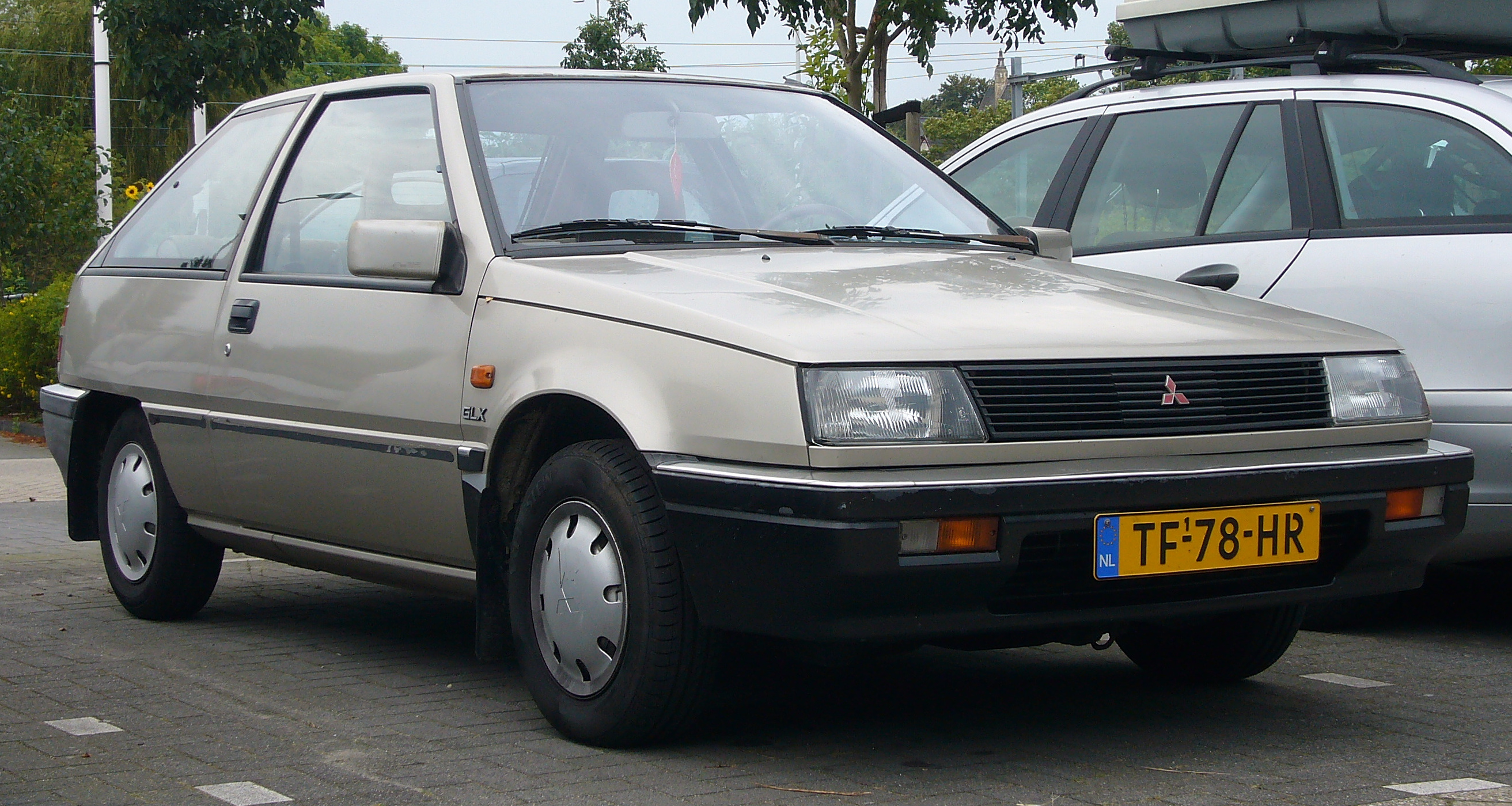
- Mitsubishi Mirage 3-door hatchback (first facelift)

Overview
- Also called: Mitsubishi Champ (Thailand); Mitsubishi Colt (hatchback); Mitsubishi Express (van); Mitsubishi Lancer; Mitsubishi Lancer Fiore (sedan); Proton Saga (Malaysia)
- Production: 1983.10–1987.10 (hatchback); 1983.10–1988.01 (sedan); 1985.02–1992.05 (wagon/van); 1983–1994 (Thailand)
- Assembly: Japan: Okazaki (Nagoya Plant); Philippines: Cainta (Chrysler Philippines Corporation); Thailand: Laem Chabang (MMTh); Indonesia: Pademangan, North Jakarta (PT. Krama Yudha Kesuma Motor); New Zealand: Wellington

Body and chassis
- Body style: 3/5-door hatchback 4-door sedan 5-door station wagon 5-door panel van
- Layout: Front-engine, front-wheel-drive Front-engine, four-wheel-drive
- Related: Dodge/Plymouth Colt; Eagle Vista; Proton Saga; Hyundai Excel

Powertrain
- Engine: Gasoline: 1198 cc 4G16 I4 (C15); 1298 cc 4G13 I4 (C11); 1439 cc 4G33 I4 (C16, Indonesia); 1468 cc 4G15 I4 (C12); 1499 cc G31B I4 (C18); 1597 cc 4G32 I4 (C13); 1597 cc 4G32T turbo I4 (C13); 1755 cc 4G37 I4 (C37); Diesel: 1795 cc 4D65 I4 (C14/C34)
- Transmission: 4-speed manual (Super Shift); 5-speed manual 3-speed automatic

Dimensions
- Wheelbase: 2,380 mm (93.7 in)
- Length: 3,870–3,995 mm (152.4–157.3 in) (hatchback); 4,125–4,210 mm (162.4–165.7 in) (sedan); 4,135–4,185 mm (162.8–164.8 in) (wagon)
- Width: 1,620–1,635 mm (63.8–64.4 in)
- Height: 1,360–1,460 mm (53.5–57.5 in)
- Curb weight: 775–1,110 kg (1,709–2,447 lb)

Mitsubishi launched the second generation Mirage to Japan in 1983, again splitting the range into Mirage (three- and five-door hatchback, plus four-door sedan) and Lancer Fiore (four-door sedan) models. A station wagon version of the Mirage was added in 1985, with a four-wheel drive wagon available from the fall of 1986 with the 1.8-liter gasoline engine. Many export markets sold the hatchbacks as Mirage or Colt, with the sedan and wagon commonly badged Lancer. This wagon model went on to become very popular in both the commercial and private sectors overseas as well as in Japan. C10-series chassis numbers denote front-wheel-drive models, while C30-series numbers are for four-wheel-drive versions (only station wagons). Uprated engines were deployed into the series; 1.3- and 1.5-liter Orion gasoline engines replaced the previous 1.2- and 1.4-liter Orion units. Mitsubishi also released variants fitted with the 1.6 and 1.8-liter Sirius gasoline powerplants, and for the first time a 1.8-liter Sirius diesel was added. The 1.6-liter Sirius engine also included a turbocharged variant with between 105 PS (77 kW) and 125 PS (92 kW), featuring the latest in computer control engine technology including electronic fuel injection. Power differed for cars with catalyzers, or for markets with lower octane fuel. Some European markets received a smaller 1.2-liter "tax special" as well, with 55 PS (40 kW).

The car received a very mild facelift in early 1986, along with some new engine options for the Japanese domestic market. This included a fuel-injected version of a new 1.5-liter engine from the Saturn family, the G31B. The transmissions were updated at the same time. In October 1986, the sedans and hatchbacks were rebadged "Mirage NOW" for the Japanese market. The change included better equipment and a revised lineup, going from the basic XF via the better equipped XL to the mildly sporty X1 X on top. The X1 X featured an Italvolanti steering wheel and alloy wheels by Porsche Design. Also new was the competitively priced and comprehensively equipped Marion version, only available in the three-door body with the 1.3-liter engine, aimed specifically at young female buyers. Meanwhile, the Van received additional safety equipment such as a laminated front windshield and ELR belts, while the 1500 CX Wagon gained power steering and bronze window tint. The second generation Mirage hatchback was replaced in October 1987; the sedans were replaced in January 1988.

The Wagon and Van versions were kept in production with some minor updates until 1991, as there was no station wagon of the third generation Mirage and Lancer. The diesel engine remained the 1.8-liter 4D65 (also available with four-wheel drive) while the petrol 4G13 and 4G15 were updated with the same new twelve-valve heads as were used on the third generation Mirage beginning in 1989. Power outputs climbed by 12 horsepower for both petrol versions, to 79 and 85 PS (58 and 63 kW) in Japanese trim.

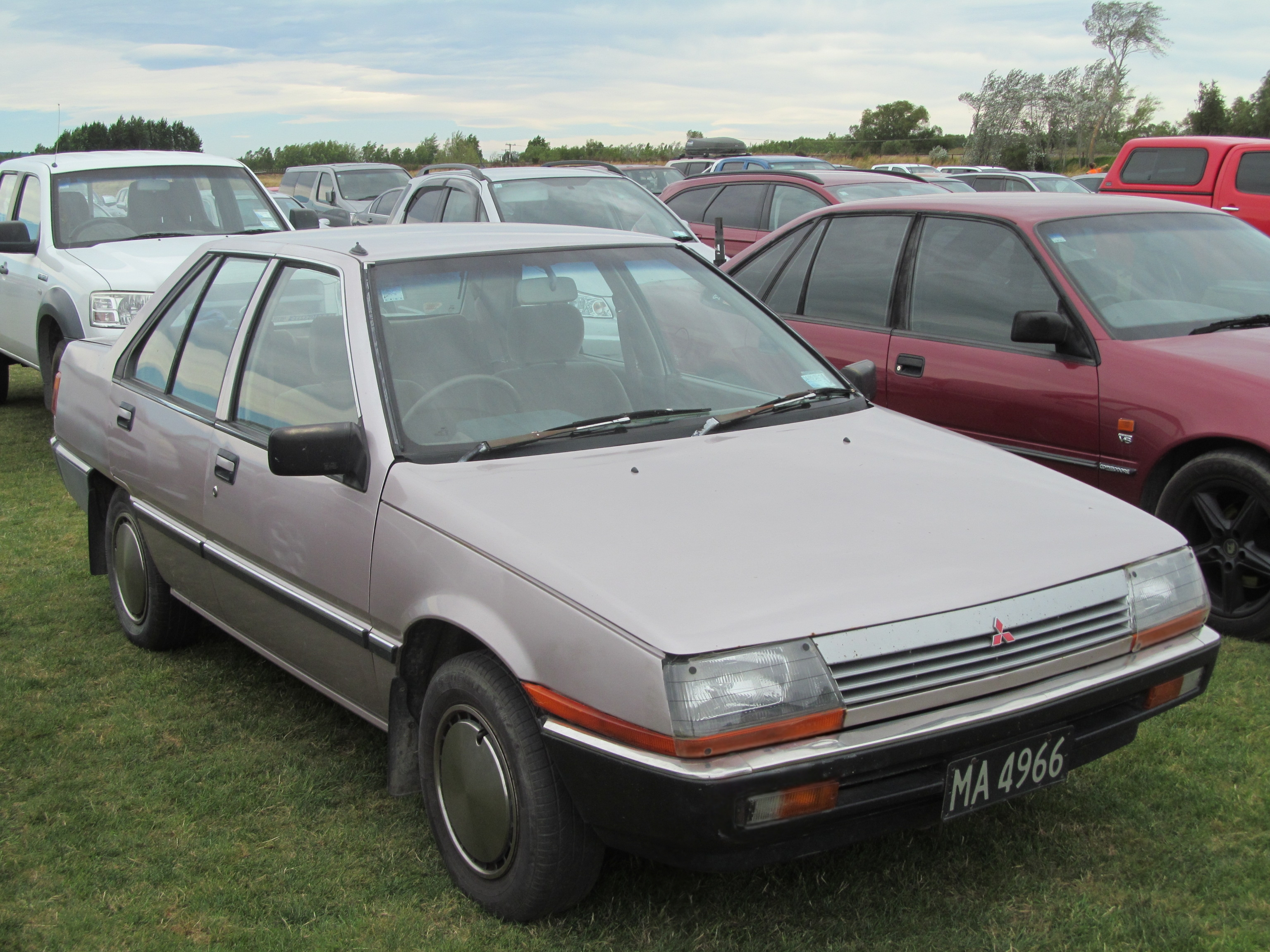
Lancer sedan (pre-facelift)

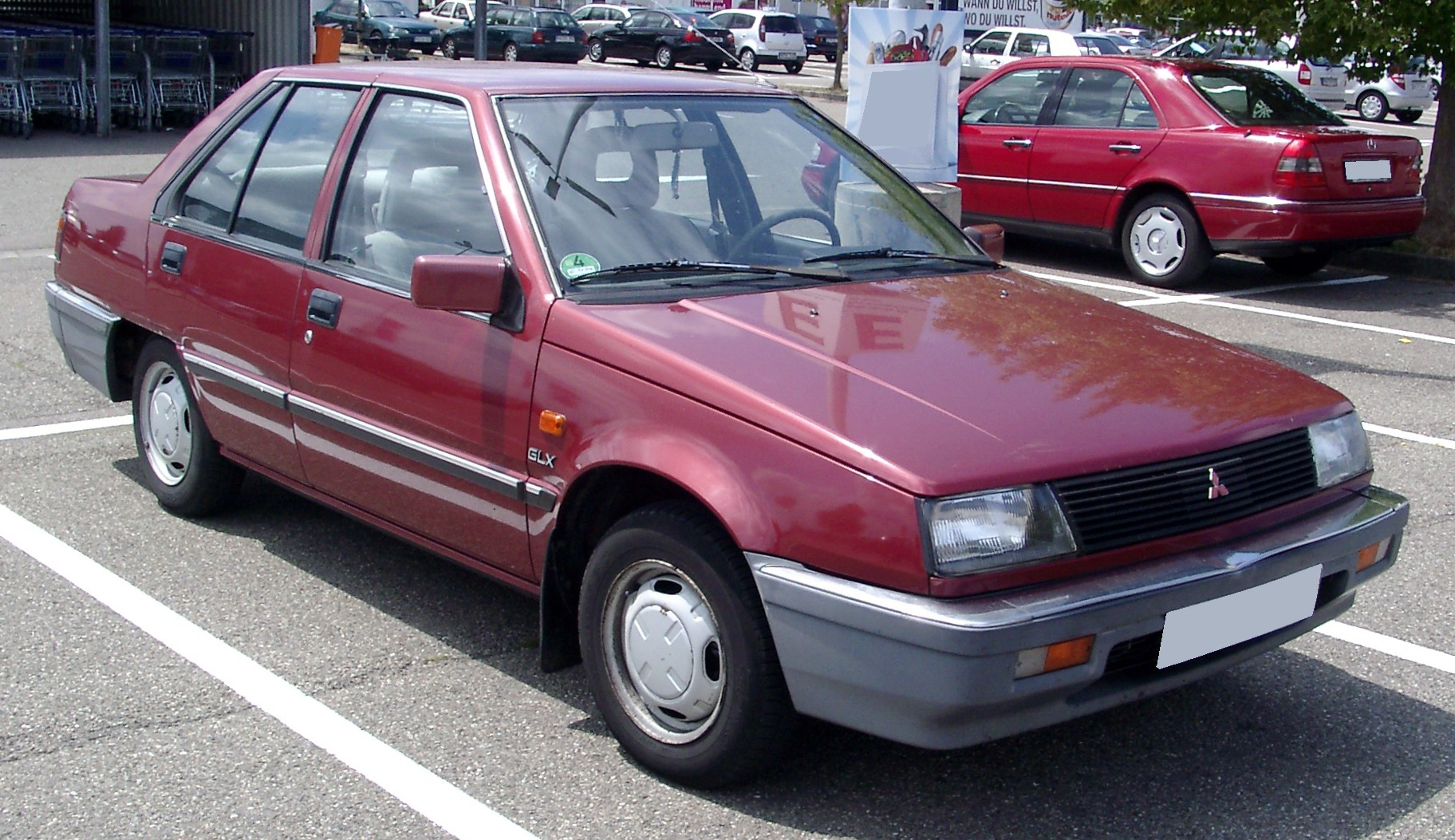
Lancer sedan (first facelift)

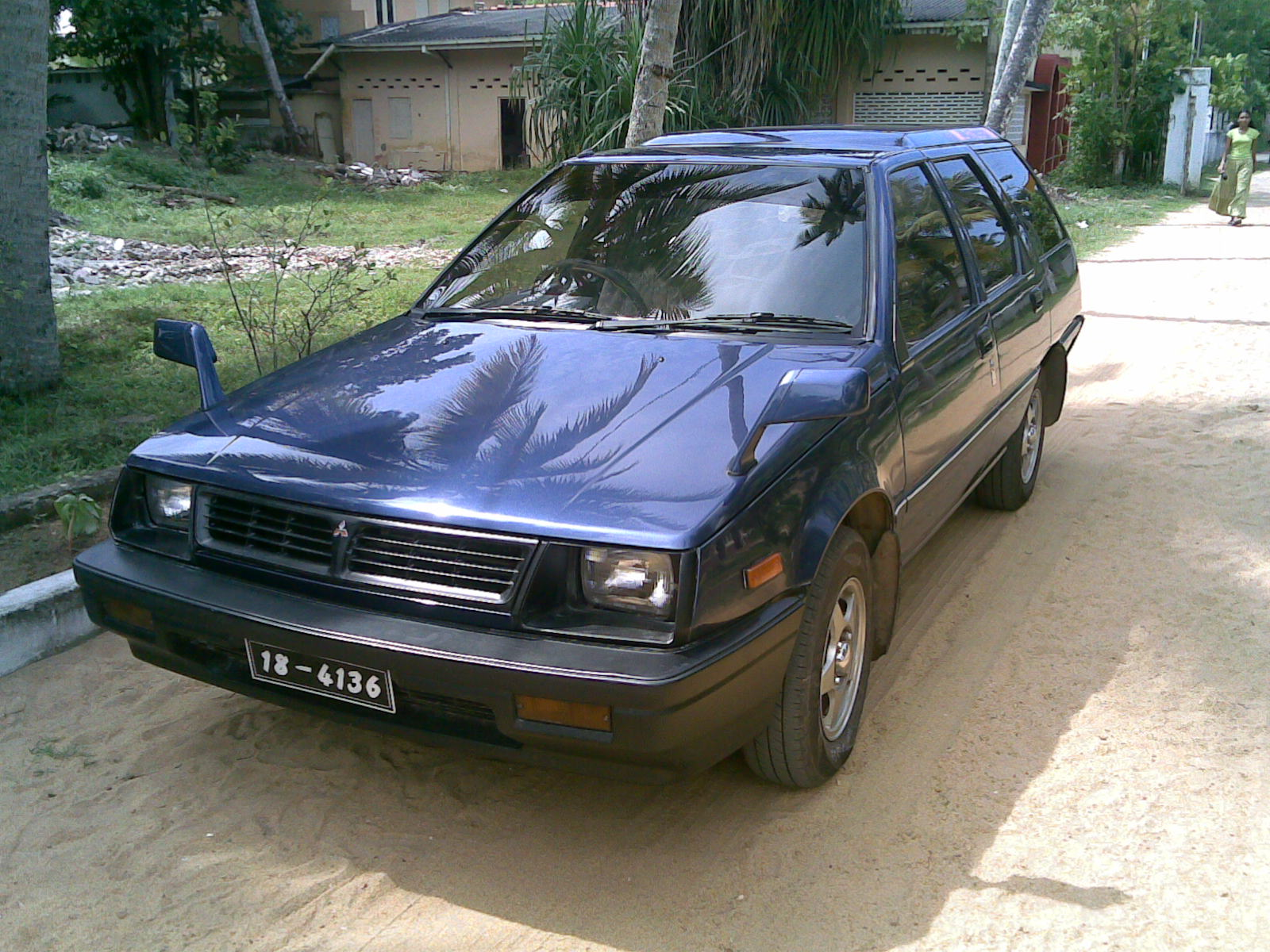
Lancer van (second facelift)

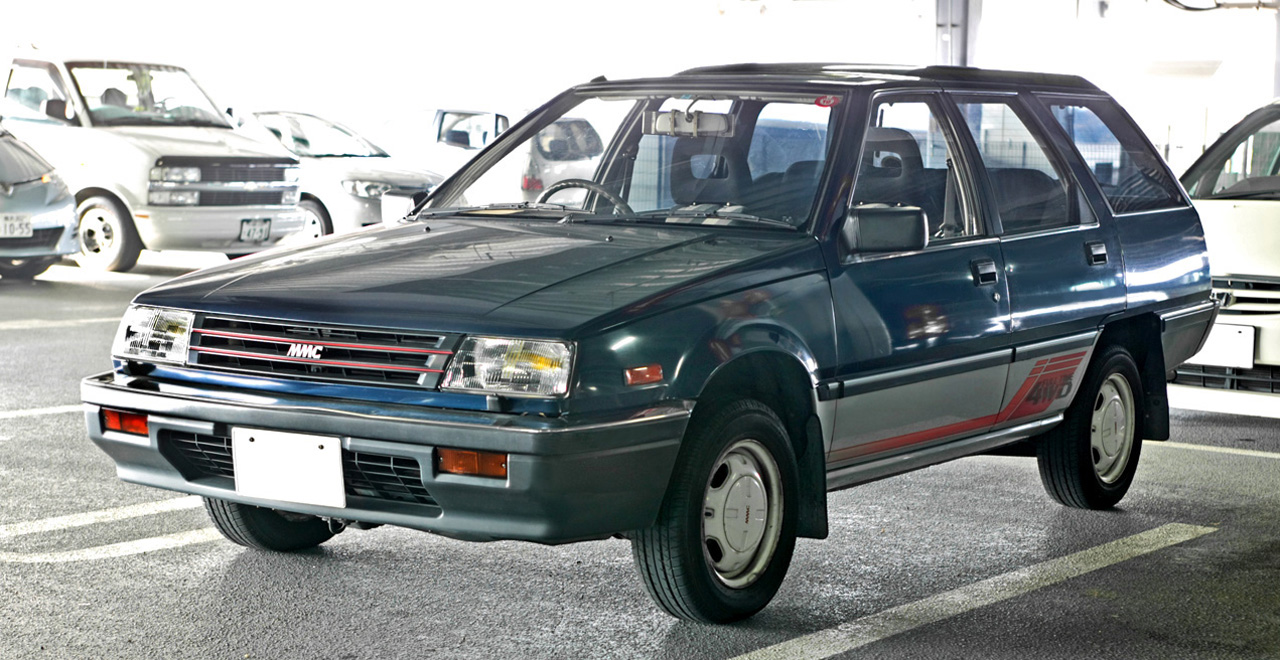
Mirage wagon (third facelift)

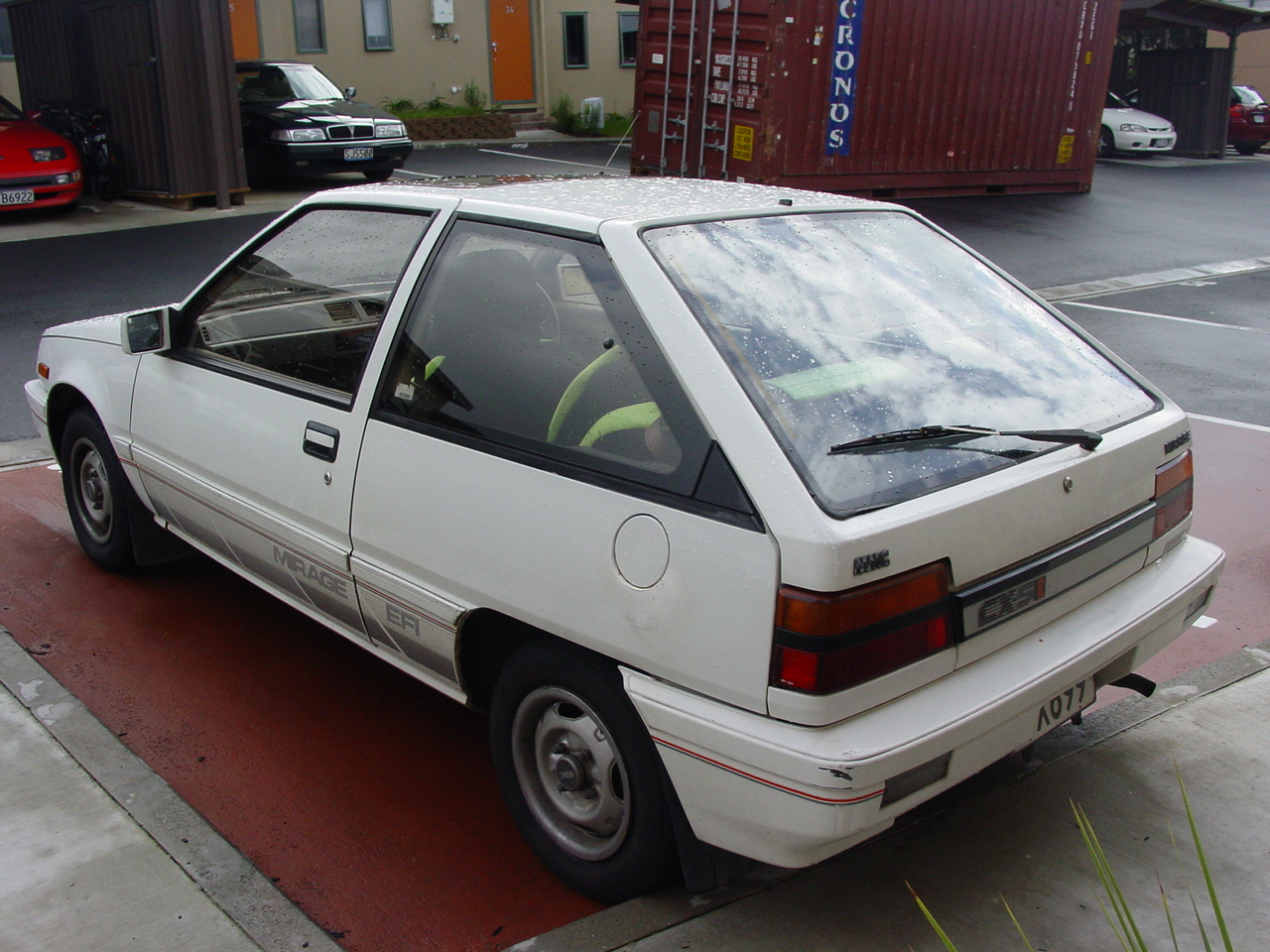
Mirage 3-door hatchback

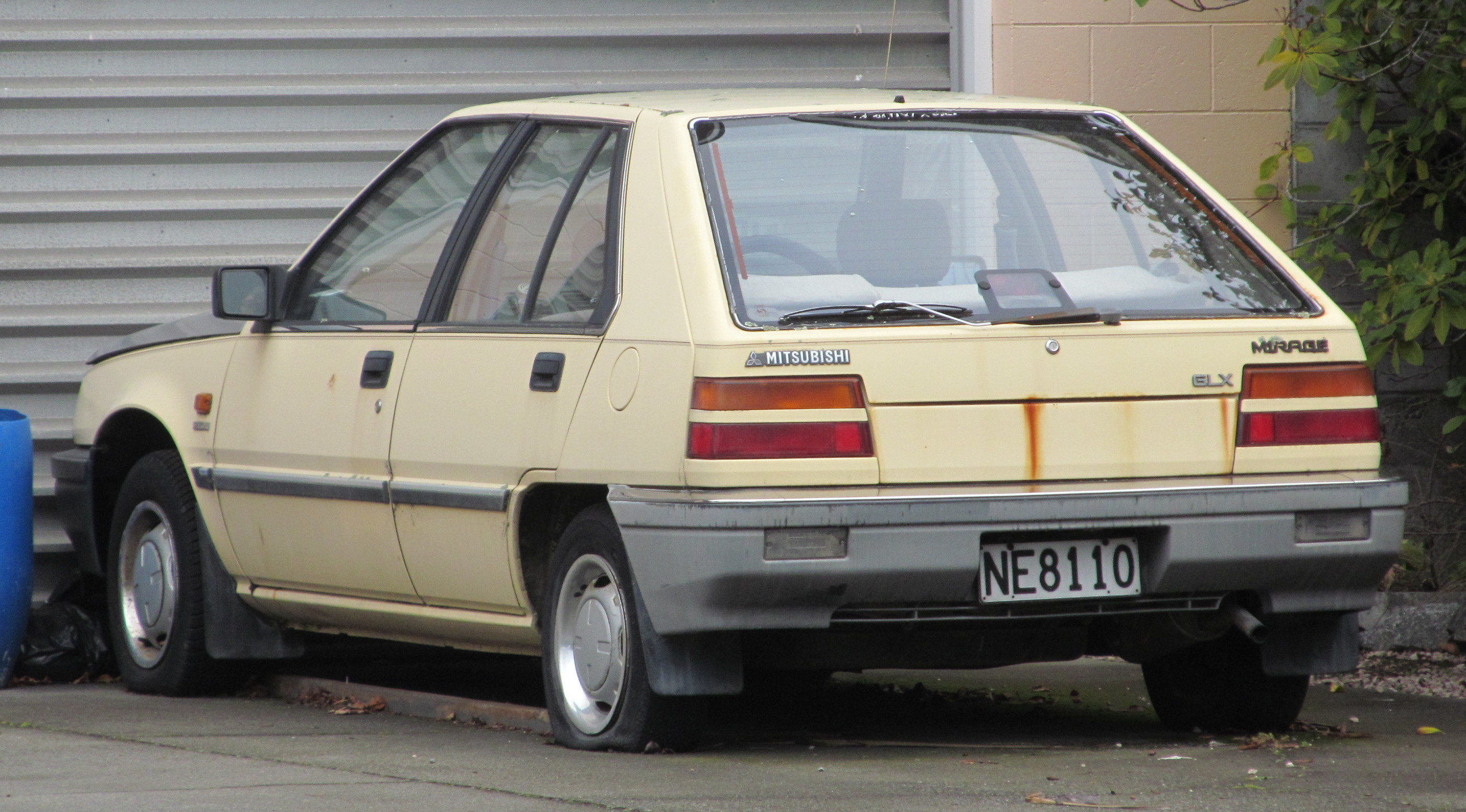
Mirage 5-door hatchback

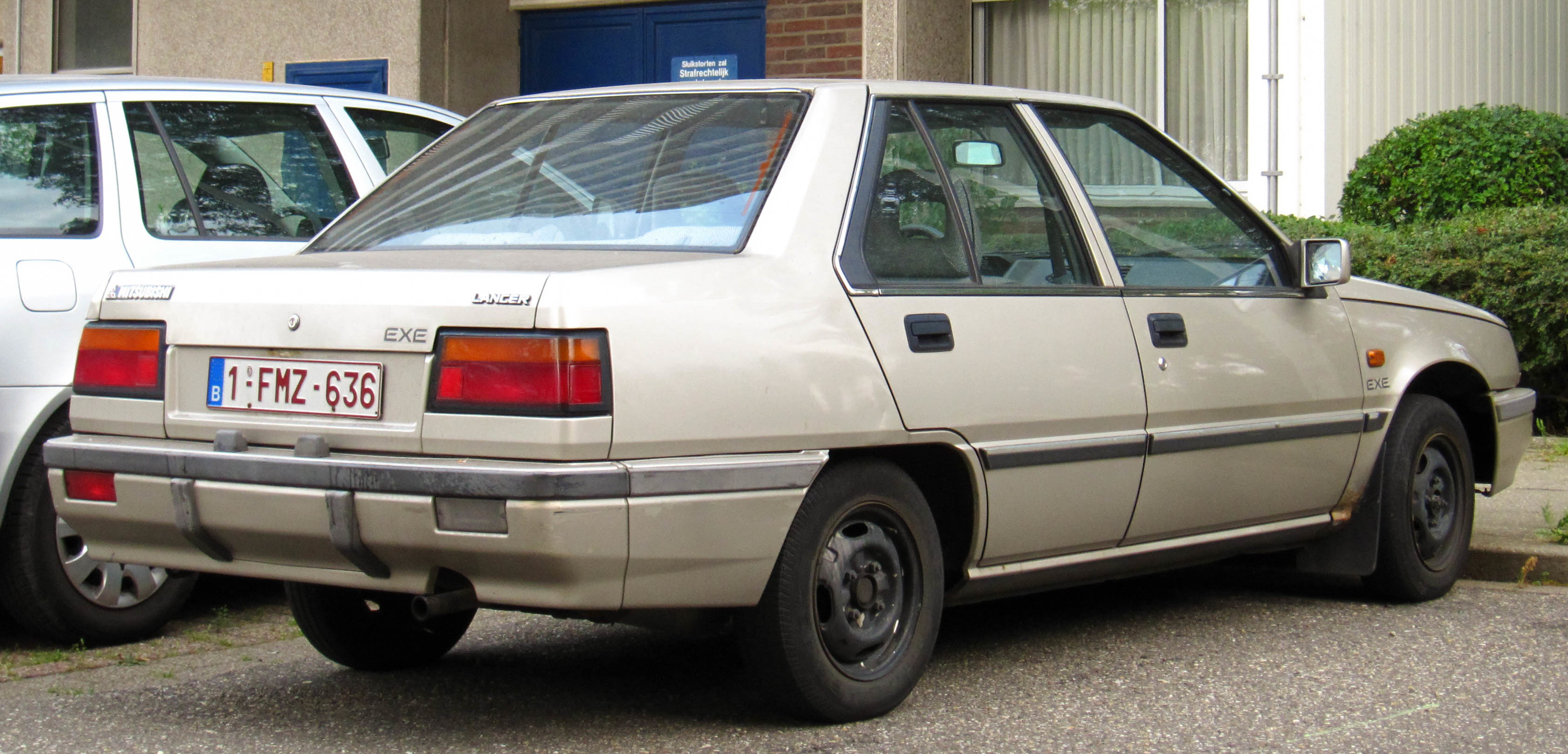
Lancer sedan (Europe)

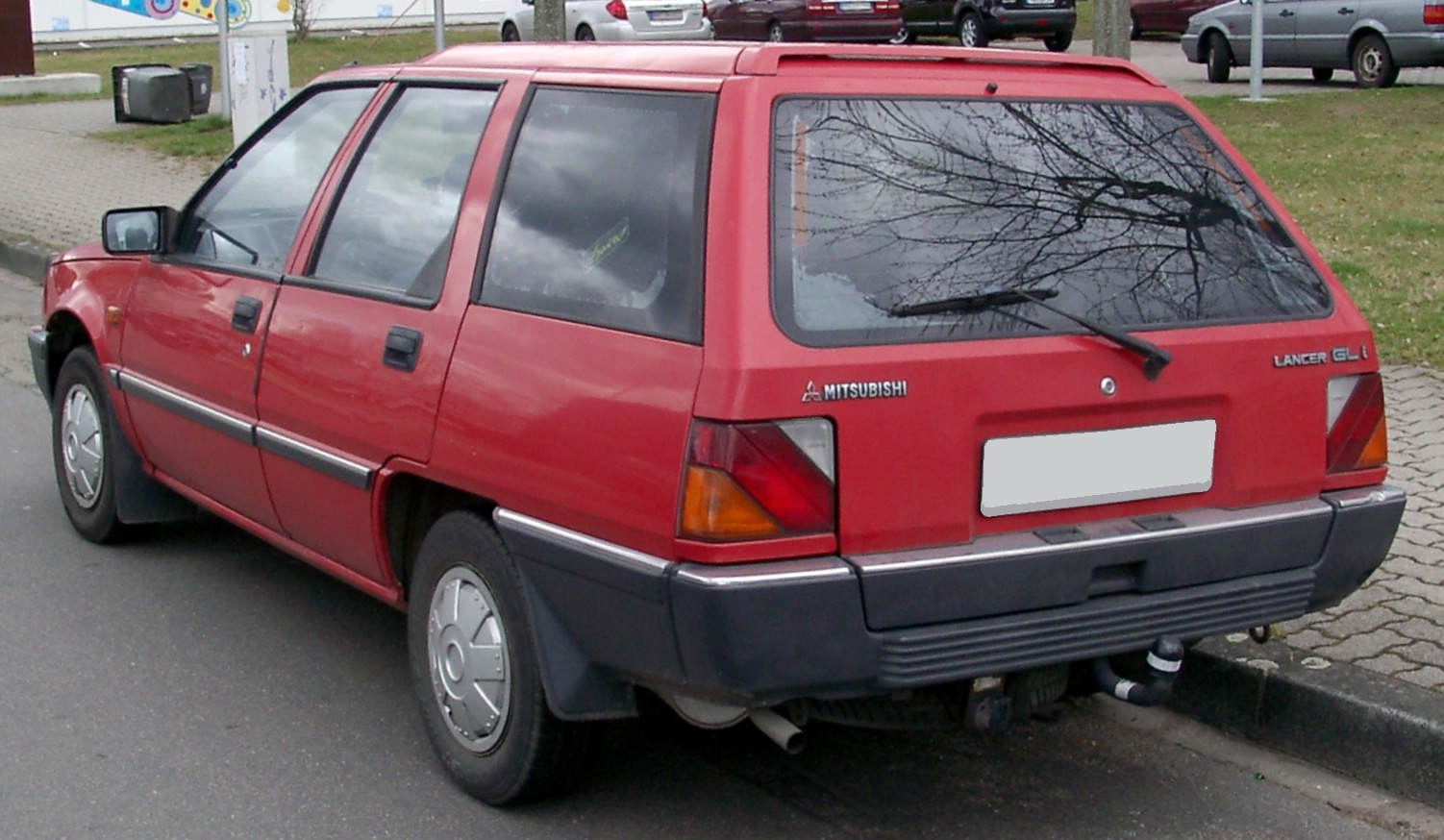
Lancer wagon

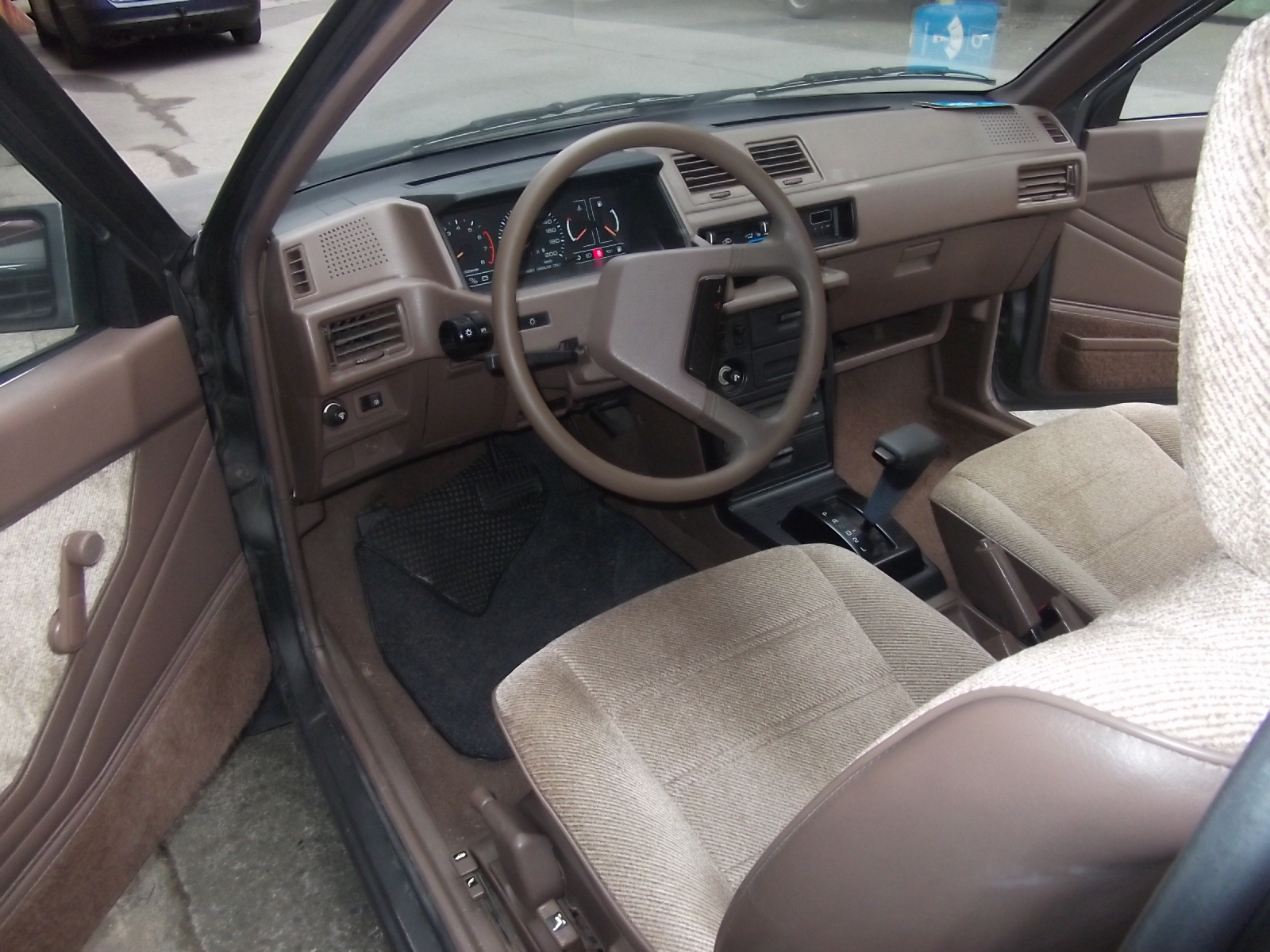
Interior

=== Export ===
Europe

The Mirage was available in Europe as the Colt in 1200 L, EL, and GL trims (mostly three-door models only, but a five-door GL was sold in some markets), as the 1300 GL three- and five-door, 1500 GLX three- and five-door, and as the 1800 L/EL/GL (diesel) three- or five-door. The Lancer sedan was available in the same trim levels as the hatchback model (including the 1200 engine), while the wagon versions were available as 1500 GLX and 1800 GL diesel only. The three-door Colt Turbo was also sold in Europe, with the 125 PS (92 kW) 1.6-liter ECI engine. The Colt Turbo fared badly in competition with its European GTi-class competitors, with period testers criticizing Mitsubishi for not doing much more than adding a turbocharger, spoilers, and fat tires. It was not a thorough engineering job and the car was not able to fully handle the ample power made available.

Some markets also received the 4WD Wagon with the larger 1.8-liter engine, although the diesel-powered 4WD remained available to Japanese customers only. Versions equipped with catalytic converters first became available in Europe in 1985, at the same time as the wagon was introduced. The two-seater commercial type was sold in the Netherlands simply as the "Mitsubishi Wagon", whereas the better equipped passenger version was called the Lancer Station Wagon.

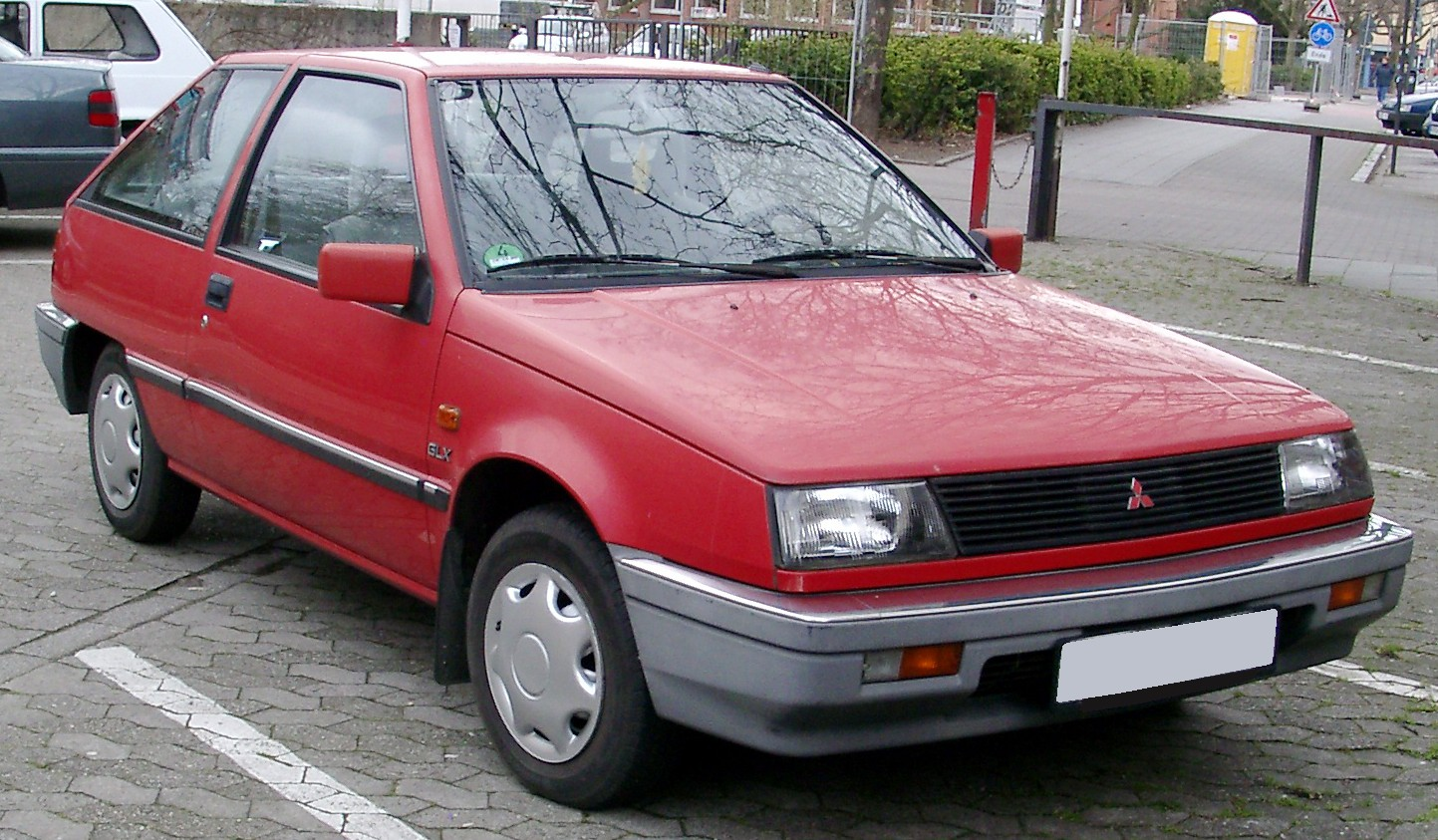
Mitsubishi Colt 3-door hatchback (facelift)

North America

The Mirage was not sold in the United States by Mitsubishi until the 1985 model year. As the usual export name Colt was already used by Dodge and Plymouth, while Lancer was in use by Dodge on an unrelated car, Mitsubishi stuck to Mirage for their own version of the car. Mitsubishi made a 25-year licensing deal to use the "Mirage" name with Grand Touring Cars, Inc. of Scottsdale, Arizona for use in the United States, as that company already owned the rights to the name for the Mirage race car series. While Dodge/Plymouth Colt-branded models were available with four-door sedan bodywork as well as a short-lived five-door hatchback - from model year 1988 also a station wagon - Mitsubishi originally marketed the Mirage only as a three-door hatch through its own American dealers, despite the five-door model having repeatedly been rejected by Chrysler's marketing organization in favor of the Dodge Omni.

The 1985 Mirage's equipment levels were Base, L, LS, and Turbo, with prices set a few hundred dollars beneath those of its Dodge/Plymouth equivalents. The well-equipped LS model was dropped after the first model year, and in 1987 a four-door sedan was added to the lineup. For 1988, only the Turbo Sport hatchback and naturally aspirated standard 4-door sedan remained in price listings, as the new Mitsubishi Precis supplanted the basic hatchback Mirage. As with the Colts sold by Chrysler, the turbo gained a few horsepower for a total of 105 hp (78 kW).

New Zealand

A commercial version of the wagon was sold in New Zealand as the Mitsubishi Express, replacing an earlier model based on the Galant Sigma. The second generation Mirage range was also assembled in New Zealand, but was never sold in Australia, where the original version was kept in production until the third generation replaced it in 1988.

Southeast Asia

Mitsubishi in Thailand released the three-door hatchback and four-door sedan models with 1.3- and 1.5-liter engine as the Mitsubishi Champ in 1983. Later the series was renamed Mitsubishi Champ II and Champ III, with the hatchback and 1.5-liter versions discontinued. This was also exported to Canada from January 1988 until the end of Champ production in 1994.

In Indonesia, both the sedan and the 5-door hatchback were sold under the Lancer FF nameplate. Available in two trim levels, SL with a 1.4-liter engine and GLX with a 1.6-liter engine.

The four-door sedan formed the basis of the Proton Saga, Malaysia's first locally built car and manufactured between 1985 and 2008. Proton would later spin the Saga off into its own five-door hatchback called the Saga Aeroback in 1987 (longer, and styled differently from Mitsubishi's own five-door hatchback version).

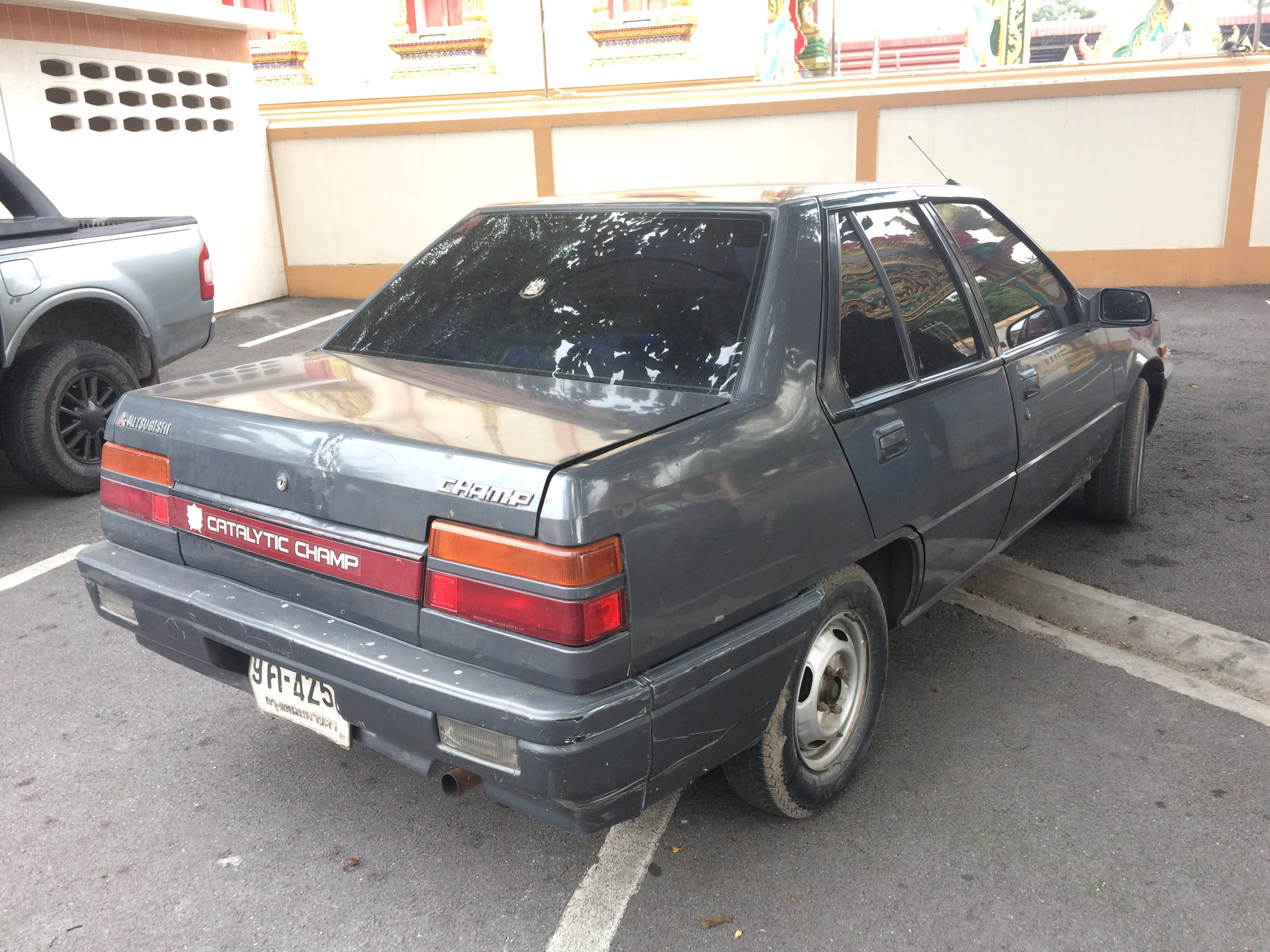
Mitsubishi Champ sedan (second facelift)

== Third generation (1987; C50/60/70/80) ==
Third generation
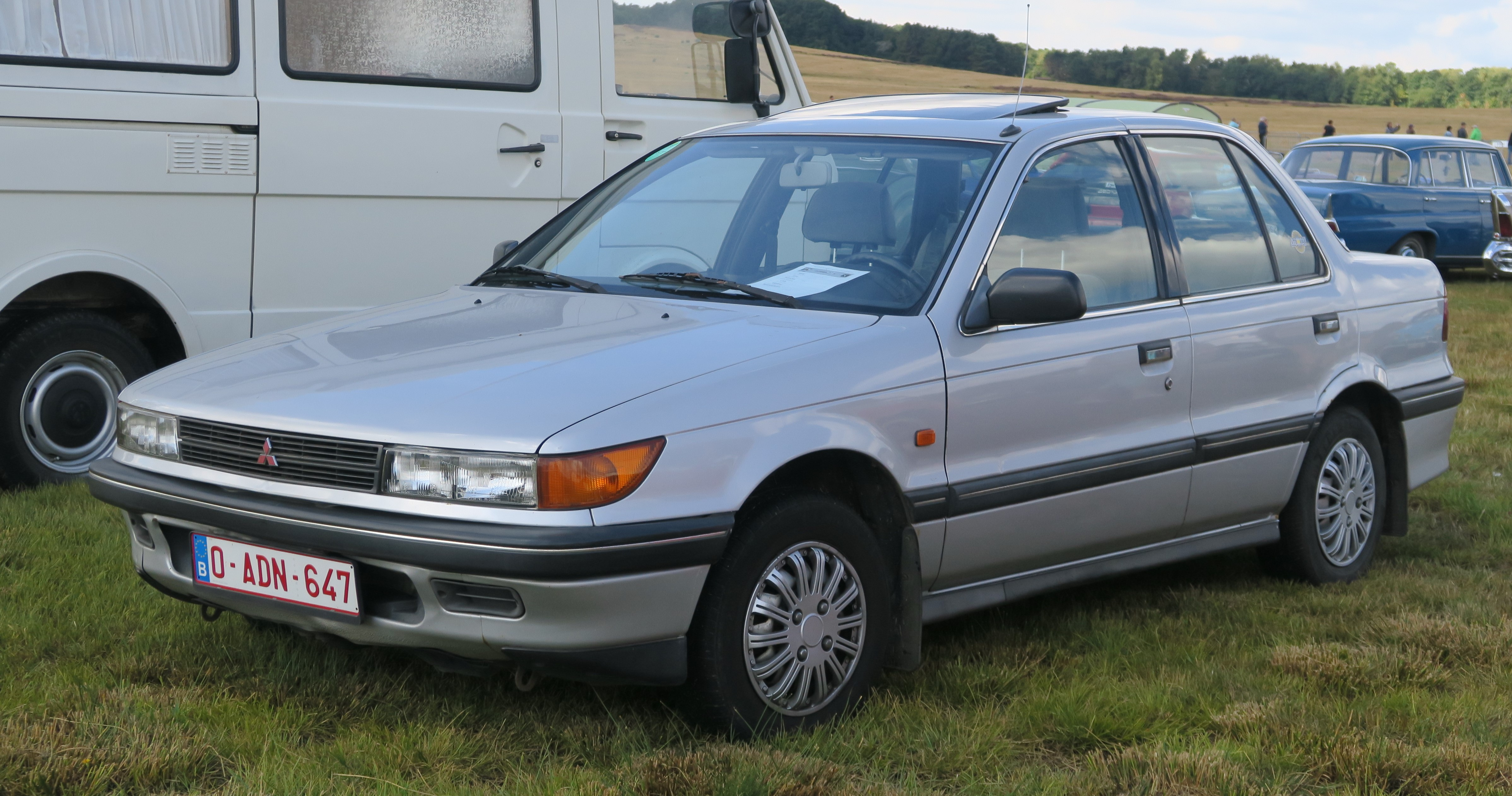
- Mitsubishi Lancer sedan (Europe, pre-facelift)

Overview
- Model code: C50/80 (hatchback); C60/70 (sedan/liftback)
- Also called: Mitsubishi Colt; Mitsubishi Lancer; Eagle Summit; Dodge/Plymouth Colt
- Production: September 1987–May 1992 (hatchback); December 1987–May 1992 (sedan); May 1988–July 1995 (liftback)
- Assembly: Japan: Okazaki, Aichi (Nagoya Plant); New Zealand: Porirua, Wellington (Todd Motors); Indonesia: Pademangan, North Jakarta (PT. Krama Yudha Kesuma Motor); Philippines: Cainta (Philippine Automotive Manufacturing Corporation); Thailand: Laem Chabang (MMTh); United States: Normal, IL (DSM)

Body and chassis
- Body style: 3-door hatchback/panel van; 4-door sedan; 5-door liftback
- Layout: Front-engine, front-wheel-drive; Front-engine, four-wheel-drive
- Related: Hyundai Elantra (J1)

Powertrain
- Engine: Gasoline: 1,198 cc 4G16 SOHC 8V I4; 1,298 cc 4G13 SOHC 8V/12V I4; 1,468 cc 4G15 SOHC 8V/12V I4; 1,595 cc 4G61 DOHC 16V I4; 1,595 cc 4G61T DOHC 16V turbo I4; 1,597 cc 4G92 SOHC 16V I4; 1,755 cc 4G37 SOHC 8V I4; 1,836 cc 4G67 DOHC 16V I4; 1,834 cc 4G93 DOHC 16V I4; Diesel: 1,795 cc 4D65 8V I4; 1,795 cc 4D65T 8V turbo diesel I4; 1,998 cc 4D68 8V I4
- Transmission: 4/5-speed manual 3/4-speed automatic

Dimensions
- Wheelbase: Hatchback: 2,385 mm (93.9 in); Sedan/liftback: 2,455 mm (96.7 in)
- Length: Hatchback: 3,950 mm (155.5 in); 4,030 mm (158.7 in) (long bumpers); Sedan/liftback: 4,235 mm (166.7 in); 4,320 mm (170.1 in) (long bumpers)
- Width: 1,670 mm (65.7 in)
- Height: Hatchback: 1,320–1,400 mm (52.0–55.1 in); 1,340–1,425 mm (52.8–56.1 in) (sedan/liftback)
- Curb weight: Hatchback: 870–1,130 kg (1,918–2,491 lb); Sedan: 880–1,150 kg (1,940–2,535 lb); Liftback: 920–1,190 kg (2,028–2,624 lb)

Mitsubishi introduced the more rounded, third-generation Mirage to Japan in October 1987. Masaru Furukawa headed the vehicle design, with Yasukichi Akamatsu given the role of chief engineer. The basic model, a three-door hatchback with upright tailgate and large glasshouse arrived first. The sedan, released to Japan in January 1988 was stylistically distinct with almost vertical rear glass, influenced by the larger Galant. The range was complemented by a five-door liftback in June 1988, but without a station wagon variant, Mitsubishi persevered with the previous model until the release of a new wagon on the fourth generation chassis. As before, Mirage, Colt, and Lancer naming varied between markets with different body shapes often having different titles in the same market. In Japan, sedan and hatchback were available with the Mirage nameplate, while the liftback was sold only as Lancer. Japanese Mirage sedans usually featured the "Vie Saloon" suffix.

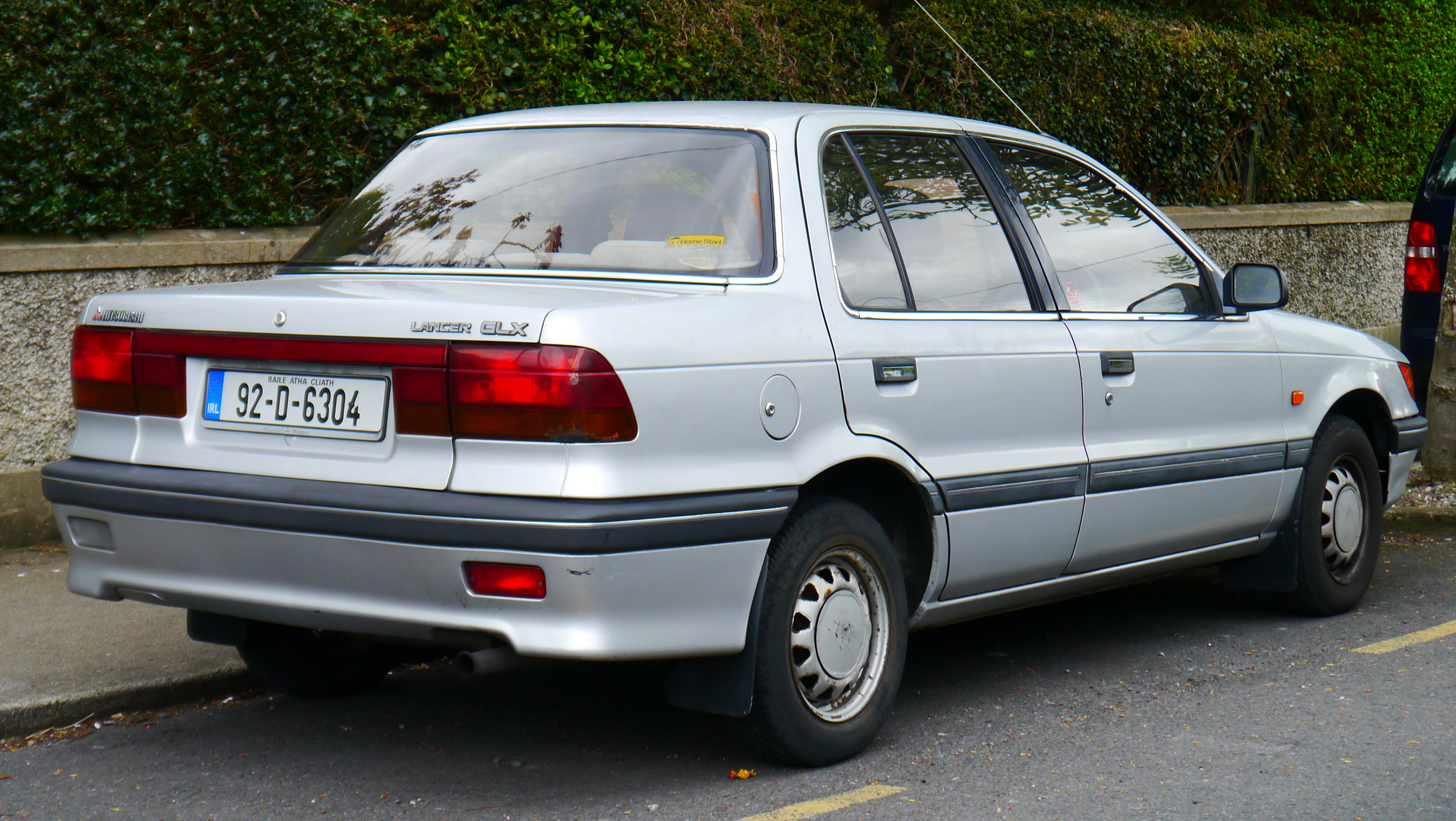
Lancer Sedan (Europe; pre-facelift)

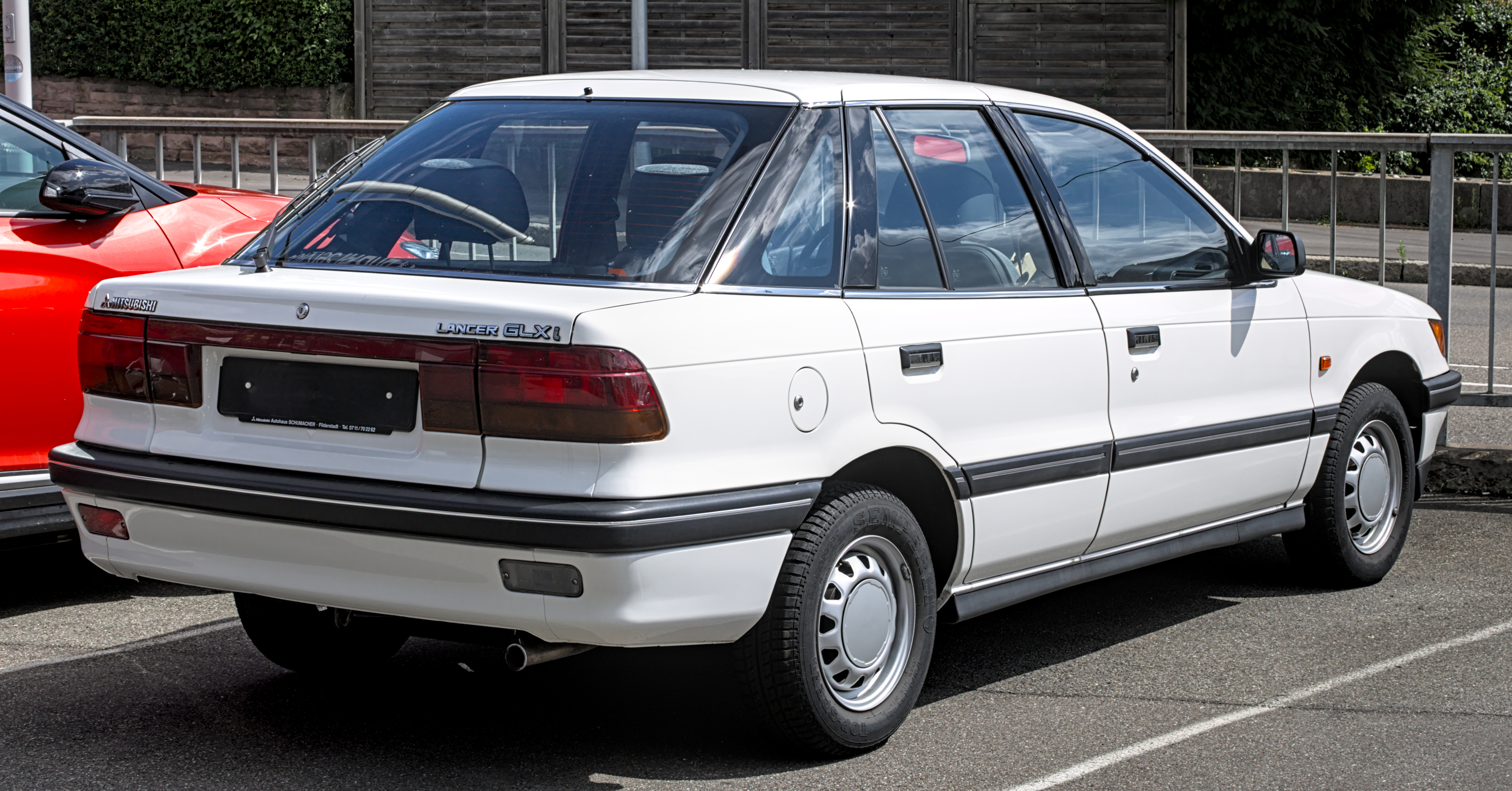
Lancer 5-door liftback (Europe; pre-facelift)

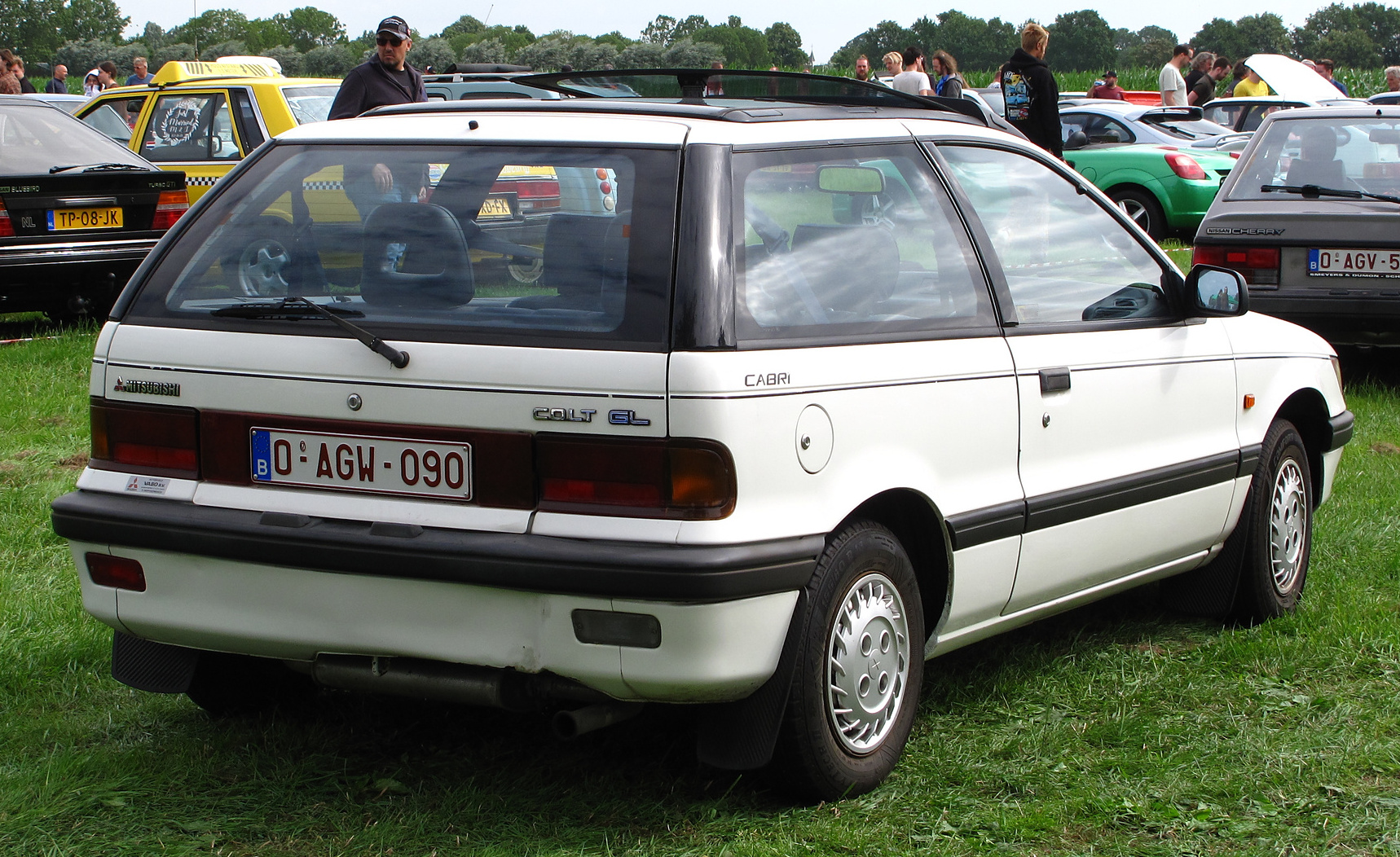
Colt 3-door hatchback (Europe; pre-facelift)

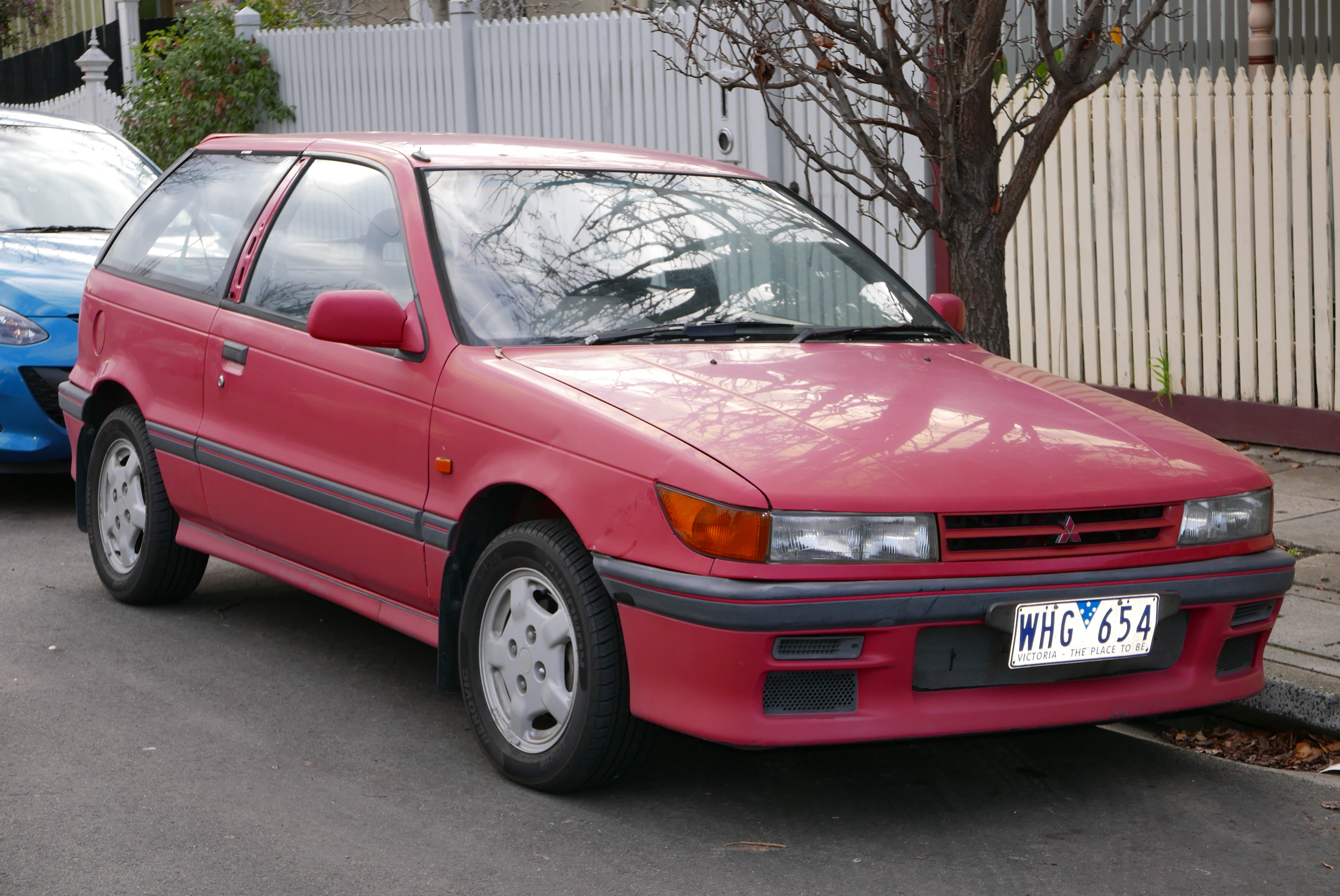
Pre-facelift Lancer GSR 3-door (Australia)

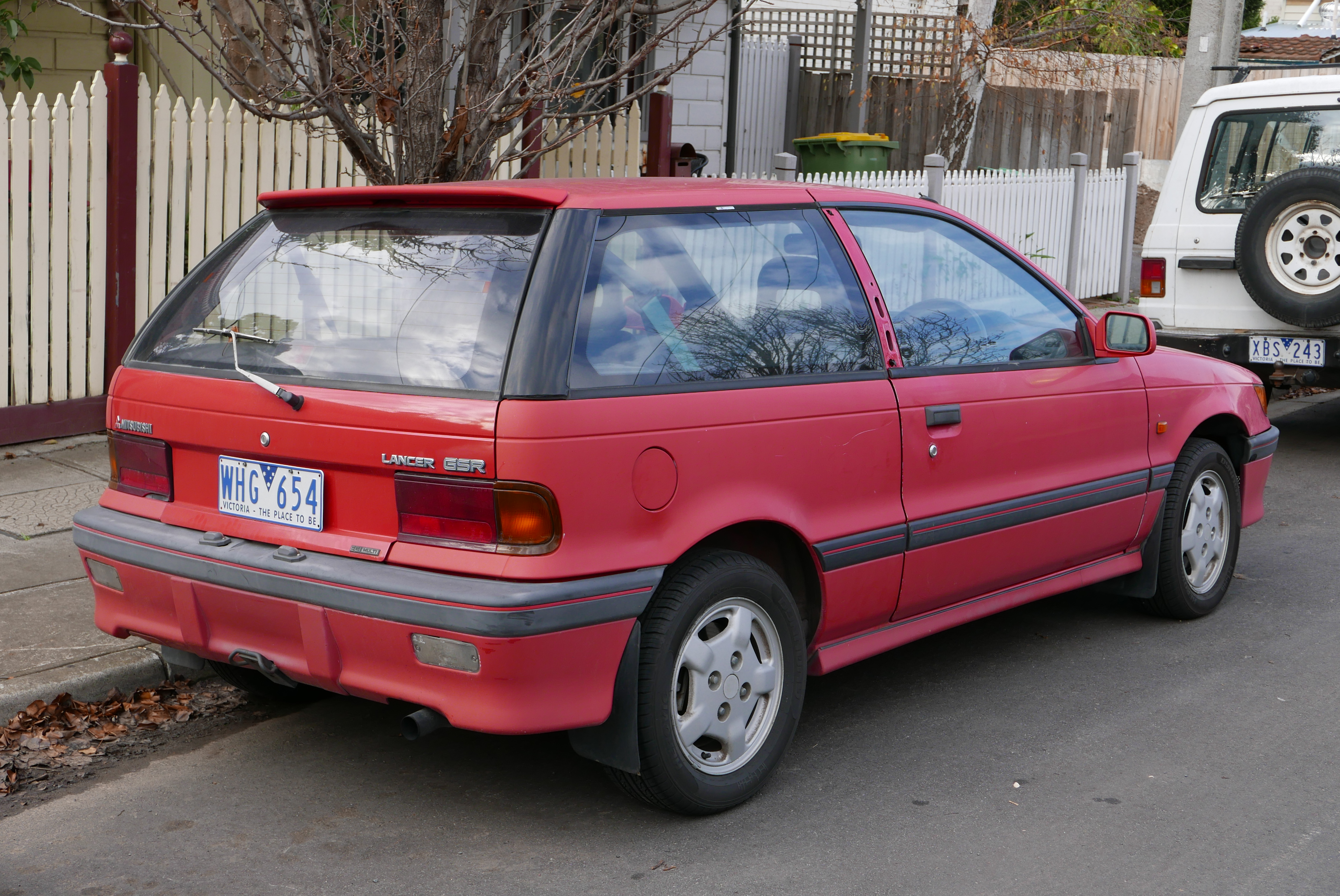
Pre-facelift Lancer GSR 3-door (Australia)

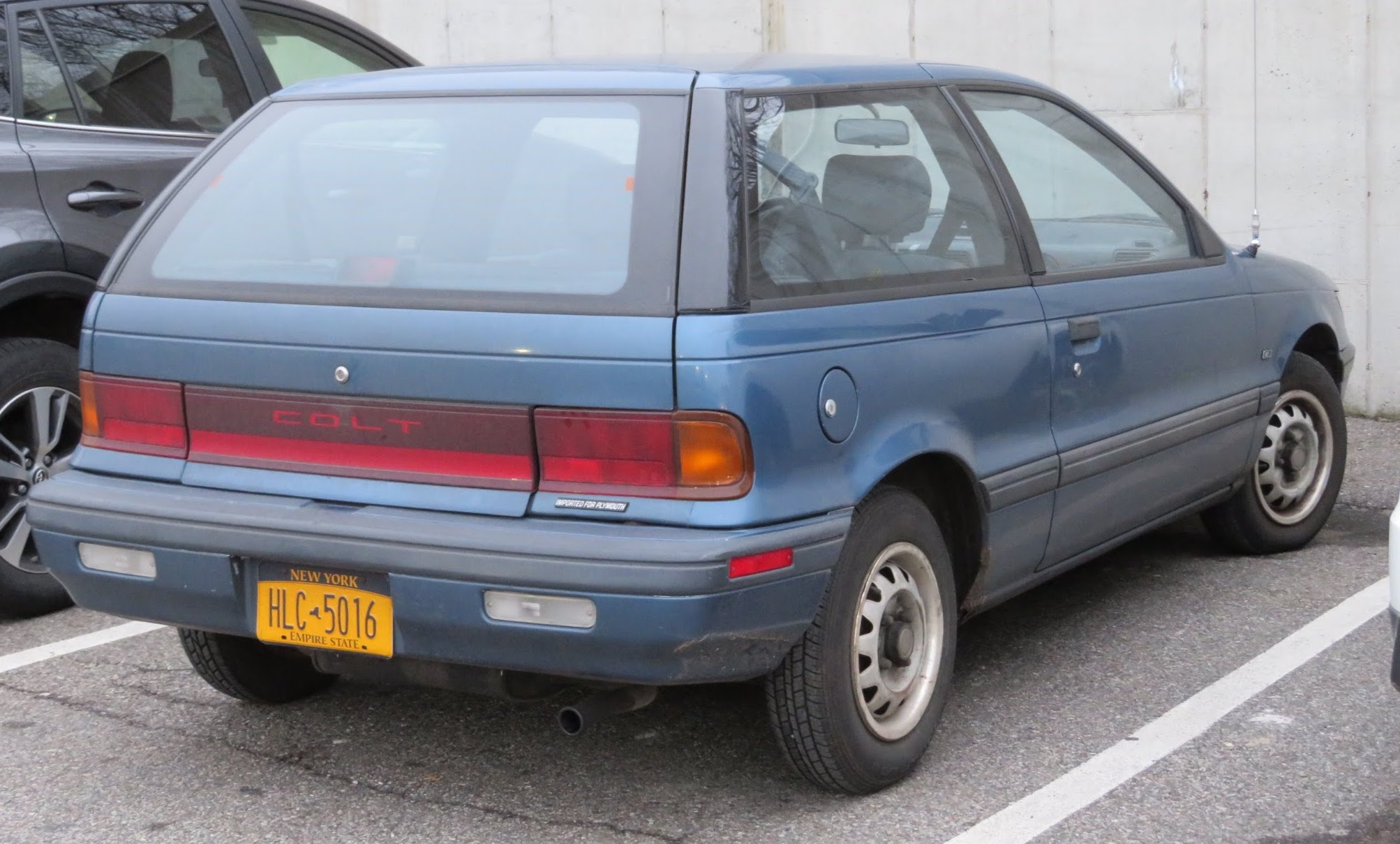
Plymouth Colt (USA), similar to American Mirage/Middle Eastern Colt hatchbacks

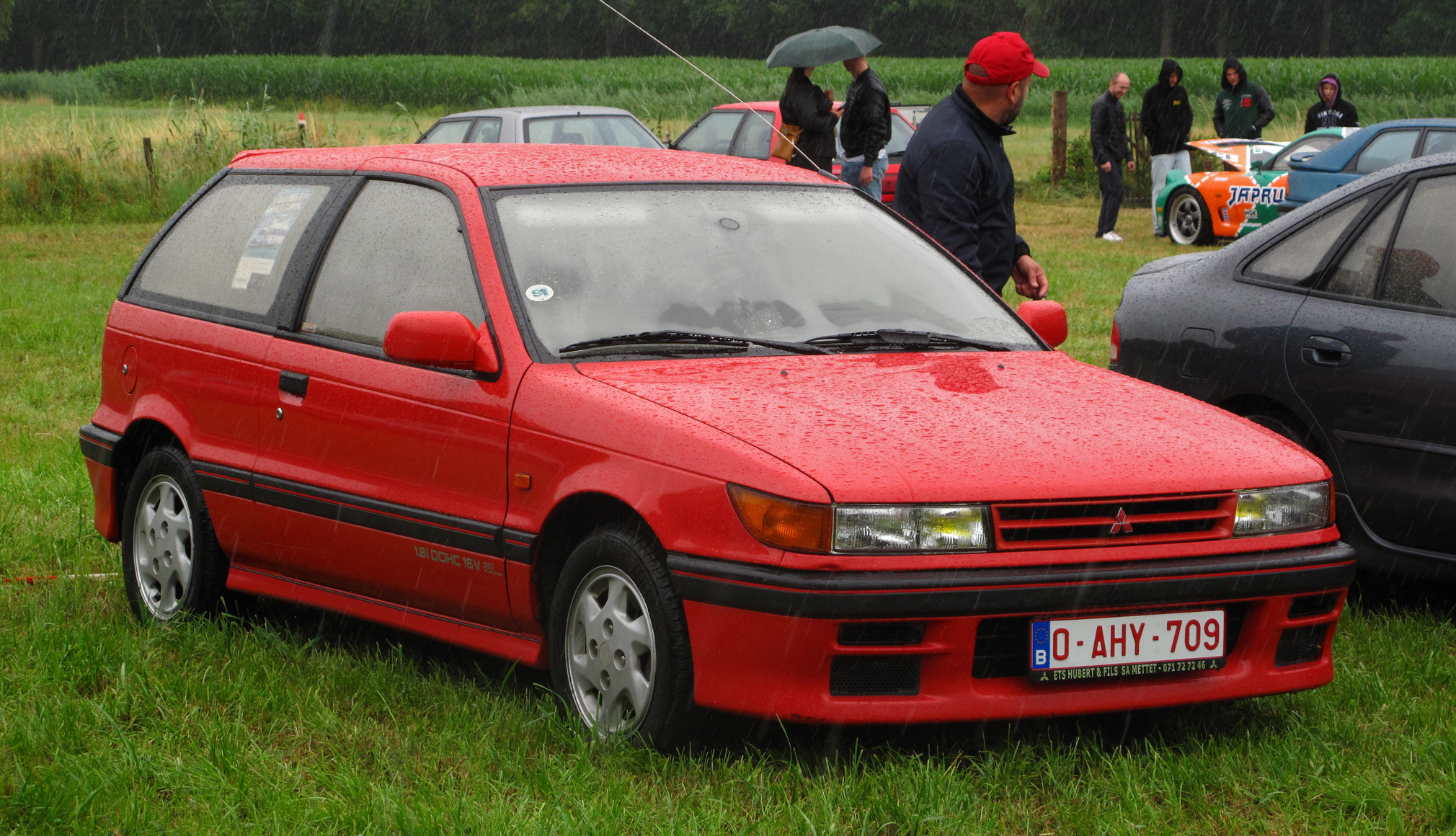
Colt GTi hatchback (Europe, pre-facelift)

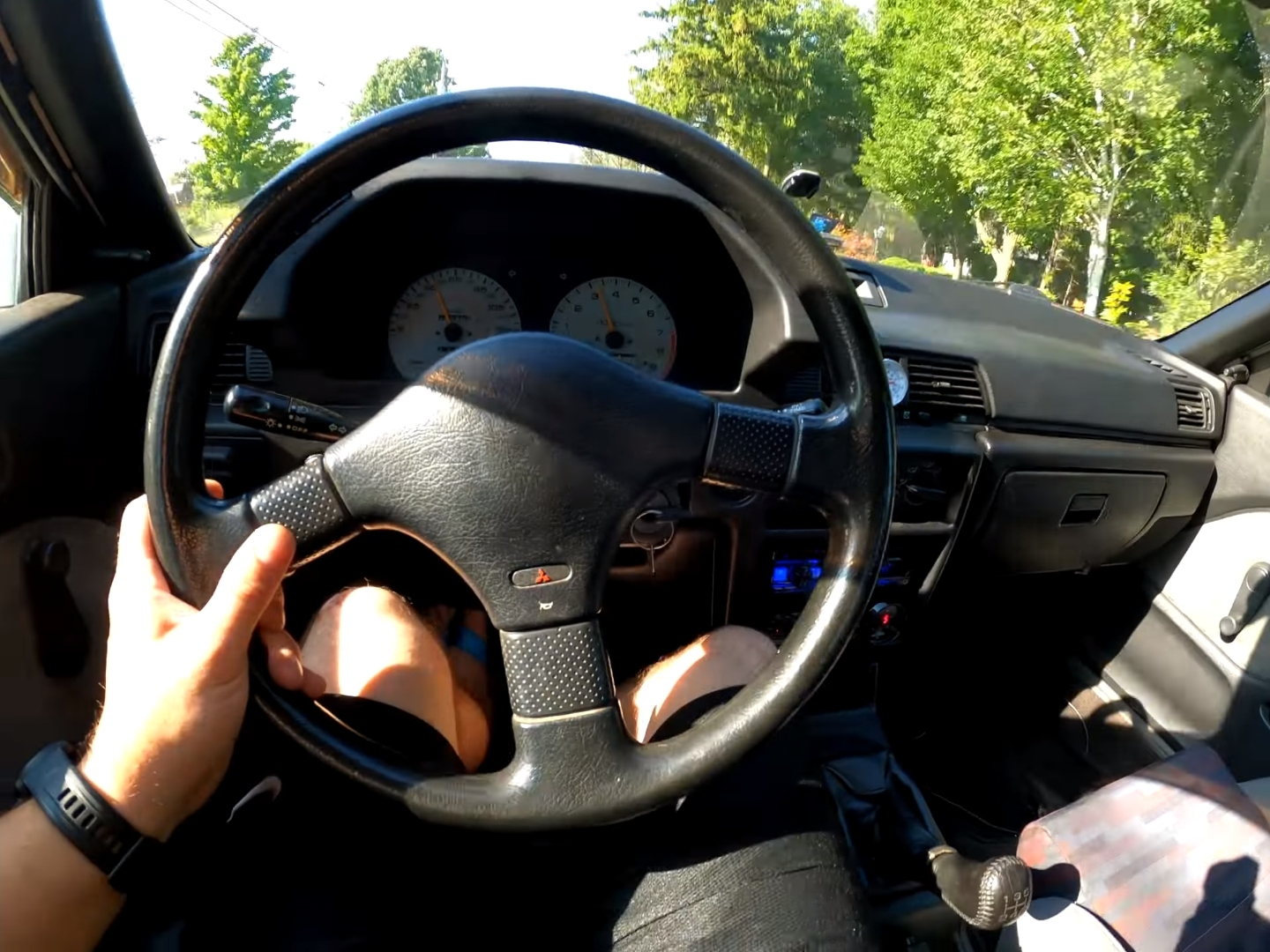
Interior (top models only)

Engines available were 1.3- and 1.5-liter Orion gasoline inline-fours and 1.8-liter Saturn gasoline inline-four. For Greece only, a 1.2-liter version of Orion engine available in the entry-level models outputted 48 kW (65 PS). The 1.8-liter Sirius diesel carried over from the previous shape. In Japan, four-wheel-drive versions were also available, fitted with the carbureted 1.5 and fuel-injected 1.6-liter gasoline engines, or 1.8-liter diesel. The top Mirages in Japan were called the "Cyborg", featuring the turbocharged 1.6-liter engine developing 145 PS (107 kW) — the same unit as fitted to the Lancer GSR liftback.

=== Facelifts ===
The third generation received a minor facelift in September 1989, with late models receiving the same modernized engines as were seen in the subsequent generation. In its most potent turbocharged variant, the new 4G61 engine produced 160 PS (118 kW) at 6000 rpm. The second facelift, which occurred in October 1990, featured new sets of taillights with clear turn signals. The final facelift was released in 1992, exclusively for the liftback, with a front end that resembles the next generation sedan.

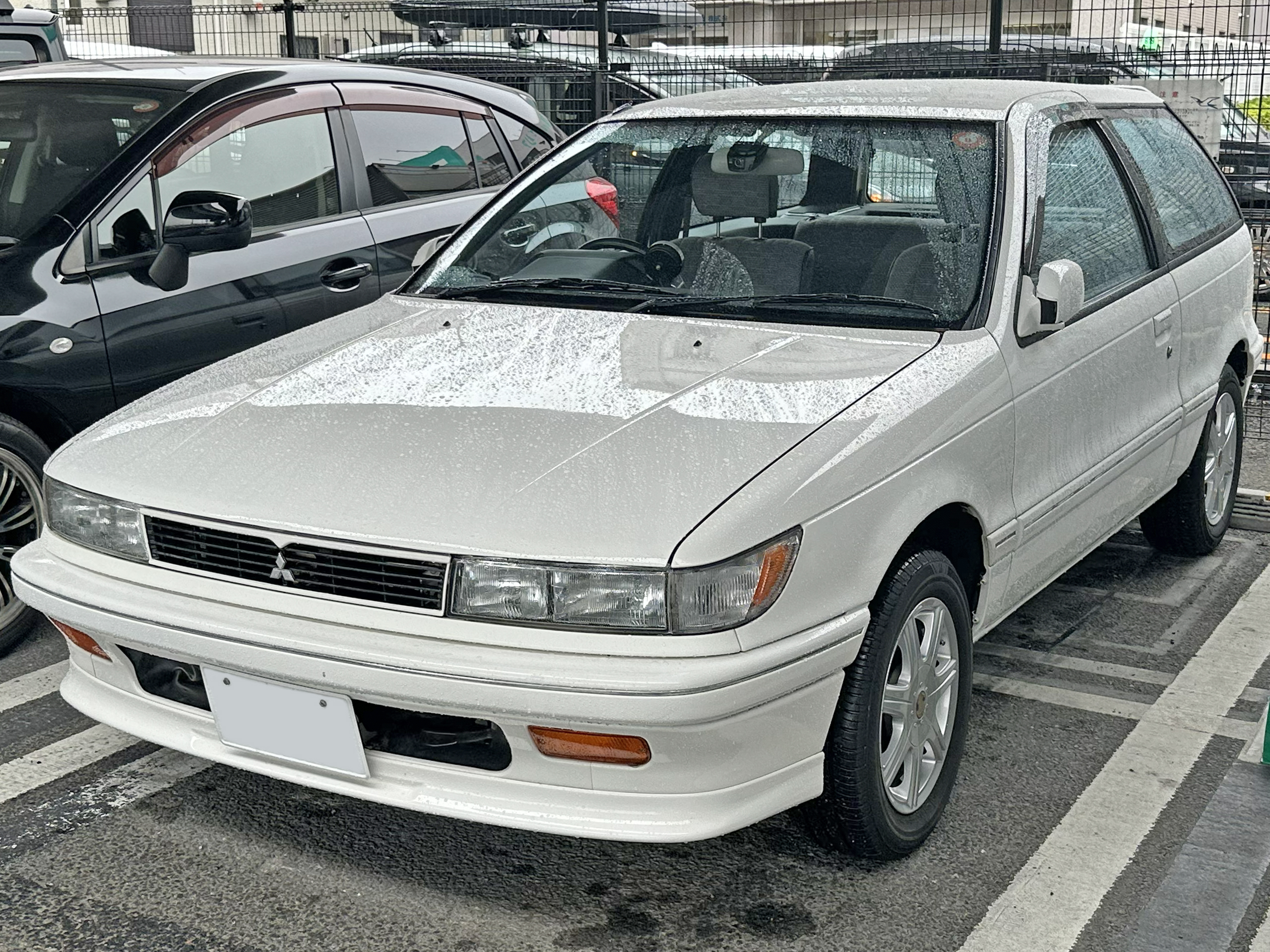
Mirage hatchback (Japan, facelift)

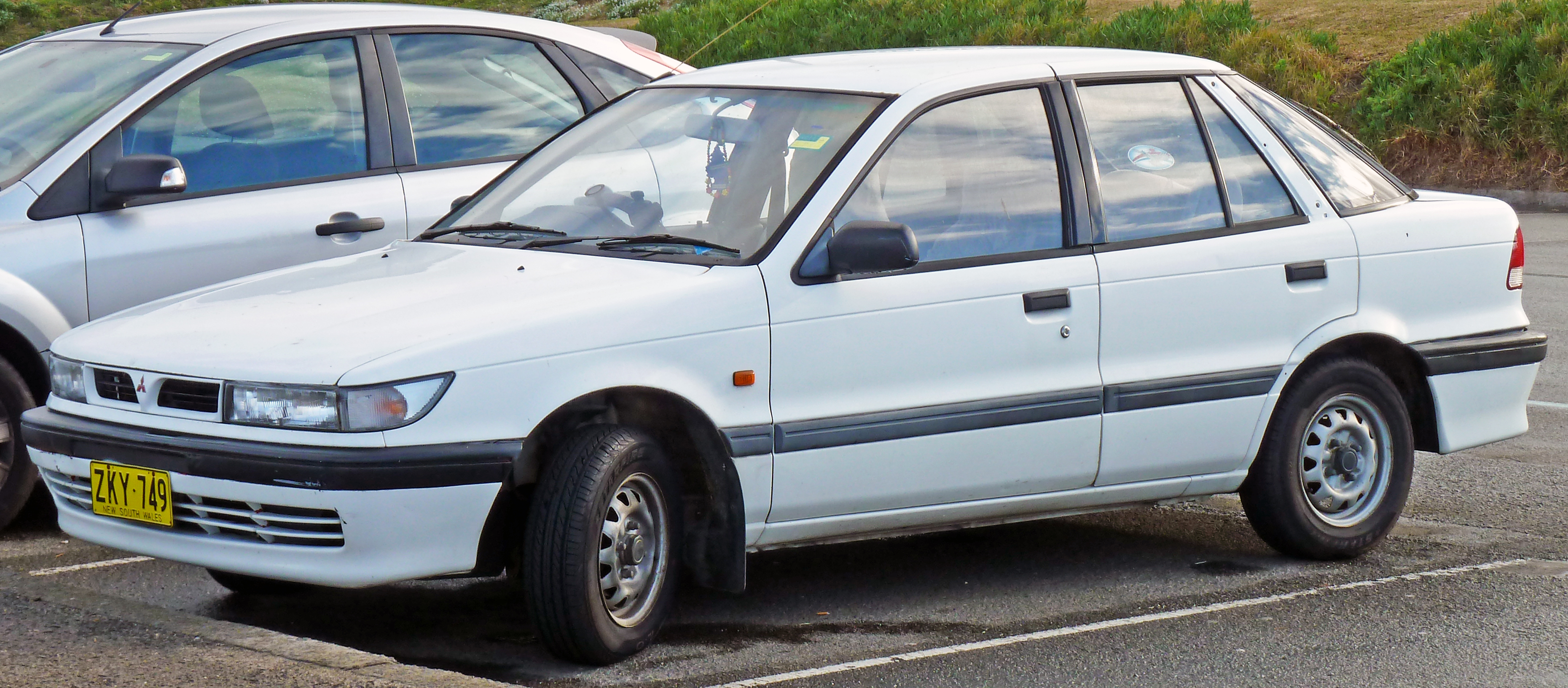
5-door liftback (Australia; facelift)

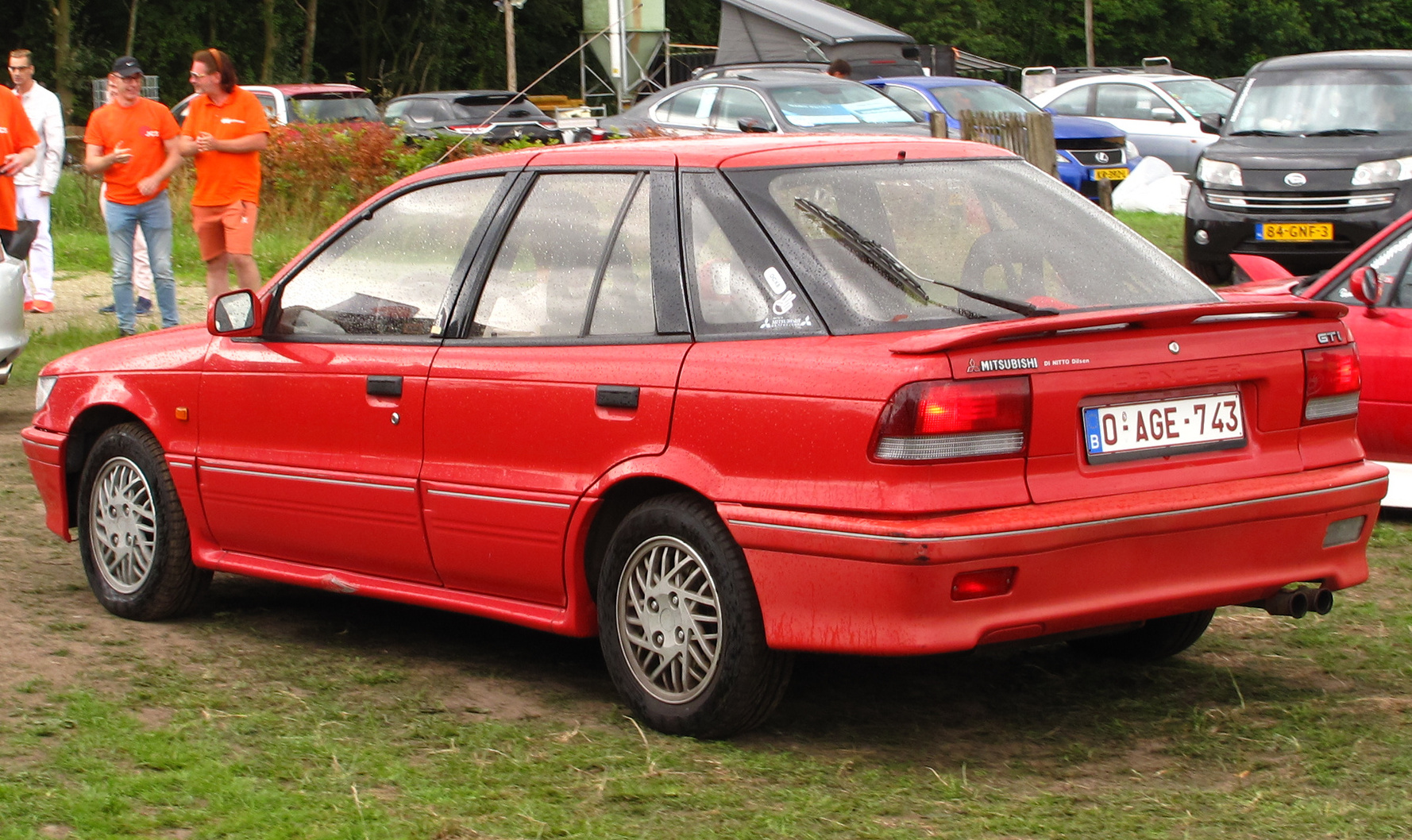
5-door (4G93) 1.8 GTi-16V liftback (Europe; facelift)

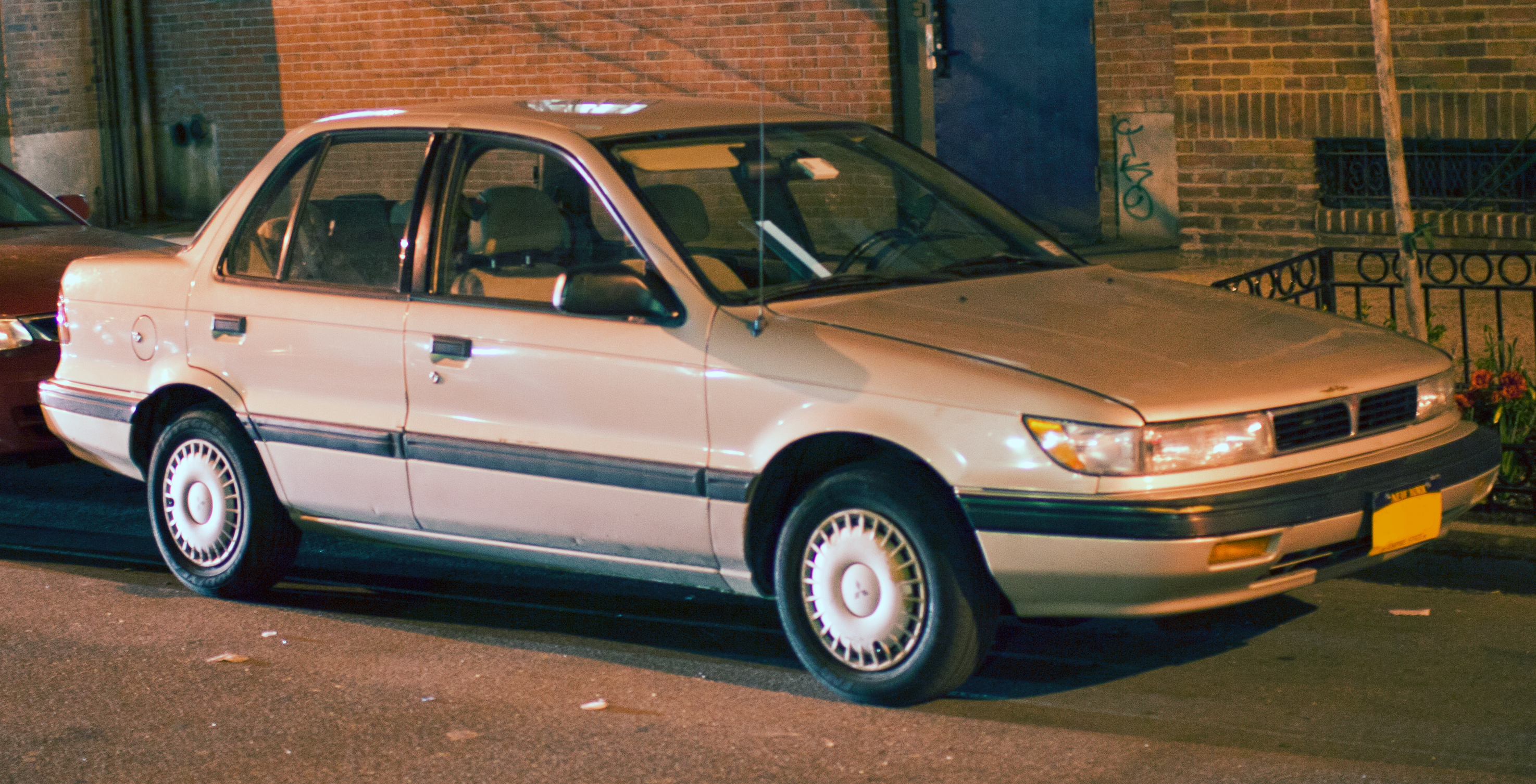
Mirage sedan (USA, facelift)

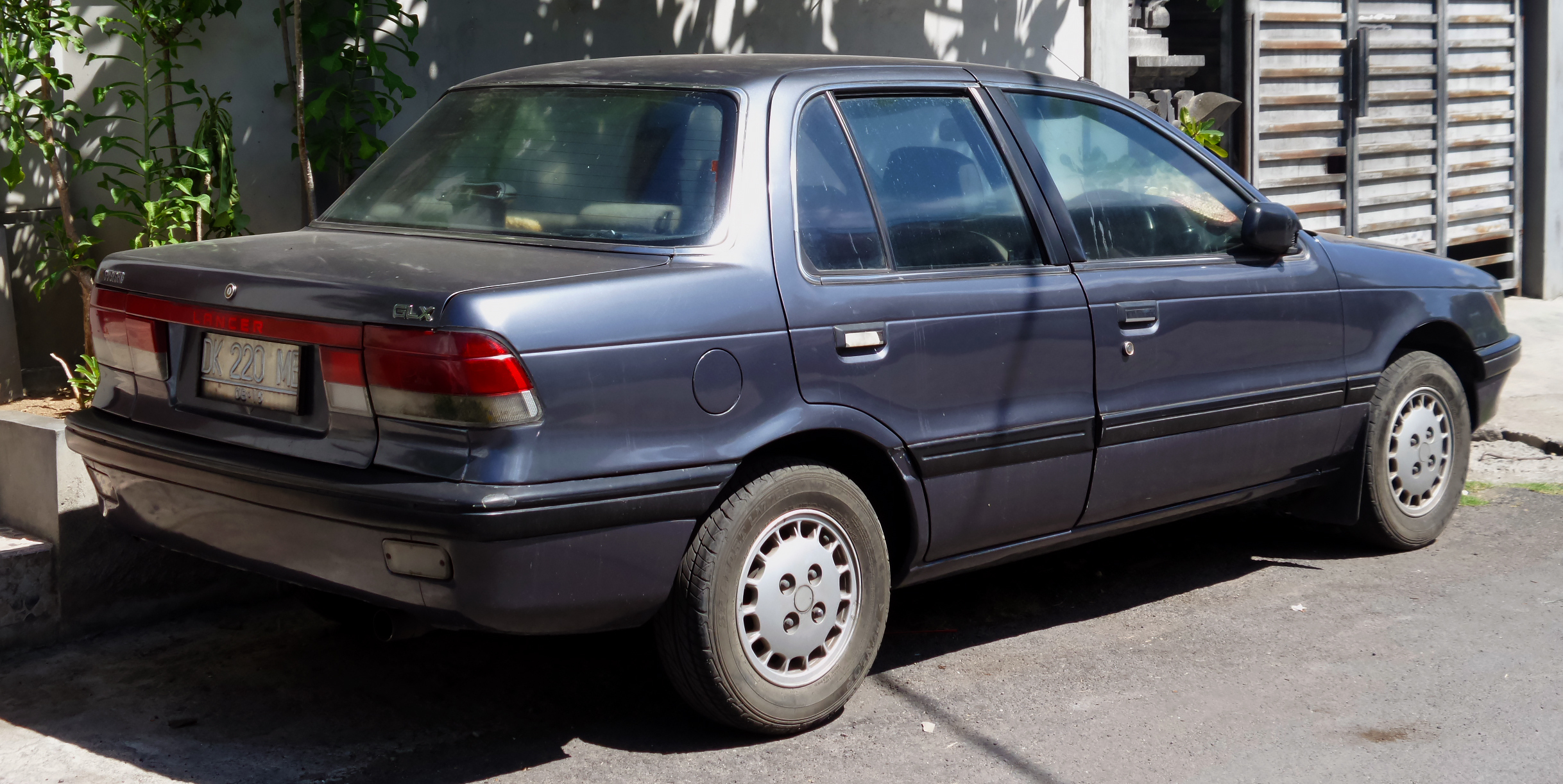
Sedan (Indonesia; facelift)

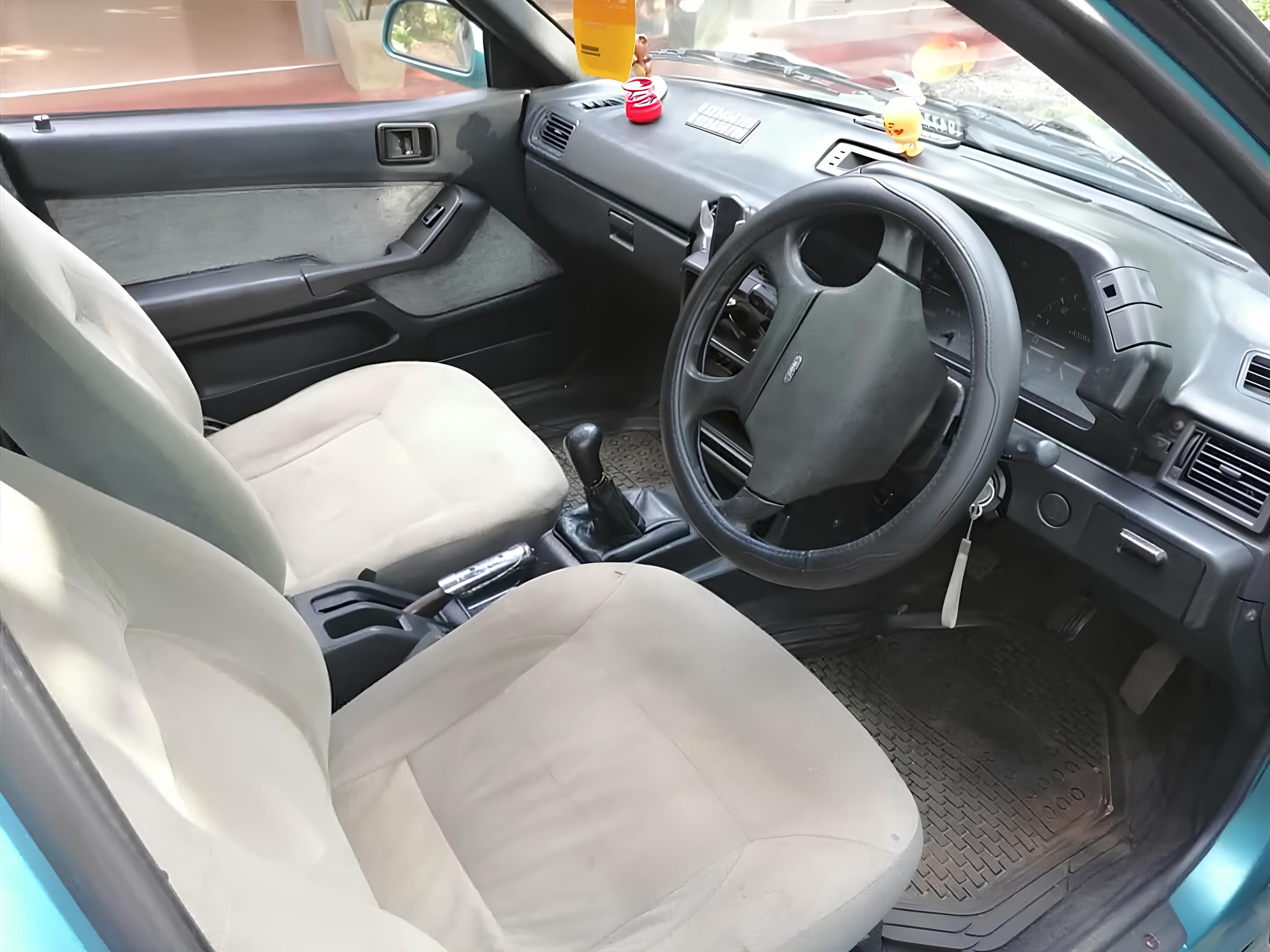
Interior (facelift, sedan/liftback only)

=== Markets ===
European versions were available as the 1300 EL/GL, 1500 GL/GLi/GLX/GLXi, 1600 and 1800 GTi-16V, 1800 GLXi 4x4, and 1800 GL/GLX diesels. The three-door hatchback was labelled Colt while the sedan and liftback were called Lancer. Mitsubishi retailed a Colt "van" in select European markets, being the three-door body without rear side windows and therefore attracting reduced taxation in these jurisdictions. German buyers were also offered a lower-powered version of the catalyzed 1.3-liter engine, producing 60 PS (44 kW) at 5,500 rpm, to qualify for lower insurance premiums. In March 1990, the 124 PS (91 kW), catalyzed 1600 GTi-16V was replaced by a 1.8-liter version with 136 PS (100 kW). A few months later, this version also became available with a non-catalyzed engine for those European markets that still eschewed emissions controls. The 8-valve, 1.3-litre engine was replaced by a somewhat more powerful, 12-valve version in June 1990; it was still carbureted, however. The next generation Lancer did not include a five-door hatchback; since this was a popular body style in Europe Mitsubishi kept offering this model until mid-1994. Beginning in June 1992, the higher line models were fitted with the new 1.6 and 1.8-litre engines from the 4G9 engine family; a fuel injected 75 PS (55 kW) version of the 12-valve 1.3-liter replaced the carbureted model used hitherto. The diesel engine was also replaced by a bigger 2.0-liter unit; although rare, it was only available in selected countries in mainland Europe.

Since first generation Mirages were still under Australian production as the Colt, all three third generation body types were imported from Japan and sold under the Lancer name in that market. Initially, the Australian-specification models were designated as the CA series when introduced in 1988, adopting the CB designation for the 1990 facelift. The liftback continued to be sold in Australia alongside the fourth generation CC Mirage-derived Lancer from 1992 through to 1996. Confusingly, the carry-over liftback was also given this CC model designation.

North American three-door and sedan sales occurred under the Mitsubishi Mirage name for the 1989 to 1992 model years. Badge engineered variants were also sold in the US as the Dodge/Plymouth Colt (three-door only), and Eagle Summit. In Canada, a Dodge/Plymouth sedan was also offered as the Mitsubishi brand did not operate in the market until the 2003 model year. For the Mitsubishi-badged versions, the top hatchback carried a 1.6-liter 4G61T turbocharged inline-four engine rated at 135 hp (101 kW). This was also available with Dodge Colt badging; the Colt also received power windows. Only about 900 Mirage Turbos were sold for the one model year they were available, and even fewer Dodge Colt Turbos. For the 1991 model year, the 1.5-liter 4G15 engine's new twelve valve heads (three valves per cylinder) boosted power from 81 to 92 hp (60 to 69 kW), and a new GS sedan offered the 1.6-liter 4G61 with 123 hp (92 kW) and a standard four-speed automatic transmission.

For the rest of the world, this generation was commonly sold as a Lancer sedan, although the Colt hatchback and Lancer liftback were also available in selected regions. The specifications for this market were almost similar to those of the European market, although it lacked an all-wheel-drive option and most regions did not receive fuel-injected engines below the high performance DOHC 16V-GTi models. For the Middle Eastern market hatchback and sedan models, the car featured the long bumpers from the US market Mirage. The Mirage sedan with long bumpers was also sold in Taiwan, imported from the US by the local Mitsubishi distributor. This was due to an import ban on fully built vehicles from Japan to Taiwan at the time, to avoid a higher trade deficit with Japan.

Specifications

| Model code | Displacement | Engine | | Power | Torque | Drivetrain | Transmission* | | Body style | Markets | Production |
|---|---|---|---|---|---|---|---|---|---|---|---|
| C65A | 1,198 cc | SOHC 8V carburated | 4G16 | 65 PS (48 kW) | 90 N⋅m (66 lb⋅ft) | FWD | 5-speed KM201 MT; 5-speed F5M21 MT | | 4-door sedan | Greece | 1988–1992 |
| C51A; C51V; C61A | 1,298 cc | SOHC 8V carburated | 4G13 | Japan: 67 PS (49 kW); Europe: 69 PS (51 kW) | Japan: 104 N⋅m (77 lb⋅ft); Europe: 102 N⋅m (75 lb⋅ft) | FWD | 4-speed KM200 MT; 4-speed F4M21 MT; 5-speed KM201 MT; 5-speed F5M21 MT | 3-speed KM170 AT; 3-speed F3A21 AT | 3-door hatchback/panel van 4-door sedan 5-door liftback | Global (excl. Australia, USA) | 1987–1992 |
| C51A; C51V; C61A | 1,298 cc | SOHC 12V carburated | 4G13 | 79 PS (58 kW) | 106 N⋅m (78 lb⋅ft) | FWD | 4-speed KM200 MT; 4-speed F4M21 MT; 5-speed KM201 MT; 5-speed F5M21 MT | 3-speed KM170 AT; 3-speed F3A21 AT | 3-door hatchback/panel van 4-door sedan 5-door liftback | Global (excl. Europe, USA, Australia) | 1989–1991 |
| C51A; C51V; C61A | 1,298 cc | SOHC 12V EFI | 4G13 | 75 PS (55 kW) | 108 N⋅m (80 lb⋅ft) | FWD | 4-speed KM200 MT; 4-speed F4M21 MT; 5-speed KM201 MT; 5-speed F5M21 MT | 3-speed KM170 AT; 3-speed F3A21 AT | 5-door liftback | Europe | 1992–1995 |
| C52A; C62A; C72A; C82A | 1,468 cc | SOHC 8V carburated | 4G15 | 75 PS (55 kW) | 118 N⋅m (87 lb⋅ft) | FWD; 4WD | 4-speed KM200 MT; 4-speed F4M21 MT; 5-speed KM201 MT; 5-speed F5M21 MT; 5-speed KM221 MT AWD; 5-speed W5M31 MT 4WD | 3-speed F3A21 AT; 4-speed KM176 AT; 4-speed F4A21 AT; 4-speed W4A31 AT 4WD | 3-door hatchback 4-door sedan 5-door liftback | Global; Opt. 4WD for Japan | 1987–1990 |
| C52A; C62A; C72A; C82A | 1,468 cc | SOHC 8V EFI | 4G15 | 84 PS (62 kW) | 122 N⋅m (90 lb⋅ft) | FWD | 4-speed KM200 MT; 4-speed F4M21 MT; 5-speed KM201 MT; 5-speed F5M21 MT; 5-speed KM221 MT AWD; 5-speed W5M31 MT 4WD | 3-speed F3A21 AT; 4-speed KM176 AT; 4-speed F4A21 AT; 4-speed W4A31 AT 4WD | 3-door hatchback 4-door sedan 5-door liftback | Japan; Europe; USA (excl. liftback); Australia | 1988–1990 |
| C52A; C62A; C72A; C82A | 1,468 cc | SOHC 12V carburated | 4G15 | 84 PS (62 kW) | 122 N⋅m (90 lb⋅ft) | FWD; 4WD | 4-speed KM200 MT; 4-speed F4M21 MT; 5-speed KM201 MT; 5-speed F5M21 MT; 5-speed KM221 MT AWD; 5-speed W5M31 MT 4WD | 3-speed F3A21 AT; 4-speed KM176 AT; 4-speed F4A21 AT; 4-speed W4A31 AT 4WD | 3-door hatchback 4-door sedan 5-door liftback | Global (excl. Europe, USA); Opt. 4WD for Japan | 1990–1992 |
| C52A; C62A; C72A; C82A | 1,468 cc | SOHC 12V EFI | 4G15 | Japan: 100 PS (74 kW); Europe: 90 PS (66 kW) | Japan: 130 N⋅m (96 lb⋅ft); Europe: 126 N⋅m (93 lb⋅ft) | FWD | 4-speed KM200 MT; 4-speed F4M21 MT; 5-speed KM201 MT; 5-speed F5M21 MT; 5-speed KM221 MT AWD; 5-speed W5M31 MT 4WD | 3-speed F3A21 AT; 4-speed KM176 AT; 4-speed F4A21 AT; 4-speed W4A31 AT 4WD | 3-door hatchback 4-door sedan 5-door liftback | Japan; USA; Europe; Australia | 1989–1992 |
| C53A; C63A; C73A; C83A | 1,595 cc | DOHC 16V EFI N/A | 4G61 | Japan early: 125 PS (92 kW); Japan late: 130 PS (96 kW); Europe: 124 PS (91 kW); USA: 123 hp (92 kW) | Japan early: 137 N⋅m (101 lb⋅ft); Japan late: 144 N⋅m (106 lb⋅ft); Europe: 142 N⋅m (105 lb⋅ft); USA: 142 N⋅m (105 lb⋅ft) | FWD; 4WD | 5-speed KM206 MT; 5-speed F5M22 MT; 5-speed KM221 MT AWD; 5-speed W5M31 MT 4WD | 4-speed KM176 AT; 4-speed F4A21 AT; 4-speed W4A31 AT 4WD | 3-door hatchback 4-door sedan 5-door liftback | Global; Opt. 4WD for Japan | 1988–1992 |
| C53A; C63A; C73A; C83A | 1,595 cc | DOHC 16V EFI Turbo | 4G61 | 135 hp (101 kW) | 191 N⋅m (141 lb⋅ft) | FWD | 5-speed KM210 MT; 5-speed F5M31 MT; 5-speed KM221 MT AWD; 5-speed W5M33 MT 4WD | | 3-door hatchback | USA | 1988–1989 |
| C53A; C63A; C73A; C83A | 1,595 cc | DOHC 16V EFI Turbo | 4G61 | 145 PS (107 kW) | 206 N⋅m (152 lb⋅ft) | FWD; 4WD | 5-speed KM210 MT; 5-speed F5M31 MT; 5-speed KM221 MT AWD; 5-speed W5M33 MT 4WD | | 3-door hatchback 4-door sedan 5-door liftback | Japan | 1987–1989 |
| C53A; C63A; C73A; C83A | 1,595 cc | DOHC 16V EFI Turbo | 4G61 | 160 PS (118 kW) | 221 N⋅m (163 lb⋅ft) | FWD; 4WD | 5-speed KM210 MT; 5-speed F5M31 MT; 5-speed KM221 MT AWD; 5-speed W5M33 MT 4WD | | 3-door hatchback 4-door sedan 5-door liftback | Japan | 1989–1991 |
| C66A; C76A | 1,597 cc | SOHC 16V EFI | 4G92 | 113 PS (83 kW) | 137 N⋅m (101 lb⋅ft) | FWD; 4WD | 5-speed F5M22 MT; W5M31 MT 4WD | 4-speed F4A21 AT | 5-door liftback | Europe; Australia (FWD only) | 1992–1995 |
| C77A | 1,755 cc | SOHC 8V EFI | 4G37 | 97 PS (71 kW) | 141 N⋅m (104 lb⋅ft) | 4WD | 5-speed W5M31 MT 4WD | | 5-door liftback | Europe | 1989–1992 |
| C58A; C68A | 1,836 cc | DOHC 16V EFI | 4G67 | 136 PS (100 kW) | 162 N⋅m (119 lb⋅ft) | FWD | 5-speed F5M22 MT | | 3-door hatchback 4-door sedan 5-door liftback | Global (excl. Japan, USA, Australia) | 1989–1992 |
| C69A | 1,834 cc | DOHC 16V EFI | 4G93 | 140 PS (103 kW) | 167 N⋅m (123 lb⋅ft) | FWD | 5-speed F5M22 MT | | 5-door liftback | Europe | 1992–1995 |
| C54A; C64A; C74A | 1,795 cc | SOHC 8V N/A diesel | 4D65 | Japan: 61 PS (45 kW); Europe: 60 PS (44 kW) | Japan: 111 N⋅m (82 lb⋅ft); Europe: 113 N⋅m (83 lb⋅ft) | FWD; 4WD | 5-speed KM206 MT; 5-speed F5M22 MT; 5-speed KM221 MT 4WD; 5-speed W5M31 MT 4WD | | 3-door hatchback 4-door sedan 5-door liftback | Japan (excl. hatchback); Europe (FWD only) | 1987–1992 |
| C54A; C64A; C74A | 1,795 cc | SOHC 8V TD | 4D65T | 76 PS (56 kW) | 149 N⋅m (110 lb⋅ft) | 4WD | 5-speed W5M31 MT 4WD | | 3-door hatchback 4-door sedan 5-door liftback | Japan (excl. hatchback) | 1989–1991 |
| C67A | 1,998 cc | SOHC 8V N/A diesel | 4D68 | 68 PS (50 kW) | 123 N⋅m (91 lb⋅ft) | FWD | 5-speed F5M22 MT | | 5-door liftback | Europe (LHD only) | 1992–1995 |

* KM series (1987–1989), F/W series (1989–1995)

== Fourth generation (1991; CA/CB/CC/CD) ==
Fourth generation
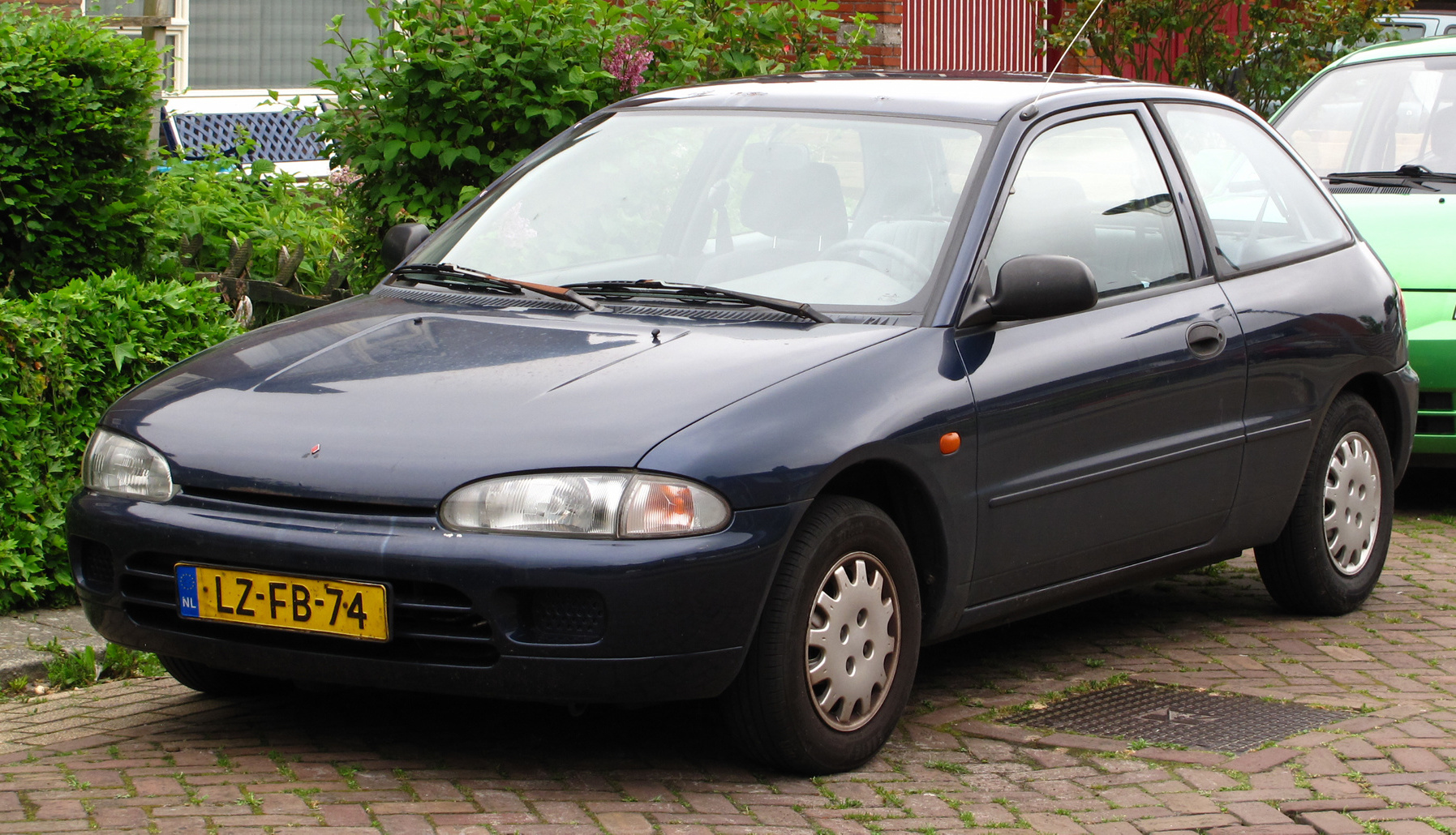
- Mitsubishi Colt (Europe)

Overview
- Model code: CA/CC (hatchback/coupé); CB/CD (sedan/wagon)
- Also called: Mitsubishi Colt (hatchback); Mitsubishi Lancer (sedan/coupé/wagon); Mitsubishi Libero (wagon; Japan and Taiwan); Dodge/Plymouth Colt (sedan/coupé); Eagle Summit (sedan/coupé); Proton Satria (hatchback); Proton Putra (coupé)
- Production: 1991–1995 (6-windowed sedan); 1991–1996 (hatchback/coupé/4-windowed sedan); 1992–2002 (wagon)
- Assembly: Japan: Okazaki (Nagoya Plant); Indonesia: Pademangan, North Jakarta (PT. Krama Yudha Kesuma Motor); New Zealand: Wellington; Philippines: Cainta (Philippine Automotive Manufacturing Corporation); Taiwan: Yangmei (China Motor); Thailand: Laem Chabang (MMTh)
- Designer: Akinori Nakanishi

Body and chassis
- Body style: 2-door coupé; 3-door hatchback; 4-door sedan; 5-door station wagon/van
- Layout: Front-engine, front-wheel-drive (CA/CB); Front-engine, four-wheel-drive (CC/CD)
- Related: Mitsubishi Lancer Evolution I; Mitsubishi Lancer Evolution II; Mitsubishi Lancer Evolution III; Proton Arena; Proton Wira

Powertrain
- Engine: Gasoline: 1298 cc 4G13 I4 (CA/CB1A/V/W); 1468 cc 4G15 I4 (CA/CB/CD2A/V/W); 1496 cc 4G91 I4 (CA/CB/CC/CD3A); 1597 cc 4G92 I4 (CA/CB/CC/CD4A/W); 1597 cc 6A10 V6 (CB6A); 1834 cc 4G93 I4 (CA/CB/CD5A/W); 1834 cc 4G93T turbo I4 (CD5A/W); Diesel: 1795 cc 4D65T turbodiesel I4 (CB/CD7A); 1998 cc 4D68T I4 (CB8A/W); 1998 cc 4D68T turbodiesel I4 (CB/CD8A/V/W)
- Transmission: 4-speed manual; 5-speed F5M21/22 manual; 3-speed F3A21 automatic; 4-speed F4A22 automatic

Dimensions
- Wheelbase: 2,440 mm (96.1 in) (coupé/hatchback); 2,500 mm (98.4 in) (sedan/wagon)
- Length: 3,950 mm (155.5 in) (hatchback); 4,225–4,345 mm (166.3–171.1 in) (coupé); 4,270–4,400 mm (168.1–173.2 in) (Lancer sedan); 4,270–4,420 mm (168.1–174.0 in) (wagon); 4,290 mm (168.9 in) (Mirage sedan)
- Width: 1,680–1,690 mm (66.1–66.5 in)
- Height: 1,365–1,375 mm (53.7–54.1 in) (hatchback/Mirage sedan); 1,385–1,395 mm (54.5–54.9 in) (Lancer sedan); 1,370 mm (53.9 in) (coupé); 1,430–1,530 mm (56.3–60.2 in) (wagon)
- Curb weight: 870–1,140 kg (1,918–2,513 lb) (hatchback); 900–1,210 kg (1,984–2,668 lb) (Lancer sedan); 910–1,200 kg (2,006–2,646 lb) (Mirage sedan); 910–1,070 kg (2,006–2,359 lb) (coupé); 990–1,280 kg (2,183–2,822 lb) (wagon)

In October 1991, the fourth generation Mirage made its debut for the Japanese market alongside the related Lancer. Departing from the previous series, the new Mirage adopted a much rounder body shape — a change duplicated by much of the automotive industry in the early-1990s. As before, the Japanese Mirage lineup comprised the three-door hatchback and sedan (now with a six-window glasshouse), plus a new coupé body type suffixed Asti. The sportier Mirage lineup featured a tapered hood, elliptical headlamps and taillights, and a narrow single-port grille.

Conversely, the Lancer sedan variant diverged with more angular styling characterized by the more upright design. The Lancer also featured re-shaped fenders, less rounded headlamps, larger taillights, a larger dual-port grille and retained a traditional four-window glasshouse body style. The Lancer lineup also expanded to include a station wagon/van, the Mitsubishi Libero, launched in May 1992. The Libero was sold as the Lancer Wagon in most export markets, where its introduction coincided with a small update for 1993, featuring new bumpers and adjustments to the engine lineup. The Lancer wagon was sold until 2003 in the Australian and New Zealand markets, primarily for fleet buyers. The wagon was still listed on a dealer website until 2012 in Belize.

Naming of the various models for export was many and varied. The three-door was restricted to the Colt name, but the Mirage Asti coupé was often badged Lancer as well. With the sedan, export markets only retailed the four-window variation and occurred under the Lancer name like in Japan.

=== Hatchback / Coupé ===
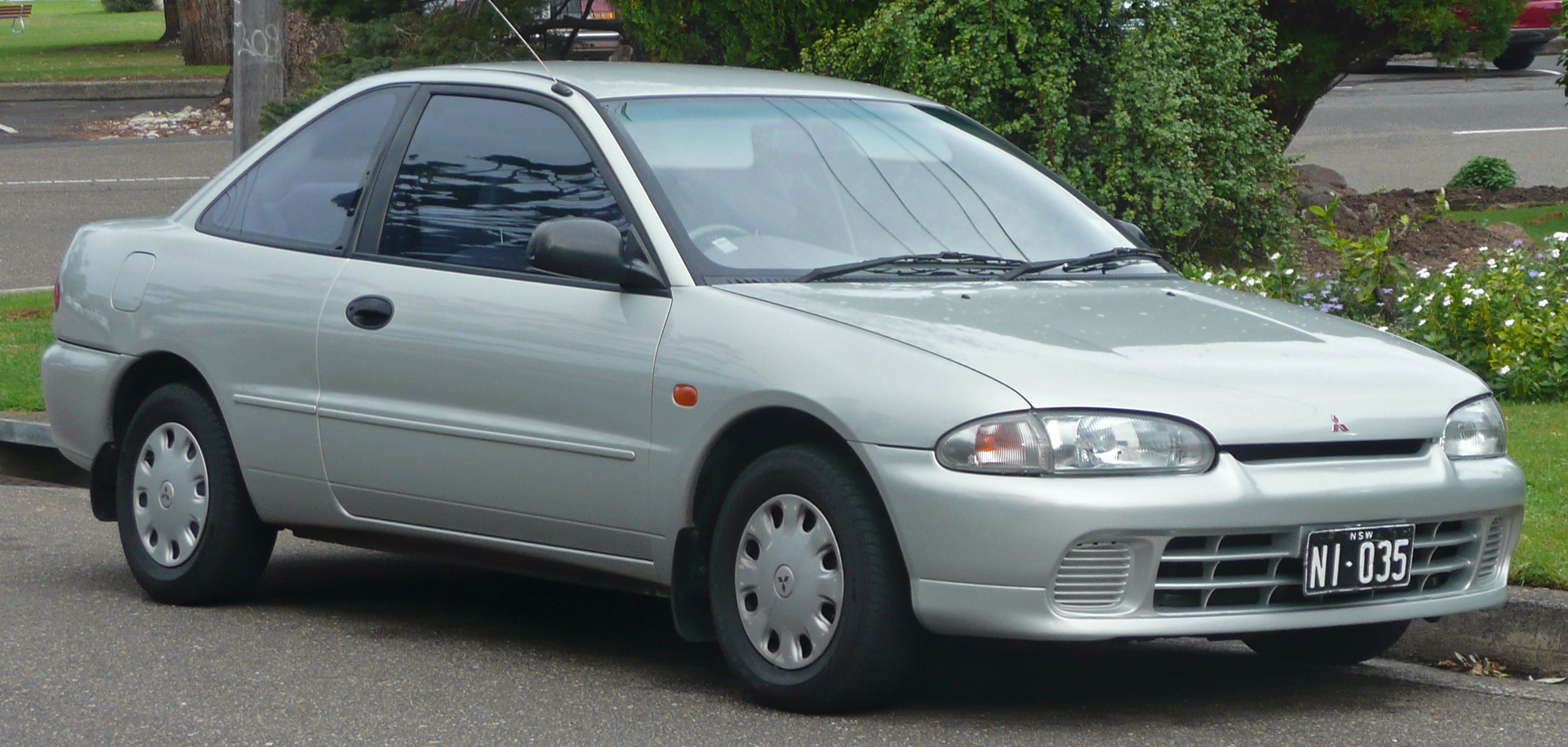
Lancer coupé

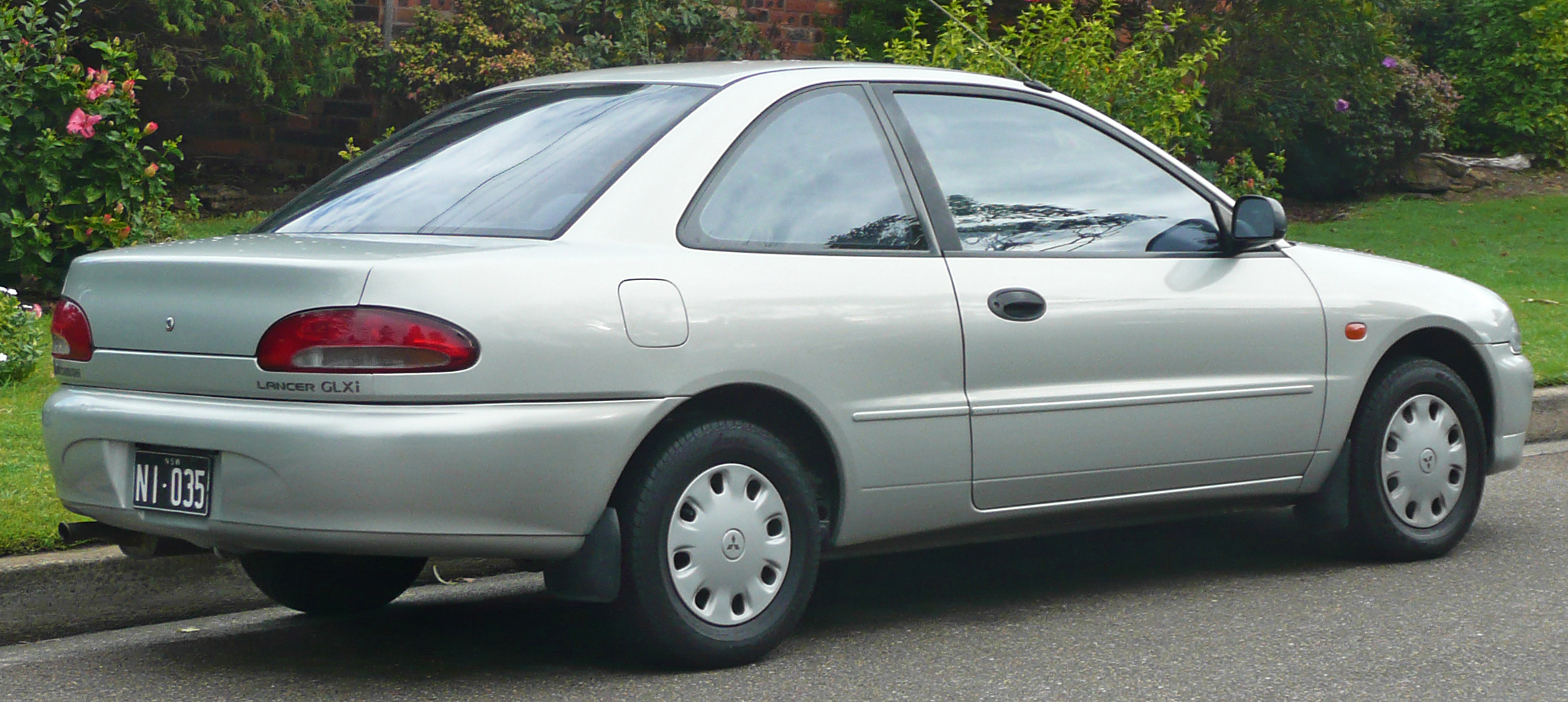
Lancer coupé

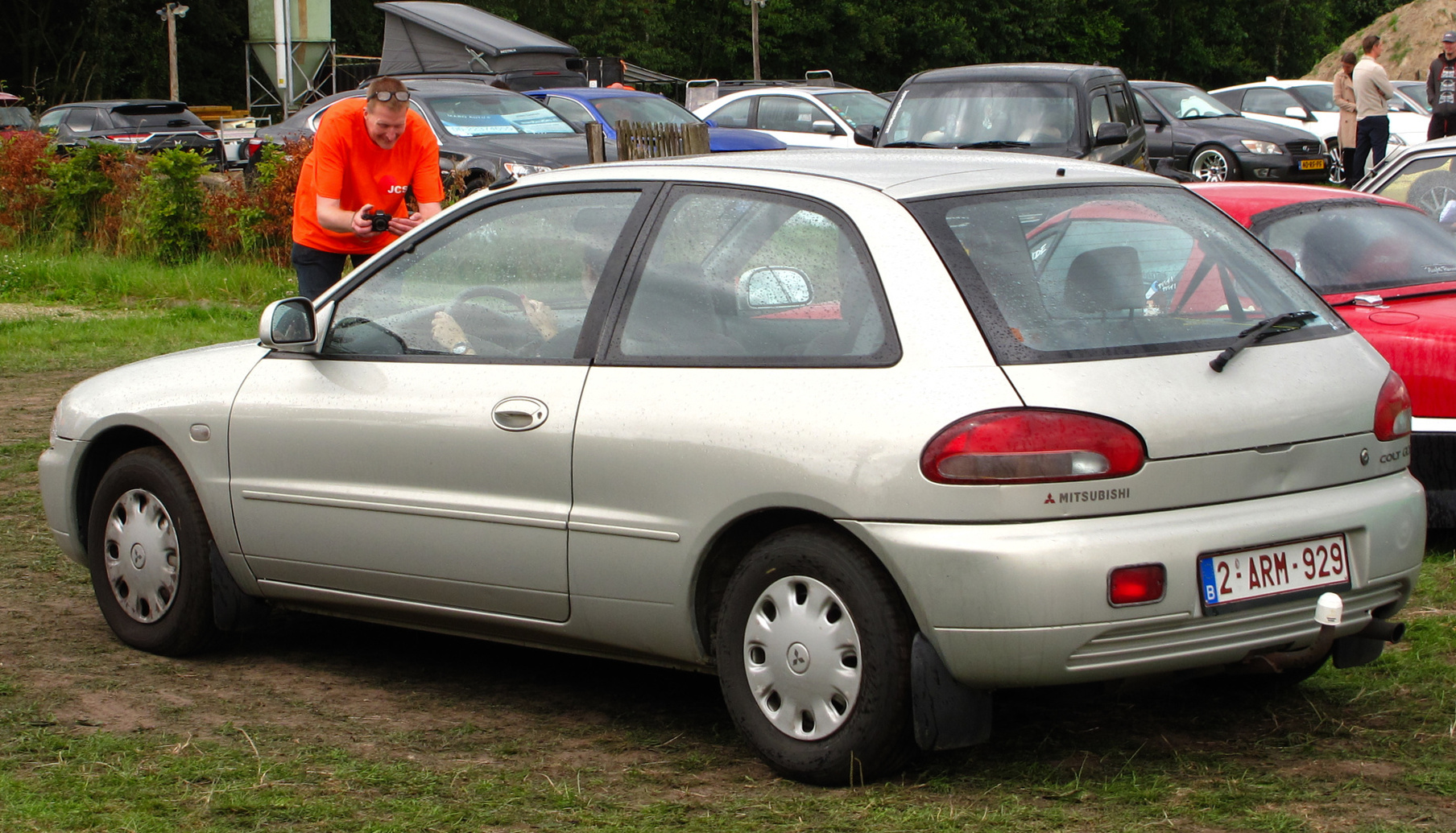
Colt hatchback

=== Station wagon ===
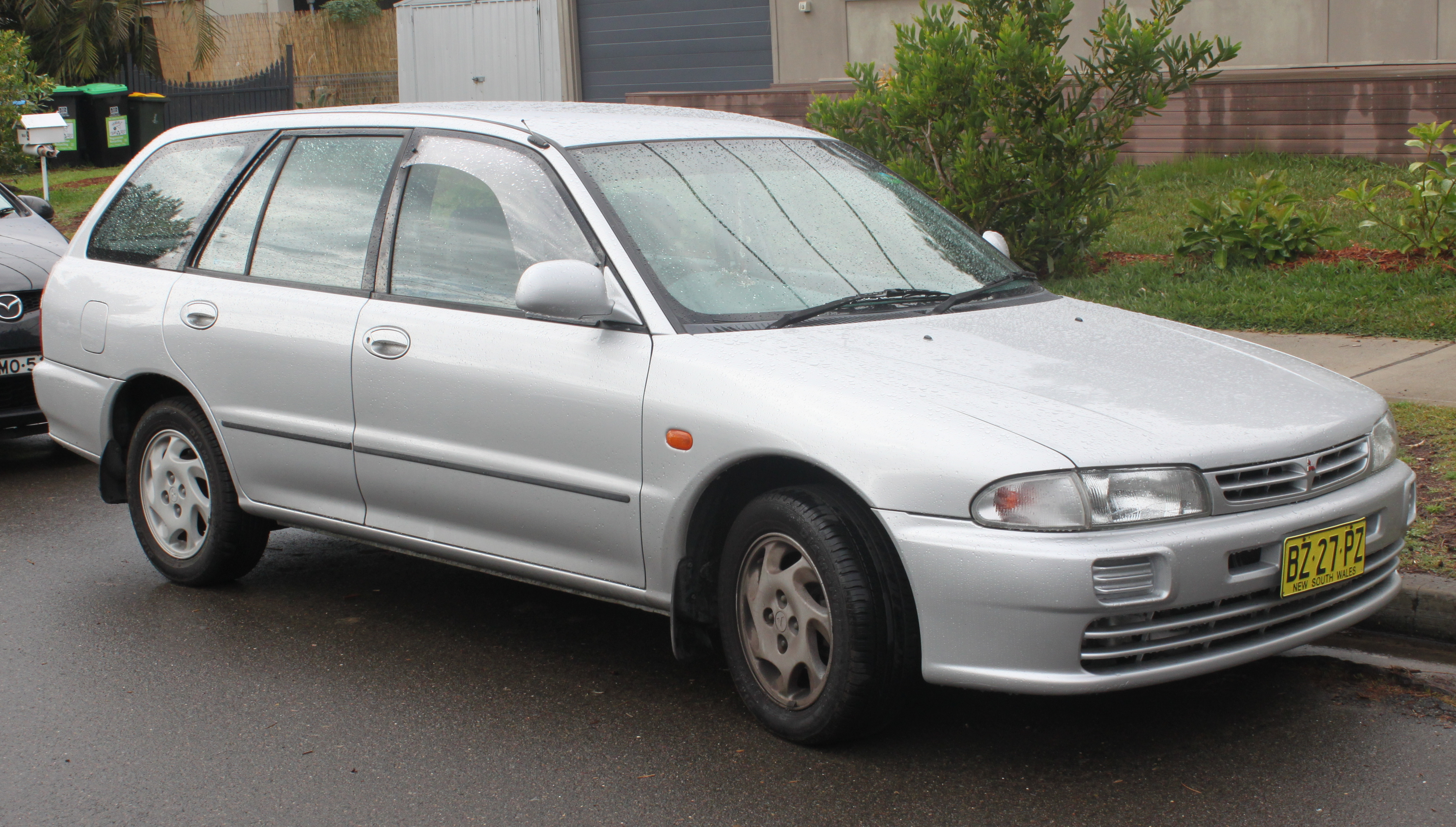
Lancer station wagon

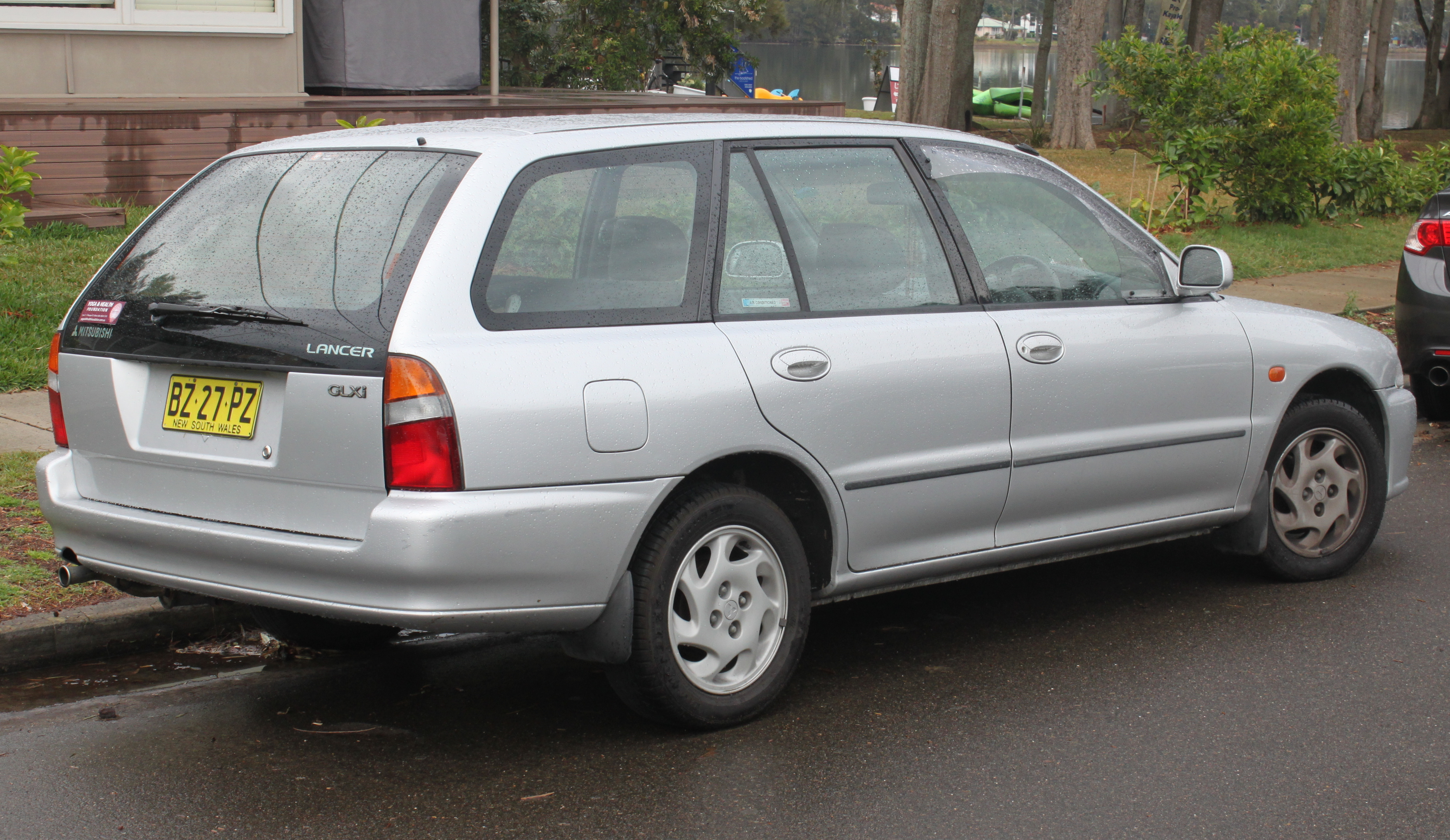
Rear view

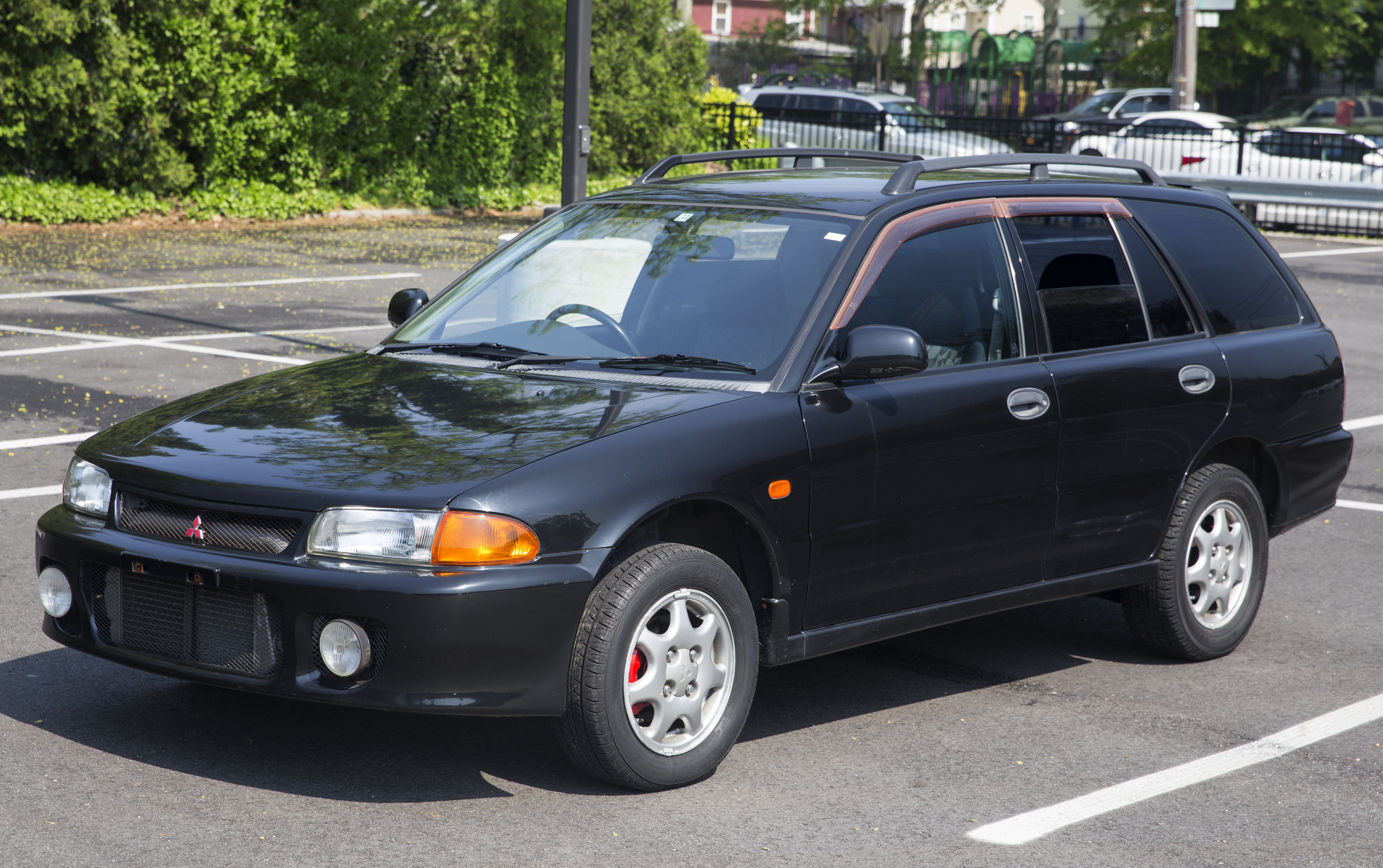
Libero GT (Japan)

=== Sedan ===
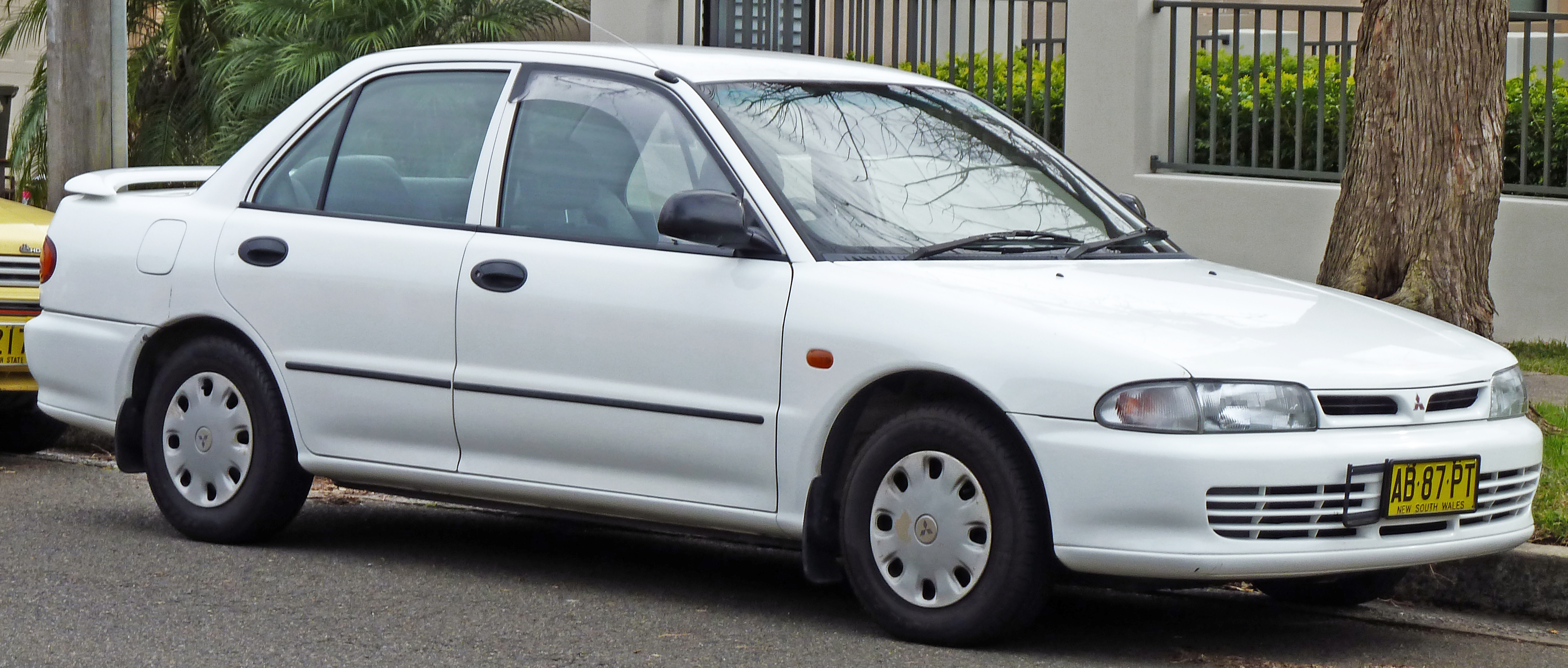
Lancer sedan (4-windowed)

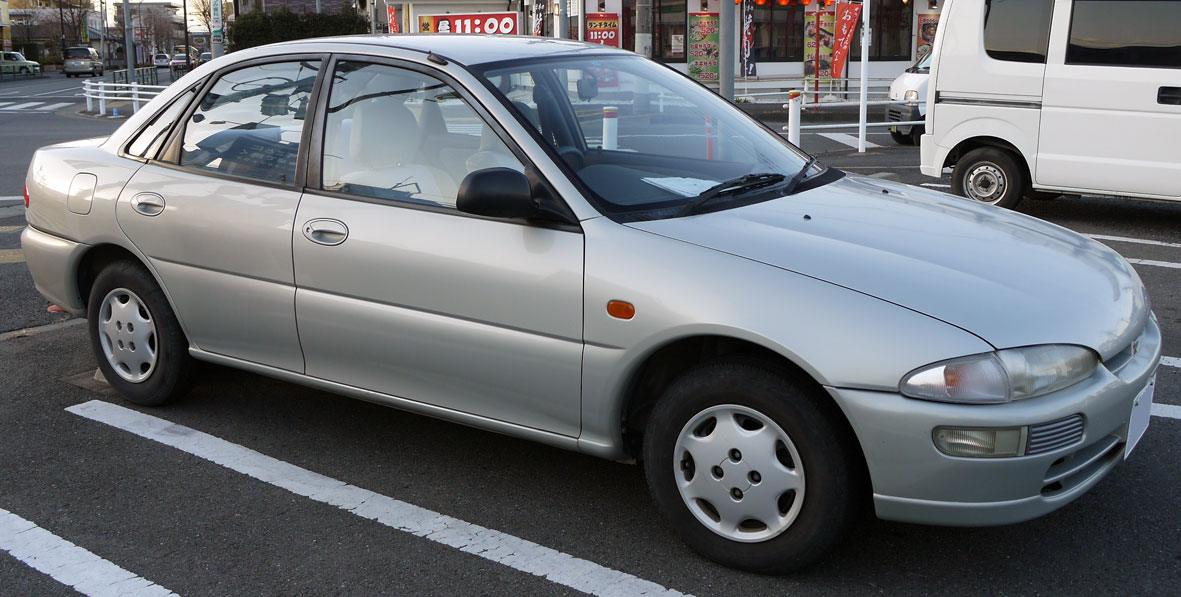
Mirage sedan (6-windowed)

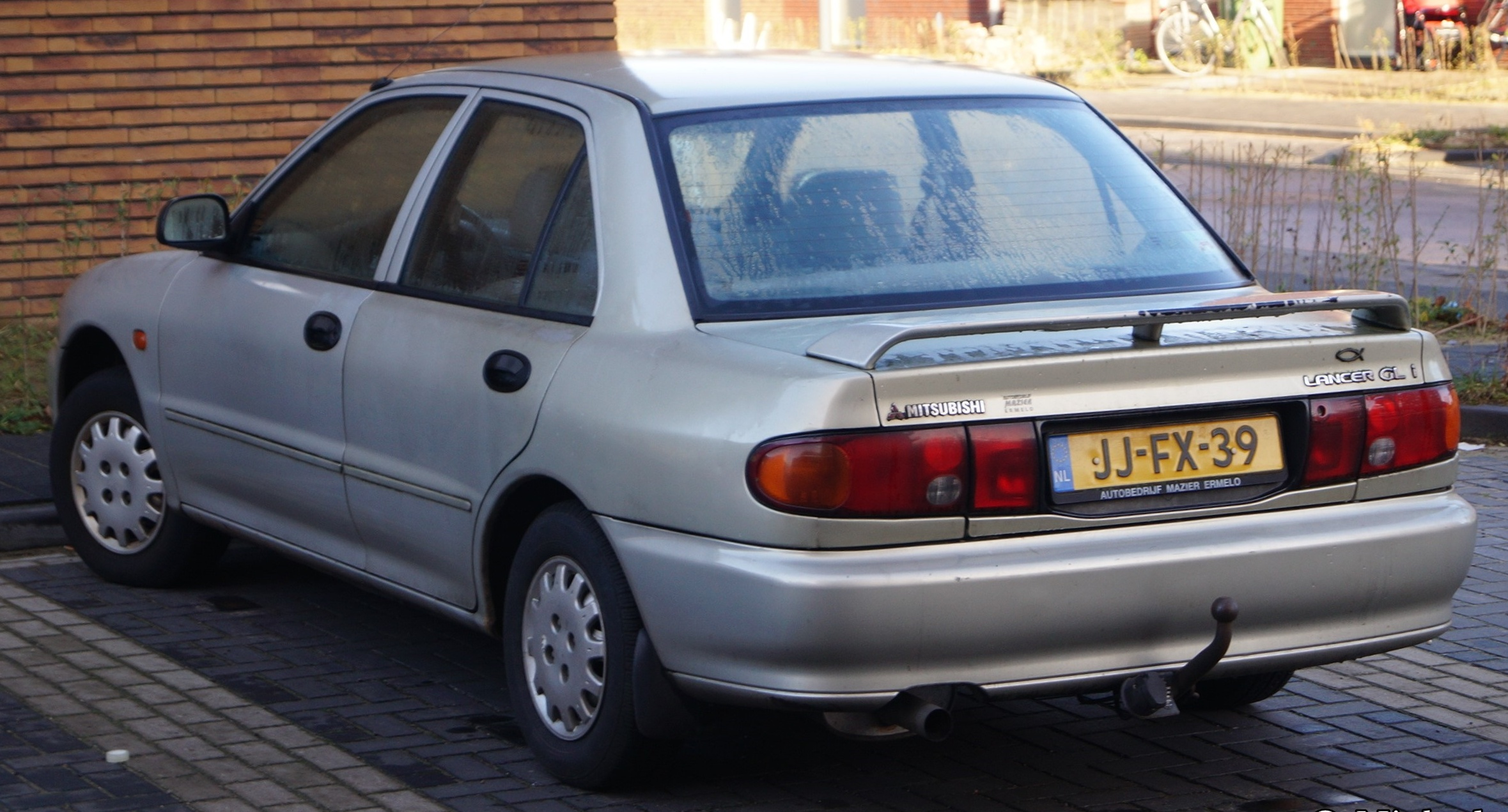
Lancer sedan (4-windowed)

=== Interior ===
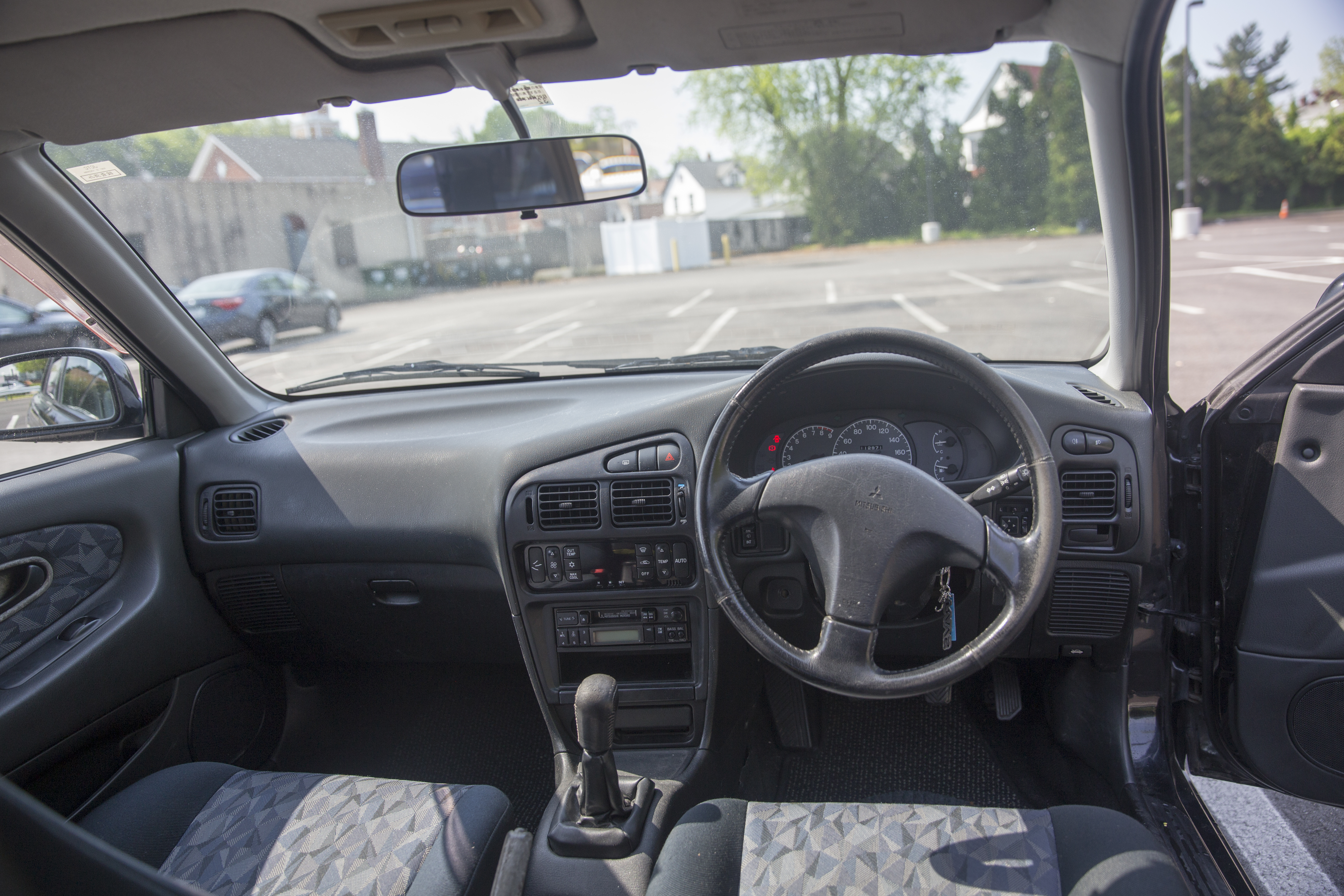
Libero GT

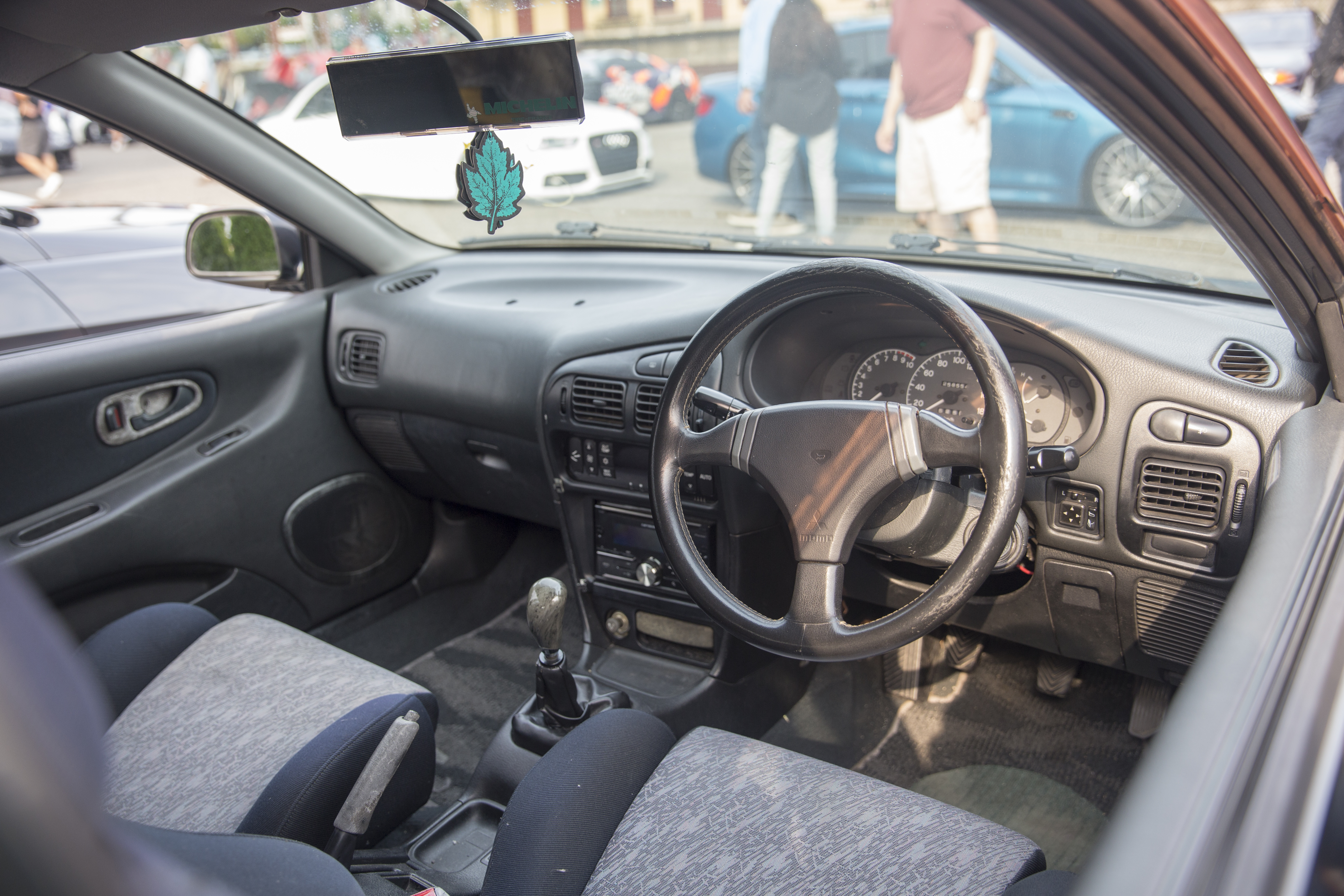
Mirage Cyborg/Lancer GSR

Mitsubishi's powertrain choices were vast with this new platform. Front-wheel drive was most common, with all-wheel drive available for some models. Engines ranged from 1.3- to 1.8-liter gasoline inline-fours, plus 1.8 and 2.0-liter diesels. Notably, a gasoline V6 engine variant displacing just 1.6-liters was also offered, making it the smallest ever mass-produced V6.

Many performance models were offered in this generation. The entry-level model, called the Mirage R (and the early RS), was powered by a 1.6-liter DOHC inline-four engine that produced 145 PS (143 hp; 107 kW), while the MIVEC version of the same engine produced a higher output at 175 PS (173 hp; 129 kW) and was called the Mirage Cyborg/RS and Lancer MR in Japan. The 1.8-liter turbocharged inline-four, producing 195–205 PS (192–202 hp; 143–151 kW), and an all-wheel-drive system was also offered for the Lancer GSR/RS. In November 1992, a Group A rally homologation model based on the GSR/RS was introduced as the Lancer GSR Evolution, powered by a turbocharged 2.0-liter 4G63T engine from the successful Galant VR-4. In January 1994, the high-performance range was expanded with the arrival of the Libero GT. It was essentially the station wagon version of the Lancer GSR, but delivered a higher output of 215 PS (212 hp; 158 kW) and featured a Lancer GSR Evolution front bumper.

In March 1993, an electric vehicle version of the wagon was released to Japan named the "Libero EV" and powered by a lead-acid battery. The wagon was created in collaboration with Tokyo Electric Power Company and sold 36 units to government agencies and major corporations. It achieved a driving range of 165 km (103 mi) on a single charge while driving at a constant speed of 40 km/h (25 mph). The manufacturer's suggested retail price was ¥11,230,000 (roughly around $100,000 in 1993), four times more than the then-newly introduced Lancer GSR Evolution. The Libero EV was later improved with a new nickel-cadmium battery, which extended the driving range up to 250 km (155 mi).

=== Export markets ===
Australia

Australian market versions of this generation were released in late 1992 and were officially referred to as the CC series Lancer. Buyers had the choice of the Lancer coupé (available in GL and GLXi equipment levels), sedan (GL, Executive, and GSR), and wagon (Executive). Five-speed manual transmission came fitted as standard, with all variants except the GSR available with automatic—three gears for the base coupé and sedan—and a four-speed unit for the remainder of the lineup. The GL coupé and sedan featured the 1.5-liter carbureted motor, with the 1.8-liter fuel-injected engine reserved for the rest of the series. All engines except in the GSR are SOHC design; the GSR featured DOHC, plus a turbocharger and intercooler.

North America

This model launched in the United States for the 1993 model year as the Mirage sedan (based on Lancer) and coupé with all variants now sourced from Japan. Like before, the North American specification featured longer bumpers, and has drag coefficient of Cd=0.29 (coupe) and Cd=0.31 (sedan), respectively. The bumpers were also standard for the Japanese market kyōshūsha (driving school vehicle), which later adopted for the facelifted Lancer sedan in Taiwan and Thailand,.

The same body shapes were also sold as the Dodge and Plymouth Colt in both the United States and Canada. The six-window greenhouse sedan was sold in these countries as the Eagle Summit alongside the coupé and Lancer-based sedan. For the Mitsubishi branded versions sold only in the United States, the coupé and four-window sedan were offered in base, S, ES and LS trim levels. Five-speed manual transmission was standard, although an automatic was optional on all Mirages except the S coupé. Mitsubishi kept the preceding generation's base 1.5-liter 4G15 engine with 92 hp (69 kW), but fitted the ES and LS sedans with the new 1.8-liter 4G93 engine rated at 113 hp (84 kW). For the 1994 model year, Mitsubishi introduced a driver's airbag, the LS sedan lost its optional anti-lock brakes, and the LS coupé gained the 1.8-liter engine previously exclusive to sedans. The 1994 model year was the last year of retail sales for Mirage sedans (which became limited to fleets) and for the Dodge and Plymouth Colts altogether (replaced by Chrysler's new, American-designed Neon), although the Eagle Summit sedan and coupé remained on sale alongside the Mirage coupé through to 1996. As a consequence, only S and LS Mirage coupés returned for model year 1995, and both benefitted from a new passenger's side airbag and covered center console (and therefore the deletion of the motorized front seatbelts). The 1995 Mirage LS coupé gained uprated 14-inch wheels, but deleted access to power windows, power door locks, and cruise control.

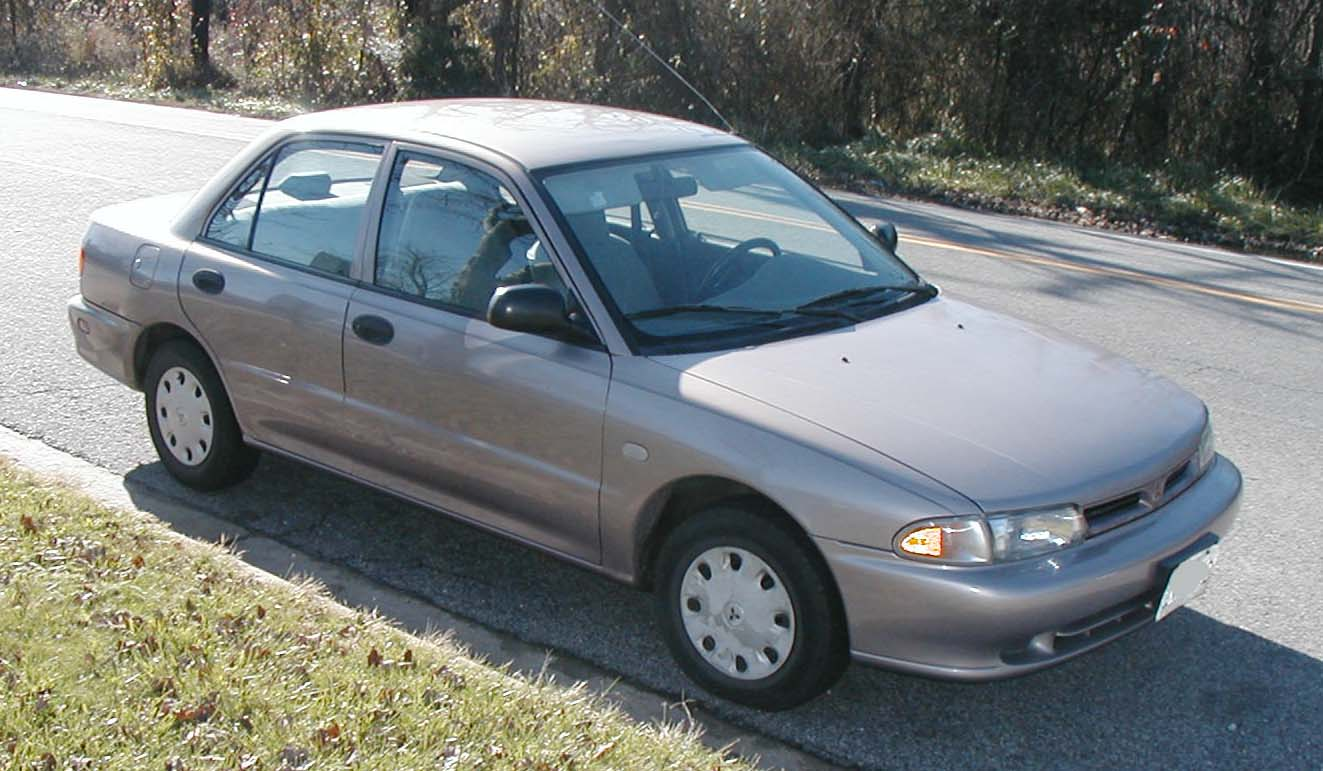
US-market Mirage sedan

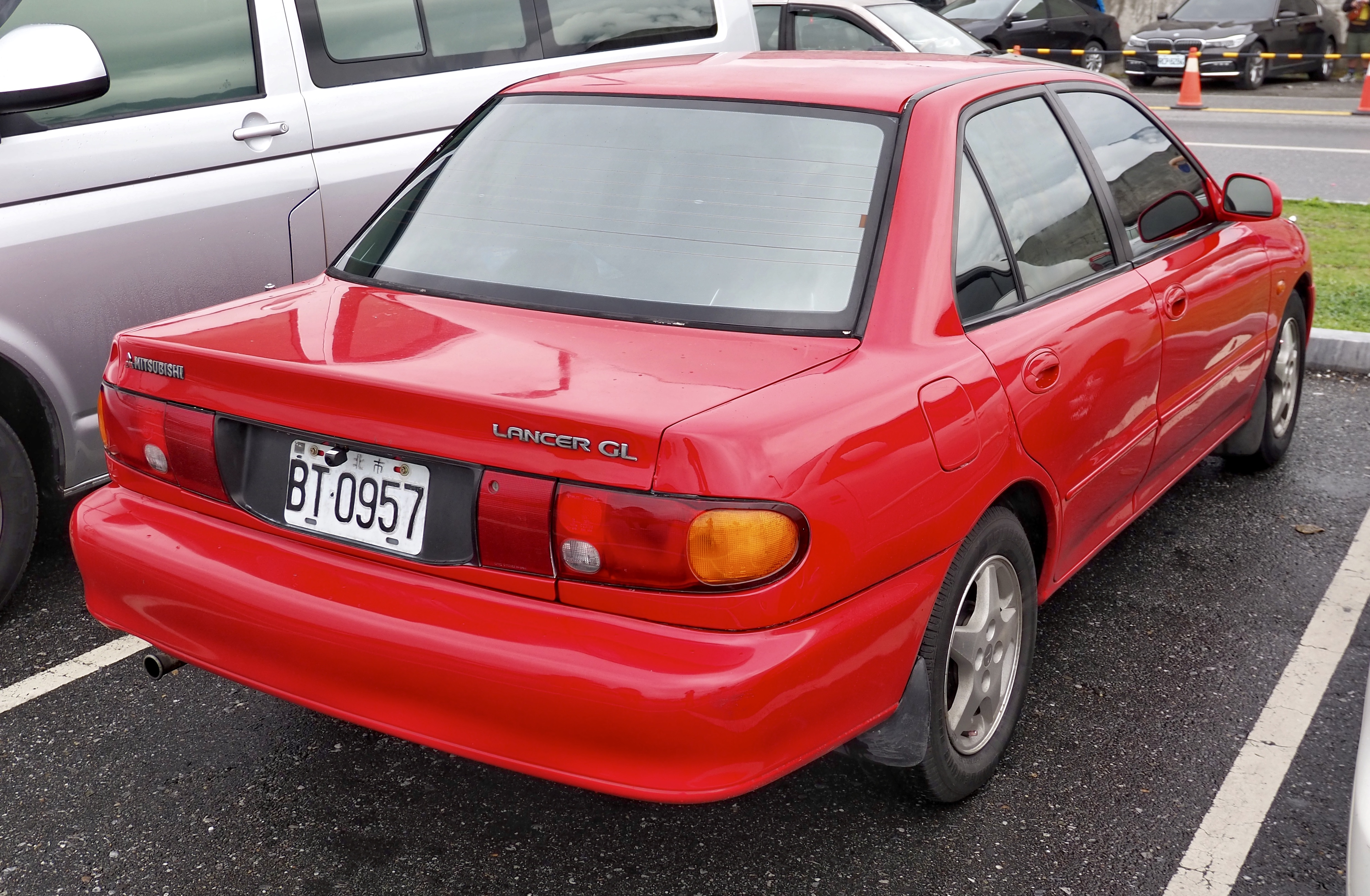
Rear view of Taiwanese-market Lancer

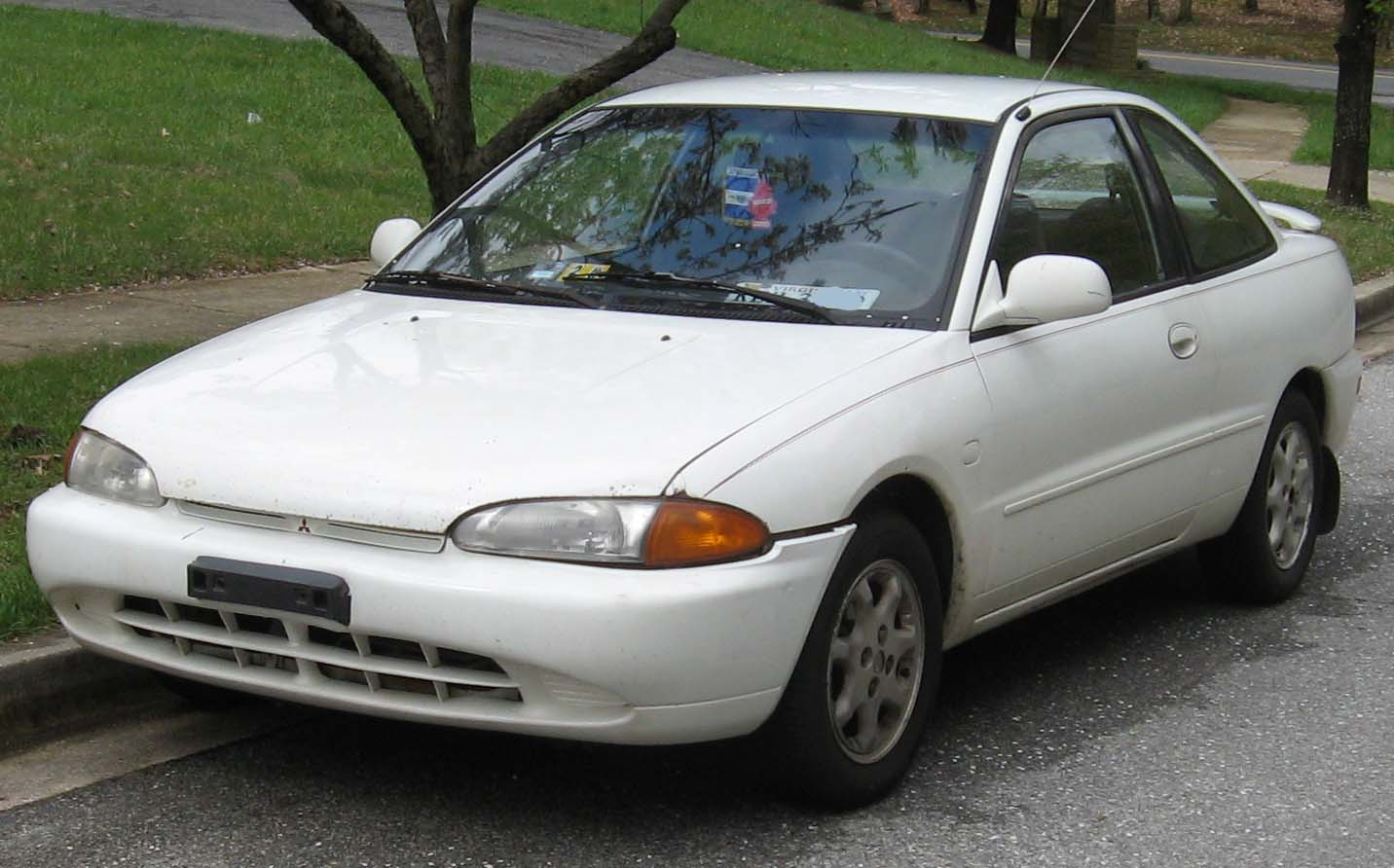
US-market Mirage coupé

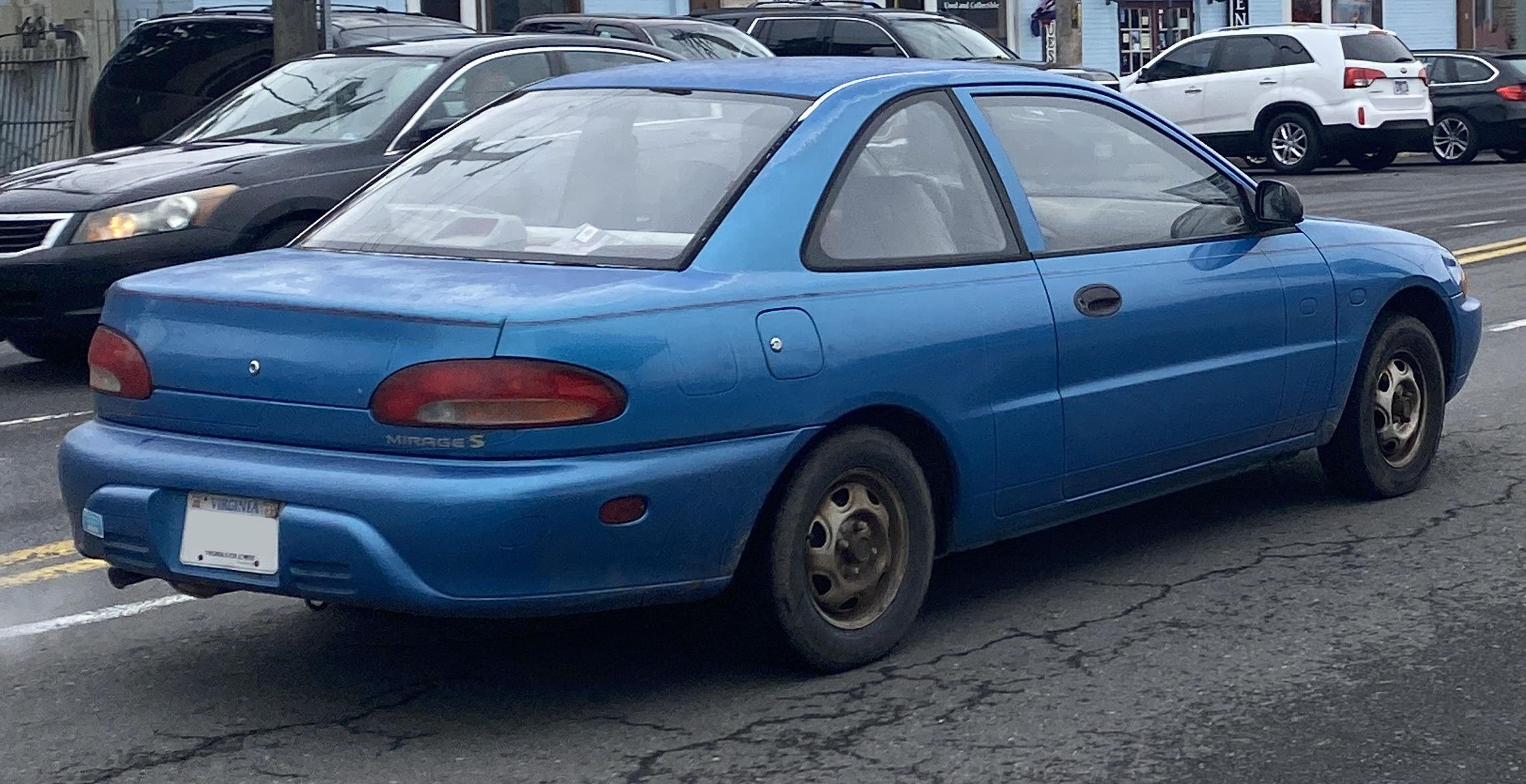
Rear view of US-market Mirage coupé

Europe

European buyers received the hatchback as a Colt, while the sedan and station wagon were sold with Lancer badging. The coupé was not sold in Europe. The sportiest version was powered by a 1.8-liter, DOHC engine rated at 140 PS (138 hp; 103 kW); it was badged "Colt GTi". The smallest engine was the 1.3-liter, 12-valve four, producing 75 PS (55 kW) in fuel injected form. Like the previous generation, the all-wheel-drive model was also available with a 1.6-liter engine. A 2.0-liter naturally aspirated diesel engine was also offered exclusively for the sedan and wagon.

Proton versions

Mitsubishi granted Proton in Malaysia a license to the fourth generation design from 1993 — it remained in produced in a distant form until 2010. The first variant produced, the sedan was badged Wira (1993–2007) and was complemented by a Proton-designed five-door Wira Aeroback liftback (1993–2004). Malaysian manufacture of other variants commenced later, with the three-door Satria (1994–2005) and Putra coupé (1996–2000; and 2004–2005). Proton then developed a coupé utility variant which came to fruition in 2002 as the Arena, lasting until 2010.

== Fifth generation (1995; CJ/CK/CL/CM) ==
Fifth generation
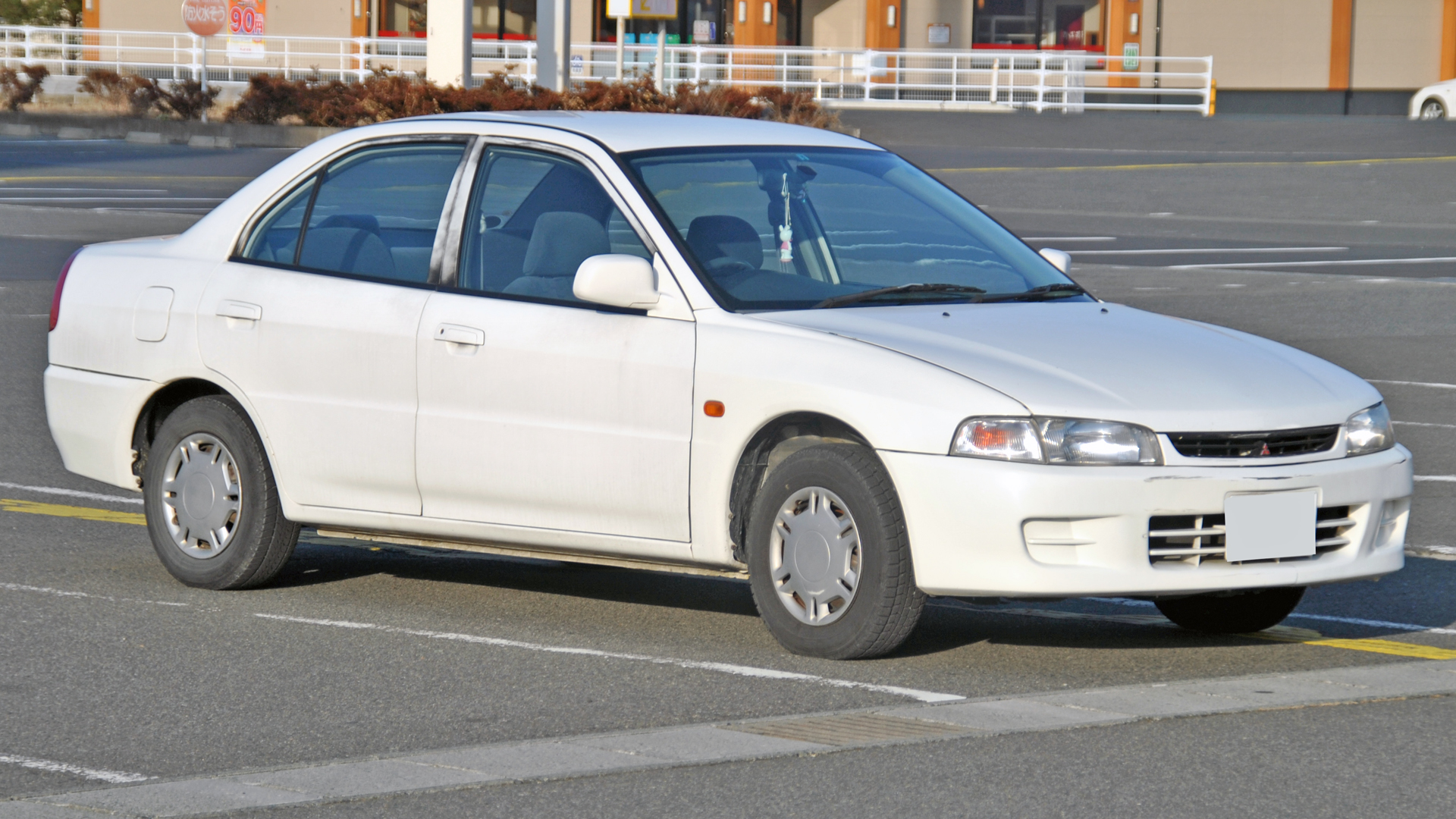
- Mitsubishi Mirage sedan (pre-facelift)

Overview
- Model code: CJ/CL (hatchback); CK/CM (sedan)
- Also called: Mitsubishi Colt (hatchback); Mitsubishi Lancer (sedan); Mitsubishi Signo (sedan, Venezuela); Mitsubishi Virage (sedan, Taiwan); Soueast Lioncel (sedan, China/export); Soueast V3 Lingyue (sedan, China)
- Production: 1995–2003 (Japan); 1996–2000 (Taiwan); 1997–2002 (Indonesia); 1998–2012 (India); 2003–2019 (China); 2004–2010 (Venezuela)
- Assembly: Japan: Okazaki (Nagoya Plant); China: Fuzhou (Soueast Motors); India: Tiruvallur (Hindustan Motors); Taiwan: Yangmei (China Motor Corporation); Thailand: Laem Chabang (MMTh); Indonesia: Pademangan (PT. Krama Yudha Kesuma Motor); Philippines: Cainta (MMPC); Venezuela: Barcelona (MMC Automotriz); New Zealand: Porirua (MMNZ)

Body and chassis
- Body style: 2-door coupé; 3-door hatchback; 4-door sedan
- Layout: Front-engine, front-wheel-drive (CJ/CK); Front-engine, four-wheel-drive (CL/CM)
- Related: Mitsubishi Lancer Evolution IV; Mitsubishi Lancer Evolution V; Mitsubishi Lancer Evolution VI

Powertrain
- Engine: Gasoline: 1.3 L 4G13 I4 (CJ/CK1A); 1.5 L 4A91 I4 (China; Soueast Lingyue); 1.5 L 4G15 SOHC/DOHC I4 (CJ/CK/CL/CM2A); 1.6 L 4G18 I4 (China; Lancer Classic and Soueast Lioncel); 1.6 L 4G92 SOHC/DOHC I4 (CJ/CK4A); 1.8 L 4G93 I4 SOHC/DOHC (CK5A); 1.8 L 4G93T turbo I4 (CM5A); 1.8 L 6A11 V6 (CK6A); Diesel: 2.0 L 4D68 I4 (India; CK8A); 2.0 L 4D68T turbo-diesel I4 (CK/CM8A)
- Transmission: 5-speed manual; 4-speed INVECS-II automatic (Thailand and Philippines); CVT (China); 6-speed AMT (China)

Dimensions
- Wheelbase: 2,415 mm (95.1 in) (hatchback/coupé); 2,500 mm (98.4 in) (sedan)
- Length: 3,870–3,890 mm (152.4–153.1 in) (hatchback); 4,180–4,270 mm (164.6–168.1 in) (coupé); 4,290–4,410 mm (168.9–173.6 in) (sedan)
- Width: 1,680 mm (66.1 in) (hatchback); 1,690 mm (66.5 in) (coupé); 1,690–1,700 mm (66.5–66.9 in) (sedan)
- Height: 1,365–1,375 mm (53.7–54.1 in) (hatchback/coupé); 1,395–1,415 mm (54.9–55.7 in) (sedan)
- Curb weight: 920–1,090 kg (2,030–2,400 lb) (hatchback); 940–1,100 kg (2,070–2,430 lb) (coupé); 940–1,260 kg (2,070–2,780 lb) (sedan)

The release of the fifth generation Mirage to Japan in October 1995 introduced a rationalized lineup as a result of the fragile post-bubble economy in Japan. Three body types were issued: first, the three-door hatchback and sedan, then in December 1995, the two-door coupé (Asti). While the sedan grew slightly in size, the hatchback and coupé shrunk modestly due the 25 mm (1 in) shorter wheelbase. It was bumped from the subcompact class to compact in the United States. Whereas the previous Mirage sedan sold in Japan featured a six-window profile, the 1995 redesign shared its styling with the Lancer except for minor differences in trim.

For the Lancer, these included a different trunk lid, amber front turn signal lamps, and a restyled grille garnish. No station wagon of this generation was offered, although the previous generation wagon continued over the entire fifth generation production run. While only the sedan formed part of the Lancer range in Japan, both the coupé and sedan were labeled as Mirage and Lancer in export markets.

A minor facelift arrived in 1997. Of note, the Lancer sedan featured a new grille and reshaped inner-portions of the headlamps to better differentiate it from the Mirage donor model. Both the coupé and sedan benefited from redesigned tail lamps, whereas the three-door received a redesigned front bumper incorporating a larger grille and taillights with clear turn signals. In July 1997, a classically styled version of the Mirage hatchback became available in Japan, called the Mirage Modarc. The Modarc featured chrome for the grille, side mirrors, door handles, and bumper strips; it also included fog lights and optional alloy wheels. The sedans range were also extended with arrival of the luxury Exceed trim; it featured a horizontal chrome grille and wood interior.

Most of the drivetrains from the previous generation were retained to save development cost. The 1.5-liter DOHC engine was changed from the 4G91 to 4G15 in Japan – export markets remained with the 12-valve SOHC version – the V6 engine was enlarged to a 1.8-lter unit, while the 1.8-liter turbodiesel engine for the Mirage sedan was discontinued.

Some high-performance models below the Lancer Evolution were also offered for this generation, despite the unfavorable economic situation. All entry-level performance models retained the older 175 PS (129 kW) 1.6-liter MIVEC engine, which was also exported to Hong Kong and Singapore as the Lancer MIVEC. Meanwhile, the 205 PS (151 kW) 1.8-liter turbocharged model was offered for both the Lancer GSR and Mirage VR-X sedans, alongside the older Libero GT station wagon until 1999.

Although a new, substantially larger and more expensive generation of Lancer sedan arrived in 2000, many export markets retained the Mirage-derived model up until 2003 when Japanese manufacture concluded and Mitsubishi retired the Mirage nameplate worldwide. This is especially true of the hatchback and coupé which were not redesigned due to Mitsubishi's financial troubles. In other markets, the newer sedan often co-existed with the old as a more premium offering. Mitsubishi eventually replaced the three-door in 2005 for Europe only with the three-door Colt—the name previously used in many export markets to denote the Mirage from 1978 onwards. A five-door variant of the Colt had earlier been released in 2002. By 2003, the only Mirage sold in Japan was the coupé, now without the Asti designation. Mitsubishi did not tender a replacement for the coupé.

=== Hatchback/coupé ===
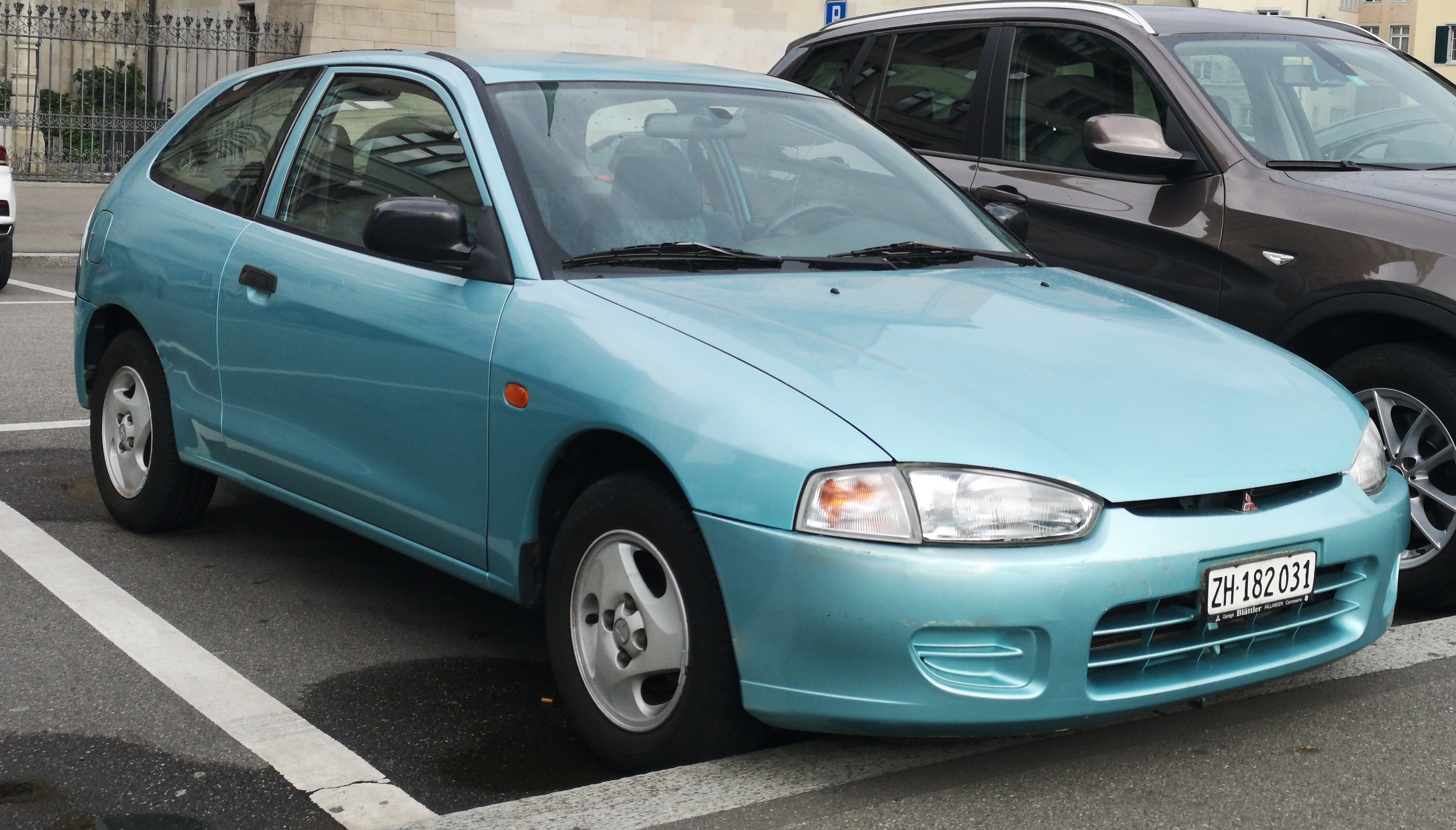
Colt hatchback (pre-facelift)

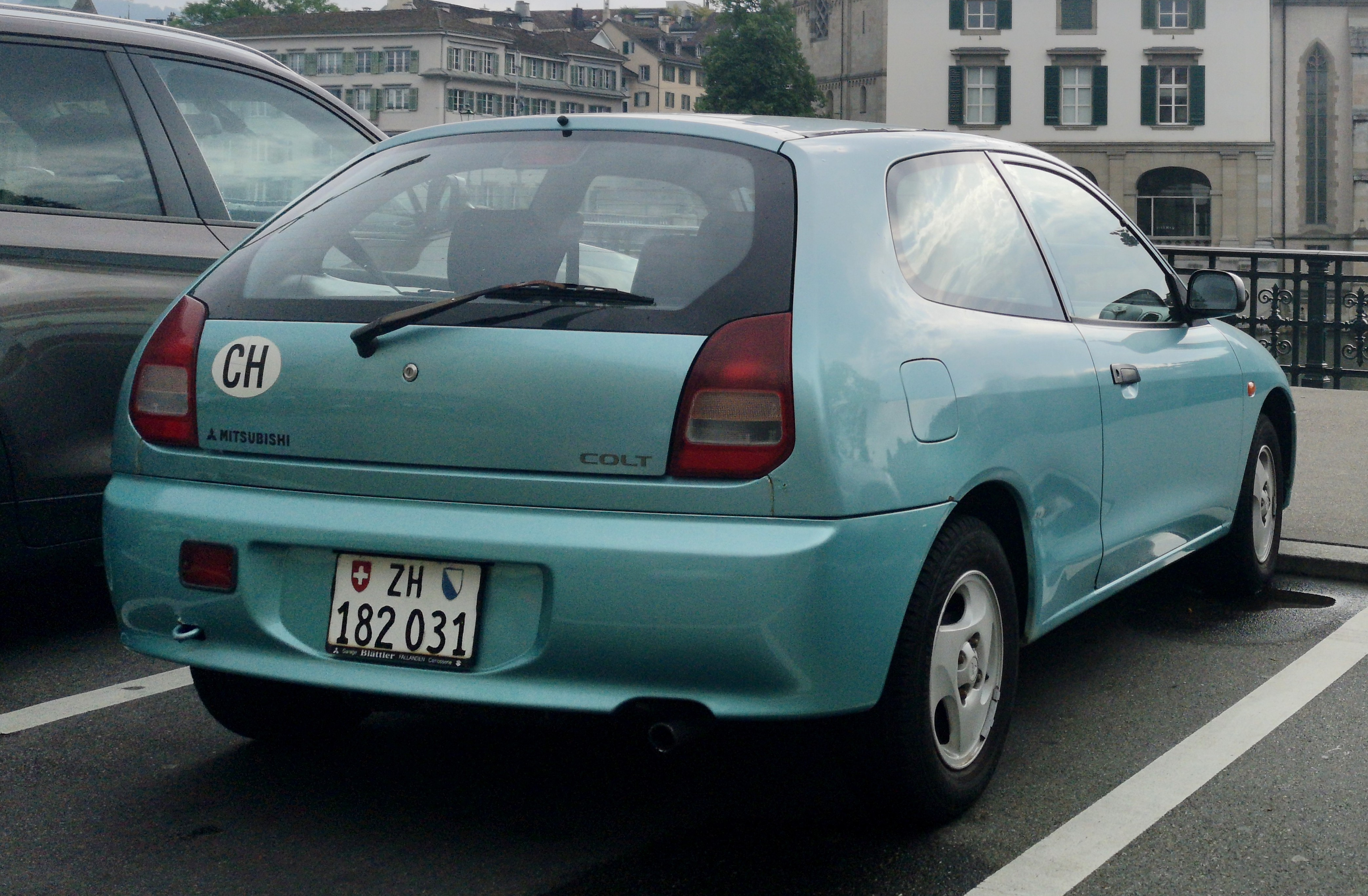
Rear view of Colt hatchback (pre-facelift)

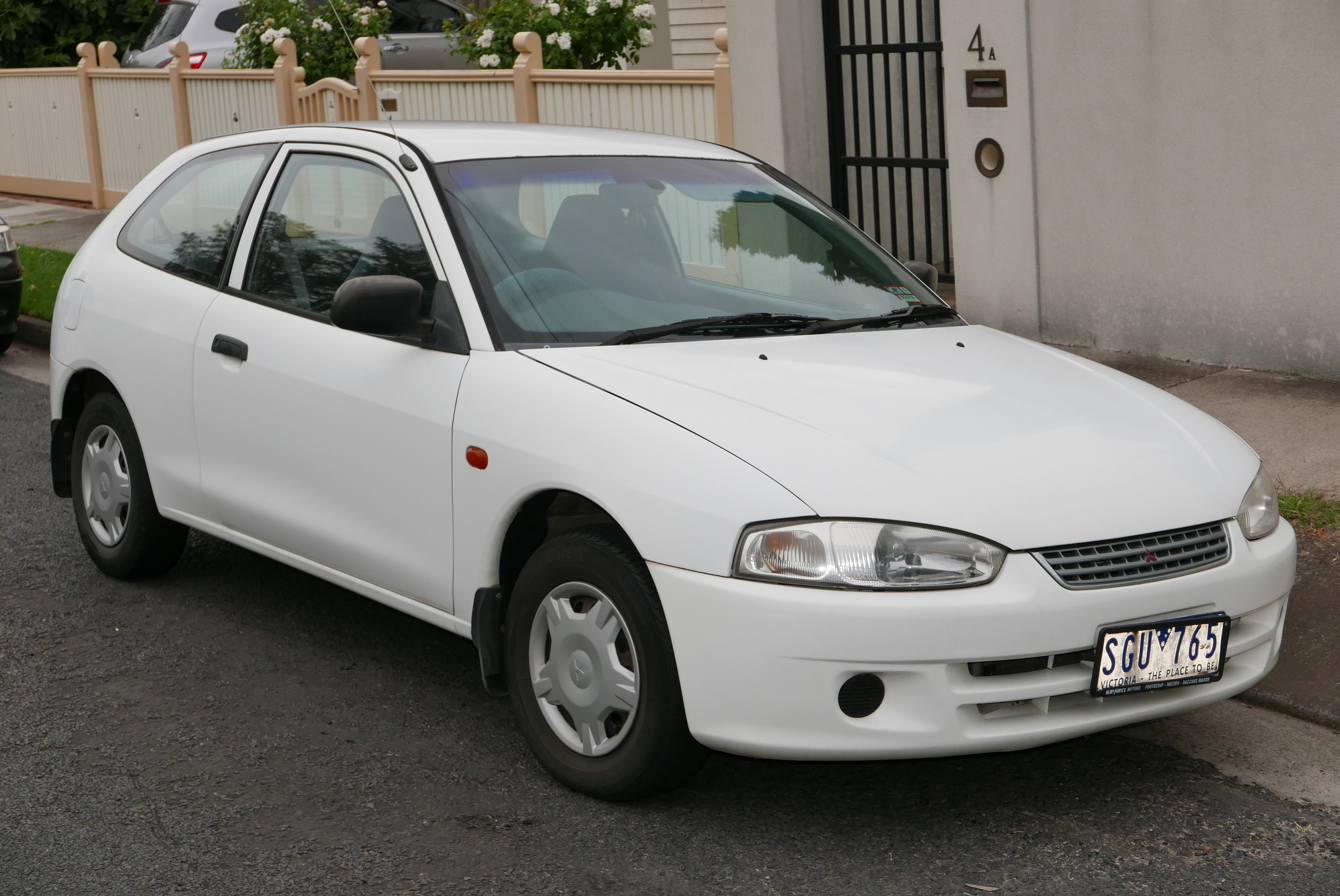
Mirage hatchback (facelift)

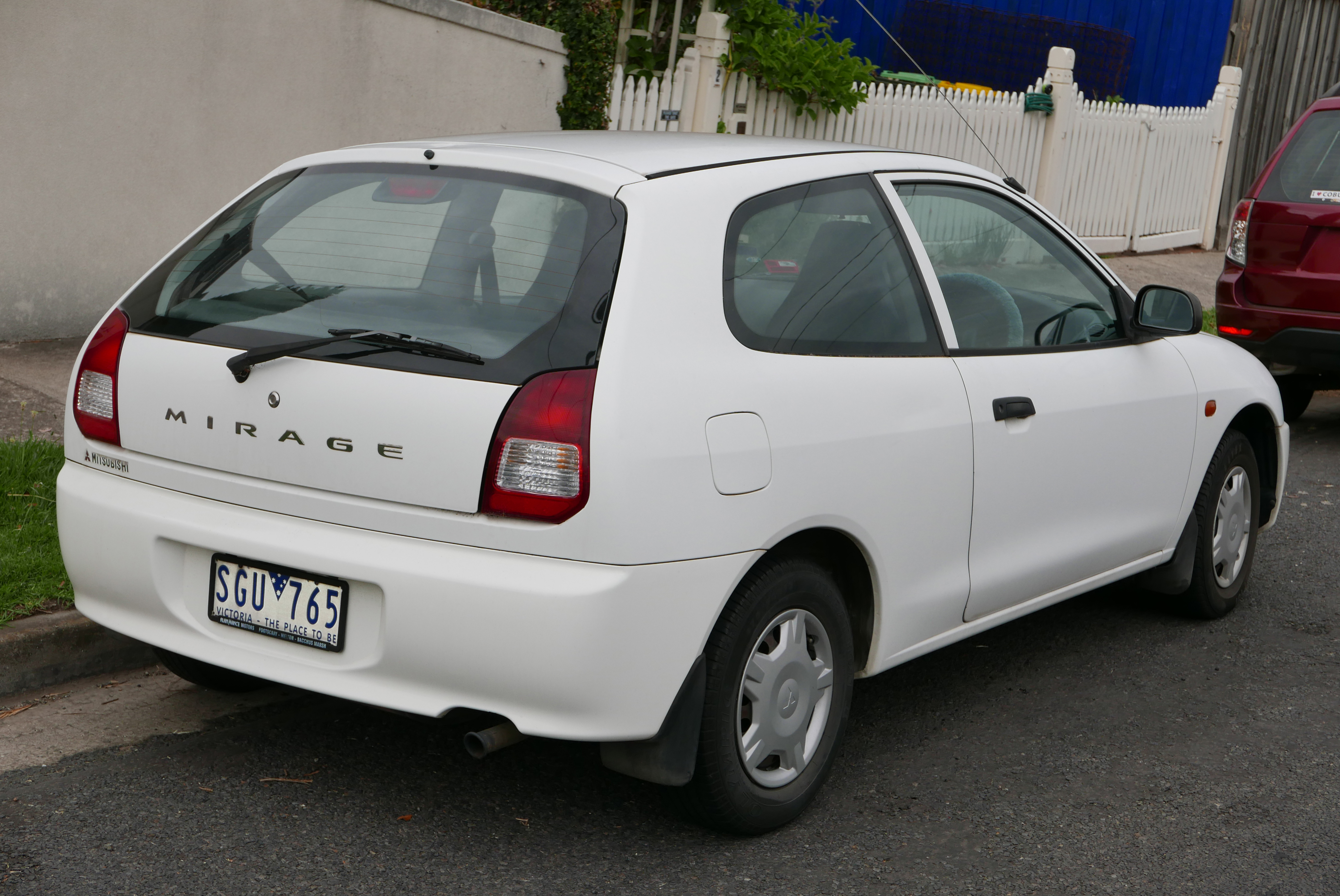
Rear view of Mirage hatchback (facelift)

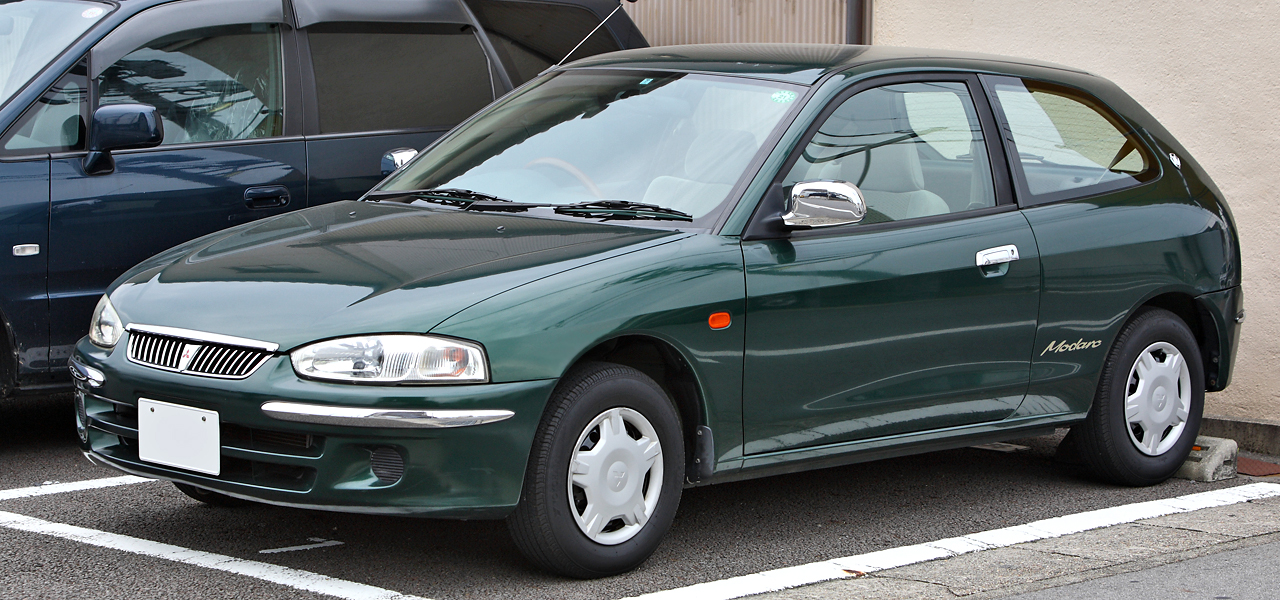
Mirage Modrac

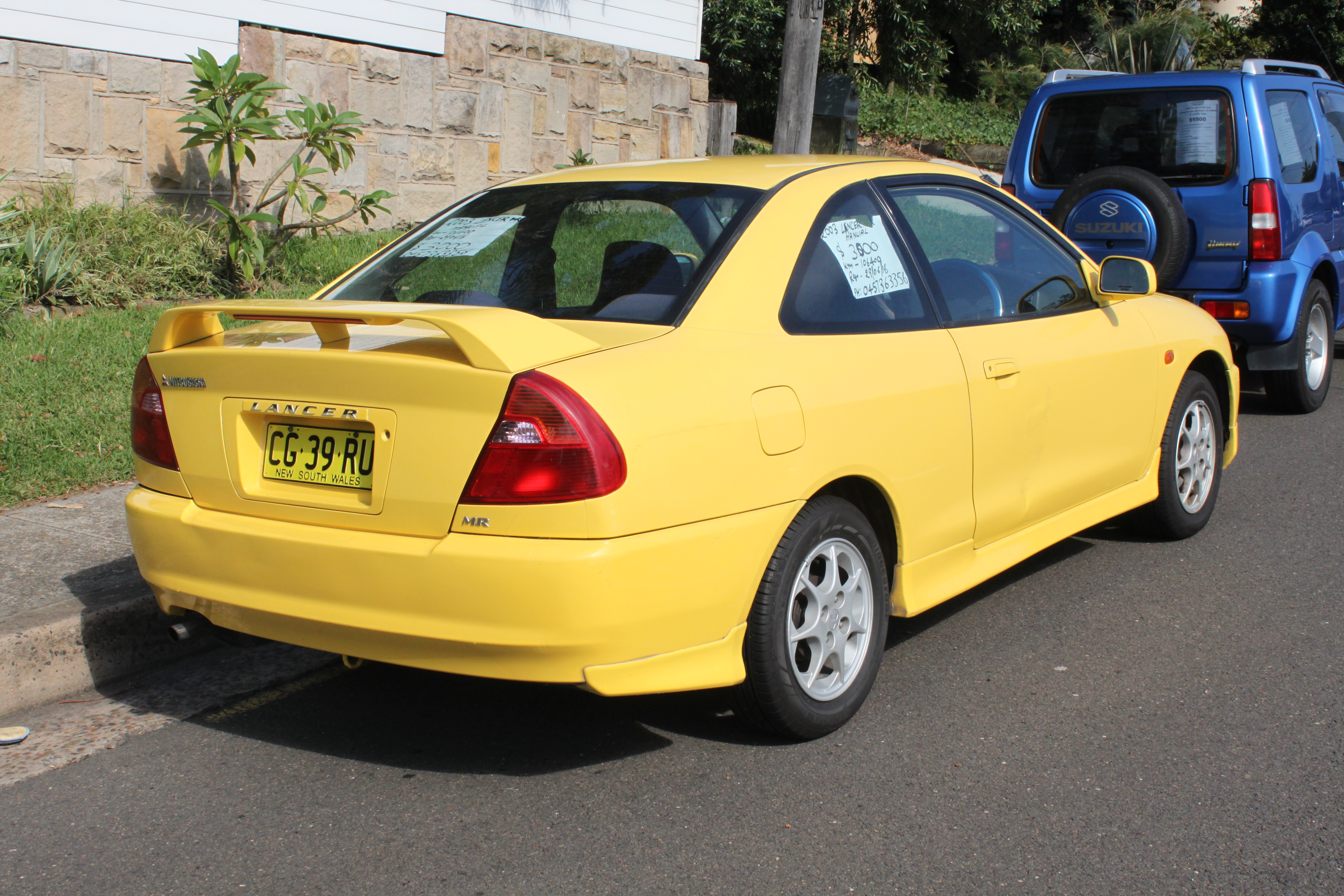
Rear view of Lancer coupé (facelift)

=== Sedan ===
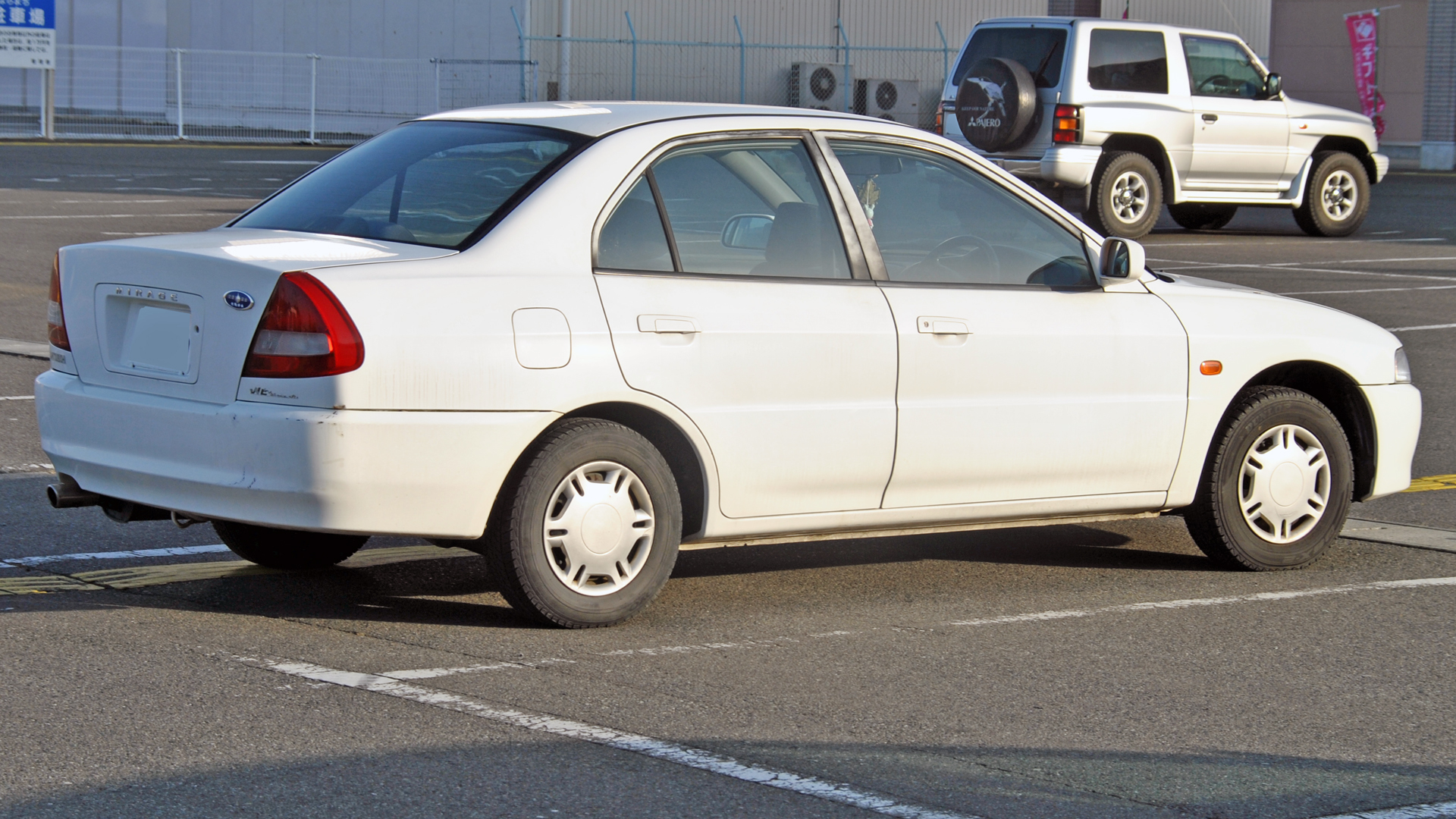
Rear view of Mirage sedan (pre-facelift)

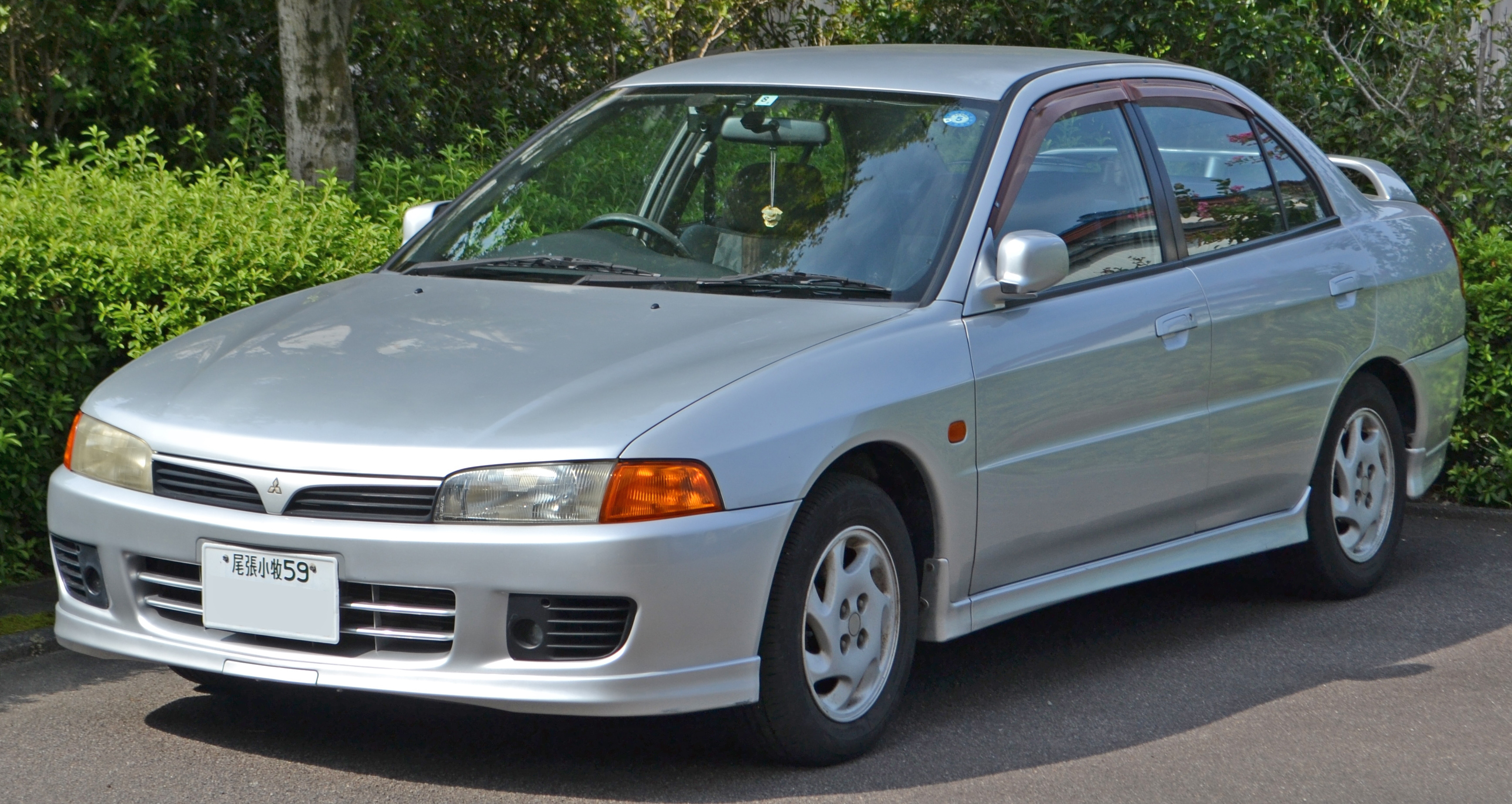
Lancer sedan (pre-facelift)

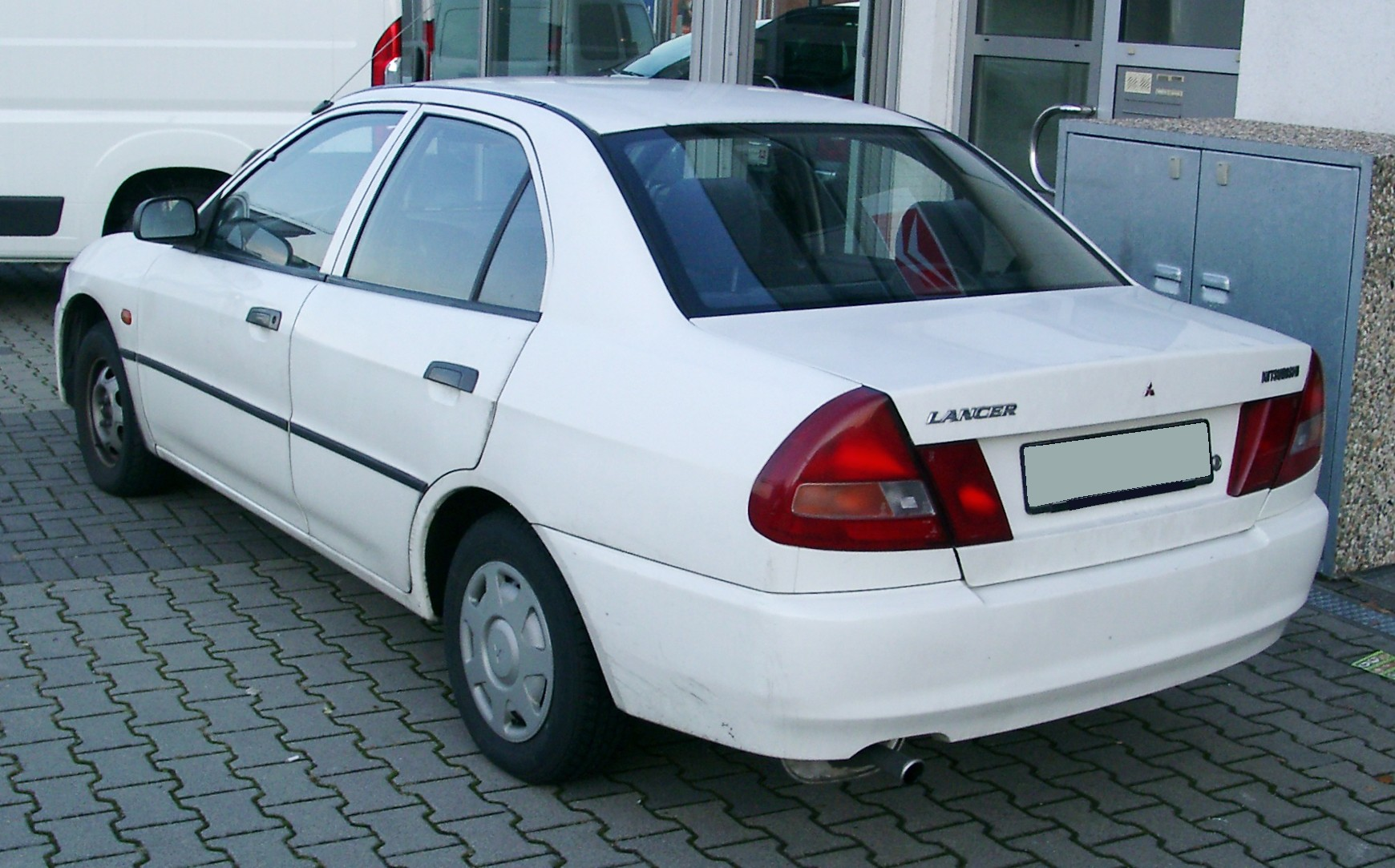
Rear view of Lancer sedan (pre-facelift)

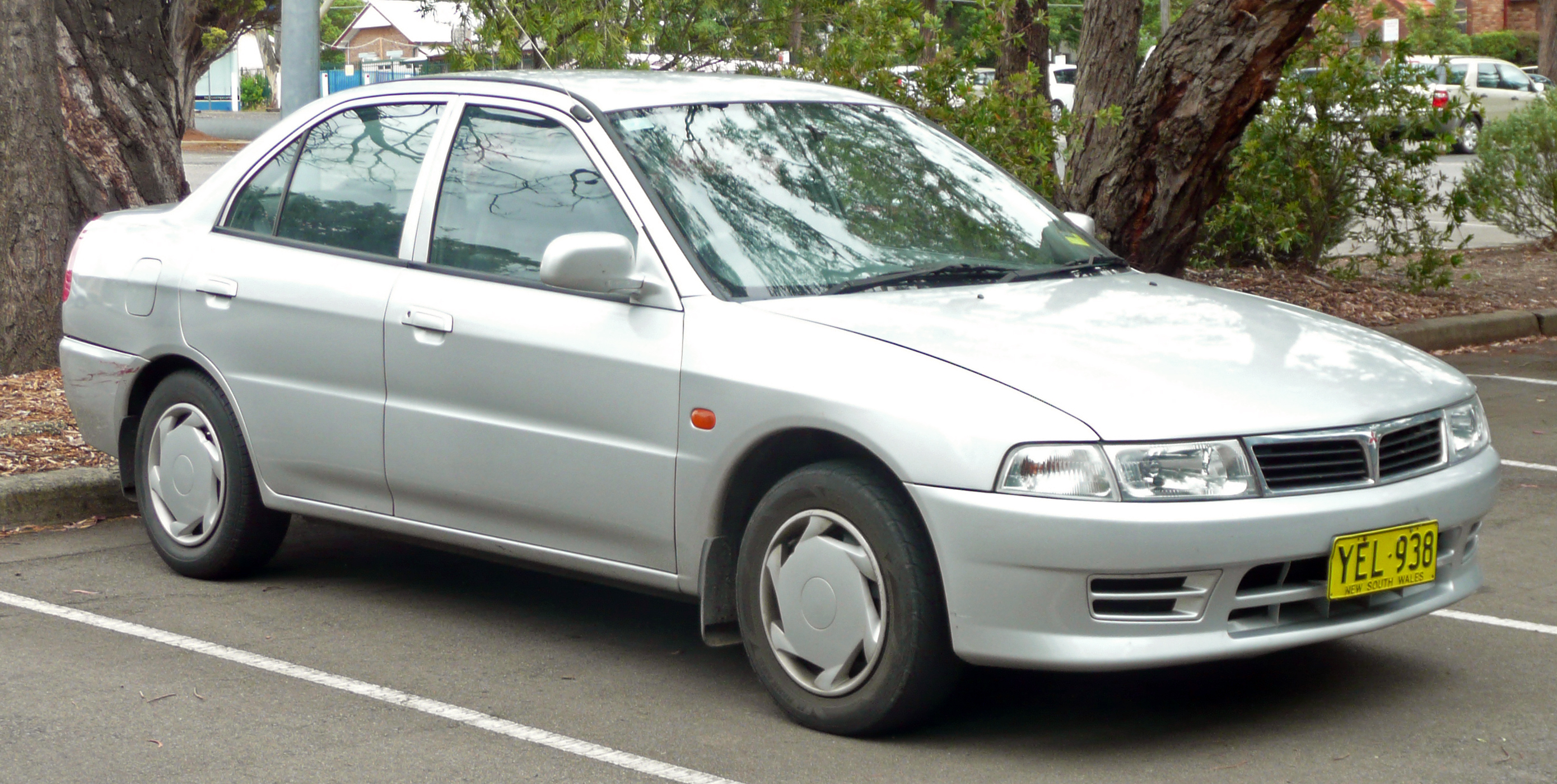
Lancer sedan (facelift)

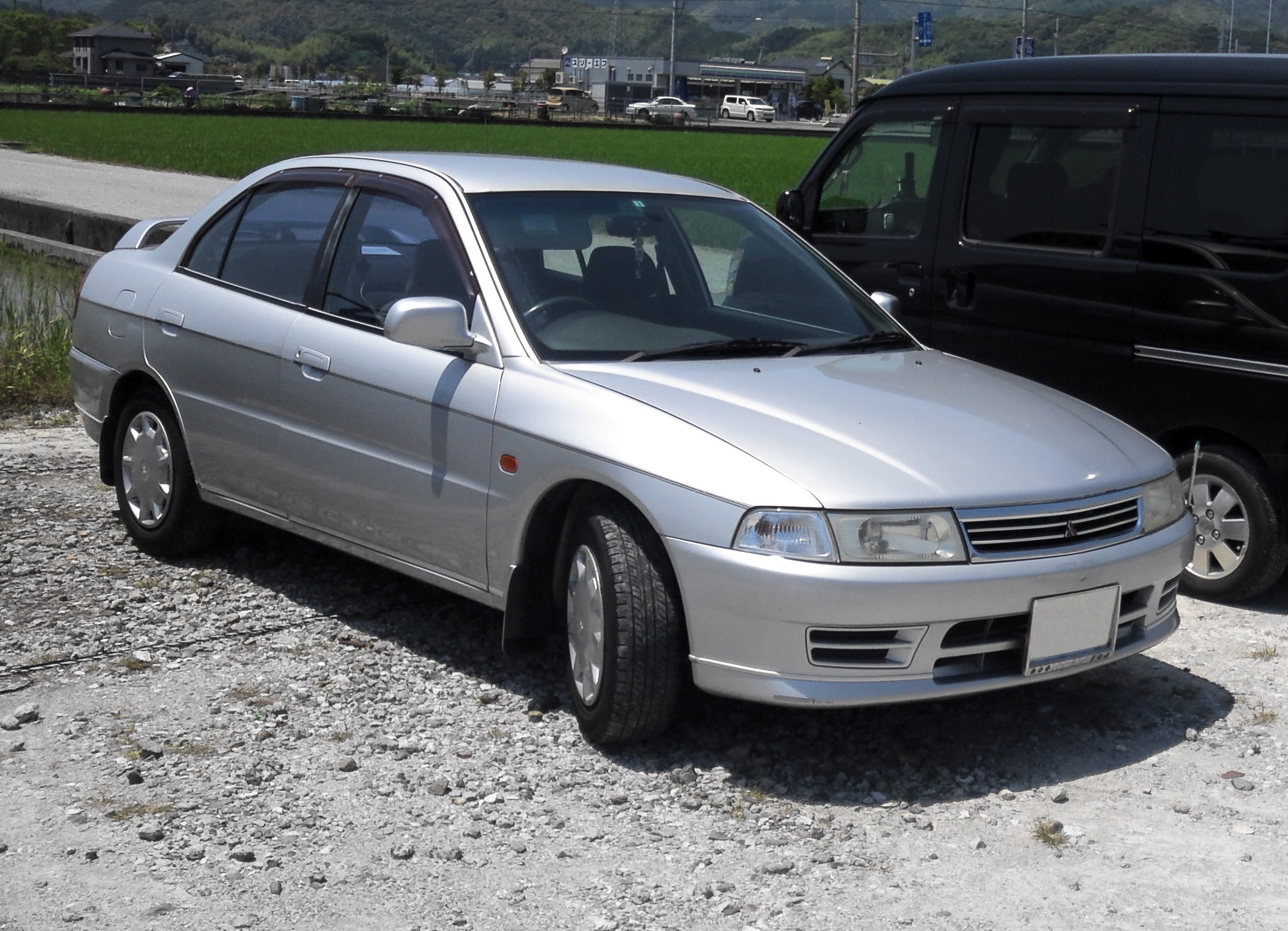
Mirage sedan (facelift)

=== Australia ===
This generation was sold in Australia between 1996 and 2003, designated the CE series. Like the previous generation, this model was available as a coupé and sedan (badged Lancer), and as the three-door titled Mirage. The Lancer wagon lingered on as a CE model, despite being a facelifted remnant of the previous generation. Towards the end of its model run, Mitsubishi introduced several limited editions (based on the GLi) to remain competitive with its rivals. These extras such as sports interiors, alloy wheels, and body kits. Despite the introduction of the new generation Lancer sedan to Australia in 2002, the CE continued alongside it until production ended in 2003, including the sedan which remained as the basic GLi. The coupé was now only available in GLi and MR trims.

=== United States ===
In the United States, the fifth generation Mirage arrived for the 1997 model year and was again available in sedan and coupé versions. The SOHC 1.5- and 1.8-liter engines from the previous iteration returned in DE and LS trims, respectively. The 1998 model year brought a stronger starter and battery; 1999 introduced a minor facelift, plainer seat fabric; and for the LS coupé, white-faced gauges and a tachometer with either transmission (it was formerly exclusive to the manual). For 2000, Mitsubishi added further standard equipment, plus the standardization of the 1.8-liter engine for the DE sedan; anti-lock brakes were deleted from the options list. Mitsubishi renamed the DE sedan as ES for model year 2001. Mirage sedans were replaced with the next generation Lancer for 2002, although the coupé lingered on for 2002 in North America. The production of the model year 1999 Mirage sedans was greatly lowered due to the large demand for the Eclipse; there were only 4,783 Mirage DE (Deluxe Edition) units produced and 3,829 Mirage sedans exported for that model year. In Puerto Rico, the 1.8-liter Mirage was sold as the Mirage Technica for both coupé and sedan variants.

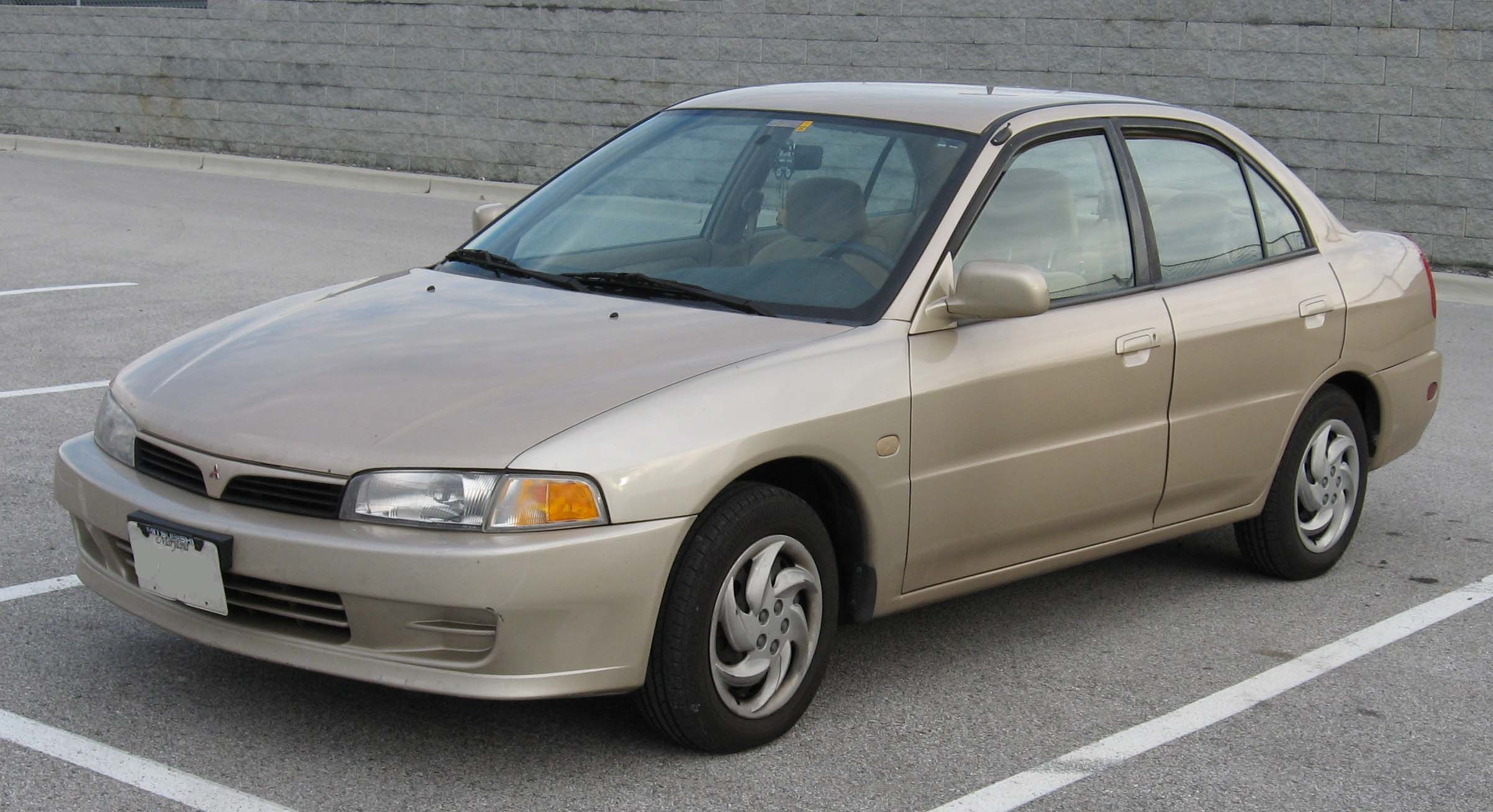
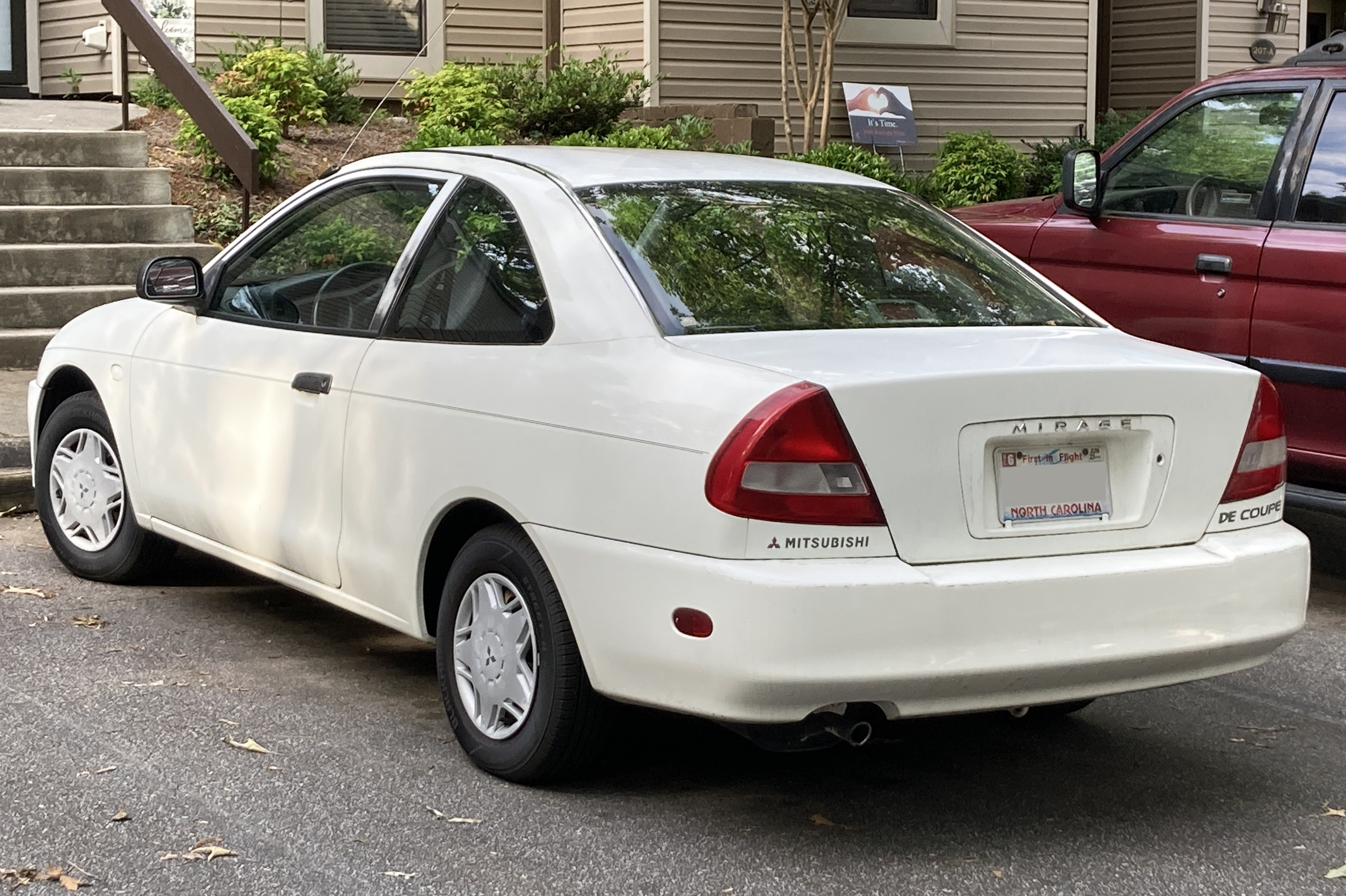
US-market Mirage sedan and coupé

=== Europe ===
As before, the European market Mirage hatchback of this generation was sold as the Colt between 1996 and 2001, powered by either 1.3- or 1.6-liter engines. On the other hand, the Lancer sedan was marketed in limited markets (such as in Germany, Ireland, Greece and the Netherlands) and only fitted with a 1.3-liter engine, positioned below the mid-size Carisma. In 1999, the limited edition of Colt hatchback gained a chrome-trimmed grille insert from the Japanese-market Mirage Modrac.

=== Venezuela ===
Venezuela received this series in 1998 as a Lancer where it remained until 2001. After this, the next generation Lancer entered the market and local production of the old sedan recommenced between 2003 and 2010 under the Mitsubishi Signo name. Variants of the Signo comprise the base 1.3-liter GLi, and the 1.6-liter "Plus" and "Taxi" trims.

=== Taiwan ===
It entered the Taiwanese market in November 1996, produced locally by China Motor Corporation (CMC), and was based on the US-market model like the previous generation. The sedan was split into two models: the basic Lancer with a 1.6-liter engine, and an upmarket model with a 1.8-liter DOHC engine called the Lancer Virage. In 1998, the sedan received a facelift with a more luxurious appearance – this version was also adopted for the facelifted model in select Asian countries, while the Lancer Virage was rebranded simply as the Mitsubishi Virage. A sporty model called the Virage iO was introduced shortly after; it featured a new grille from the international market Lancer, smoked headlights and black leather interior. The production of this Lancer/Virage lasted until December 2000.

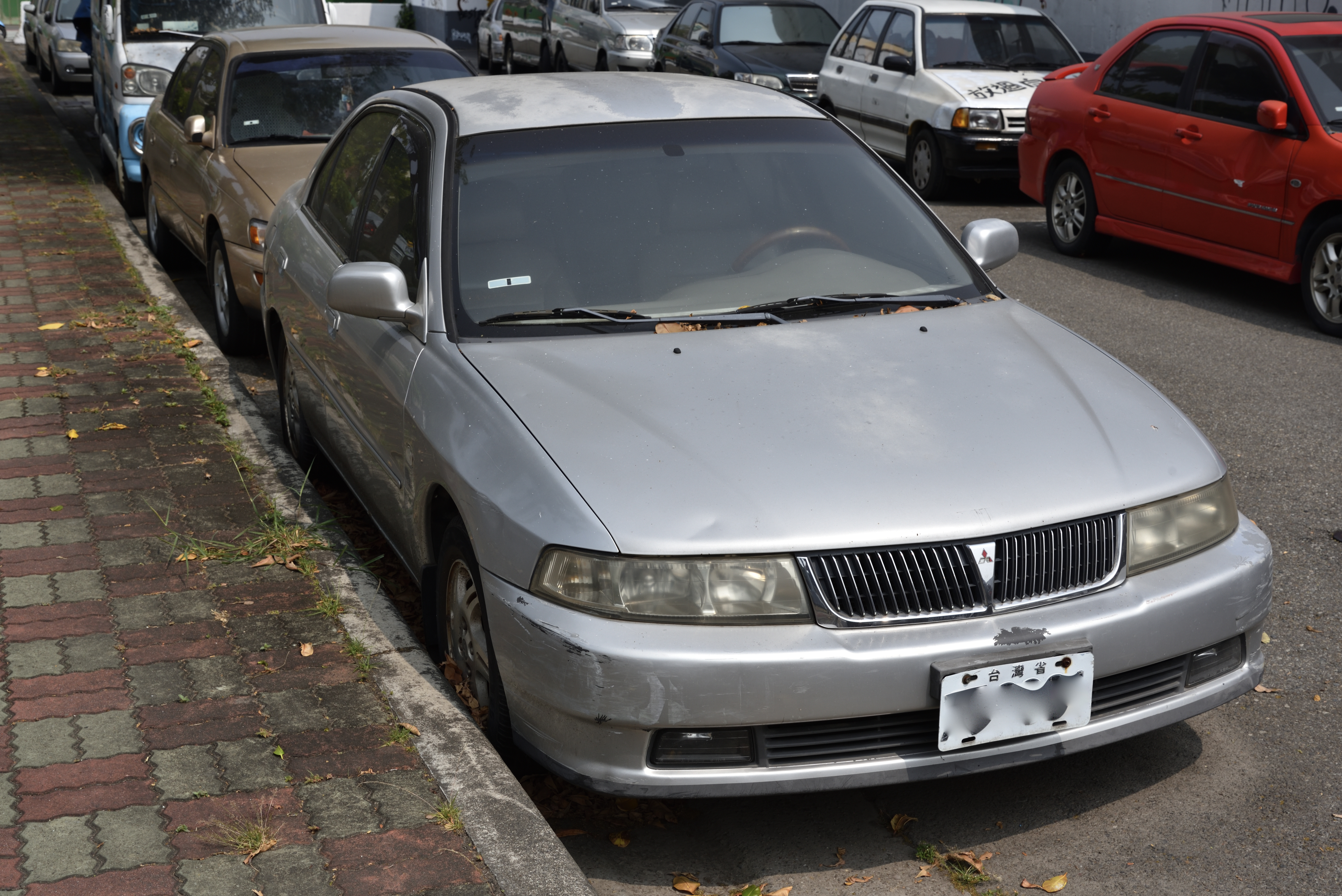
Taiwanese-market Lancer (facelift)

=== China ===
This generation Lancer entered the Chinese market first as the Soueast Lioncel in March 2003 and was produced by Soueast Motors – a joint venture between Taiwan's CMC and China's Fujian Motor Industry Group. The first model was based on the 1998 Virage but featured different taillights and later facelifted in 2004 based on the sportier Virage iO. The Lioncel was sold in China up to 2005, but extended up to 2008 with another facelift for export markets. Unlike in Taiwan, the only engine offered in China was a 1.6-liter unit, although the engine (4G18) was adopted from the next generation Lancer.

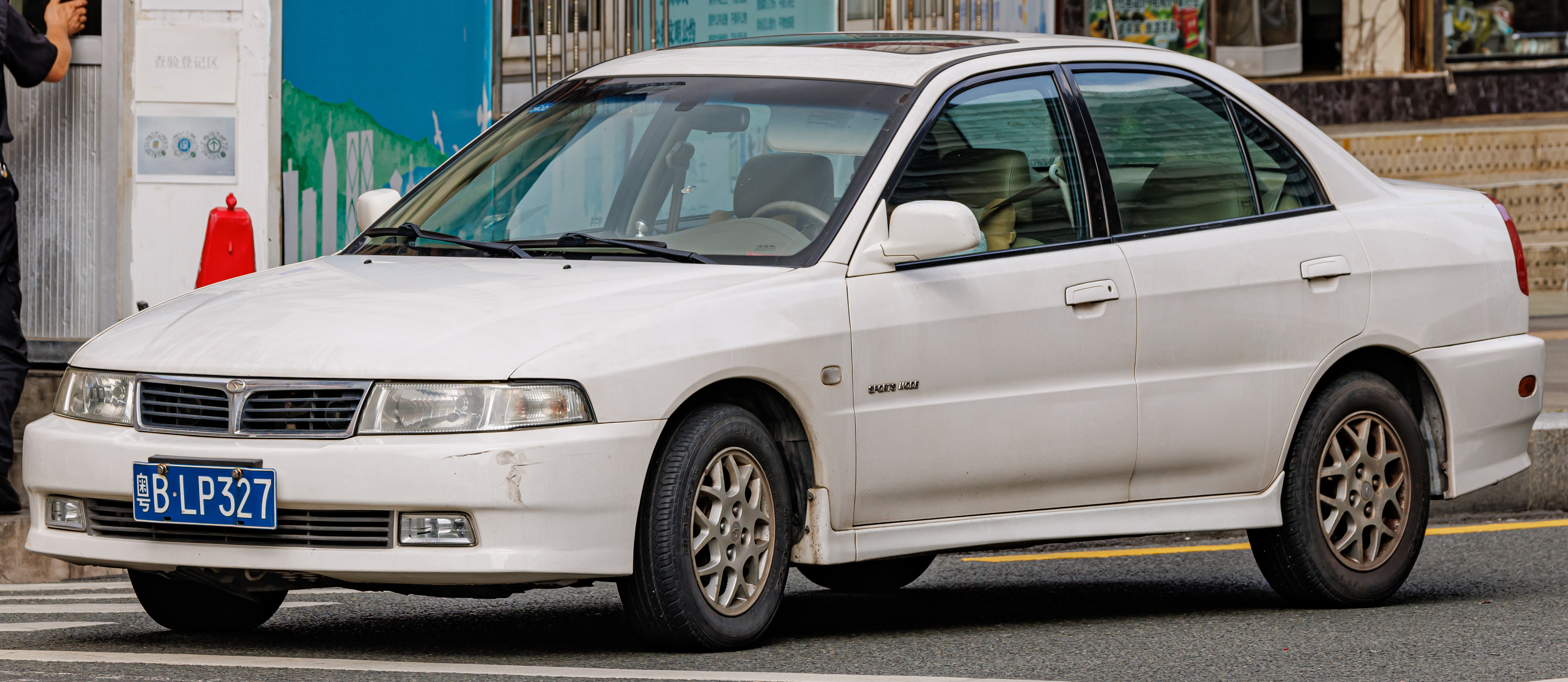
Soueast Lioncel (first facelift)

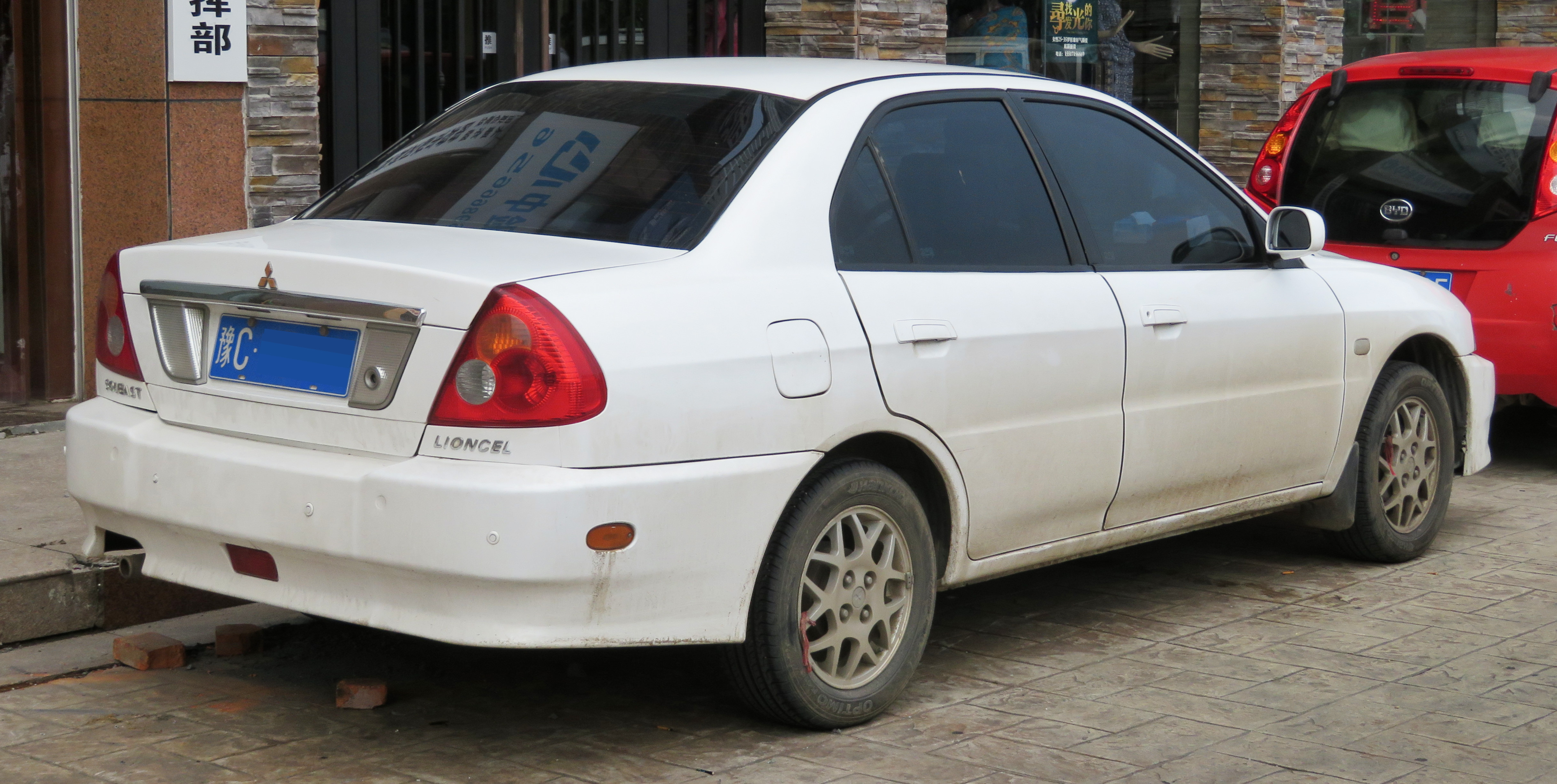
Rear view of Soueast Lioncel (pre-facelift)

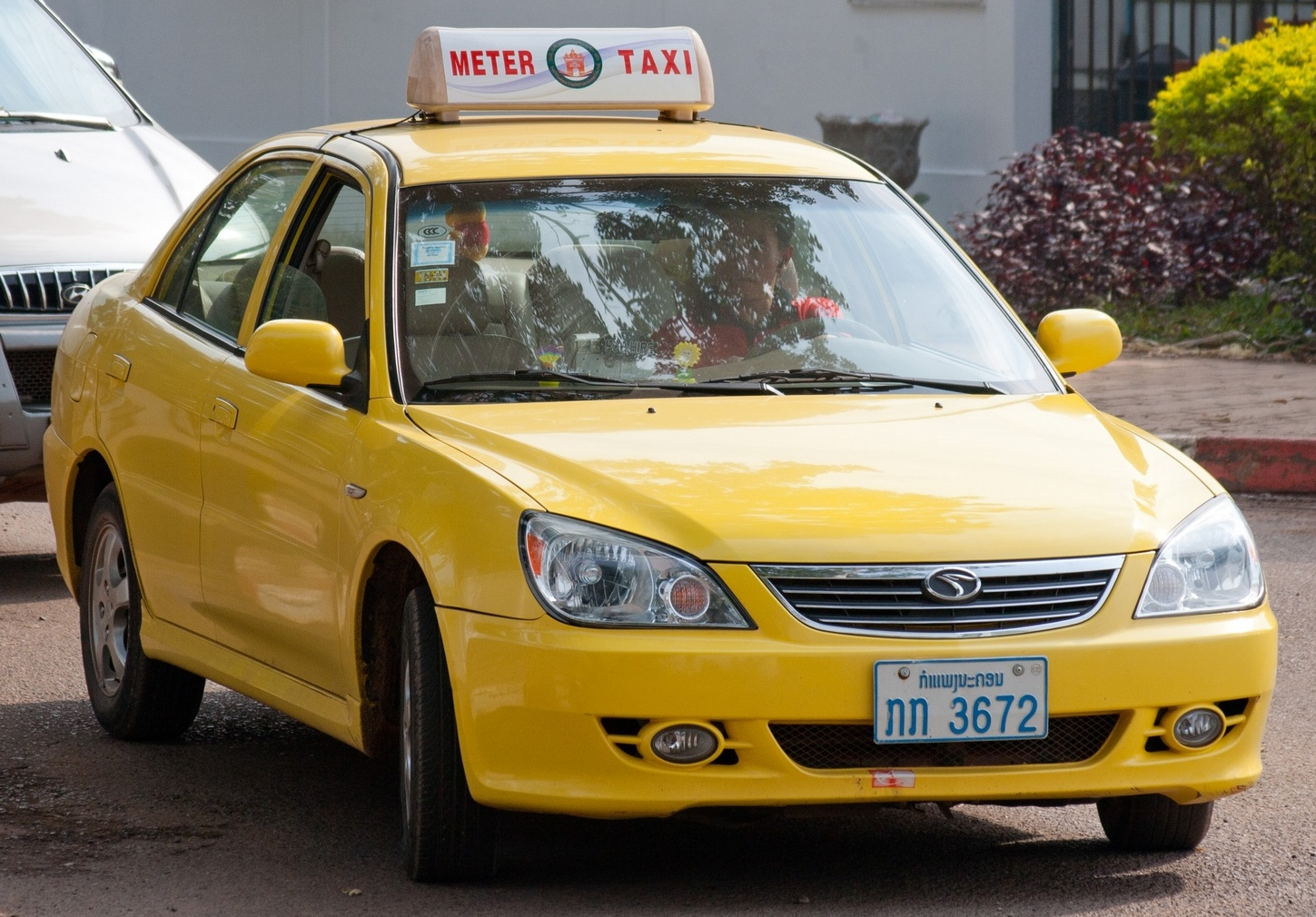
Export market Soueast Lioncel (second facelift)

In 2006, Mitsubishi invested directly in Soueast and began selling the Lioncel as the Lancer in China. The Lancer continued to be produced by the manufacturer with slightly different exterior styling based on the second facelift export only Lioncel and 2003 facelift next generation Lancer. The engine, 5-speed manual and 4-speed automatic transmissions, and trims levels were also retrained. The Lancer received its facelift in 2012, and based on the 2005 facelift next generation Lancer. The Lancer was discontinued in 2015, and briefly sold alongside the Lancer Fortis and EX as an cheaper alternative.

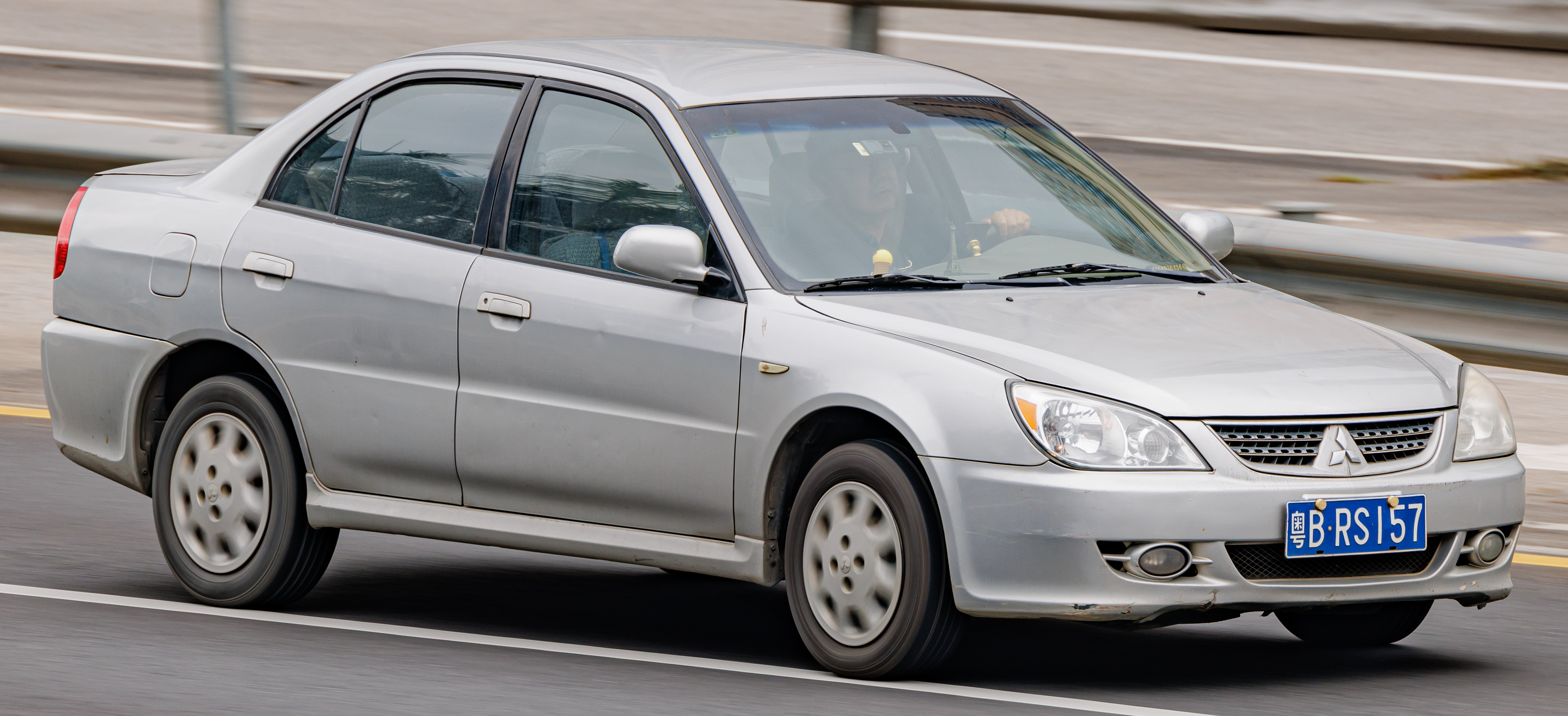
Chinese-market Lancer (pre-facelift)

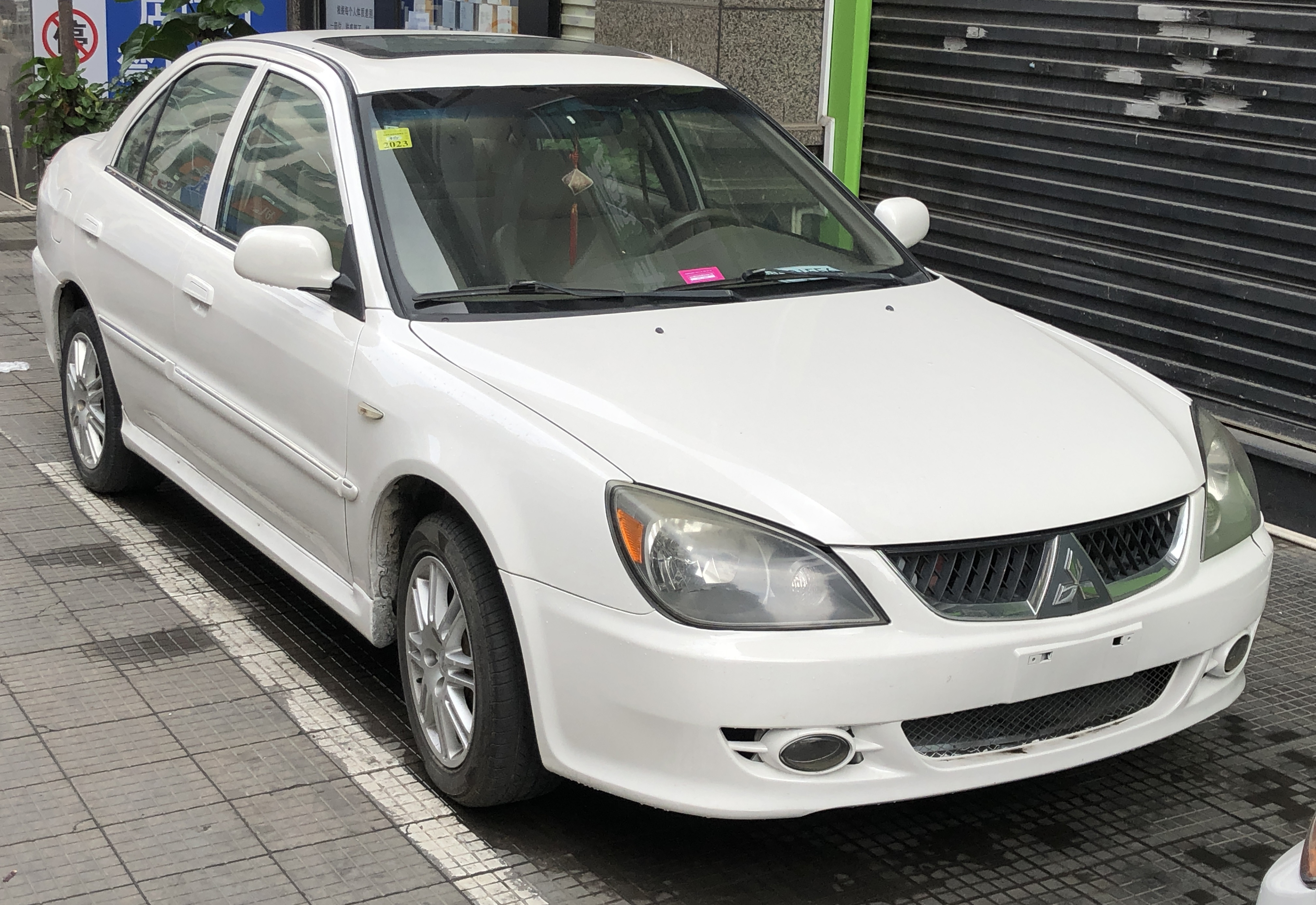
Chinese-market Lancer Sport (pre-facelift)

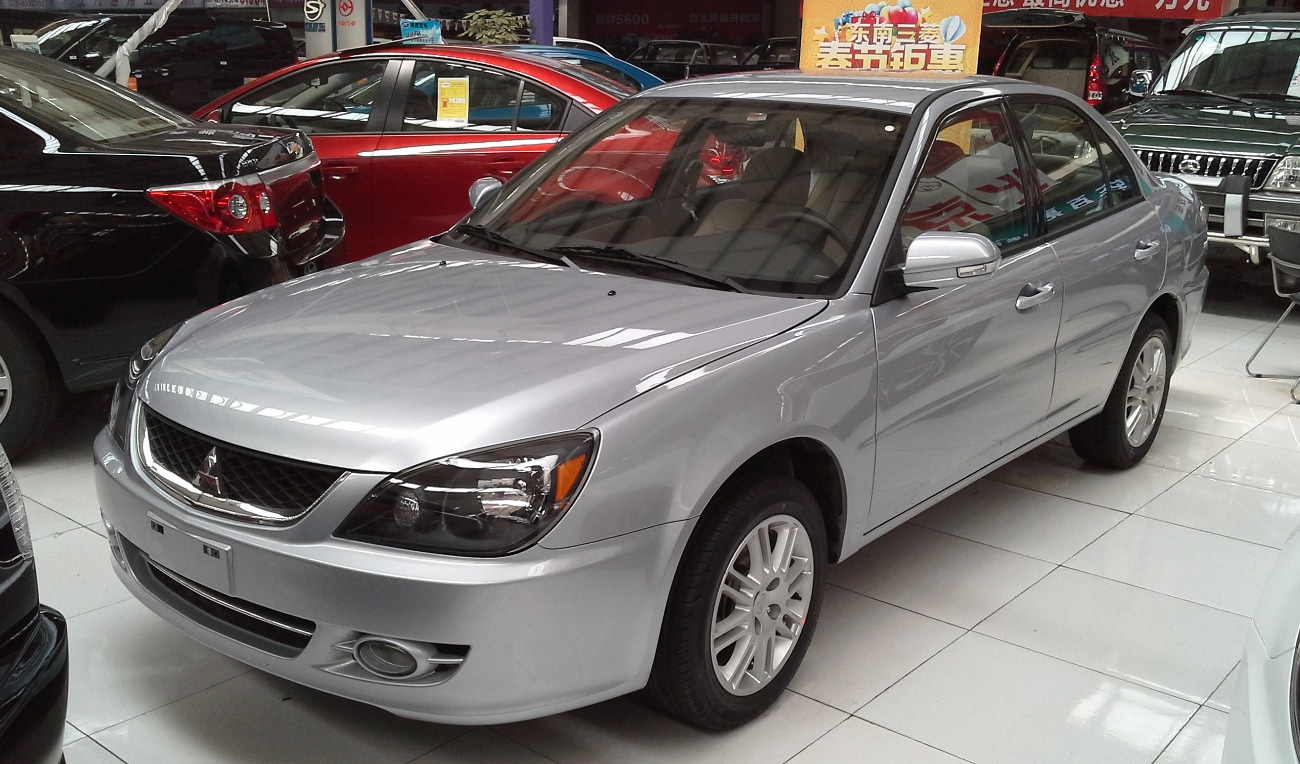
Chinese-market Lancer (facelift)

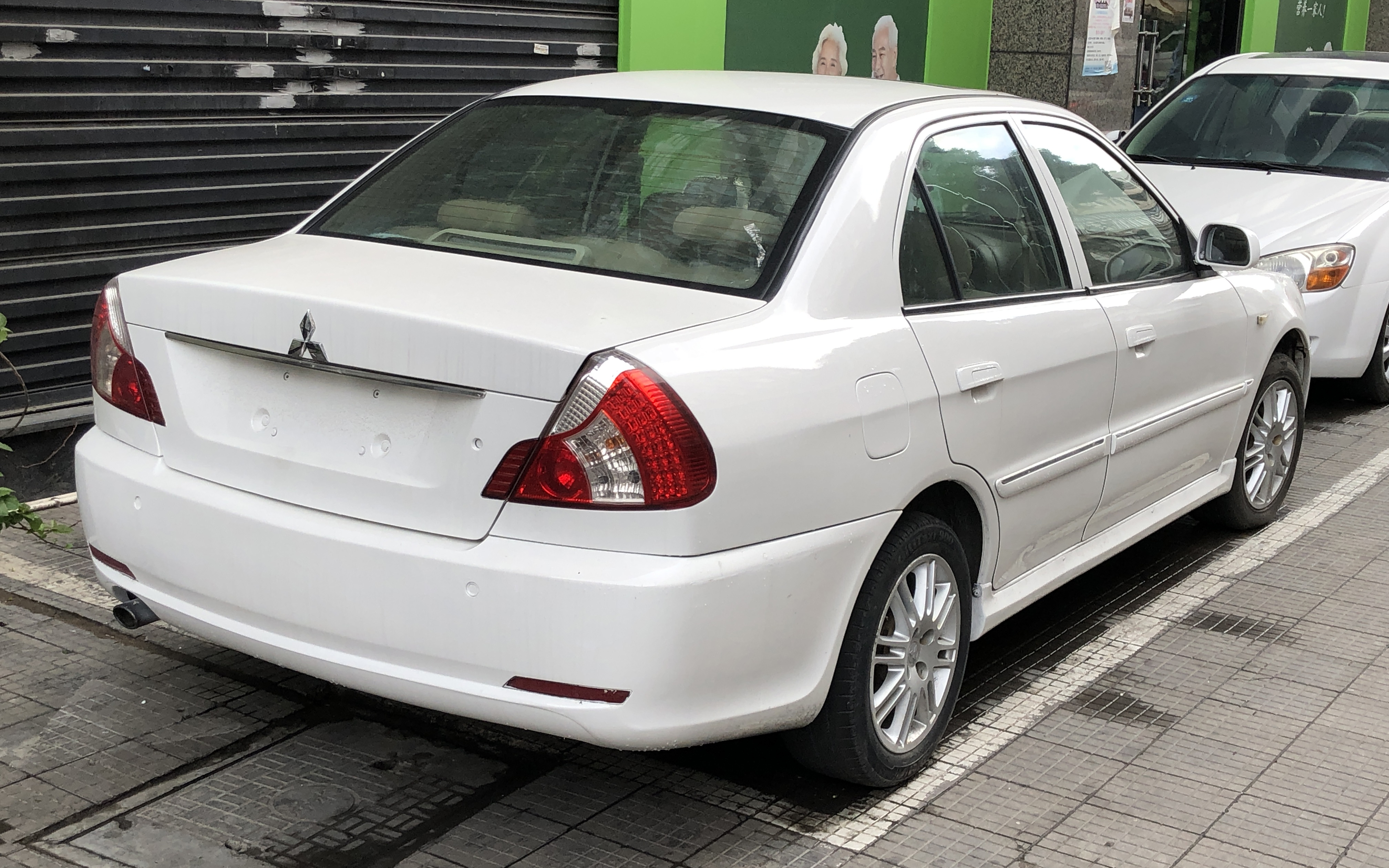
Rear view of Chinese-market Lancer

Another variant called the Soueast V3 Lingyue is a facelifted version of the Lancer and successor to the Lioncel and was produced by Soueast from 2008 to 2019. To keep it competitive in the market, it was facelifted multiple times in 2010, 2012, 2013, and 2014. The V3 Lingyue initially used the 1.5-litre 4G15 DOHC MIVEC engine for the 2008 model year only. For 2009 models onwards, it was replaced by the 1.5-litre 4A91 engine. The V3 Lingyue comes with a 5-speed manual gearbox as standard and a CVT option was available from 2010 to 2014. The CVT was replaced by a 6-speed AMT in 2015, but later removed in 2017.

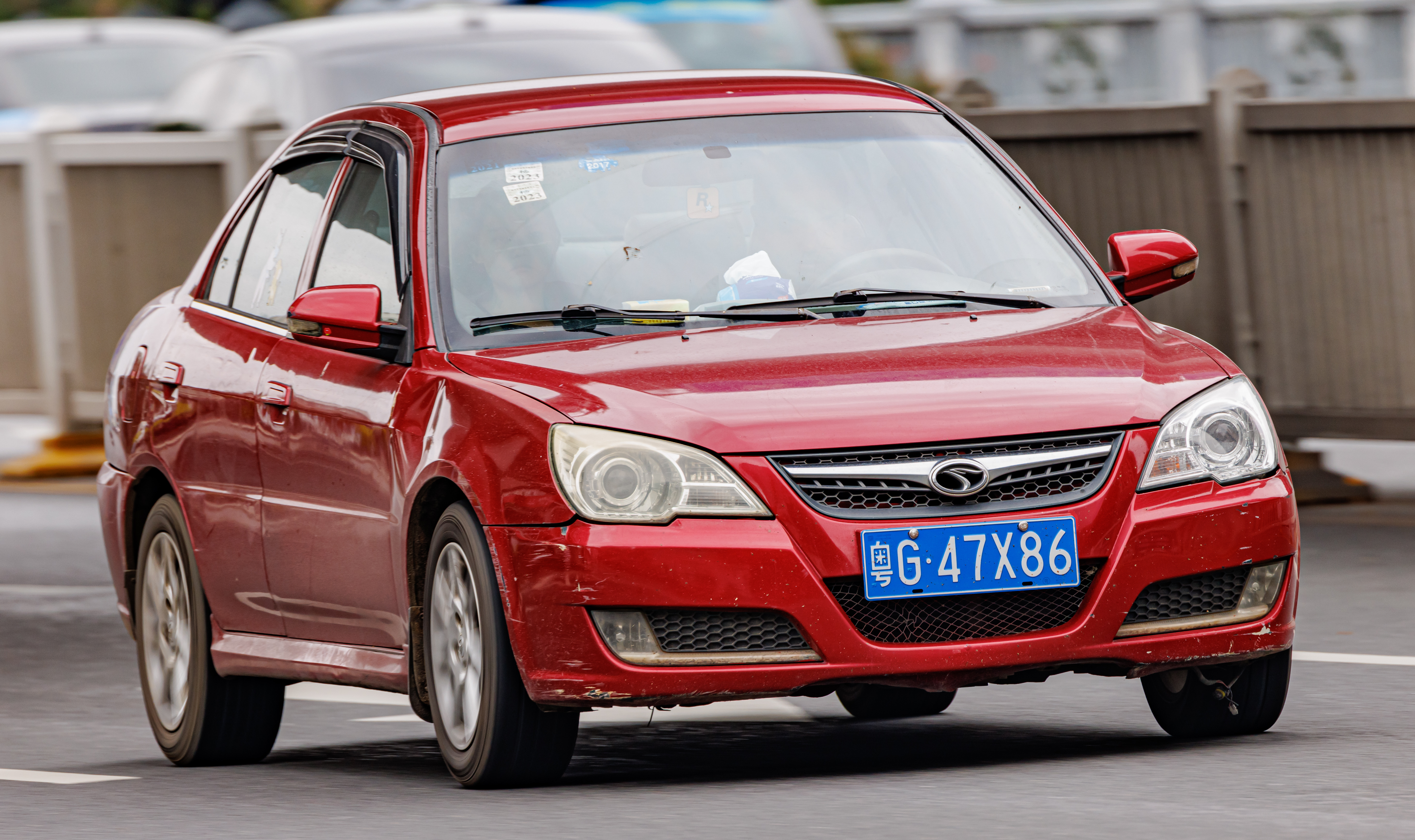
Soueast V3 Lingyue (pre-facelift)

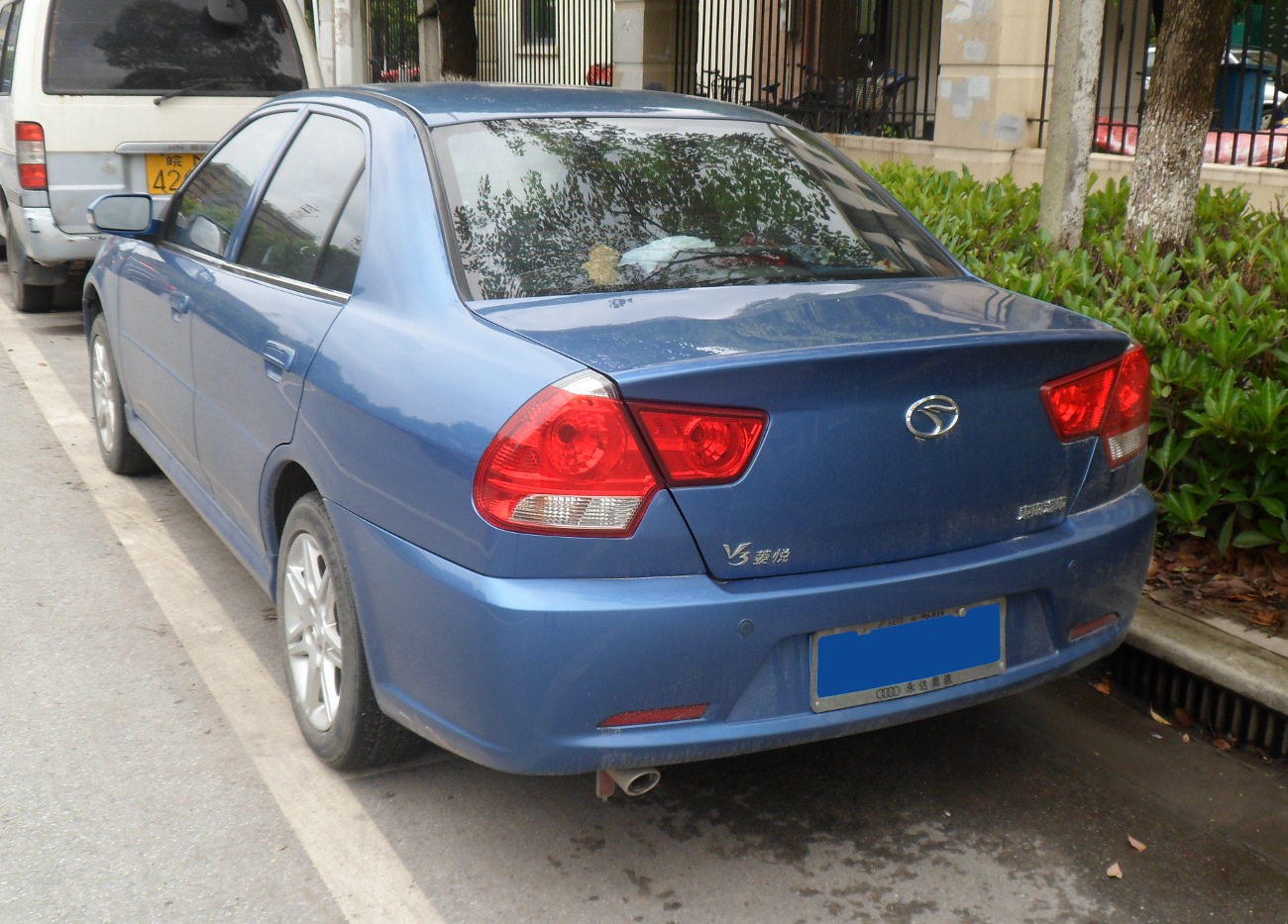
Soueast V3 Lingyue (pre-facelift)

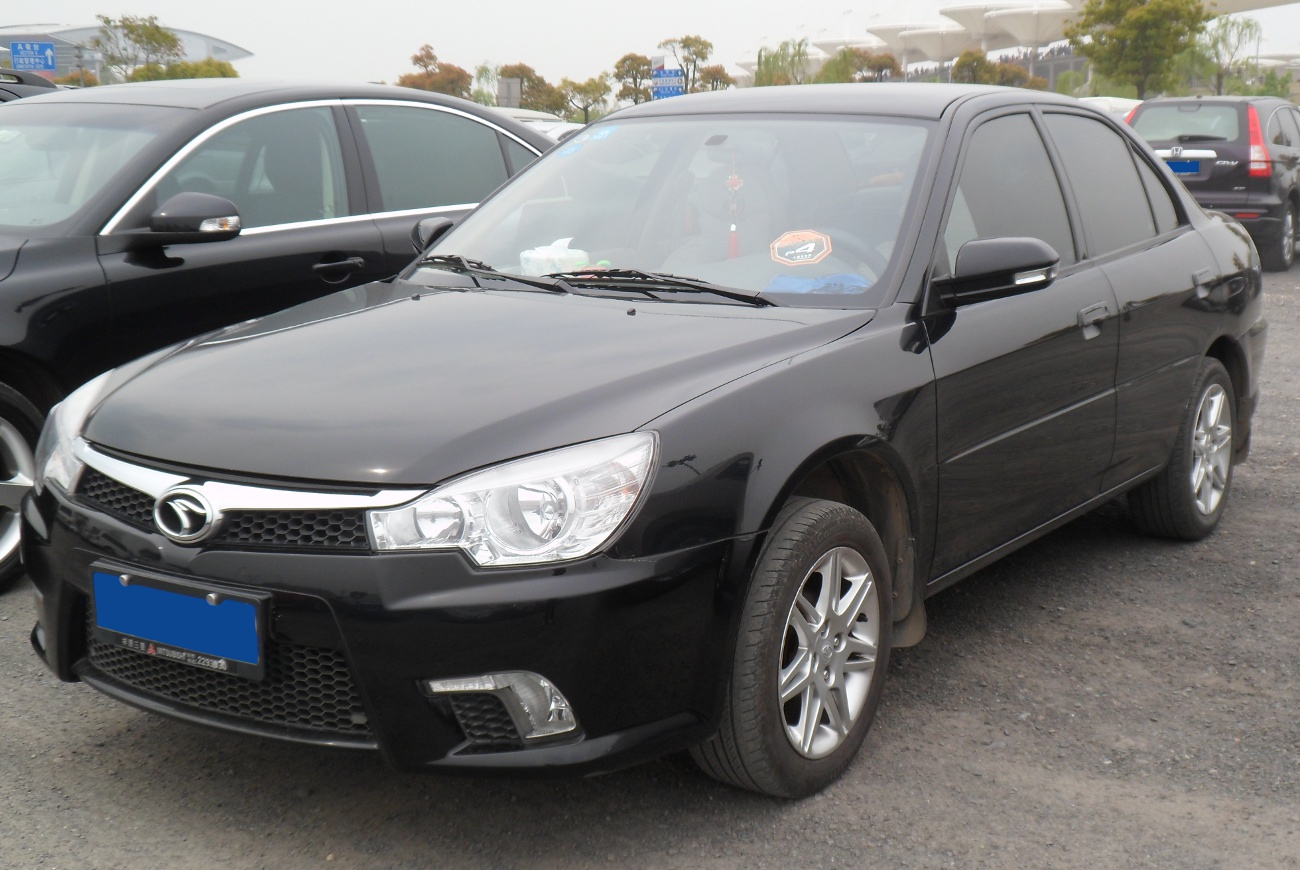
Soueast V3 Lingyue (first facelift)

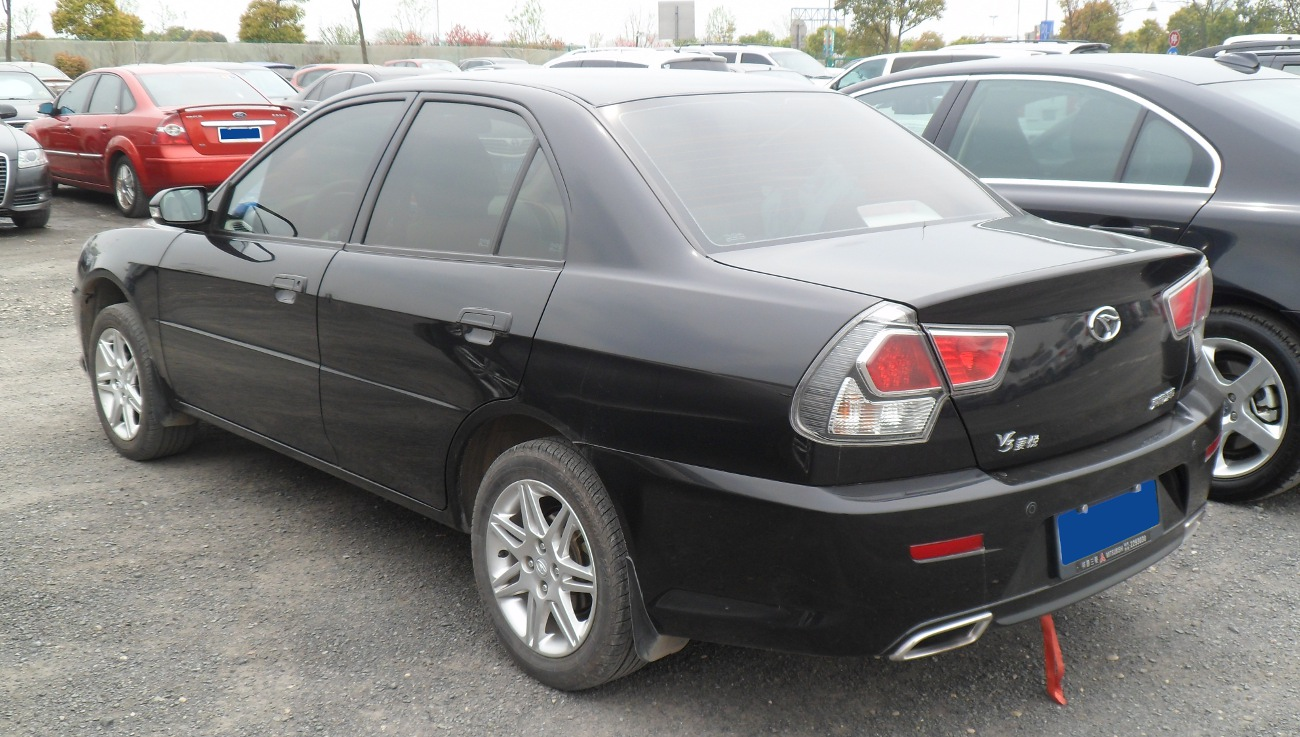
Soueast V3 Lingyue (first facelift)

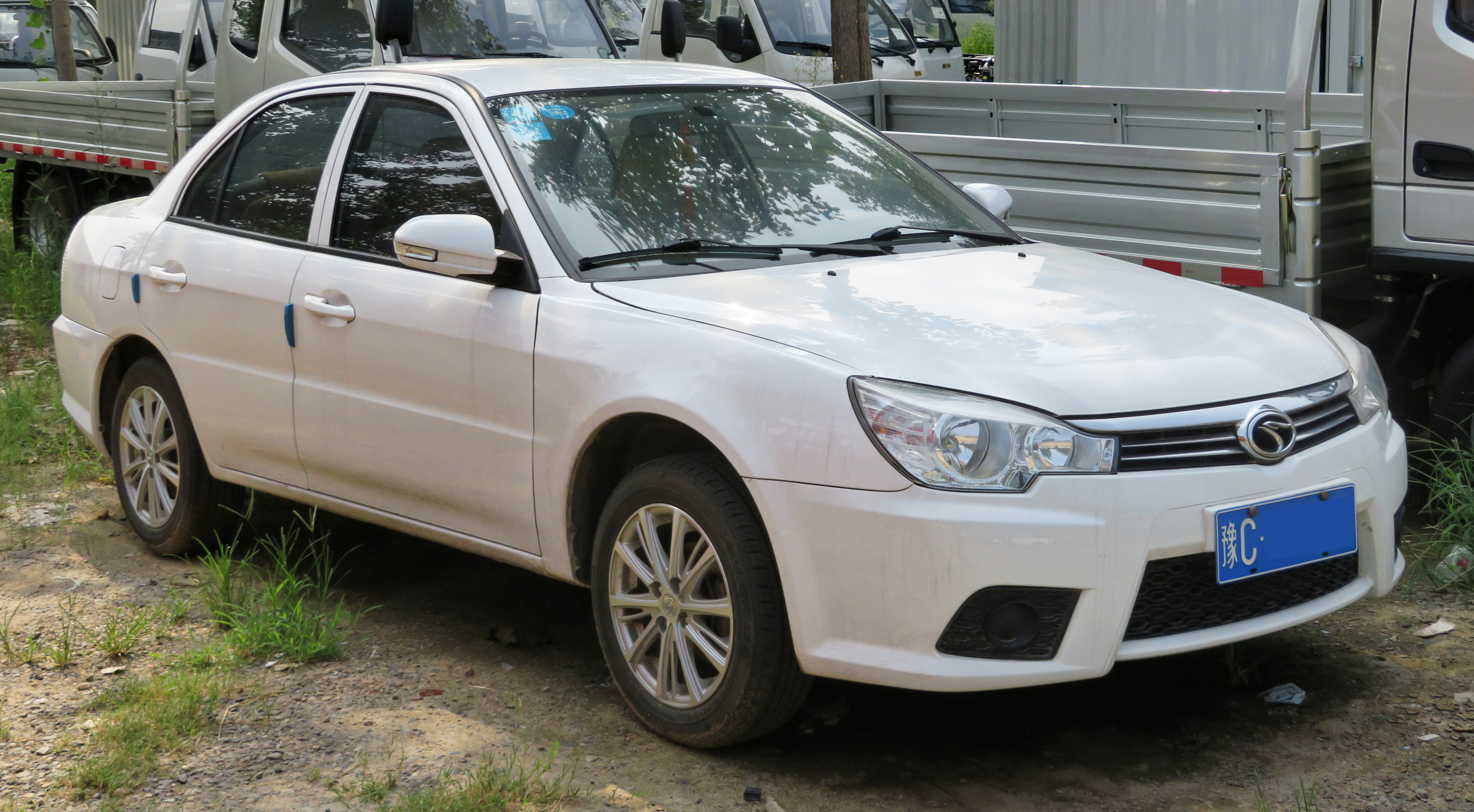
Soueast V3 Lingyue (second facelift)

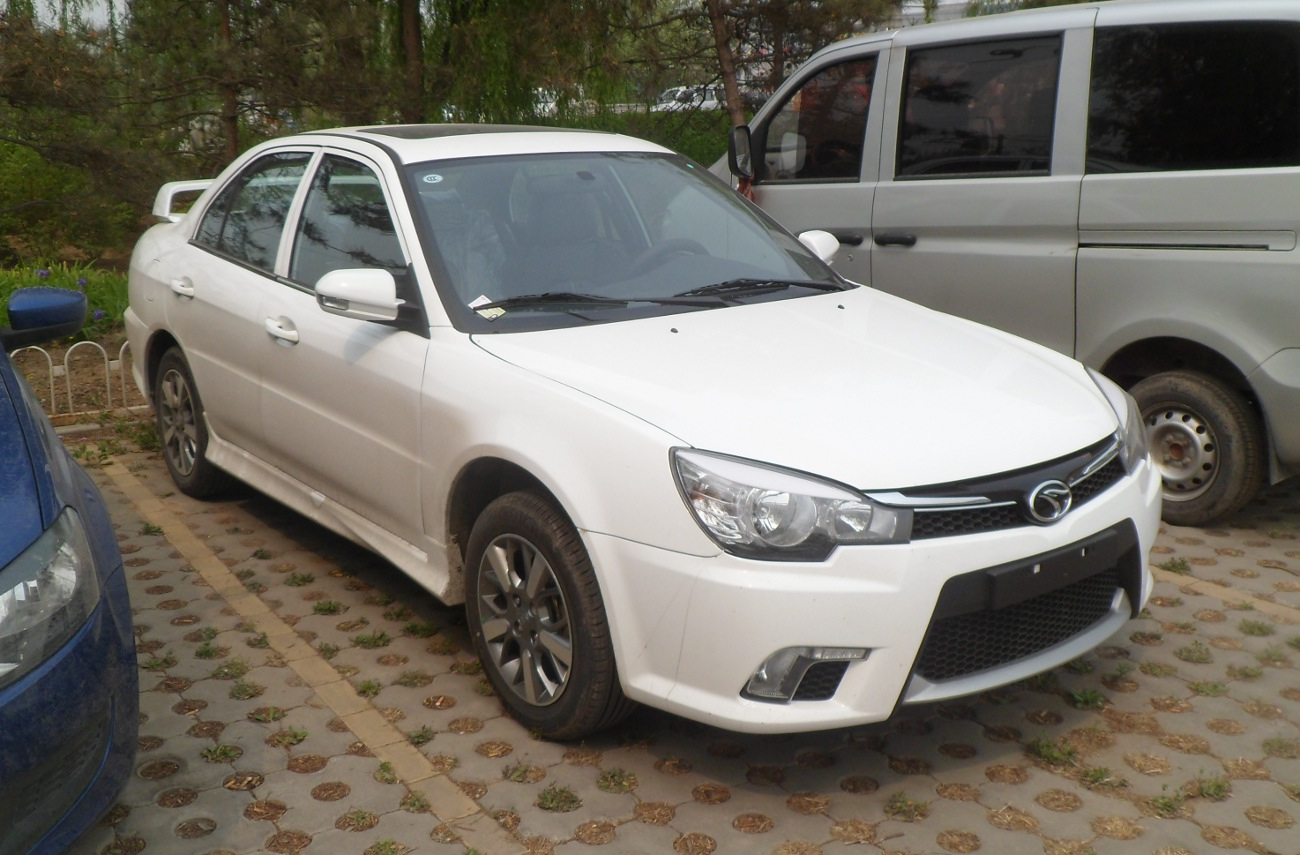
Soueast V3 Lingyue (third facelift)

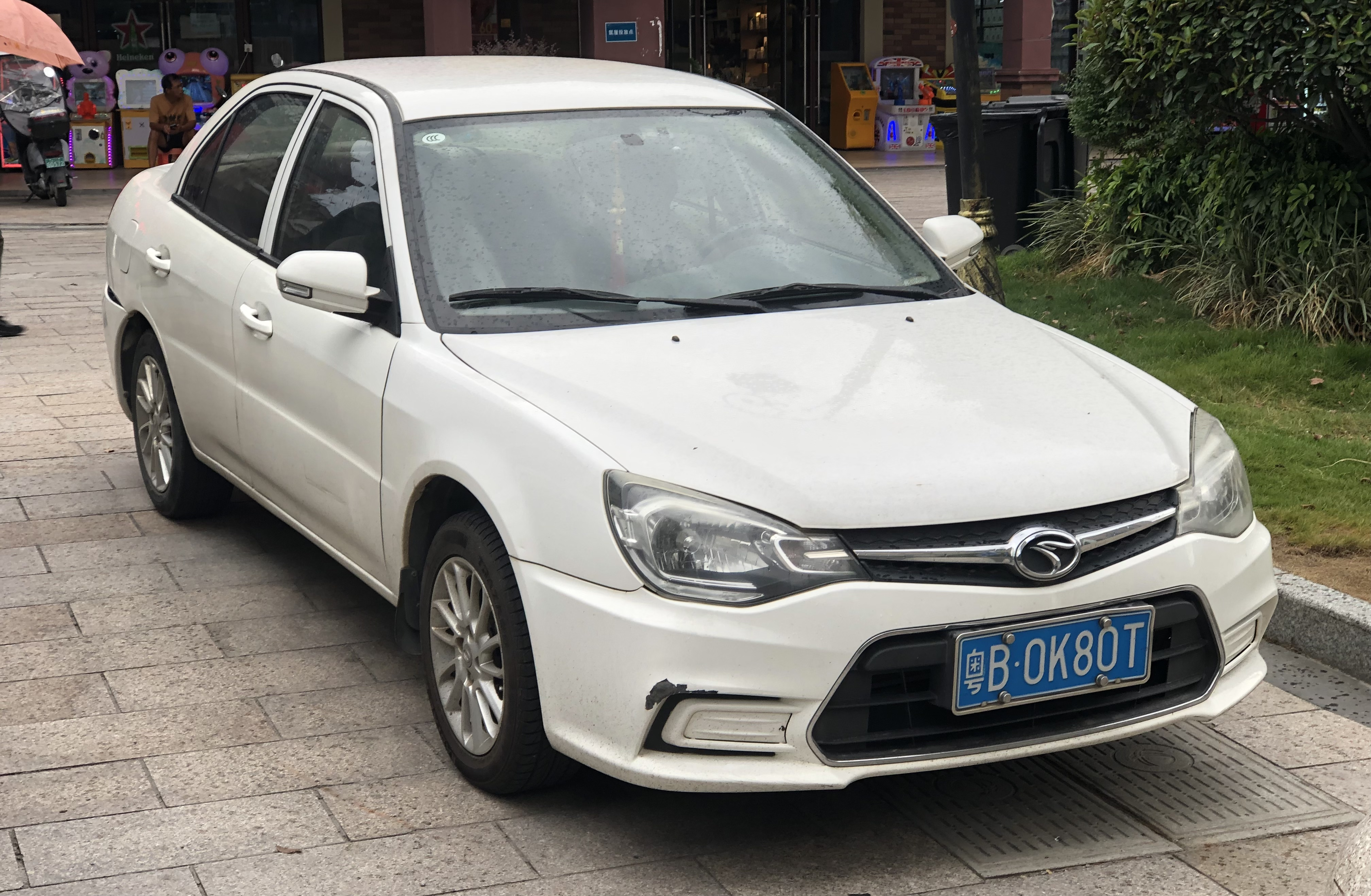
Soueast V3 Lingyue (fourth facelift)

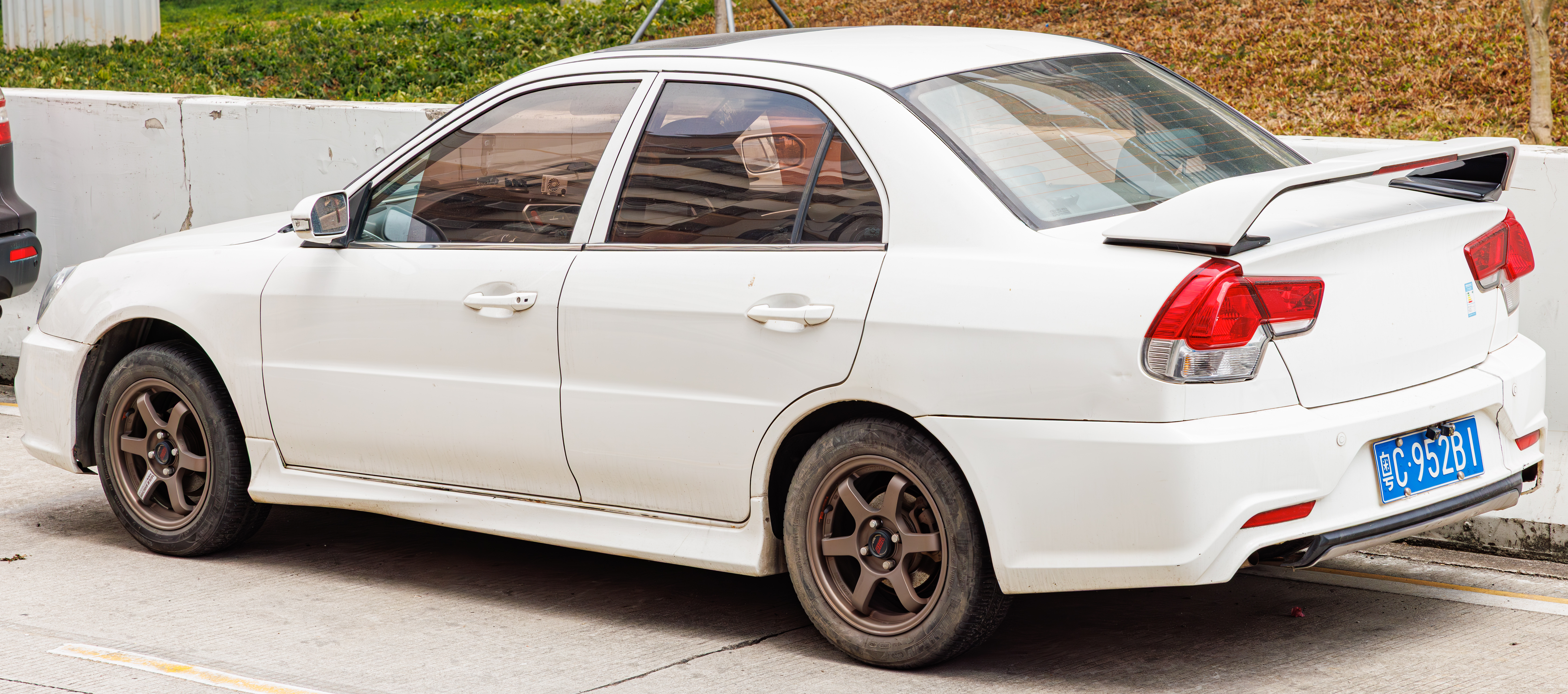
Soueast V3 Lingyue (fourth facelift)

=== Philippines ===
In the Philippines, MMPC introduced it in 1996 as the Lancer sedan. Initially it was offered in three grades; EL, GL, and the top-spec GLXi which are locally assembled at MMPC's Cainta assembly plant. The EL & GL grades are powered by either a 1.3- or 1.5-liter carburated engine, while the GLXi is powered by a 1.6-liter inline-four engine all paired to a standard 5-speed manual or a 4-speed automatic transmission (GL & GLXi only).

In 1997, MMPC added the Limited Saloon & GSR coupé variants to the lineup. Both grades are still powered by the 1.6-liter inline-four engine with a choice of a standard 5-speed manual or INVECS 4-speed automatic transmission. The "Limited Saloon" featured redesigned grille, leather upholstery, JBL speakers, taillight garnish, power adjustable seats (driver side only), keyless entry among other features.

In 1998, the Lancer GSR coupé received a facelift. It featured strut bar, leather steering wheel and seats, dual airbags, and ABS. The Lancer GSR is powered by the same 1.6-liter four-cylinder engine found on the GLXi & Limited Saloon grades. It is paired to a INVECS 4-speed automatic transmission.

In 1999, Mitsubishi added another trim the "MX" to compete with Nissan's "Sentra Exalta" & Toyota's "Corolla SE-G". The MX trim is powered by a 1.6-liter inline-four engine coupled to a 4-speed automatic transmission with manu-matic shift mode, respectively. It featured leather seats, automatic climate control and wood paneling.

By mid-2000, Mitsubishi axed the EL and GL model trims in favor of the Lancer GLS and GLX trims which featured redesigned appearance from the Taiwanese-market Lancer and cloth seats, it was launched in 2001.

=== India ===
This series also entered Indian production in June 1998 as the Lancer, assembled by Hindustan Motors. Available model variants were LX sedans with either the 1.5-liter gasoline engine or 2.0-liter naturally aspirated diesel and a five-speed manual transmission. The gasoline option produces 93 PS (68 kW) while the diesel only offered 68 PS (50 kW). The first facelift arrived in 2001, which was baswd on the Taiwanese market Lancer. In 2004, the 1.8-liter 122 PS (90 kW) 1.8-liter gasoline engine was added, only in conjunction with a four-speed automatic transmission, while the power of the 1.5 was downgraded to 87 PS (64 kW). The Lancer was joined by the Lancer Cedia in 2006 with another makeover based on the Japanese market Lancer Exceed and continued to be sold alongside that model until discontinued in 2012.

== Sixth generation (A00/LA, A10; 2012-2024) ==
Sixth generation (A00/A10/LA)
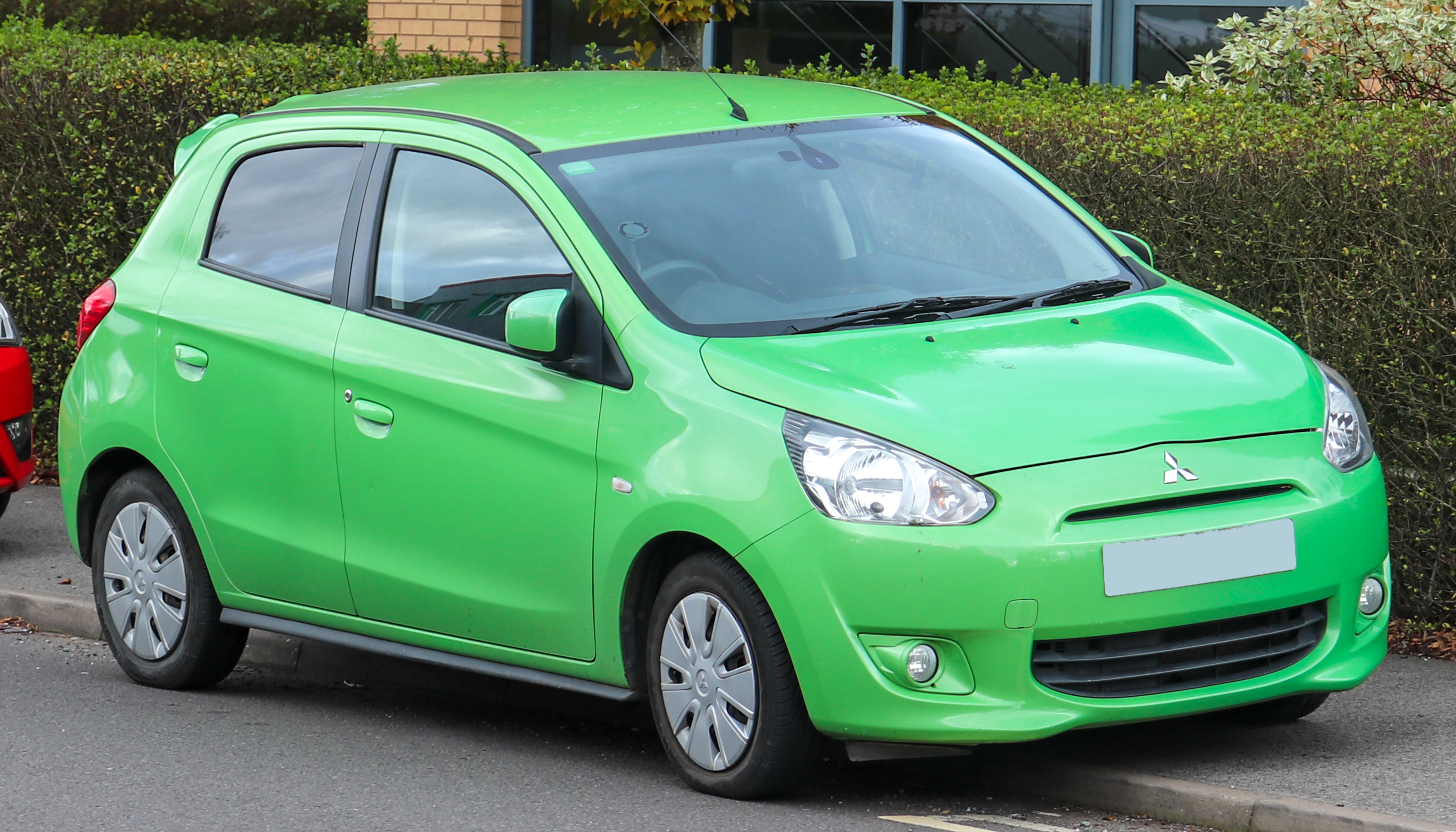
- Pre-facelift

Overview
- Also called: Mitsubishi Space Star; Mitsubishi Attrage (sedan); Mitsubishi Mirage G4 (sedan); Dodge Attitude (sedan, Mexico)
- Production: April 2012–2024 (hatchback); June 2013–2024 (sedan)
- Model years: 2013–present (hatchback); 2014–2024 (sedan); 2014–2024 (North America)
- Assembly: Thailand: Laem Chabang (MMTh); Philippines: Santa Rosa (MMPC, 2016–present)
- Designer: Hideyasu Nakagami (2010); Tsunehiro Kunimoto & Seiji Watanabe (2020)

Body and chassis
- Class: Subcompact car/supermini (B)
- Body style: 4-door sedan 5-door hatchback
- Layout: Front-engine, front-wheel-drive

Powertrain
- Engine: Gasoline: 1.0 L 3A90 I3; 1.2 L 3A92 I3
- Transmission: 5-speed Mitsubishi F5MDB manual Jatco JF015E CVT7 CVT

Dimensions
- Wheelbase: Hatchback: 2,450 mm (96.5 in); Sedan: 2,550 mm (100.4 in)
- Length: Hatchback: 3,710 mm (146.1 in) (pre-facelift); 3,845 mm (151.4 in) (facelift); Sedan: 4,245 mm (167.1 in); 4,305 mm (169.5 in) (facelift)
- Width: Hatchback: 1,665 mm (65.6 in); Sedan: 1,670 mm (65.7 in)
- Height: Hatchback: 1,490 mm (58.7 in); Sedan: 1,515 mm (59.6 in)
- Curb weight: 820–955 kg (1,808–2,105 lb)

Chronology
- Predecessor: Mitsubishi Colt
- Successor: Mitsubishi Colt (2023)

The Colt was renamed back to Mirage in 2012. The sixth generation was previewed as a concept car at the 2011 Geneva International Motor Show, with series production cars unveiled at the 2011 Tokyo Motor Show. For some European markets, the name Mitsubishi Space Star is used. The model code is A00, although in Australia it is referred to as the LA.

The Mirage was built at Mitsubishi Thailand's Laem Chabang plant, facility number three since 19 April 2012. The car is mainly developed as a response to the Eco Car policy endorsed by the Thailand government. The car effectively doubled Mitsubishi sales figures in the country. Shipments to Japan began in July, with the Australian hitting the market in January 2013. Mitsubishi Motors Philippines began manufacturing both the hatchback and G4 sedan variants of the Mirage for the country's market in January 2017.

In designing the Mirage, Mitsubishi's objectives were affordability (including in developing economies) and high efficiency. To aid efficiency, minimizing vehicle mass was one engineering focus. "Painstaking efforts to reduce weight", including the use of high-tensile steel in the body, resulted in a vehicle that is the lightest in its segment in some markets. In North America, it is the lightest 4-door car available (only the 2-passenger Smart Fortwo is lighter).

Reducing aerodynamic drag was another primary design goal. One of the car's aerodynamic features resulted in a new patent application. The result is the lowest drag coefficient (Cd) in its class. Depending on drivetrain and options, the car's Cd ranges from 0.27 to 0.31.

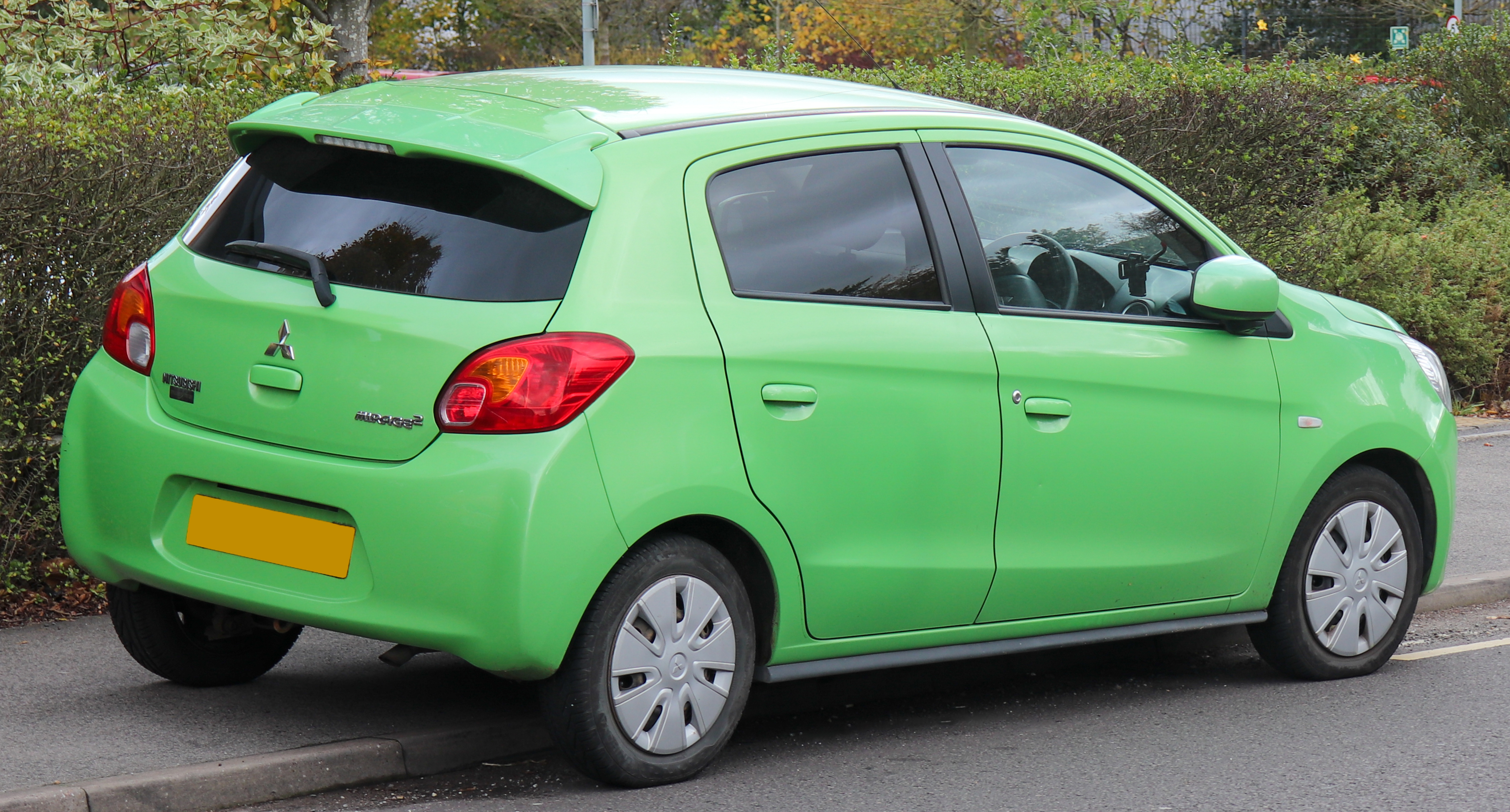
Rear

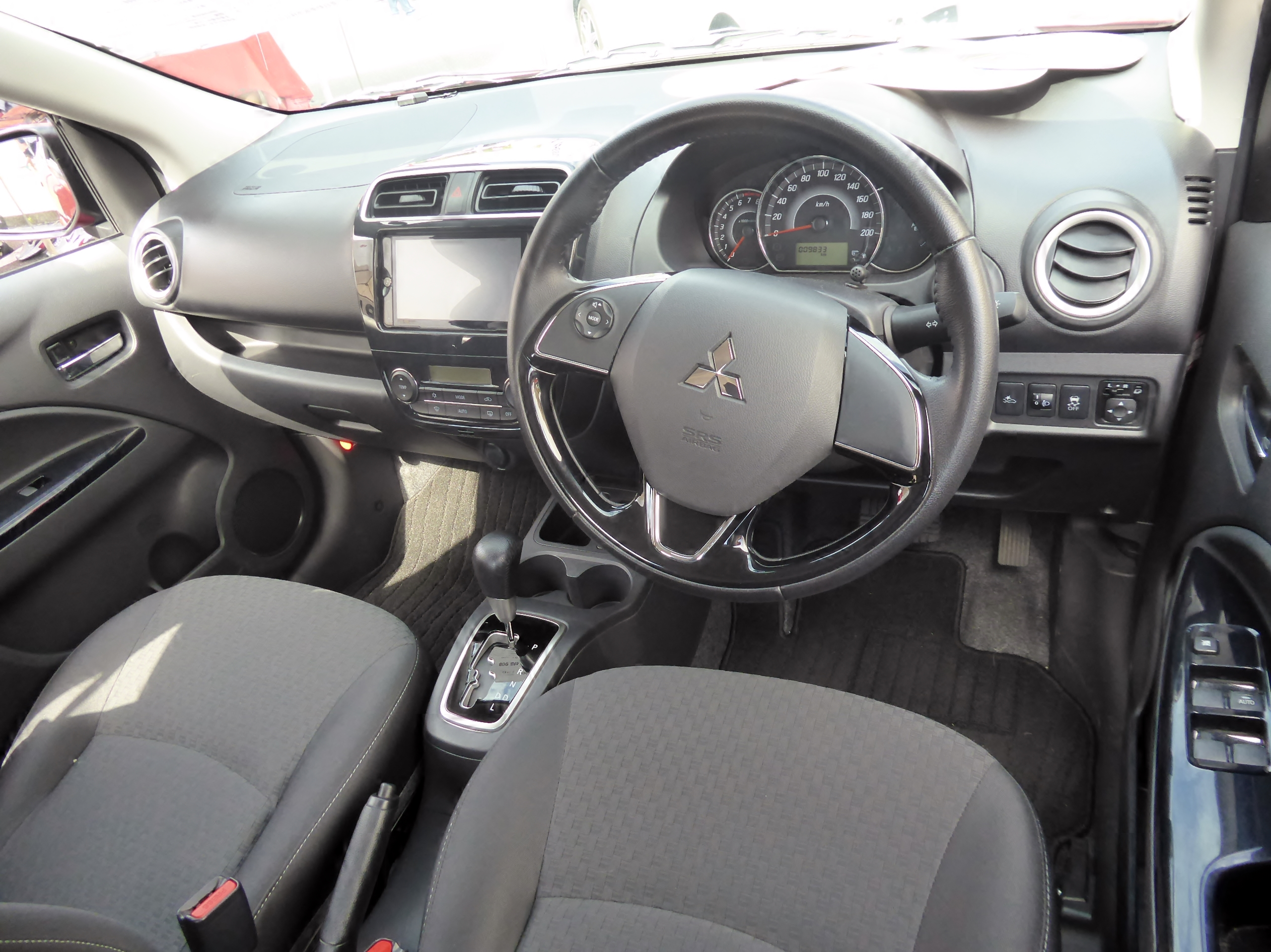
Interior

=== Markets ===
==== Japan ====
Early Japanese models has 1.0-litre 3-cylinder engine with Auto Stop & Go (AS&G), CVT and 165/65 R14 tires. The 1.0-litre three-cylinder car for the Japanese market achieves 27.2 km/L (64 miles per US gallon) in the JC08 cycle and will have a sub-1 million yen price tag. From December 2014, the larger 1.2-litre engine was available on the G model. In Japan, the first facelift went on sale in January 2016, at which time the 1.0 was also discontinued and replaced by the 1.2 across the board. The second facelift arrived in April 2020.

Because of complications with gaining type approval for the electric power steering and slow sales, Mitsubishi stopped importing the Mirage to Japan at the end of March 2023. The car's effective successor in the Japanese market is the Delica D:2.

==== Thailand ====
The Thai market model was unveiled at the 2012 Bangkok International Motor Show on 28 March 2012. The Thai model features the 1.2-litre three-cylinder engine with start-stop, fitted with a CVT or manual transmission.

==== Philippines ====
In the Philippines, the Mirage was launched in mid-2012 and was initially offered in GLX and GLS grade levels. Both variants were available with either 5-speed manual transmission or CVT. All models are powered by the 1.2-litre engine. In late 2013, the sedan version called G4 was added to the lineup and was also available in the same 2 grades as the hatchback. In its first full year of sales (2013), the Mirage reached a place as the sixth best selling hatchback. The refreshed Mirage hatch launched in the country in April 2016 while the refreshed G4 launched in April 2018. In February 2021, the grade badges for the hatch were removed. Instead, the hatchback's variants are now simply dubbed Mirage MT and Mirage CVT

==== Indonesia ====
In Indonesia, the Mirage was launched on 17 September 2012 and is imported from Thailand. It is offered in GLX, GLS and Exceed grade levels. The GLX grade is available with 5-speed manual transmission, while GLS and Exceed grades are available with CVT. All models are powered by the 1.2-litre engine. On January 19, 2015, the updated Mirage was launched alongside the launch of the Mirage Sport. The updated Mirage has 15-inch wheels, versus the previous Mirage's 14-inch wheels. The Mirage Sport is based on a GLS grade with a body kit and DRLs. The facelifted Mirage was released on 26 July 2016. The Mirage was discontinued in the Indonesian market in 2018.

==== North America ====
The North American edition was unveiled at the 2013 Salon International de l'auto de Montreal. Despite previous speculation, the car was marketed as the Mirage in the United States and Canada for the 2014 model year. Canada/U.S. models include 1.2-litre three-cylinder MIVEC engine, five-speed manual transmission or CVT, choice of eight body colors (Kiwi Green, Thunder Gray, Sapphire Blue, InfraRed, Cloud White, Starlight Silver, Plasma Purple and Mystic Black). There was no 2016 model year in the North American market.

In August 2024, Mitsubishi Motors North America confirmed that production of the Mirage would cease later in 2024, expecting inventory to last through the summer of 2025. Its discontinuation left the Nissan Versa as the only new automobile in the United States to have a price tag of under $20,000 after destination charge; Nissan will discontinue the Versa after 2025.

=== First facelift ===
At the 2015 LA Auto Show, Mitsubishi previewed the Mirage's 2017 facelift. The car received a new front end design, projector headlights with LED daytime running lights, and LED tail lights. The facelift results in a drag coefficient of 0.27c_{d}. In addition, engine output was increased from 74 to 78 hp (55 to 58 kW; 75 to 79 PS), the suspension was improved through better shock absorbers, revised spring rates, and upgraded brakes (larger discs on front, drums on rear, and different friction material). The interior also saw numerous aesthetic changes from the steering wheel to the HVAC system and a new optional touchscreen infotainment system using Apple's CarPlay interface and a 300W Rockford Fosgate audio setup. A Rockford Fosgate Edition of the ES trim, fitted with a 300-watt premium stereo, was sometimes available beginning in late 2015. It is typically referred to as the Mirage RF and is fitted with a small Rockford Fosgate sticker.

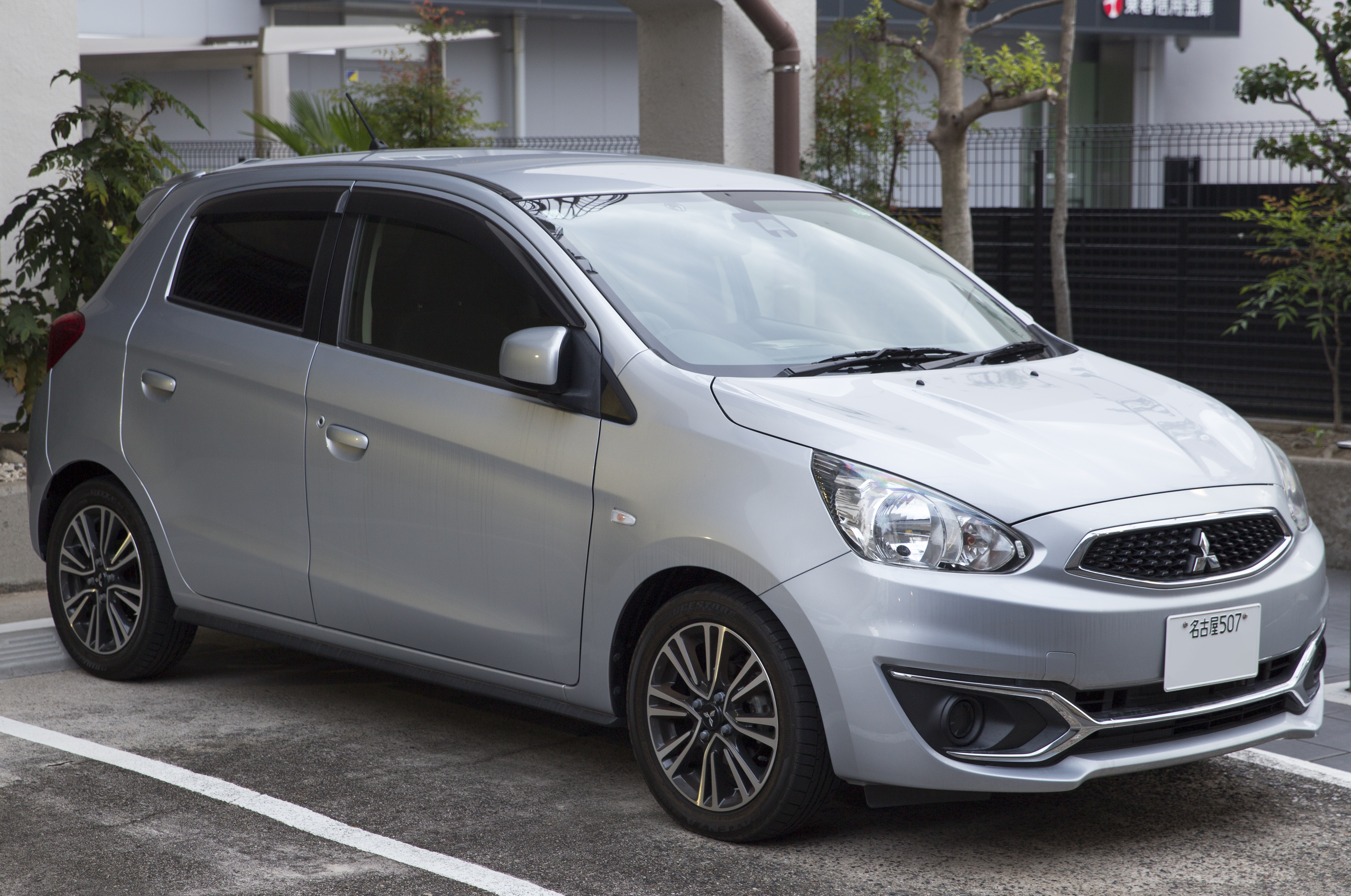
Mirage M (Japan; first facelift)

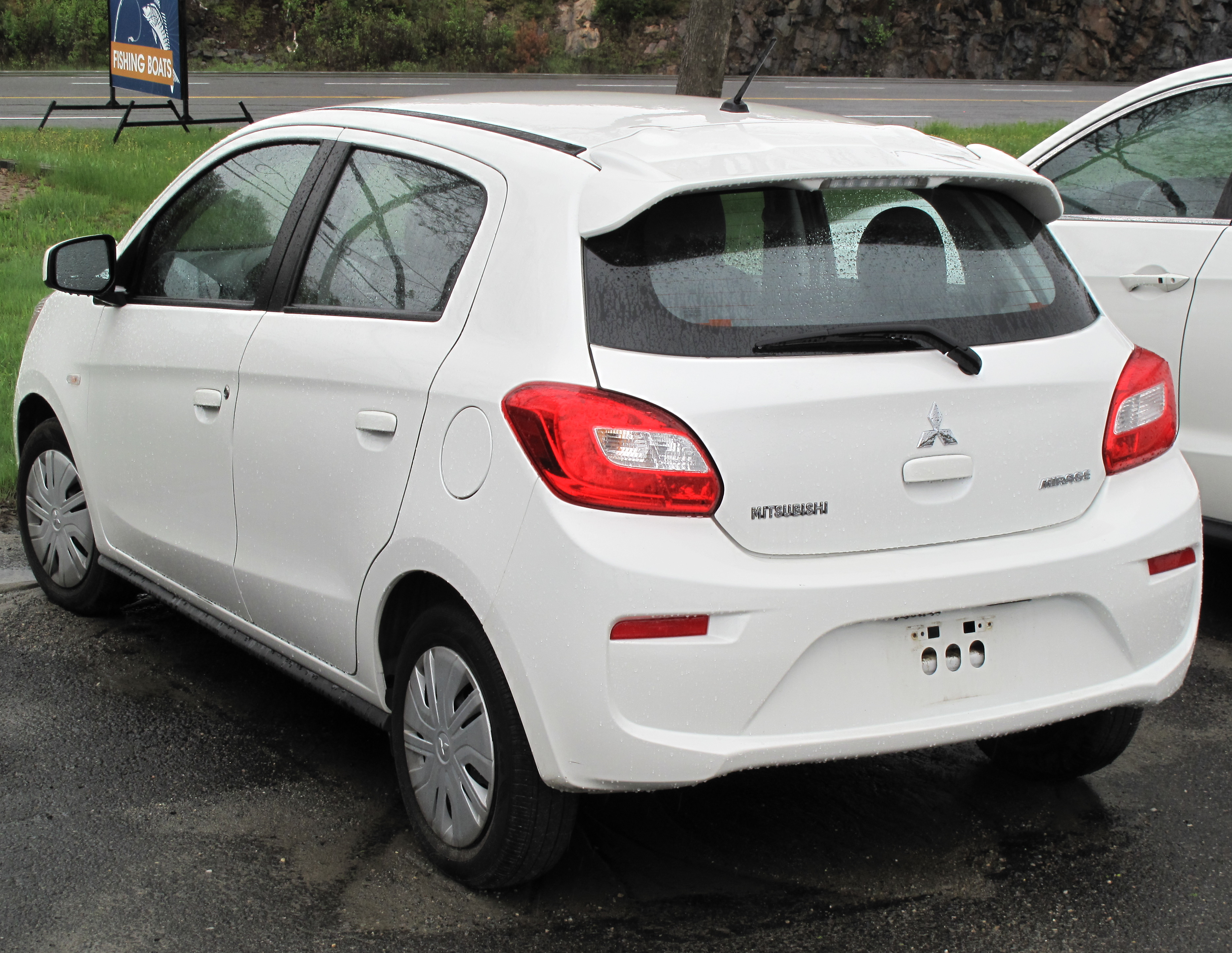
Mirage ES (Canada; first facelift)

=== Second facelift ===
The second facelift of the Mirage was launched in November 2019, with new front end styling to match the company's new design language and allowed for a collision avoidance system to be added. The interior also received updated styling and all models received new touchscreen audio system with support for Apple CarPlay.

In June 2021, an off-road look Space Star Cross is launched in Portugal.

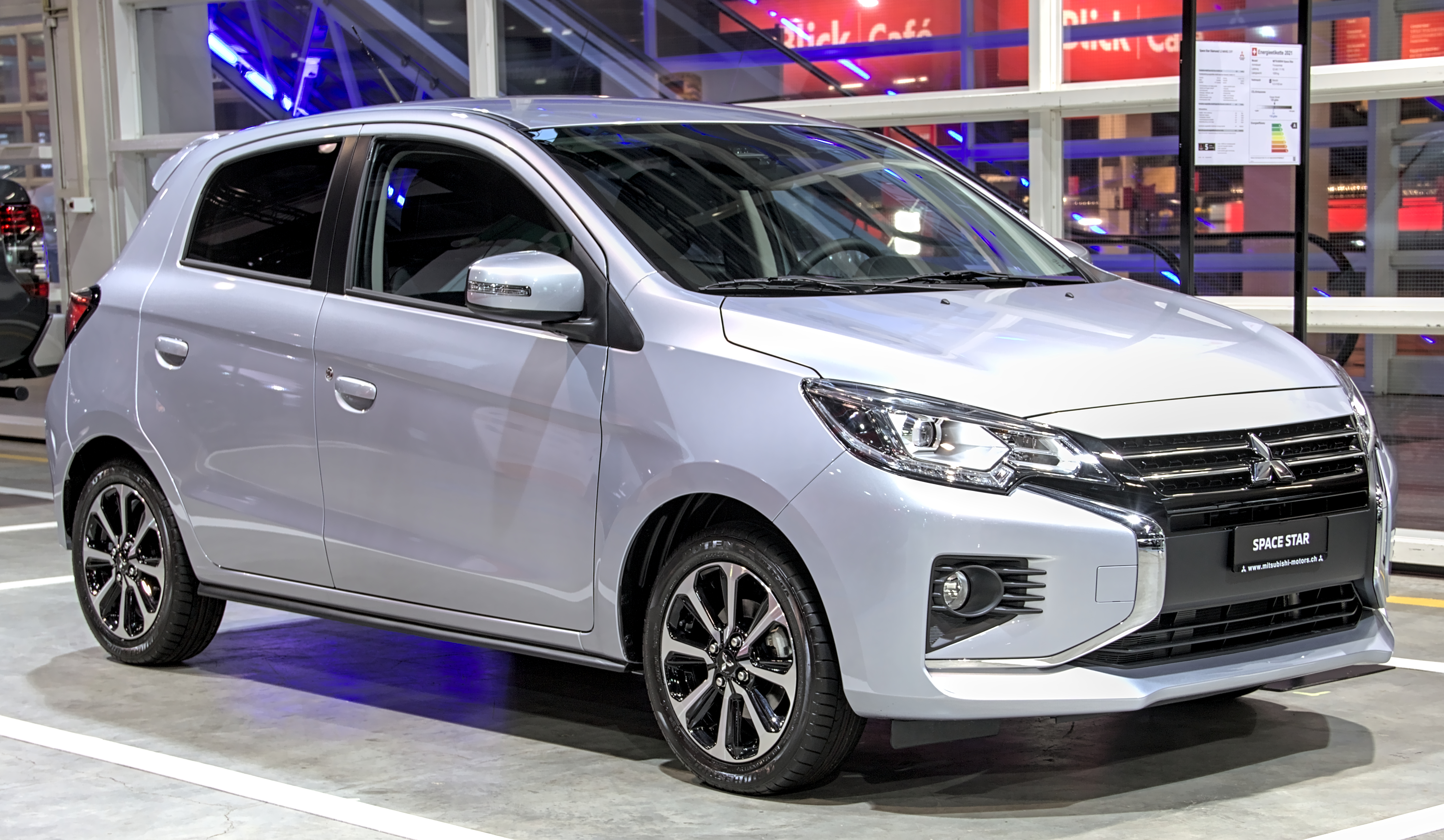
Mitsubishi Space Star Intense (Europe)

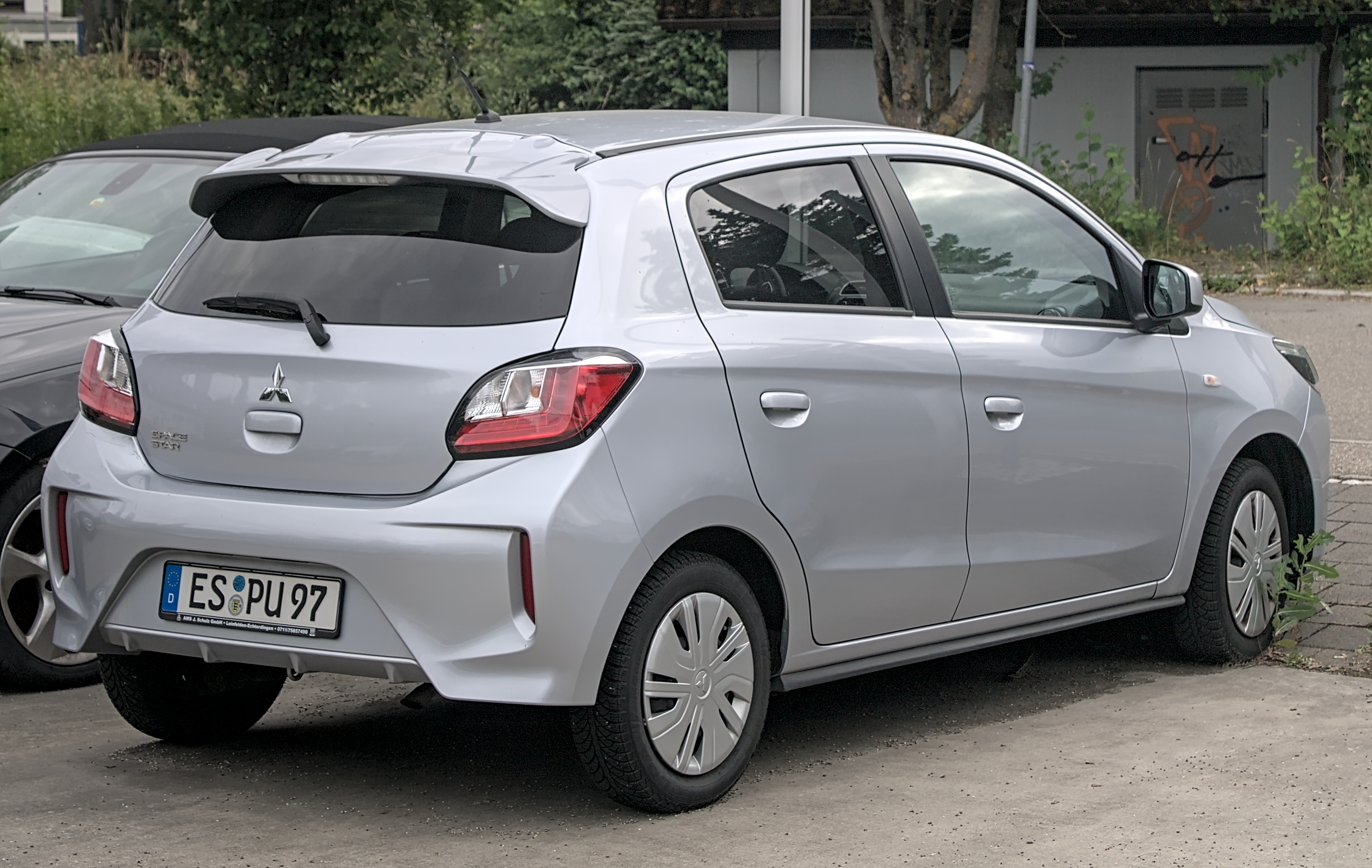
Mitsubishi Space Star (Europe)

| Engine | 1.0 L | 1.2 L |
|---|---|---|
| Format | DOHC, MIVEC VVT, 12-valve I3 | |
| Displacement | 0.999 L (61 cu in) | 1.193 L (72.8 cu in) |
| Bore × stroke | 75 × 75.4 mm (2.95 × 2.97 in) | 75 × 90 mm (2.95 × 3.54 in) |
| Max. output | 51 kW (68 hp; 69 PS) at 6,000 rpm | 59 kW (79 hp; 80 PS) at 6,000 rpm |
| Max. torque | 86 N⋅m (63 lb⋅ft) at 5,000 rpm | 100 N⋅m (74 lb⋅ft) at 4,000 rpm |
| Max. speed | MT: 169 km/h (105 mph); CVT: 161 km/h (100 mph) | MT: 180 km/h (110 mph); CVT: 173 km/h (107 mph) |
| 0 to 100 km/h (sec) | MT: 13.7; CVT: 14.4 | MT: 12.6; CVT: 13.5 |
| Fuel tank capacity | 35 L (9.2 US gal; 7.7 imp gal) | |

=== Sedan (A10) ===
The four-door sedan version of the Mirage, known as Mitsubishi Attrage or Mitsubishi Mirage G4 in some markets, has been manufactured at Mitsubishi's Laem Chabang plant in Thailand since June 2013. The sedan was first introduced as a concept car at the 2013 Bangkok International Motor Show called the Concept G4 sedan. The sedan is only offered with the 1.2-liter engine.

==== Markets ====
The Attrage is sold in few Western European markets such as Austria, Switzerland, Belgium and Luxembourg. The engine is available as a 1.2-liter three-cylinder engine that produces 59 kW (80 hp). A continuously variable transmission is available as an option. The Attrage is also sold in Singapore, Turkey, Malaysia, and the Middle East.

===== Philippines =====
According to Masaaki Yamada, senior adviser for Mitsubishi Motors Philippines, the company used the Mirage G4 name in the Philippine market, as they claimed the "Attrage" nameplate has a negative connotation in the Filipino language. "Attrage" sounds too much like atrás, Filipino or Spanish for "going backwards". The Mirage G4 was released in the Philippine dealerships in October 2013.

In the Philippines, the Mirage G4 received its facelift on 28 August 2021. It is offered in the same trim models as the pre-facelift model: GLX (manual & CVT) and GLS (CVT only).

In January 2022, a limited-edition GLS Sport was introduced. Based on the GLS trim, the GLS Sport featured sideskirts, grille garnish, and rear lip spoiler. Only 300 units were produced.

The limited-edition Black Series was introduced in November 2022. Only 150 units were produced.

On 31 May 2025, the Mirage G4 received LED projector headlamps and taillights as standard for the CVT variants, while all grades received 15-inch two-tone alloy wheels as standard. Safety features such as Active Stability Control (ASC), Hill-start assist (HSA) and Anti-lock braking system (ABS) with Electronic Brakeforce Distribution (EBD) became standard on all grades.

===== Mexico =====
In Mexico, the Attrage is sold as the Dodge Attitude, replacing the Hyundai Accent (RB) from January 2015 model after Hyundai's arrival in the Mexican market.

Starting on 1 February 2019, the Mitsubishi Mirage G4 has been sold in Mexico alongside the return of Mitsubishi in the Mexican market, coexisting with the Dodge Attitude. It was facelifted in August 2020.

===== North America =====
For the US market, the Mirage G4 sedan was available from spring 2016 as a 2017 model. It is available in ES and SE trims, with 7 airbags available as standard.

In Canada, sales of the G4 sedan ran 3 model years, from 2017 to 2019. It was cancelled owing to low sales relative to the hatchback (the G4 made up less than 20% of total Mirage sales in 2018).

===== Thailand =====
The Attrage received its facelift in Thailand on 18 November 2019 with the same front fascia as the second facelift Mirage hatchback. In 1 July 2026, the Attrage has redesign with a front grille.

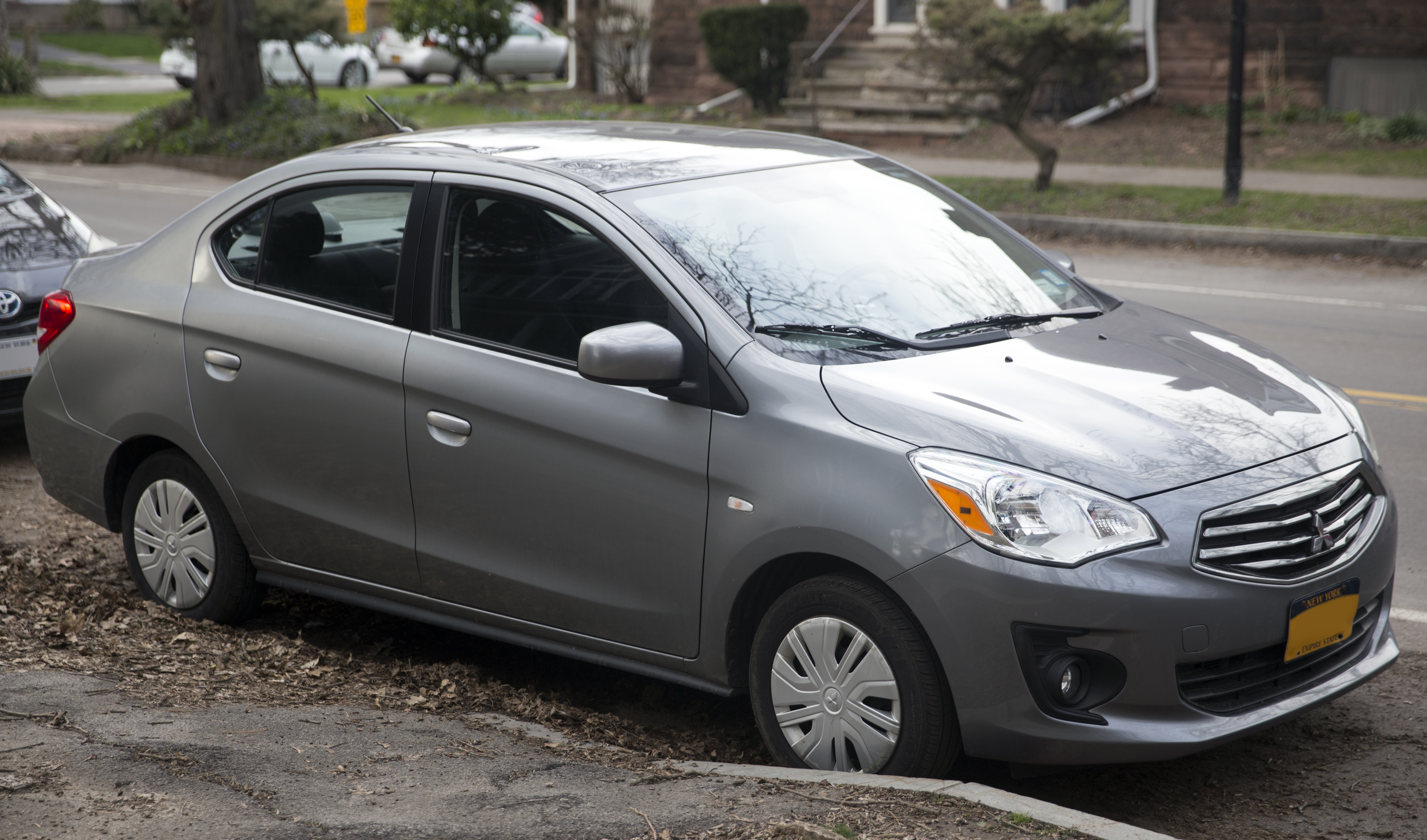
Mitsubishi Mirage G4 (US; pre-facelift)

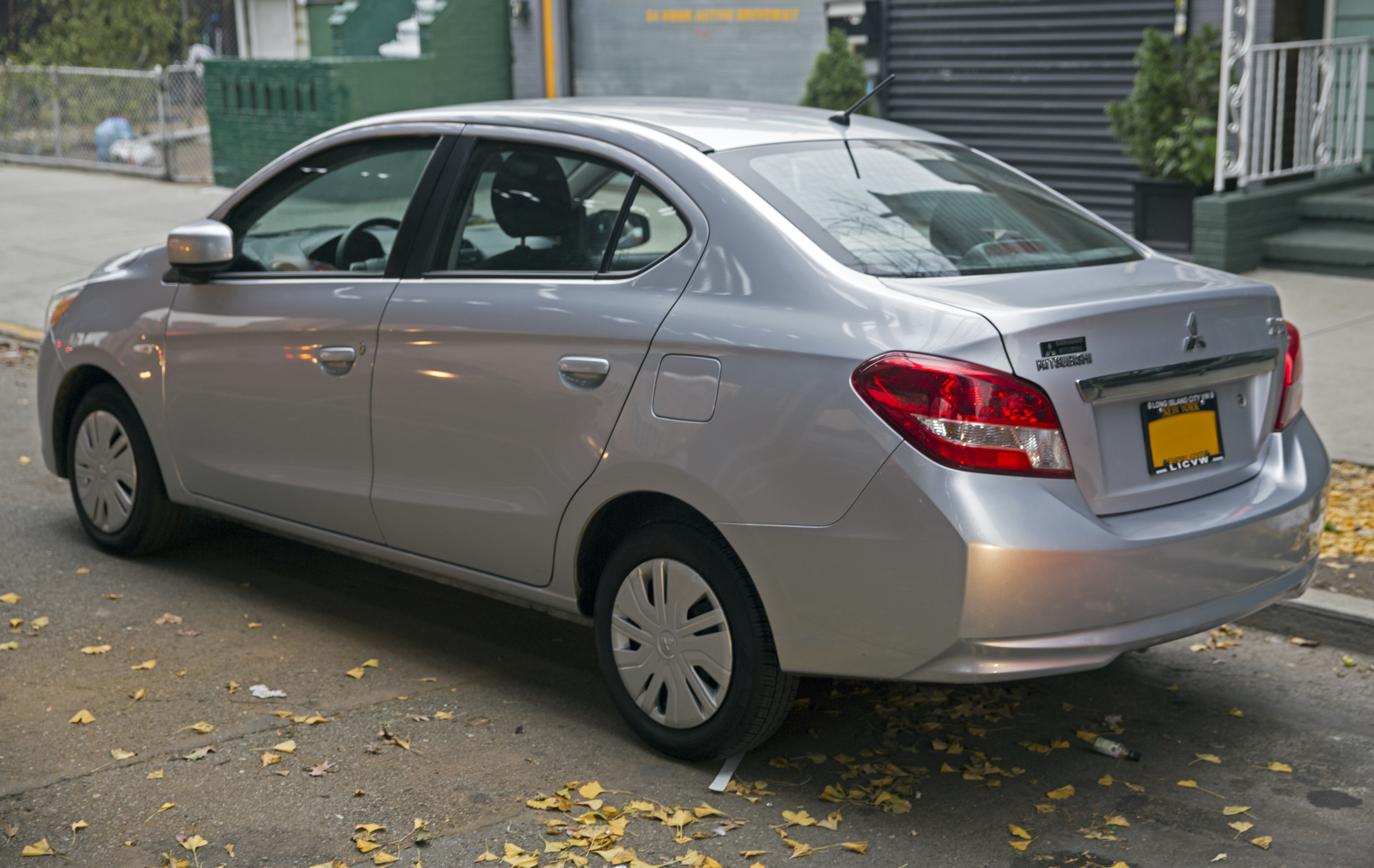
Mitsubishi Mirage G4 (US; pre-facelift)

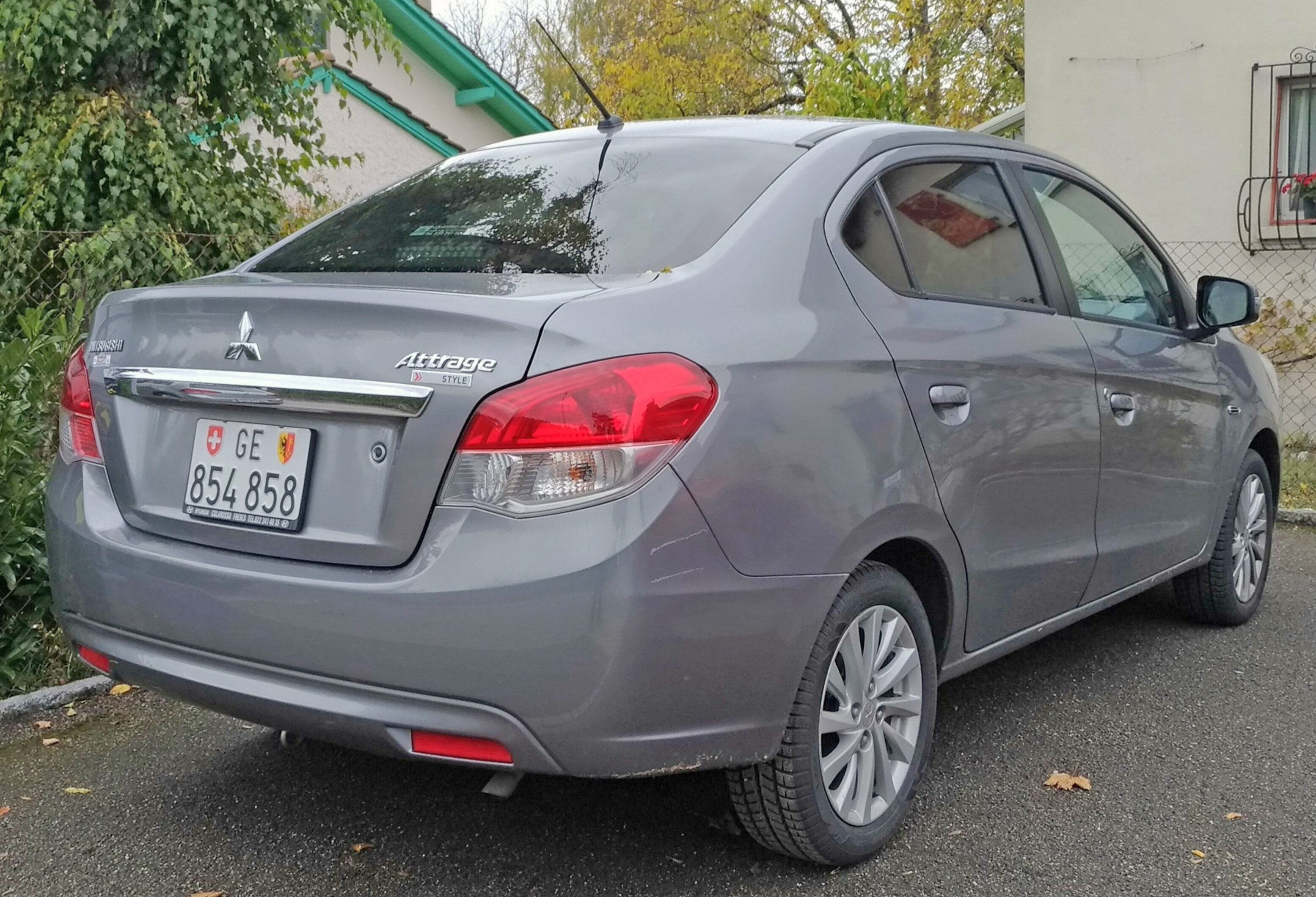
Mitsubishi Attrage (pre-facelift)

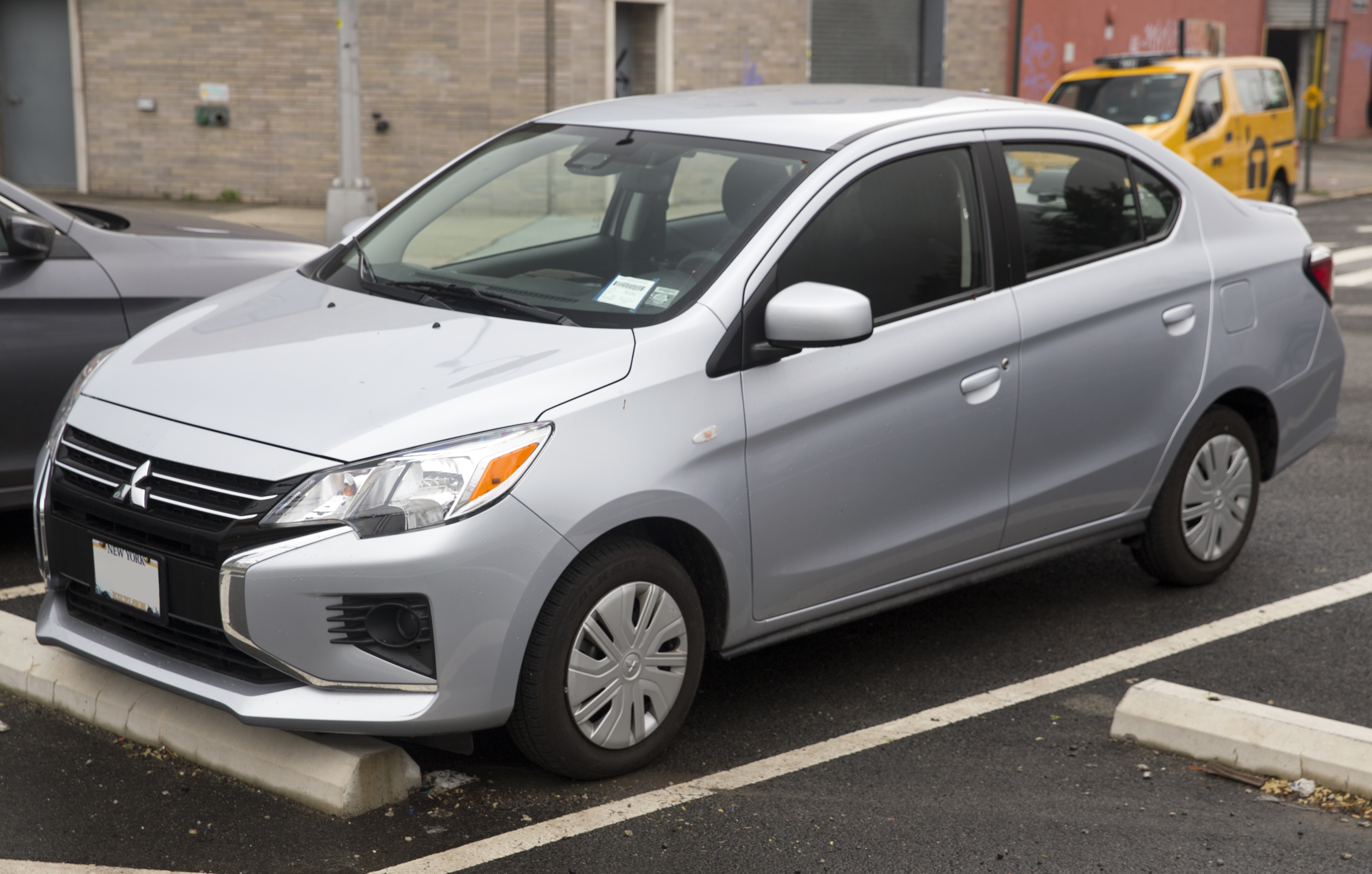
Mitsubishi Mirage G4 (US; first facelift)

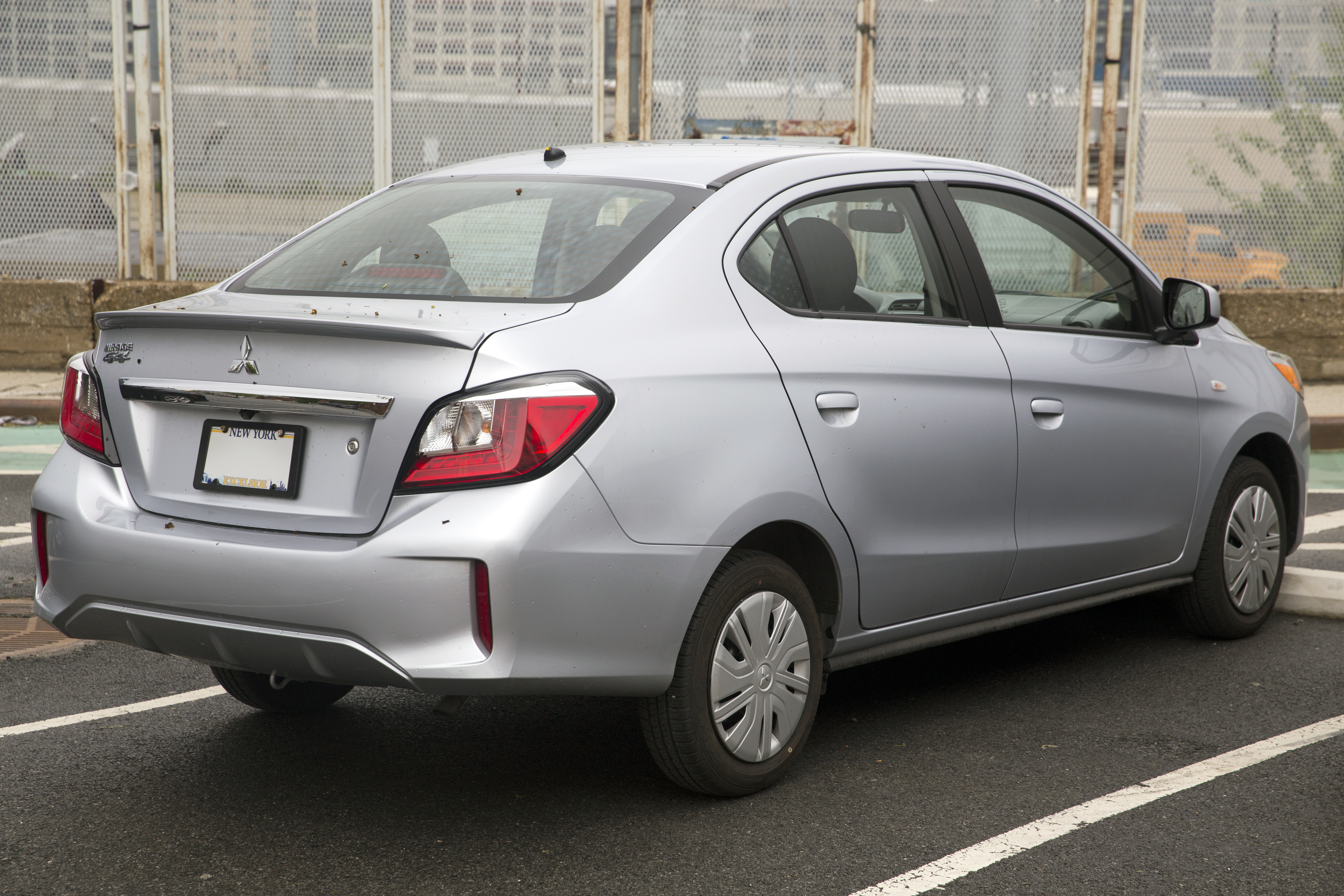
Mitsubishi Mirage G4 (US; first facelift)

Mitsubishi Attrage (second facelift)

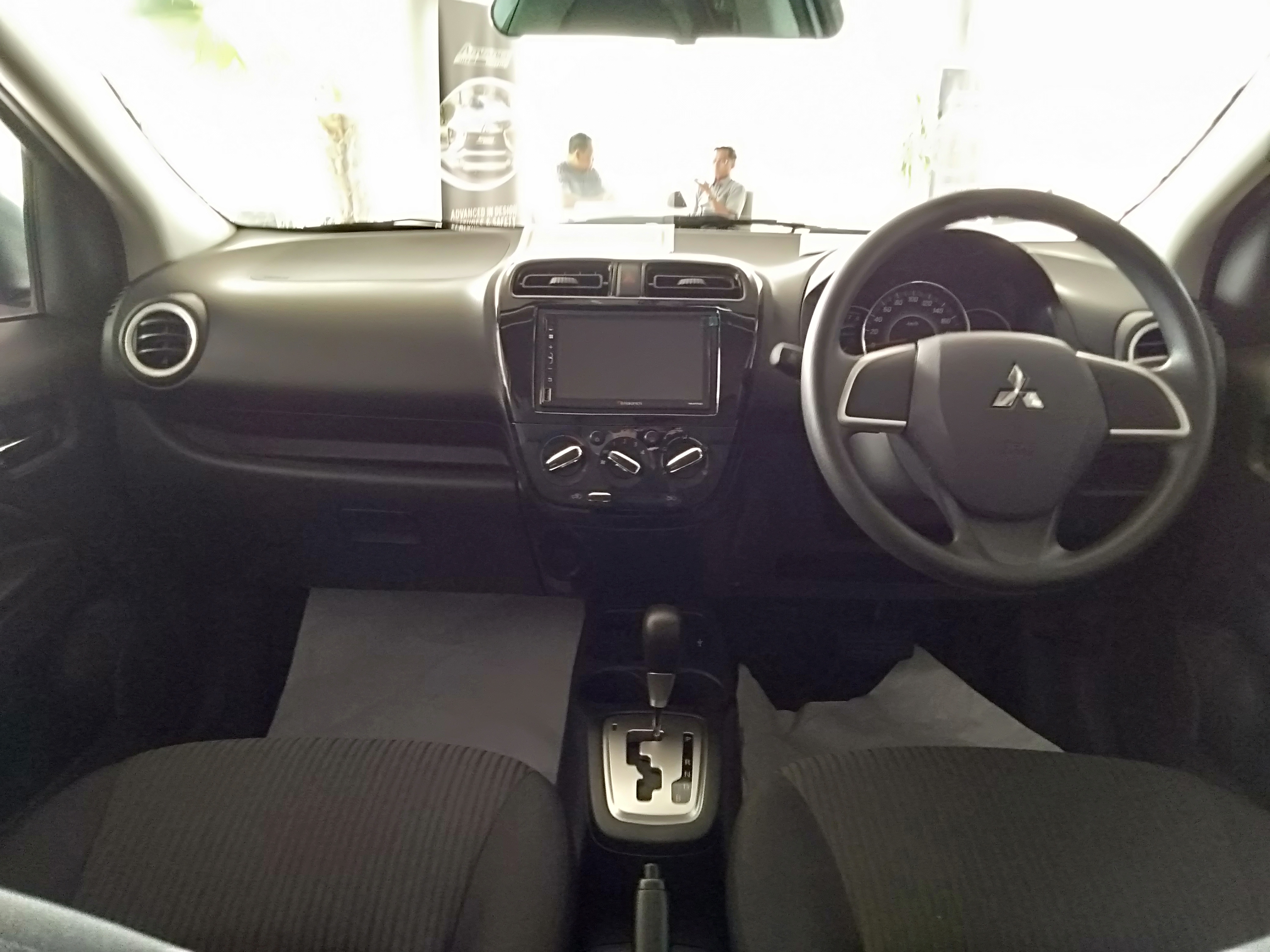
Interior

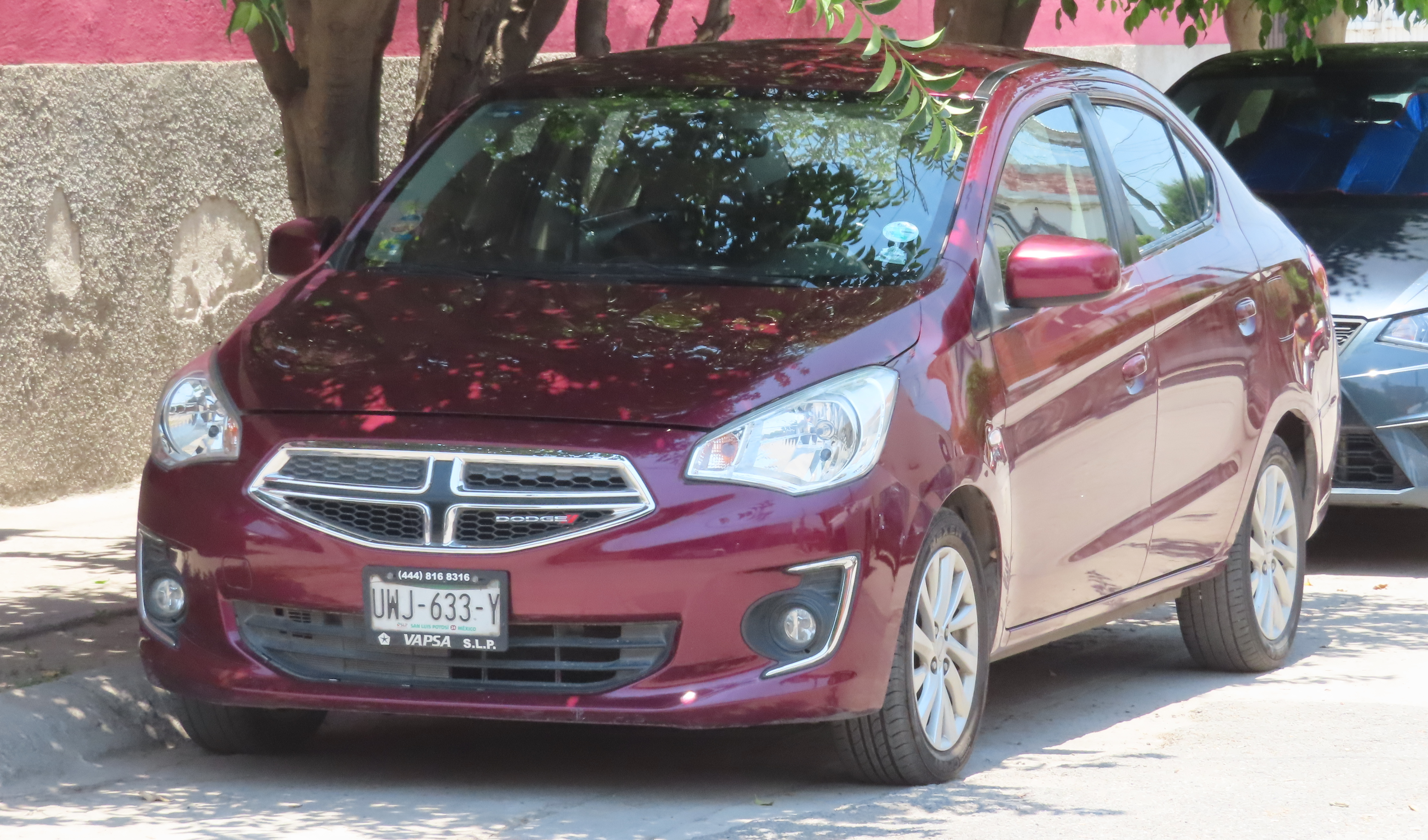
Dodge Attitude

Reception

The current Mirage has proven to be a polarizing design. It has been met with negative reviews in some markets, and praise in others. Favorable reviews highlight the efficiency of the design, while critics often illustrate the car's shortcomings, with a tendency to compare the Mirage with more expensive cars.

Auto Express and Ollie Kew of Car Magazine all gave the car a two out of five star rating. Peter Anderson of The Motor Report gave it two-and-a-half out of five stars. What Car? magazine rated the Mirage 3 out of 5 stars for "cost and verdict." Matt Jones of Top Gear magazine gave the Mirage an Overall Verdict of 3 out of 10. Sam Wollaston of The Guardian gave the car a Cool Factor rating of 3 out of 10. Consumer Reports placed the Mirage among the 10 Worst Cars of 2013 and Top Gear magazine placed the Mirage on its list of "The worst cars you can buy right now."

Jason Torchinsky of Jalopnik rated the 2014 Mirage an 8 out of 10 for Value and argued that other journalists gave it excessive criticism, saying "I get the appeal of writing a bad review — they're a hell of a lot more fun to write than a good review... But you have to keep that critic-lust in check, sometimes, and try and really get to the truth of things."

On the positive side, Kelley Blue Book gave the Mirage an overall rating of 6.2 (with a Consumer Rating of 9.4/10), quoting that "If the most important thing to you is getting the cheapest new car you can find with the most equipment and best possible fuel economy, you'll like the 2015 Mitsubishi Mirage." The Mirage was named one of Forbes magazine's 12 Greenest Cars of 2014, and was one of two non-hybrid vehicles on the list. In the Philippines, the Mirage was awarded the "2012–2013 Car of the Year" by the Car Awards Group. Top Gear Philippines rated the car 18 out of 20, and stated, "For the single person or young couple on a budget, the Mirage is still the sweetest deal in town." In Denmark, the Space Star received largely positive reviews, and was the fifth most sold car in January–February 2015. The Hispanic Motor Press awarded the Mirage as Best Subcompact in 2014 and recognized the Mirage G4 as Best Subcompact in 2017. Company Vehicle of New Zealand praises the Mirage, calling it "an ideal city commuter which is absolutely effortless to slip into even the tightest of parking spaces". The Automotive Science Group has recognized the Mirage for Best All-Around Performance and Best Economic Performance. Patrick Rall of Torque News praised the 2018 Mirage GT, noting it as a "great winter commuter car" with "lots of features". Brian Wong of Cars.com called the Mirage GT "fun to drive" and praised its light-weight design. Erik Shilling notes that after eight years on the market, "the Mirage is probably the best kind of car there is: a cheap car that functions, and isn't pretending otherwise."

=== Safety ===
ASEAN NCAP test results for a right-hand-drive, five-door hatchback variant on a 2013 registration:

ASEAN NCAP test results Mitsubishi Mirage (2013)
| Test | Points | Stars |
|---|---|---|
| Adult occupant: | 13.07 | 4 /5 stars |
| Child occupant: | 43% | 0 /5 stars |
| Safety assist: | NA | |

ANCAP test results* Mitsubishi Mirage (2013)
| Test | Score |
|---|---|
| Overall | 5 /5 stars |
| Frontal offset | 14.07/16 |
| Side impact | 16/16 |
| Pole | 2/2 |
| Seat belt reminders | 2/3 |
| Whiplash protection | Good |
| Pedestrian protection | Adequate |
| Electronic stability control | Standard |

== Production and sales ==
=== Production ===
| Year | Thailand | | Philippines | | Total |
| Year | Mirage | Attrage | Mirage | Mirage G4 | Total |
|---|---|---|---|---|---|
| 2011 | 20 | - | - | - | 20 |
| 2012 | 122,633 | - | - | - | 122,633 |
| 2013 | 97,938 | 47,006 | - | - | 144,944 |
| 2014 | 100,240 | 29,850 | - | - | 130,090 |
| 2015 | 83,857 | 53,733 | - | - | 137,590 |
| 2016 | 86,189 | 65,329 | - | 1,388 | 152,906 |
| 2017 | 71,927 | 64,033 | 4,633 | 10,475 | 151,068 |
| 2018 | 77,577 | 60,879 | 3,885 | 14,072 | 156,413 |

(Sources: Facts & Figures 2013 Archived 2013-12-02 at the Wayback Machine, Facts & Figures 2018, Facts & Figures 2019, Mitsubishi Motors website)

=== Sales ===
| Calendar year | Mirage (sedan & hatchback) | | Mirage Hatchback/Space Star | | | | Mirage G4/Attrage | | | | | Dodge Attitude Sedan |
| Calendar year | United States | Canada | Mexico | Europe | Thailand | Philippines | Philippines | Europe | Thailand | Vietnam | Mexico | Mexico |
|---|---|---|---|---|---|---|---|---|---|---|---|---|
| 2012 | | | | 34 | | | | | | | | |
| 2013 | 2,935 | 614 | | 13,978 | | | | | | | | |
| 2014 | 16,708 | 4,048 | | 22,008 | 10,990 | | | 20 | 11,722 | | | |
| 2015 | 21,515 | 3,361 | 3,552 | 29,547 | 4,290 | 5,106 | 8,192 | 352 | 11,020 | | | 13,778 |
| 2016 | 22,226 | 3,112 | 4,701 | 27,386 | 7,070 | 7,346 | 11,888 | 168 | 9,005 | | | 20,356 |
| 2017 | 22,386 | 2,502 | 7,185 | 30,016 | 9,585 | 20,032 | | 114 | 13,247 | | | 19,433 |
| 2018 | 22,568 | 1,570 | 5,678 | 36,105 | 15,714 | 14,763 | | 62 | 10,371 | | | 14,892 |
| 2019 | 26,966 | 2,156 | 4,081 | 38,002 | 3,015 | 19,769 | | 88 | 4,316 | | 2,754 | 11,664 |
| 2020 | 19,135 | 1,230 | 1,160 | 35,703 | 4,278 | 555 | 8,638 | 1 | 5,812 | | 2,589 | 6,357 |
| 2021 | 22,743 | 909 | 5 | 32,662 | 4,402 | 615 | 5,962 | | 5,651 | 6,075 | 6,116 | 7,046 |
| 2022 | 15,814 | | 0 | 27,964 | 4,063 | | | | 4,557 | 7,214 | 3,891 | 7,092 |
| 2023 | 13,220 | | 249 | | 2,841 | | 23,400 | | 3,515 | 5,050 | 3,967 | 8,644 |
| 2024 | 29,768 | 2,932 | 0 | | 3,185 | | 26,313 | | 3,698 | 2,499 | 4,030 | |
| 2025 | 14,577 | 1,776 | | | | | | | | | | |

== Bibliography ==
- Long, Brian (2007). Mitsubishi Lancer Evo: The Road Car & WRC Story. Dorchester: Veloce Publishing. ISBN 978-1-84584-055-6.
