= Compact MPV =

Vehicle size class

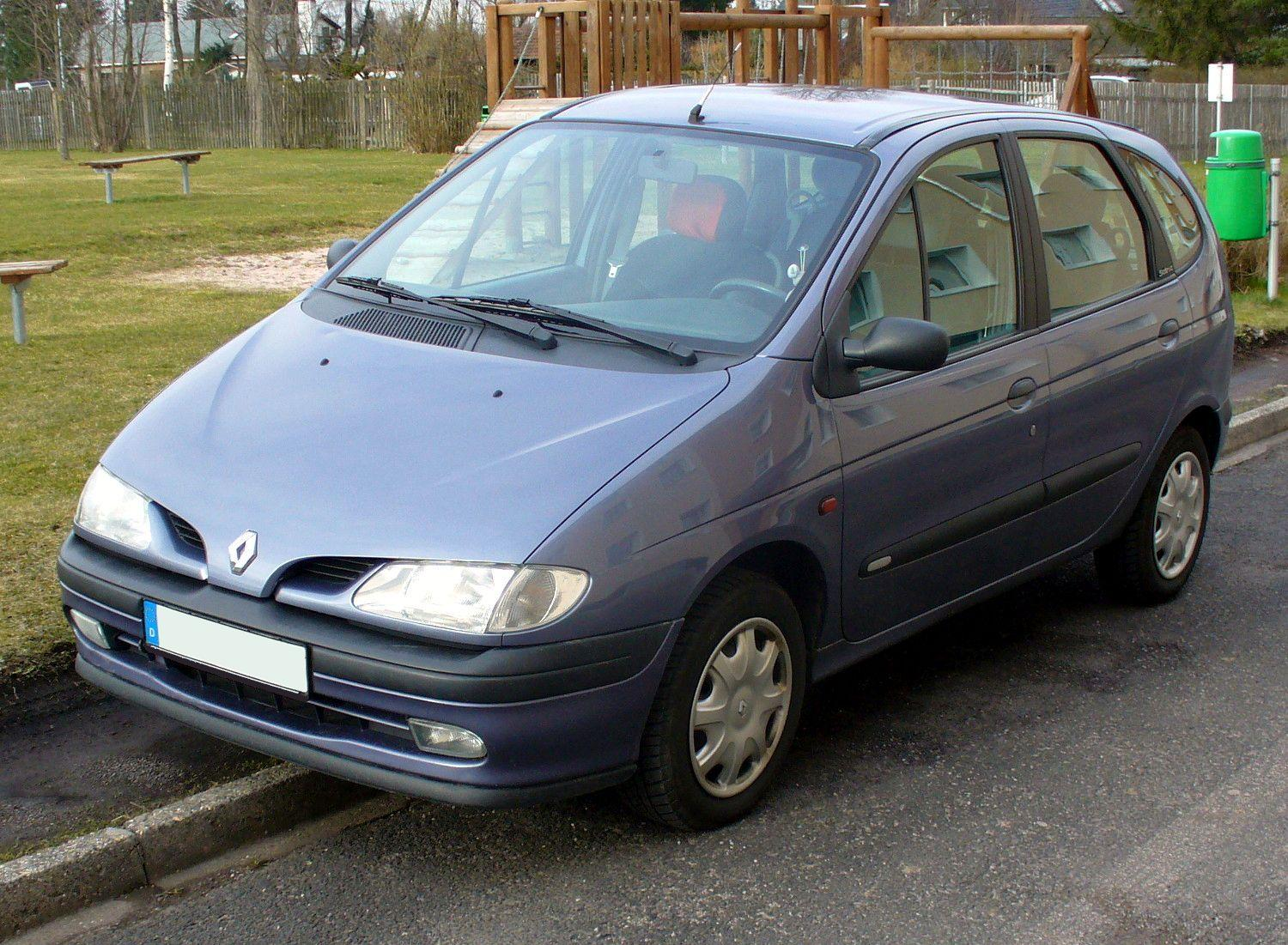
Renault Scénic I (1996–2003)

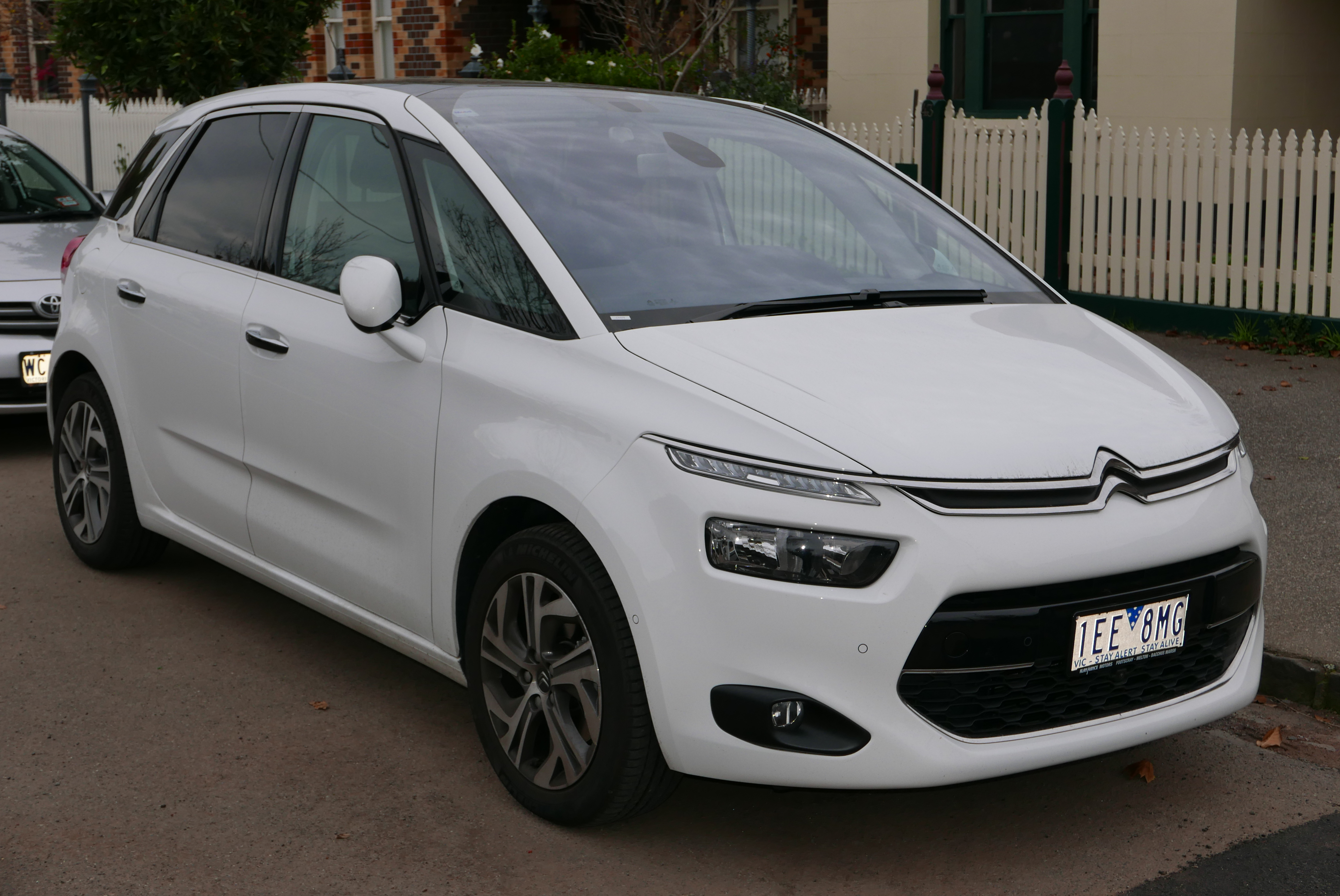
Citroën C4 Picasso IV (2013–2022)

Compact MPV (an abbreviation for Compact Multi-Purpose Vehicle) is a vehicle size class for the middle size of MPVs. The Compact MPV size class sits between the mini MPV and large MPV (minivan) size classes.

Compact MPVs remain predominantly a European phenomenon, although they are also built and sold in many Latin American, African, and Asian markets. As of 2016, the only compact MPV sold widely in the United States was the Ford C-Max.

== Characteristics ==
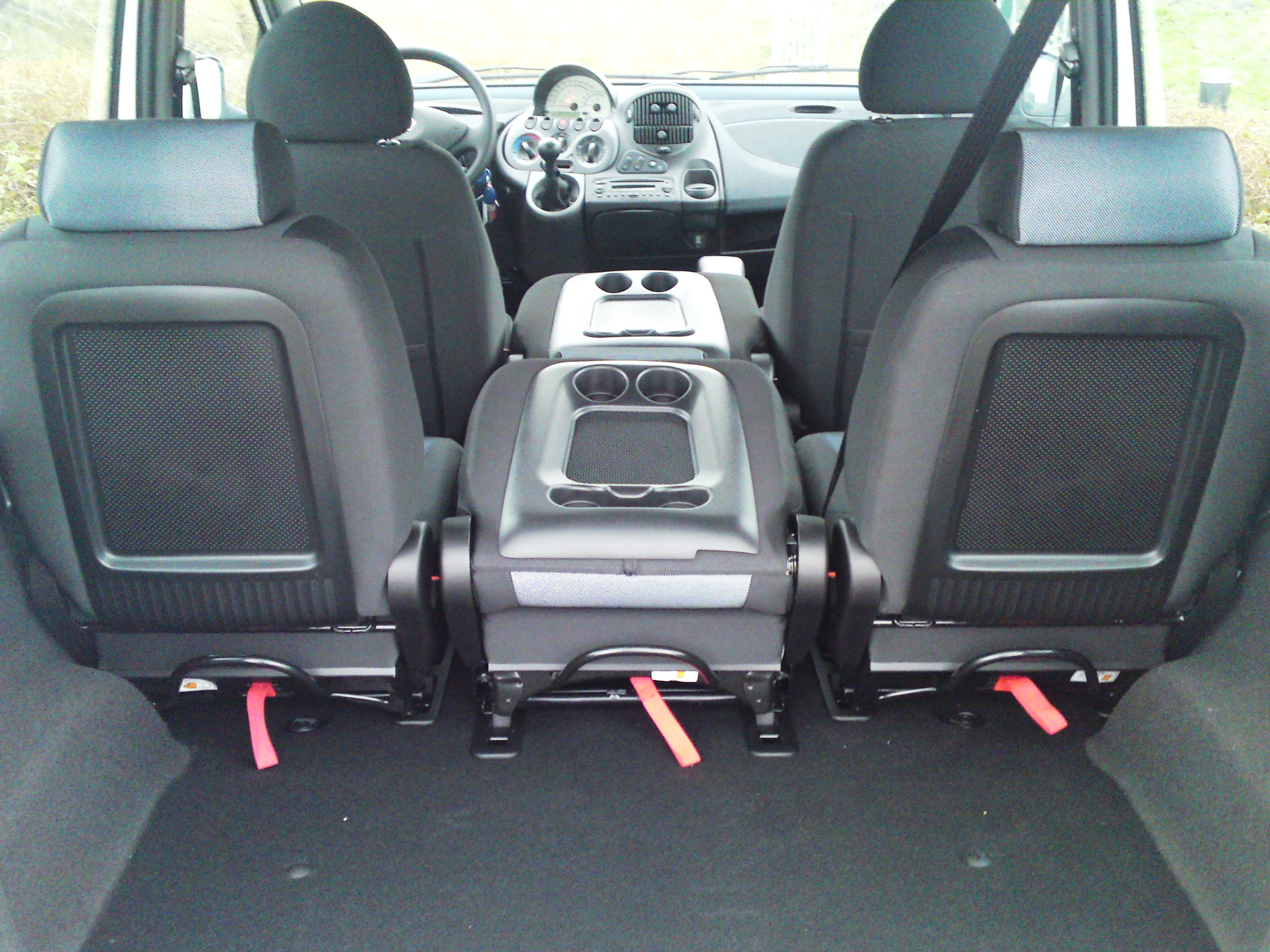
Fiat Multipla with flexible 3+3 seating

The flexibility of the interior seating is a common theme amongst compact MPVs. Many models have seats that can be individually folded or easily removed, and the upright seating positions maximises use of the interior space. The seating arrangement is usually either two rows (for a total of five seats) or three rows (for a total of seven seats), with the second row having three seats and the other row(s) having two seats.

Some compact MPVs also have three seats in both the front and rear rows, and are therefore referred to as six-seaters.

Where a third row of seats is present, the seats are often smaller and intended for children or short distance travel only. In some cars, these seats can only carry a limited weight (less than an adult's weight). The third row of seating is usually optional, and is not available on all models of compact MPVs.

Most compact MPVs do not have sliding doors as compared to the large-sized Multi-purpose vehicle, being more similar to the older (and concurrent) station wagons.

== History ==
Predecessors to the compact MPV segment are the 1977 AMC Concept 80 AM Van, the 1978 Lancia Megagamma and the 1982 Lada X-1 concept cars.

Early production models of compact MPVs include, the 1982 Nissan Prairie and the 1991 Mitsubishi RVR (marketed as "Space Runner" in Europe and "Expo LRV" in the United States). Others include the "well-reviewed but slow-selling" 1984–87 Honda Civic Wagon and the 1982-1988 Tercel Wagon. The Nissan Axxess had limited space behind its second row seats, but featured rear sliding doors on both sides making it like a minivan that was "shrunk in the dryer." Although not classified at the time as MPVs, but variously described as space-efficient small people movers, functional high station wagons, or small vans. Examples of models – that consumers in the U.S. seemed to avoid because of "resistance to obvious utility" – include the "mini-minivan" 3-door hatchback wagons with a sliding side door on only the passenger side that were marketed as the Eagle Summit Wagon, Mitsubishi Expo, and Plymouth Colt Vista.

Some claim that the 1996 Renault Scénic is credited with creating the compact MPV segment.

The 1999 Opel/Vauxhall/Chevrolet Zafira was the first compact MPV with seven seats.

== Models ==
The five highest selling compact MPVs in Europe in 2018 were the Renault Scénic, Volkswagen Touran, Citroën C4 Picasso, BMW 2 Series Active Tourer / Gran Tourer and Mercedes-Benz B-Class.
