= Eagle Vista =

Subcompact car by Eagle (1988-1992)

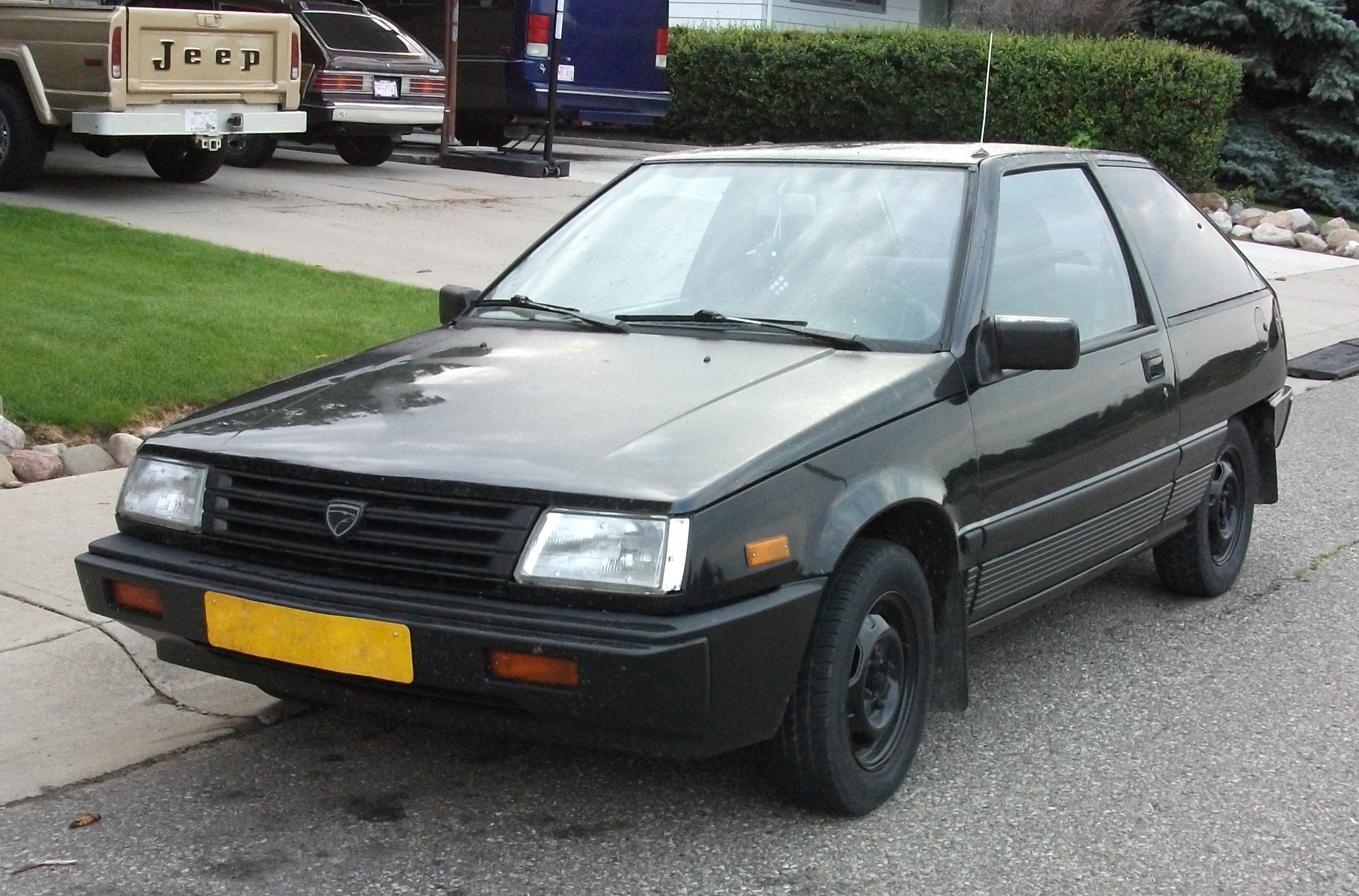

Overview
- Manufacturer: Mitsubishi Motors for Eagle
- Production: 1988–1992
- Assembly: Japan: Kurashiki, Okayama; Thailand: Laem Chabang (MMTh)

Body and chassis
- Class: Subcompact
- Body style: 4-door sedan 3-door hatchback 4-door station wagon
- Layout: Front engine, front-wheel drive / four-wheel drive
- Related: Dodge Colt; Plymouth Colt; Mitsubishi Mirage; Mitsubishi Lancer; Proton Saga

Powertrain
- Engine: 1.5L 4G15 I4; 1.6L 4G32 I4 (hatchback/sedan); 2.0L 4G63 I4 (station wagon)
- Transmission: 4-speed manual 5-speed manual 3-speed automatic

Dimensions
- Wheelbase: 93.7 in (2,380 mm)
- Length: Hatchback: 157.3 in (3,995 mm); Sedan: 169.1 in (4,295 mm)
- Width: 63.8 in (1,621 mm)
- Height: 53.5 in (1,359 mm)

Chronology
- Predecessor: Renault Alliance/Encore
- Successor: Eagle Summit

The Eagle Vista name has been used on two subcompact cars sold from 1988 to 1992 in Canada. Along with the Eagle Summit, the car replaced the Renault Alliance/Encore because of Renault's withdrawing from the United States and Canada at that time. It was a rebadged version of the second generation Mitsubishi Mirage (station wagons were rebadged Mitsubishi Space Wagons). The Vista hatchback and sedans were available with either a 1.5 L 4G15 straight-4 (69 hp or 51 kW), or a 1.6L turbocharged 4G32 (106 hp or 79 kW), and was available with either a 4 or 5-speed manual or a 3-speed automatic transmission. The turbo hatchback came in the GT equipment level, turbo sedans were called LX and carried taller gearing. Turbos were not available with the 4-speed transmission. Hatchbacks and sedans were replaced by the Eagle Summit. Top speeds (with manual transmissions) were 155 km/h (96 mph) or 187 km/h (116 mph) respectively for the naturally aspirated and turbocharged versions.

== Vista Wagon ==
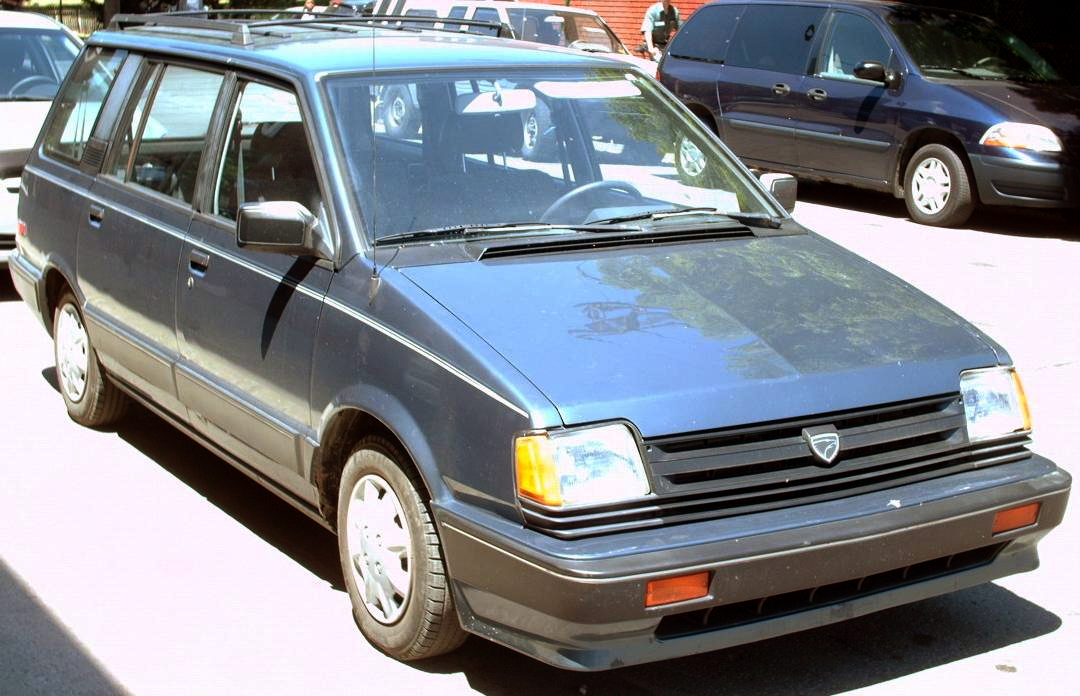
Eagle Vista Wagon

The station wagon was available with a SOHC 4G63 2.0L inline four, with either a 5-speed manual transmission (available only on the 4WD version) or a 3-speed automatic. The Eagle Vista was discontinued in 1992, with the wagon replaced by the Eagle Summit minivan (based on the Mitsubishi RVR).

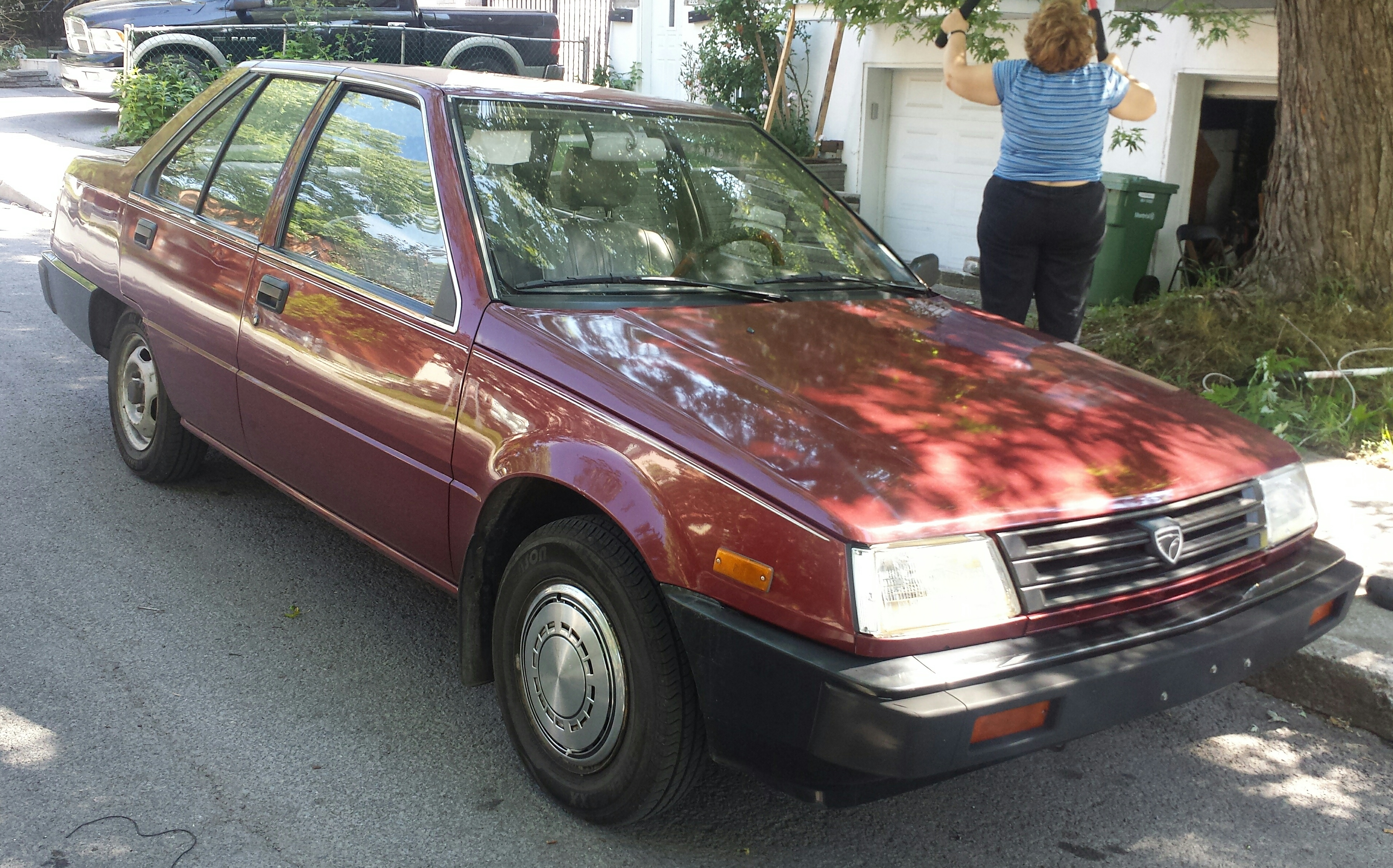
Eagle Vista Sedan
