= Mitsubishi Space Star =

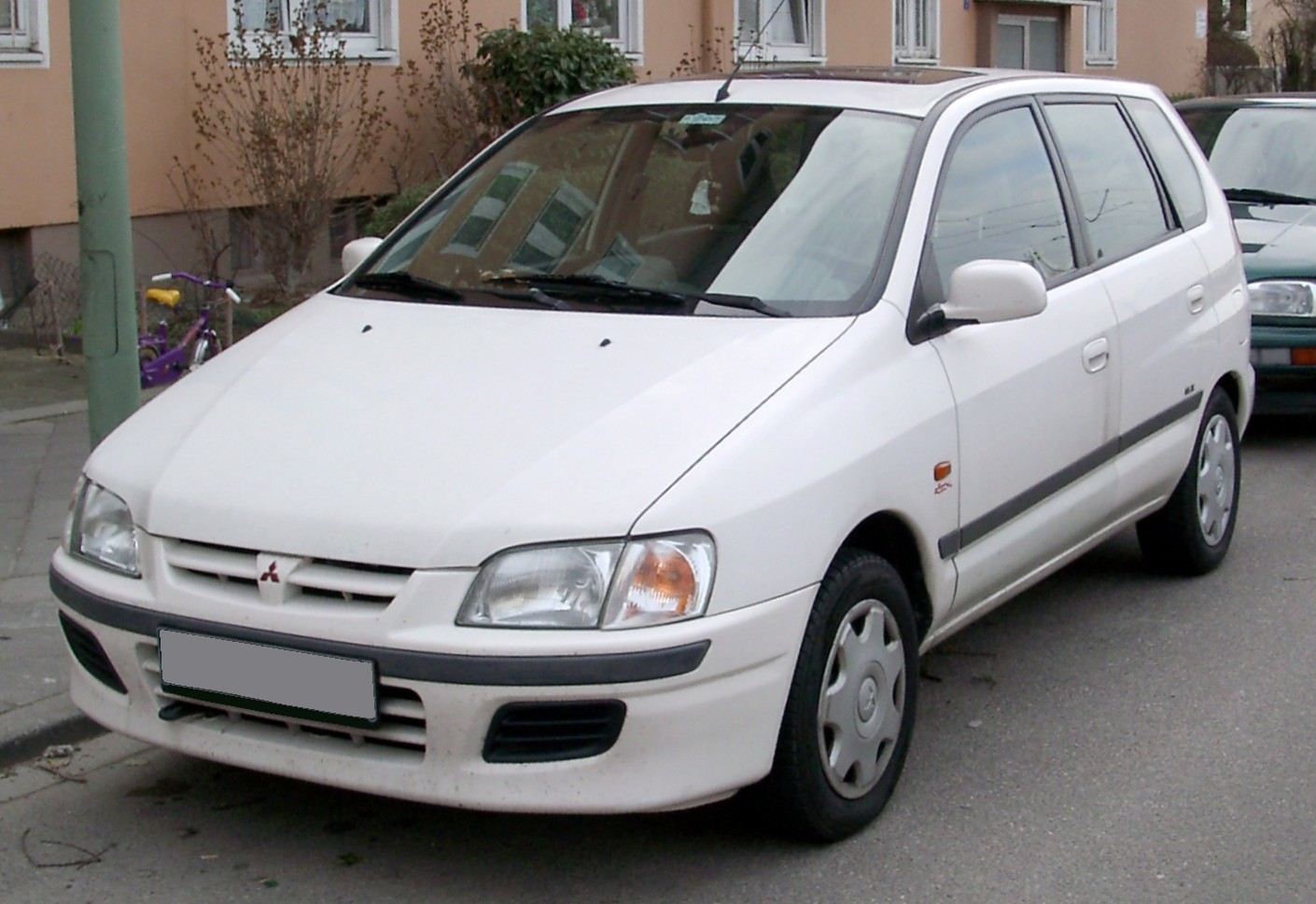
- Mitsubishi Space Star (pre-facelift)

Overview
- Manufacturer: Mitsubishi Motors
- Production: 1998–2005
- Assembly: Born, Netherlands (NedCar)

Body and chassis
- Class: Mini MPV (M)
- Body style: 5-door hatchback
- Layout: Front-engine, front-wheel-drive
- Related: Mitsubishi Carisma; Mitsubishi RVR

Powertrain
- Engine: 1.3 L 4G13 I4; 1.6 L 4G92 I4; 1.8 L 4G93 I4; 1.8 L 4G93 GDI I4; 1.9 L Renault F9Q DI-D I4
- Transmission: 5-speed manual 4-speed automatic

Dimensions
- Wheelbase: 2,500 mm (98.4 in)
- Length: 4,030 mm (158.7 in) (1998–2002); 4,050 mm (159.4 in) (2002–2005)
- Width: 1,715 mm (67.5 in)
- Height: 1,515 mm (59.6 in)
- Curb weight: 1,160 kg (2,557 lb)

Chronology
- Successor: Mitsubishi Colt (Z30)

The Mitsubishi Space Star is a car produced by the Japanese manufacturer Mitsubishi Motors from mid-1998 until the end of 2005. Described as a hatchback, a compact people carrier, or a micro MPV, it was built at the NedCar factory in the Netherlands and was primarily sold in the European markets. In 2013, Mitsubishi began selling the sixth generation Mirage supermini under the Space Star name in parts of Europe, owing to legal rights relating to the use of the Mirage nameplate.

== Overview ==
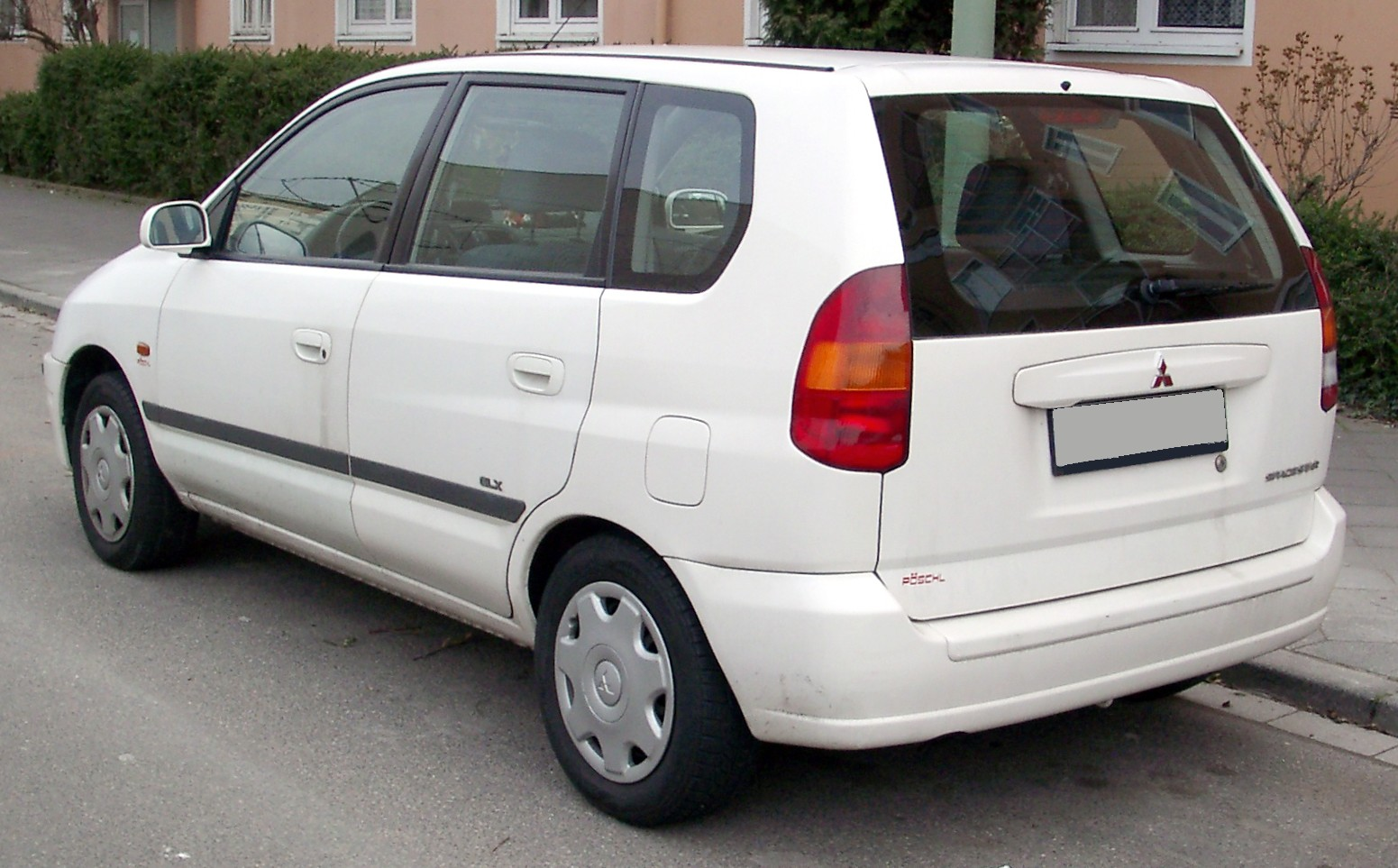
Mitsubishi Space Star (pre-facelift)

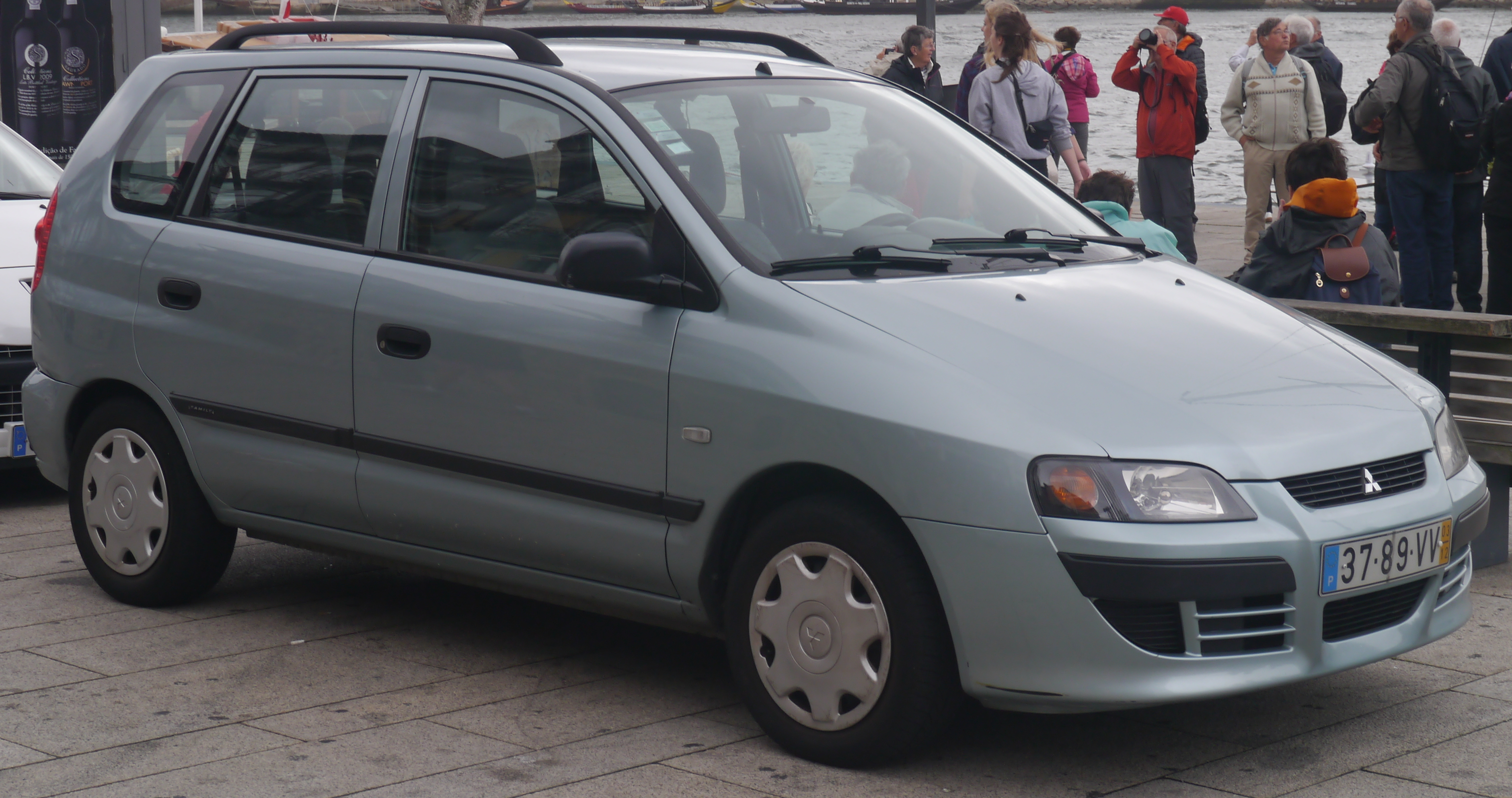

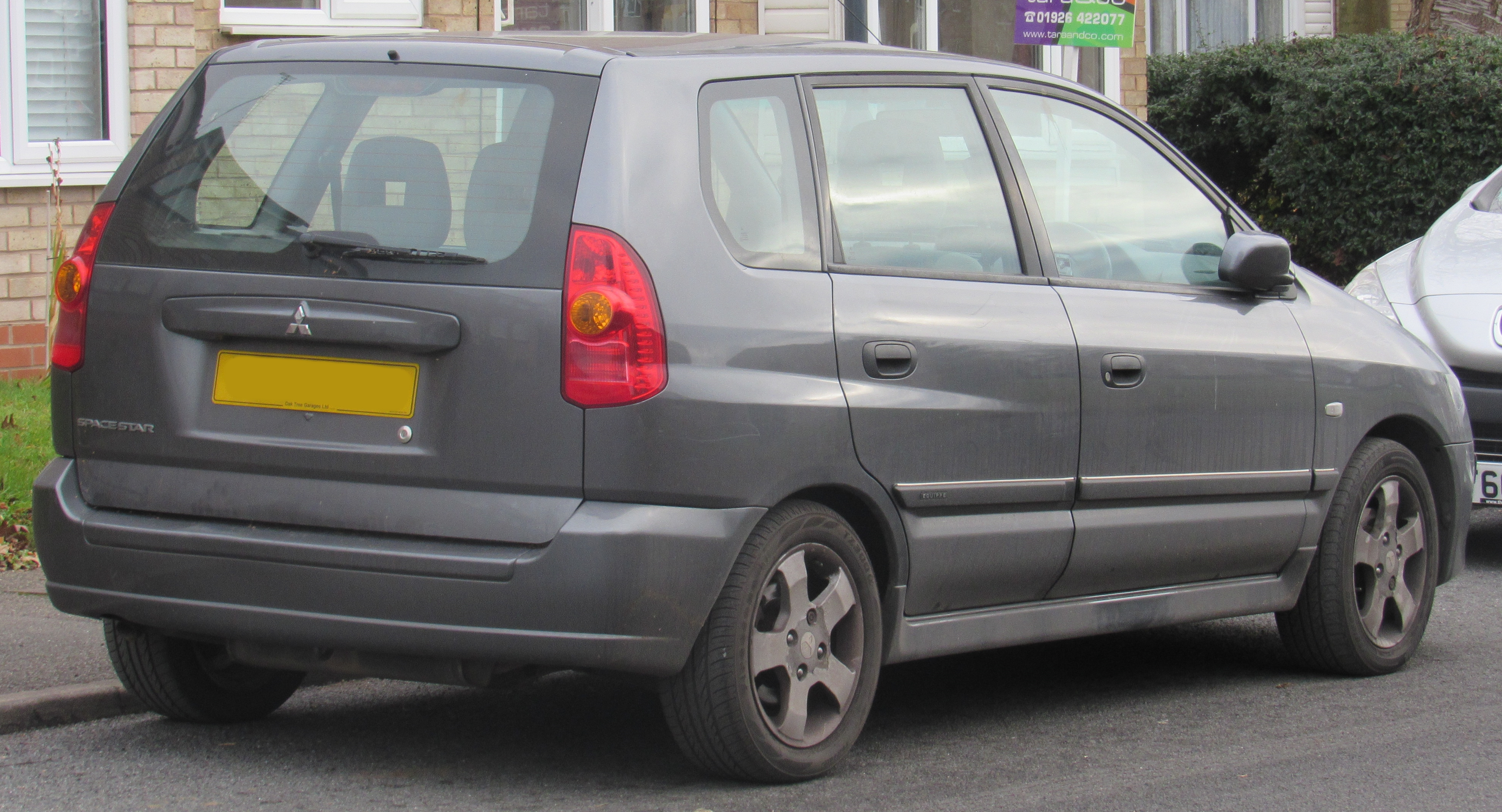
Mitsubishi Space Star (facelift)

The Space Star shared its platform with the Mitsubishi Carisma and Volvo S40/V40. It was first introduced to the market in the autumn of 1998, replacing the Mitsubishi Space Runner. Production of the Space Star stopped in 2005. Since the car's introduction to the market its visual appearance stayed almost identical and it only received a minor facelift in 2002. In 2001, the Space Star was crash tested by Euro NCAP and received a three-star rating for the safety of its adult passengers, and a two-star rating for the safety of pedestrians.

The base Space Stars were equipped with 1.3-litre petrol engines with a maximum output of 80–84 horsepower (60–63 kW). The other petrol-powered engines were a 1.6-litre with 97 hp (72 kW) and a 1.8-litre with 112 hp (84 kW). A model equipped with a 1.8-litre GDI engine with 121 hp (90 kW) was available until the facelift in 2002. Diesel engines were the 1.9 L DI-D with 101 hp (75 kW), introduced with the 2002 facelift, and the 1.9 L DI-D S version with 115 hp (86 kW), released in 2003. All engines are straight-4 engines.

== Nameplate reintroduction ==
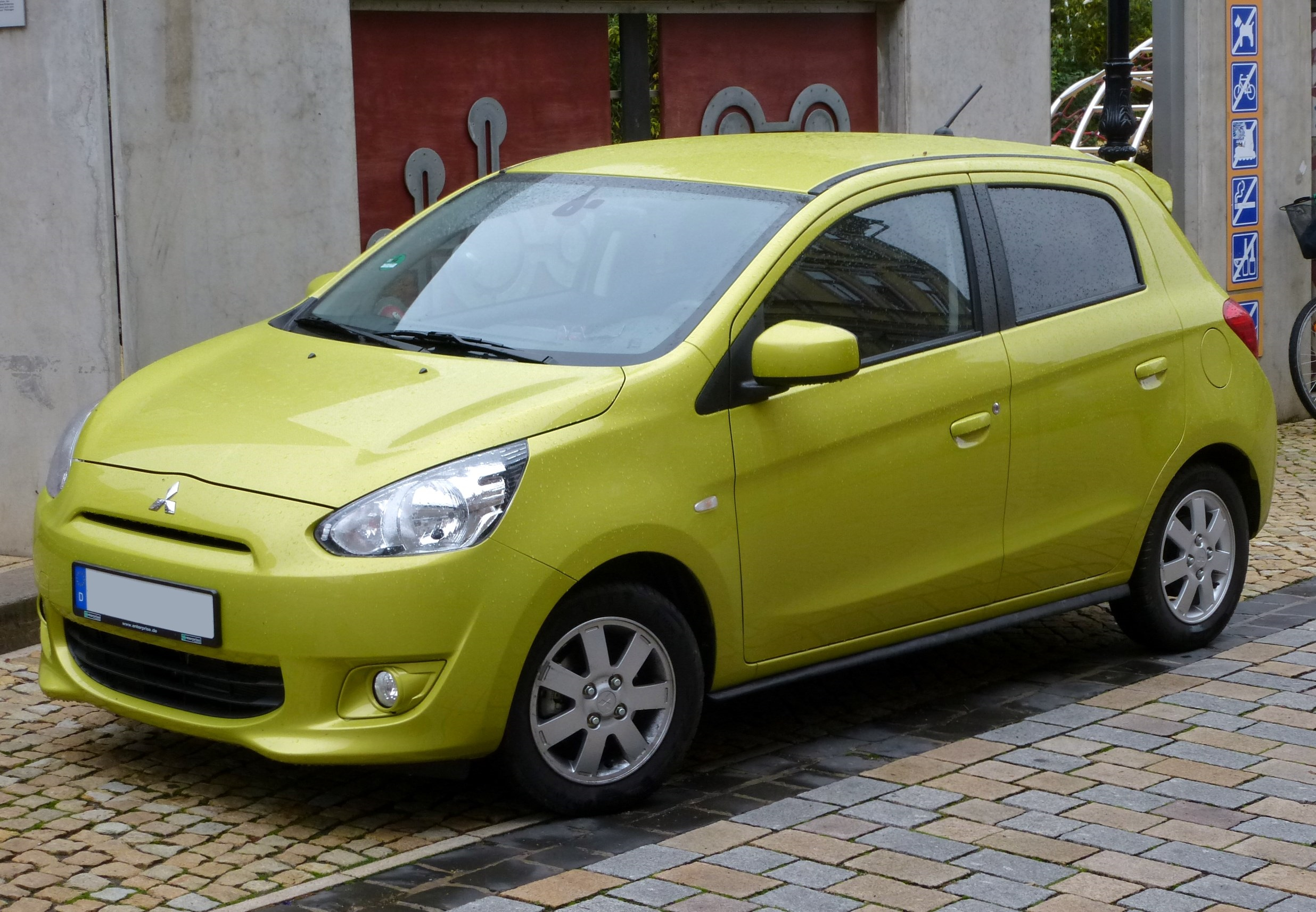
Mitsubishi Mirage hatchback, marketed in some parts of Europe and Singapore as the Mitsubishi Space Star

The sixth generation Mitsubishi Mirage hatchback, released in 2012, is rebadged as the Mitsubishi Space Star in the Singaporean and European markets. It is a supermini car, in five-door hatchback body style, powered by a three-cylinder petrol engine.

== Production and sales figures ==
| Year | Production | Sales |
|---|---|---|
| 1998 | 13,645 | n/a |
| 1999 | 58,871 | n/a |
| 2000 | 30,116 | 38,164 |
| 2001 | 44,908 | 42,987 |
| 2002 | 46,824 | 44,957 |
| 2003 | 57,090 | 42,392 |
| 2004 | 24,315 | 30,584 |
| 2005 | - | 10,193 |
| 2006 | - | 612 |

(Production, sales sources: Facts & Figures 2000, Facts & Figures 2005, Facts & Figures 2007, Mitsubishi Motors website)
