= Eagle Summit =

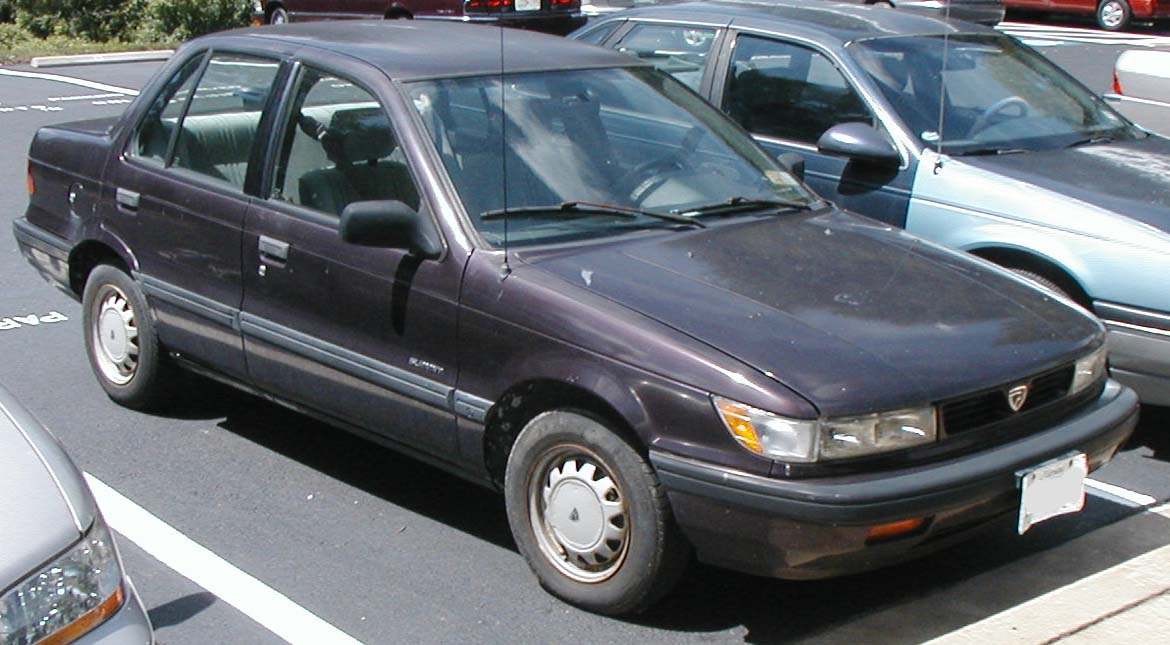

Overview
- Manufacturer: Mitsubishi Motors
- Production: 1989–1996

Body and chassis
- Class: Subcompact; Compact MPV (wagon)

Chronology
- Predecessor: Renault Encore (for 3-door hatchback); Renault Alliance (for coupe & sedan)
- Successor: Plymouth Neon (coupe and sedan); Chrysler PT Cruiser (hatchback and wagon)

The Eagle Summit is a line of subcompact cars produced for two generations by Mitsubishi and sold by Eagle from 1989 until 1996. It was marketed as a captive import by the Jeep-Eagle sales division that was established after Chrysler Corporation purchased American Motors Corporation (AMC) in 1987.

== Overview ==
Use of the Eagle model name originated with the innovative all-wheel-drive AMC Eagle introduced for the 1980 model year. Production continued even after Chrysler purchased AMC, but both the AMC brand and the original Eagle line were discontinued after 1988. The replacements were "badge-engineered products designed, Chrysler said, to compete with hot-selling import cars."

The Eagle Summit joined the Dodge Colt and Plymouth Colt starting in 1989 as Chrysler wound down the assembly of the subcompact Plymouth Horizon and Dodge Omni twins. The introduction of the Summit coincided with the release of the Mitsubishi Mirage's third generation.

The Eagle Summit was positioned as a subcompact automobile model in the product mix for Jeep-Eagle dealers. Previously, this position was held by the Renault Alliance until it was discontinued following Chrysler's acquisition of AMC from Renault in 1987.

The Eagle Summit line continued through the extent of the Mirage's fourth generation, which ended in 1996. The somewhat related Eagle Summit Wagon (a compact MPV) was marketed from 1992 through 1996 and was based on the Mitsubishi RVR.

The Chrysler Neon was introduced in January 1994 and distributed through Dodge and Plymouth dealers. Chrysler officials declared that an Eagle version of the Neon was not planned. This decision meant that Eagle dealers had no competitor to the Neon and, combined with the Summit's Mitsubishi heritage, made the Eagle line expendable.

== Year-to-year changes ==
=== First generation (1989–1992) ===
First generation
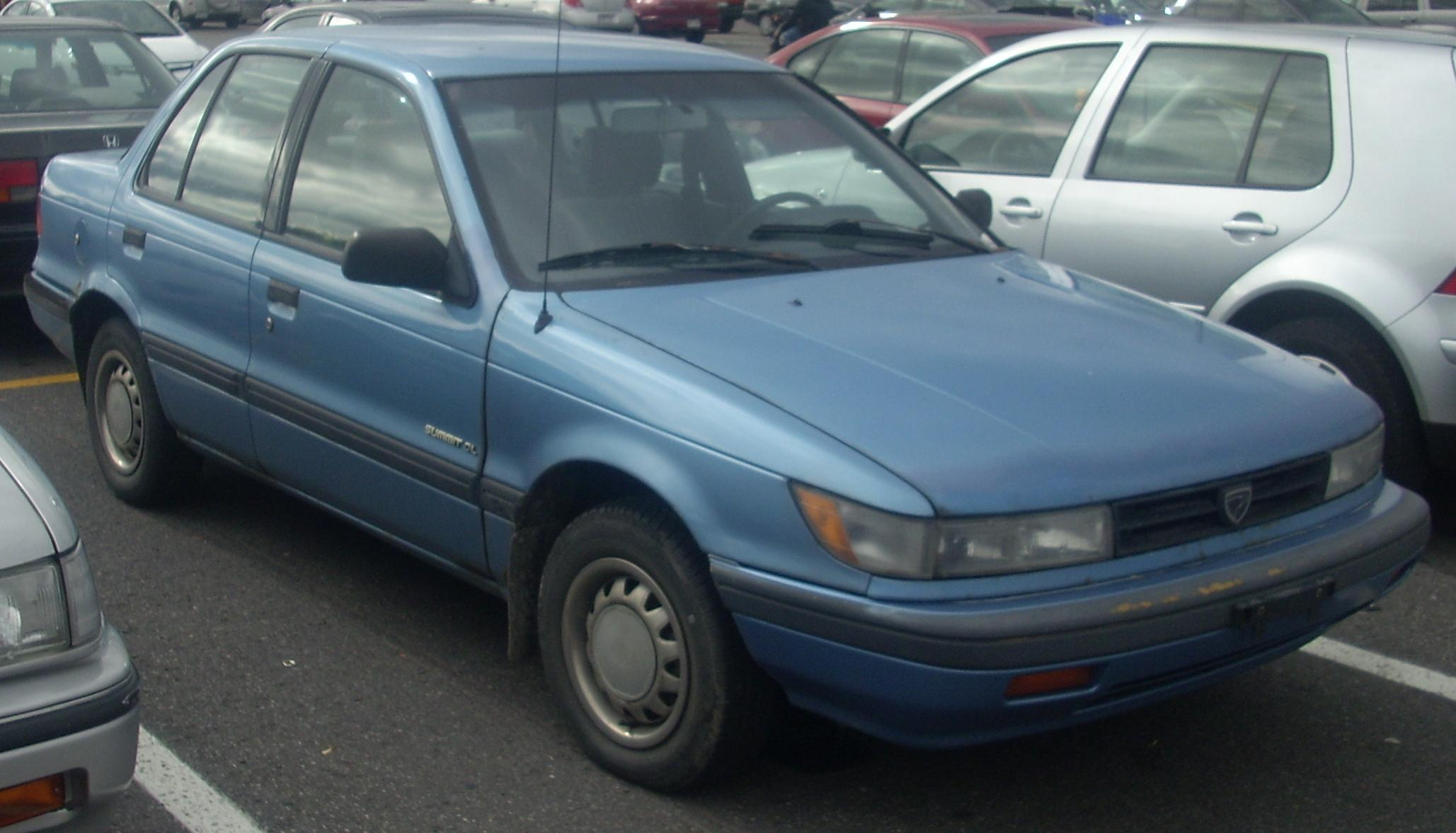

Overview
- Production: 1989–1992
- Assembly: Japan: Kurashiki, Okayama; United States: Normal, Illinois (Diamond-Star Motors)

Body and chassis
- Body style: 4-door sedan; 3-door hatchback; 4-door wagon
- Layout: FF layout
- Related: Mitsubishi Lancer; Mitsubishi Mirage; Dodge/Plymouth Colt; Mitsubishi Space Wagon

Powertrain
- Engine: 1,468 cc 4G15 SOHC 8V/12V I4; 1,595 cc 4G61 DOHC 16V I4
- Transmission: 3-speed automatic; 4-speed automatic 4-speed manual; 5-speed manual

Dimensions
- Wheelbase: 93.9 in (2,385 mm) (sedan); 93.9 in (2,385 mm) (hatchback)
- Length: 170.1 in (4,321 mm) (sedan); 158.7 in (4,031 mm) (hatchback)
- Width: 65.7 in (1,669 mm)
- Height: 52.8 in (1,341 mm) (sedan); 51.9 in (1,318 mm) (hatchback)
- Curb weight: 2,271 lb (1,030 kg) (sedan); 2,205 lb (1,000 kg) (hatchback)

The Summit was a badge engineered version of the Mitsubishi Mirage. In a pairing of the Japanese-built Mitsubishi Mirage and the identical Eagle Summit to test if Lee Iacocca's theory was true regarding the preference of a Japanese to an American brand on similar cars, Popular Mechanics found that American consumers were "not sold on Japanese cars. Quite the opposite. They want to "Buy American," but the Japanese manufacturers seem to offer more of the type of cars Americans need and at a better price, and from more cooperative dealers." The Summit was originally manufactured in Japan. Starting with the 1991 model year, the Eagle Summits were also built by Diamond-Star Motors (DSM), a joint-venture between Chrysler and Mitsubishi, in Normal, Illinois.

1989: Summit was introduced as a sedan in DL and LX trim, both powered by a 1.5-liter 8-valve four-cylinder engine with 81 hp (60 kW). The LX could have a 1.6-liter 16-valve DOHC engine with 123 hp (92 kW). The 100.7 cubic feet (2.85 m^{3}) of interior volume classified the Summit into the compact car class, while most of its competitors were still subcompacts. The Summit was also noted for its generous rear legroom. Sales started in August 1988.

1990: A low-cost base model was added to the bottom of the Summit line. Added to the top was a new ES, which paired the 1.6-liter engine with a sport suspension, 4-wheel-disc brakes, and 14-inch alloy wheels with P195/60R14 tires. All models received all-capital lettering on the back.

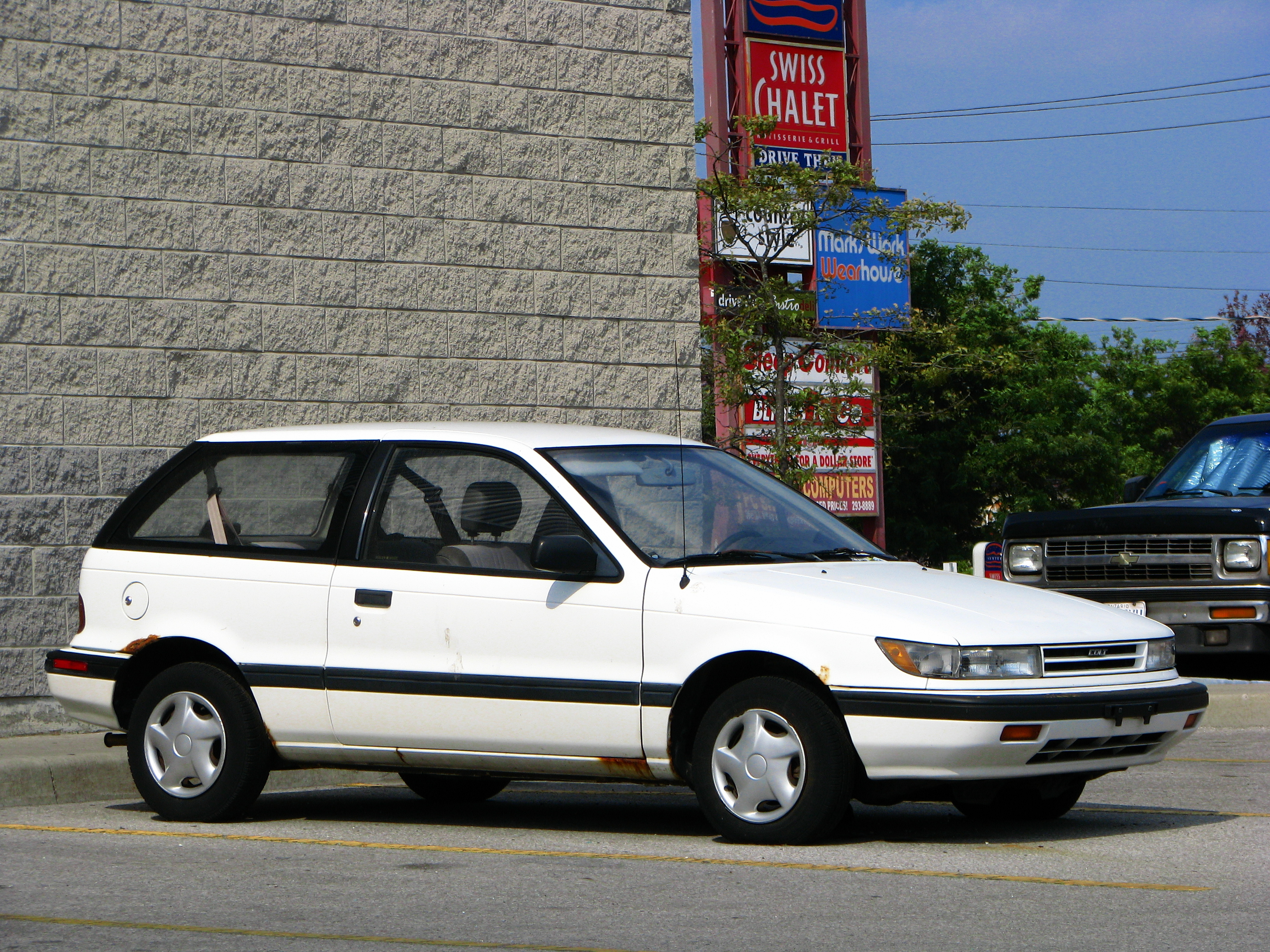
Hatchback (related Dodge Colt)

1991: The 1.5-liter engine output increased to 92 hp (69 kW; 93 PS) due to 4 additional valves (three per cylinder, for 12 total). The ES models returned to 13-inch wheels and disc brakes on only the front. New was the two-door Summit hatchback; both it and the sedan was available in base and ES trims. The manual transmission was a 4-speed on the base hatchback and a 5-speed on all others; the automatic was a 3-speed on hatchbacks and a 4-speed on sedans. All models featured a new front grille.

1992: The larger Summit Wagon joined the line, and it was a completely different vehicle featuring a high roofline and sliding rear side door. This "crossover" design was actually a rebadged Mitsubishi RVR, thus not related to the Mirage-based Summits. The Wagon was available in DL and LX trims, as well as in a four-wheel drive (AWD) version. The new Summit Wagon was marketed as blending the maneuverability of a small car with the roominess of a minivan with its interior offering high seating positions and removable rear seats. It was designed to attract young families with seating for five.

Production Figures:

Eagle Summit Production Figures
	Sedan	Hatchback	Yearly Total
1989	27,213	-	27,213
1990	13,772	-	13,772
1991	9,257	8,363	17,620
1992	3,348	6,881	10,229
Total	53,590	15,244	68,834

=== Second generation (1993–1996) ===
Second generation
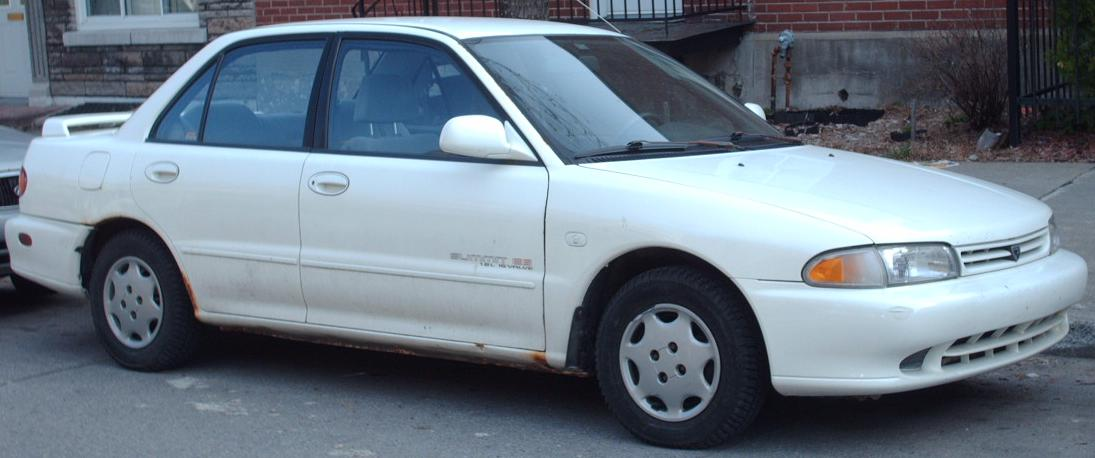

Overview
- Also called: Mitsubishi Space Runner (Europe, Wagon); Mitsubishi RVR; Proton Putra (Malaysia, Coupe)
- Production: 1993–1996
- Assembly: Japan: Kurashiki, Okayama (coupé & sedan)

Body and chassis
- Body style: 4-door sedan; 2-door coupe; 4-door wagon
- Layout: Front engine, front-wheel drive
- Related: Mitsubishi Mirage; Dodge/Plymouth Colt

Powertrain
- Engine: 1.5 L 4G15 I4; 1.8 L 4G93 I4
- Transmission: 5-speed manual; 3/4-speed automatic

Dimensions
- Wheelbase: Coupe: 96.1 in (2,441 mm); Sedan: 98.4 in (2,499 mm); Wagon: 99.2 in (2,520 mm)
- Length: Sedan: 174.0 in (4,420 mm); Wagon: 168.5 in (4,280 mm)
- Width: 1993-94: 66.5 in (1,689 mm); 1995-96: 66.1 in (1,679 mm)
- Height: 51.4 in (1,306 mm); 1995-96 Coupe: 51.6 in (1,311 mm)
- Curb weight: Wagon: 2,700 lb (1,225 kg)

The 1993 model year Summits were completely new and featured more room on the inside as well as weighing less than before. The Summit was now based the fourth generation Mitsubishi Mirage 'CC' chassis platform featuring a multilink rear suspension and the body was given a rounder shape.

The hatchback body design was dropped in favor of a two-door coupe version, while a four-door sedan joined the Summit lineup.

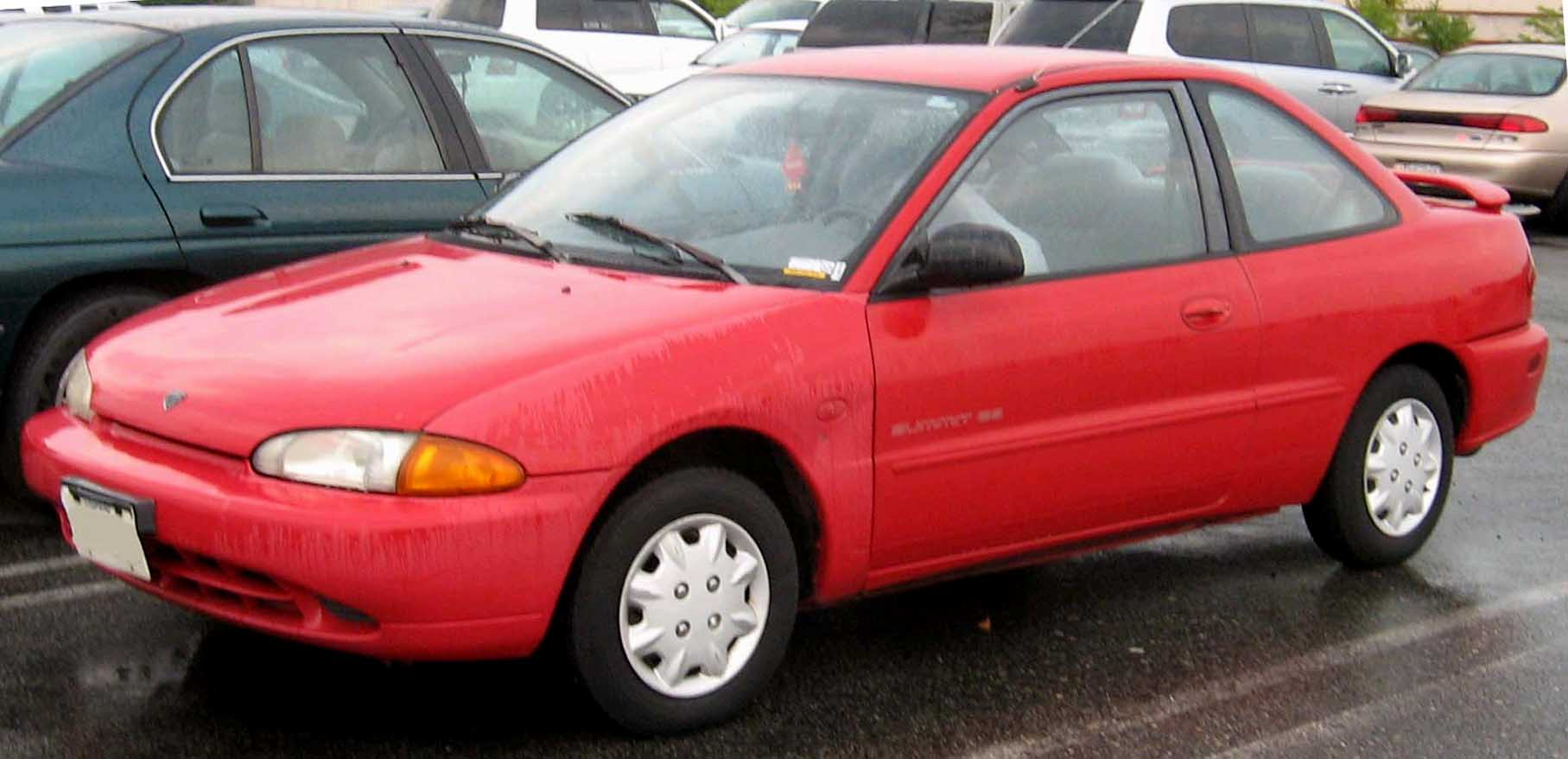
Eagle Summit coupe

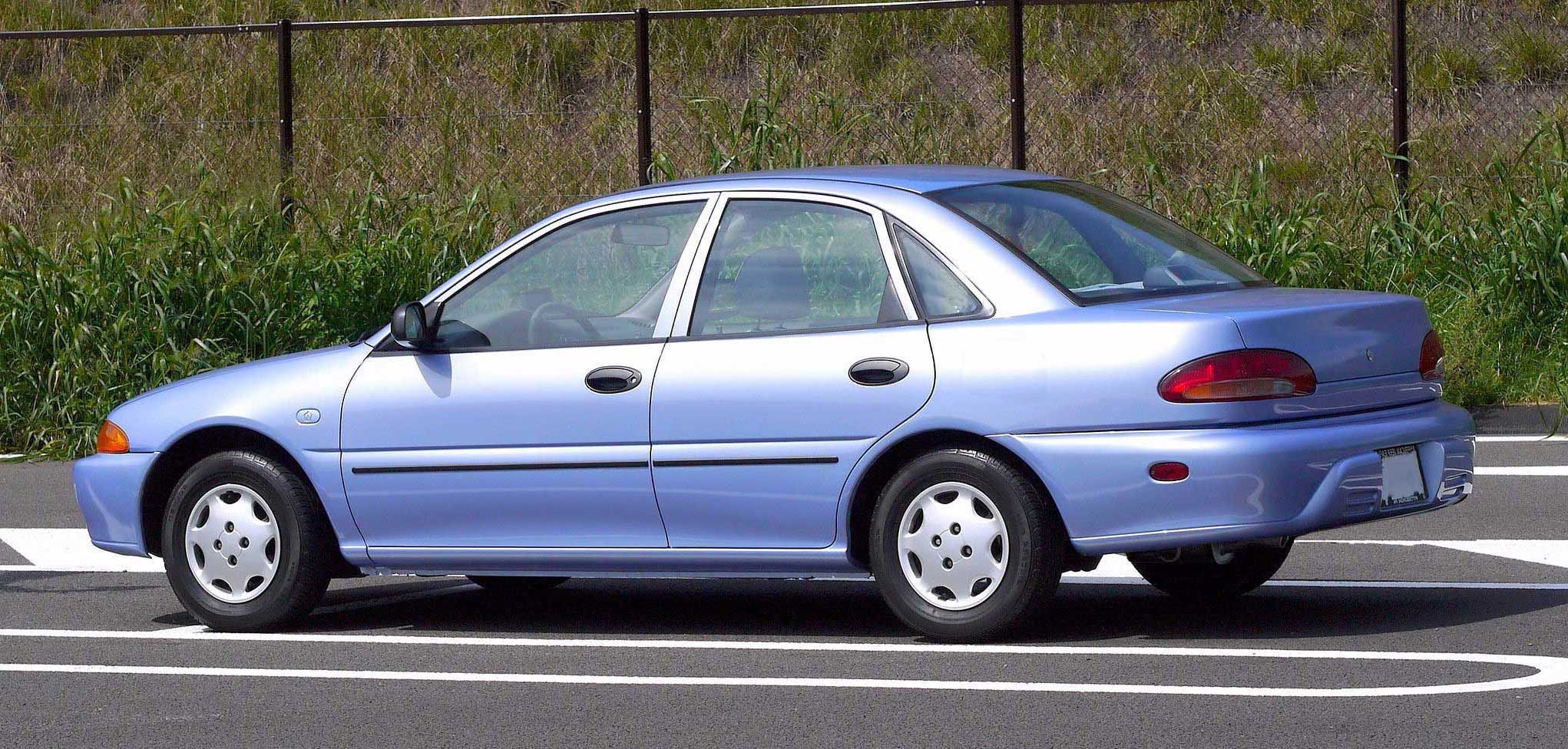
Eagle Summit Sedan (U.S.)

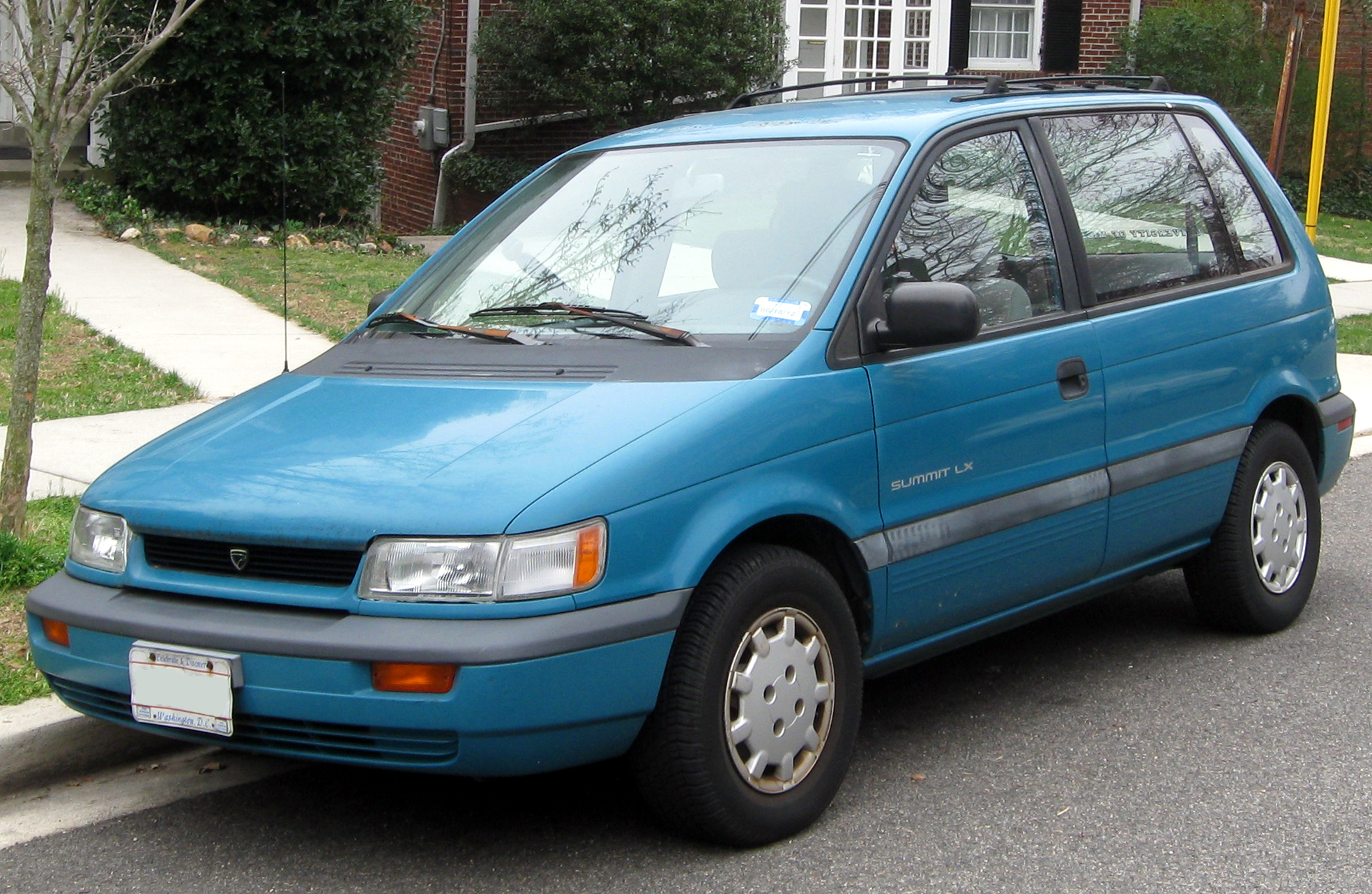
Eagle Summit Wagon

The Summit Wagon, a rebadged Mitsubishi RVR was classified as a compact minivan, or a compact MPV.

1993: As with the Mirage and both Colts, the base 1.5-liter engine remained, paired to a 5-speed manual or 3-speed automatic. The 1.5 produces 113 hp (84 kW; 115 PS). New was a 113 hp (84 kW; 115 PS) 1.8-liter SOHC engine, with which the optional automatic transmission was a 4-speed unit. The Summit was offered in sedan and coupe body styles, in both DL and ES trim lines. The RVR-based minivan version, marketed as the Summit Wagon, replaced the Canada-only Eagle Vista wagon.

1994: All Summits featured a driver's side airbag, replacing one of the motorized seatbelts. The lower-end DL sedan was rebadged LX and inherited the 1.8-liter engine, which was now an option for the ES coupe as well. The ES sedan upgraded to larger 14-inch (360 mm) wheels.

1995: A passenger's side airbag on all Summits replaced the other motorized seatbelt, and ES models were renamed ESi. More significantly, the 1994 demise of both Colts left the Summit as the only remaining Mirage clone, and the cancellation of the Mirage sedan at the end of 1994 left the Summit as the only four-door offering.

1996: Summit models entered its last model year with new paint colors and seat fabrics.

== Trim levels overview ==
4-door sedan (1989–1996)
- DL - 1989–1990; 1993
- LX - 1989–1990; 1994–1996
- base - 1990–1992
- ES - 1990–1994
- ESi - 1994–1996

2-door coupe/hatchback (1991–1996)
- base - 1991–1992
- ES - 1991–1994
- DL - 1993–1996
- ESi - 1994–1996
