= Lada X-1 =

The Lada X-1 was a concept car designed by Lada in 1981. It can be seen as the forerunner of modern MPVs. The shape was very aerodynamic and like the later Fiat Multipla it also had the headlights up by the windscreen.

The length of the car was 4.2 meters (slightly longer than the Volkswagen Golf Mk2) and not much higher than an ordinary station wagon. It was possible to move around and turn the chairs.
