= Mitsubishi RVR =

Motor vehicle by Mitsubishi Motors

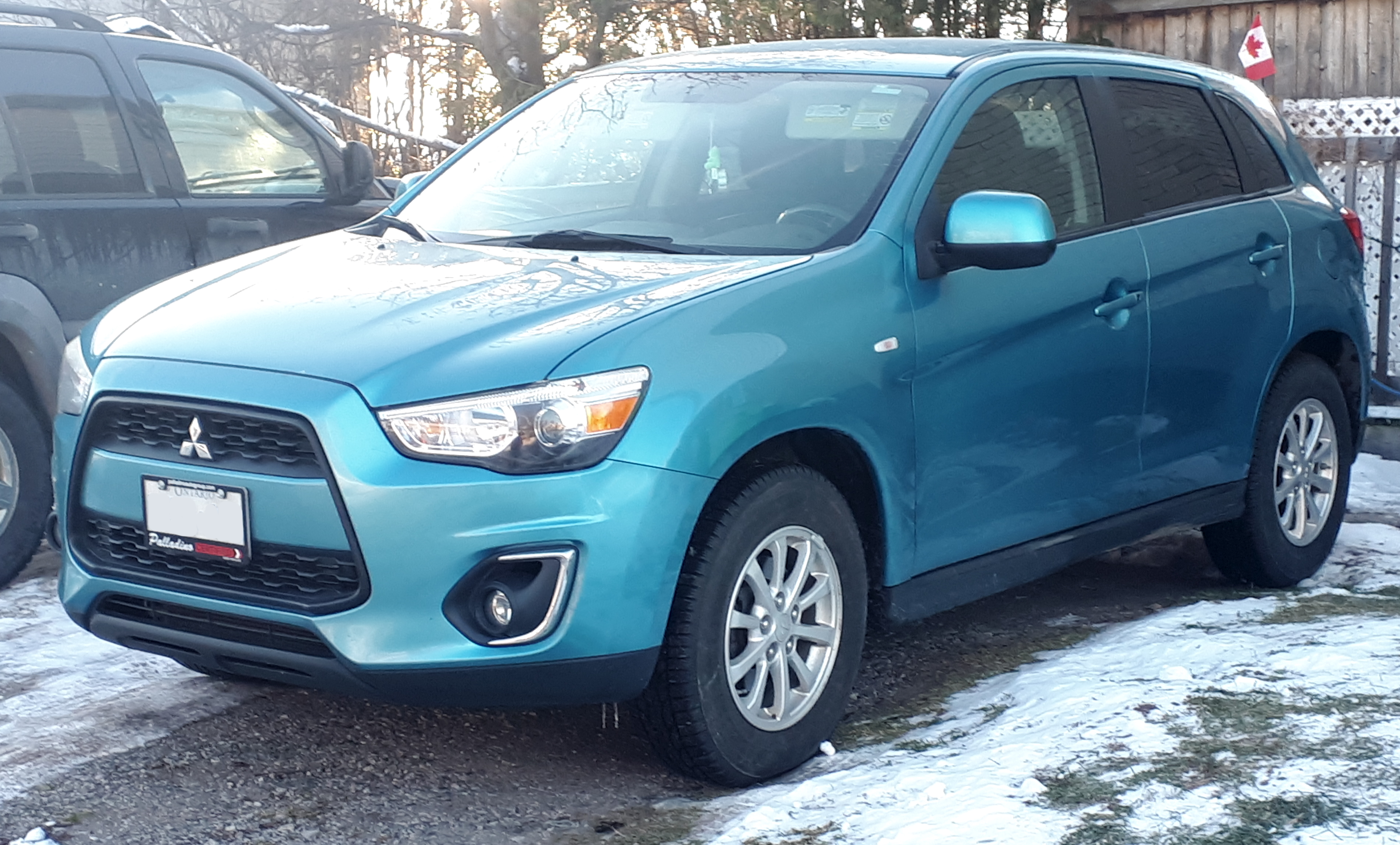
- Mitsubishi RVR (third generation)

Overview
- Manufacturer: Mitsubishi Motors
- Production: 1991–2002; 2010–2024

Body and chassis
- Class: Compact MPV (1991–2002); Subcompact SUV (2010–2024)
- Body style: 4-door wagon (1991–2002); 5-door wagon (1997–2002); 5-door crossover SUV (2010–2024)

The Mitsubishi RVR is a range of cars produced by Japanese manufacturer Mitsubishi Motors from 1991 to 2002 and then from 2010 to present. The first two generations were classified as compact multi-purpose vehicles (MPV), and the model introduced in 2010 is a subcompact SUV.

The RVR was Mitsubishi's Recreational Vehicle debut during the Japanese economic boom. The cars were sold at the Mitsubishi Japan dealership chain called Car Plaza. RVR is an acronym for "Recreation Vehicle Runner". In addition, the original logo had a Cyrillic Я on the first letter, so that it reads ЯVR. It had a convenient size passenger cabin and spacious 4–5 person capacity with a youth-oriented approach, making it appealing to young people. Television commercials in Japan used Bugs Bunny and Daffy Duck as spokespeople. It was also developed and released during Japan's "bubble economy", and gained popularity due to the convenience of a passenger side sliding door.

It was a tall wagon with some off-road characteristics, targeting the "sports gear" or outdoor lifestyle market. This approach was similar to the one used by Honda when they introduced the Honda CR-V. The RVR had an especially good sales record in the beginning, even with the decline of the RV sales boom. Sales later declined, and the original RVR was discontinued in August 2002.

The reintroduction of the "Sports Gear" RVR nameplate is an attempt to inherit the popularity of the first generation vehicle. It was released in Japan on 17 February 2010. It does not feature a rear sliding door, due to the current perception that SUVs have conventional doors, and sliding doors are typically installed on family vehicles. The RVR logo no longer uses the inverted Cyrillic "Я" on the first letter.

== First generation (N10/N20; 1991) ==
First generation (N10/N20)
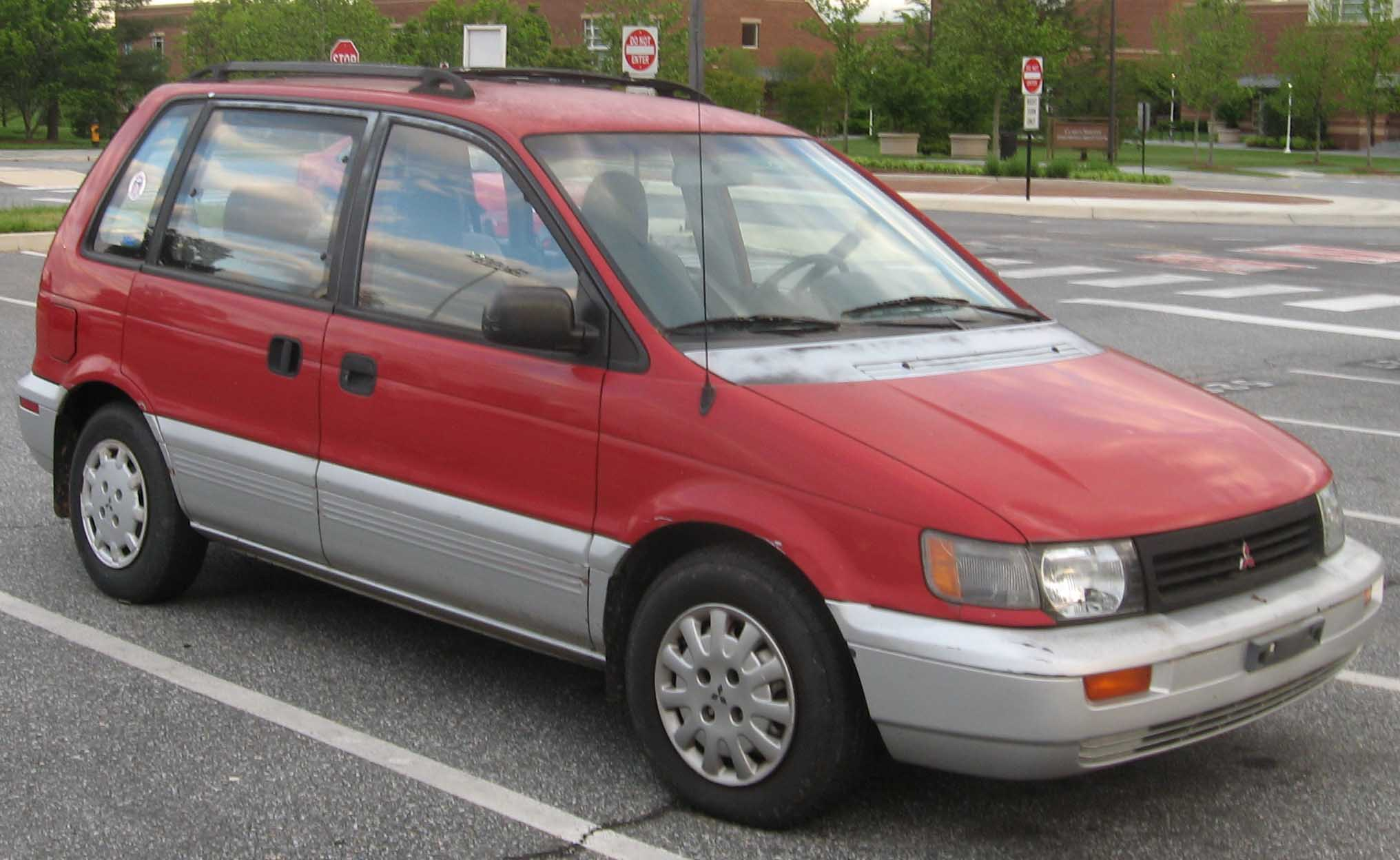

Overview
- Also called: Mitsubishi Space Runner; Mitsubishi Expo LRV; Dodge Colt Wagon; Eagle Summit Wagon; Plymouth Colt Vista Wagon
- Production: 1991–1997
- Assembly: Nagoya Plant, Okazaki, Aichi Japan

Body and chassis
- Class: Compact MPV
- Body style: 4-door wagon
- Layout: Front-engine, front-wheel-drive or four-wheel-drive
- Related: Mitsubishi Chariot; Mitsubishi Galant

Powertrain
- Engine: Petrol: 1834 cc 4G93 16V I4; 1997 cc 4G63 16V DOHC I4; 1997 cc 4G63T 16V turbo DOHC I4; 2351 cc 4G64 16V I4 (North America); Diesel: 1796 cc 4D65 turbo I4; 1998 cc 4D68 turbo I4
- Transmission: 5-speed manual 4-speed automatic 4-speed INVECS semi-auto

Dimensions
- Wheelbase: 2,520–2,550 mm (99.2–100.4 in)
- Length: 4,290–4,480 mm (168.9–176.4 in)
- Width: 1,695–1,740 mm (66.7–68.5 in) (JDM vehicles at 1695mm only)
- Height: 1,625–1,730 mm (64.0–68.1 in)
- Curb weight: 1,380–1,545 kg (3,042–3,406 lb)

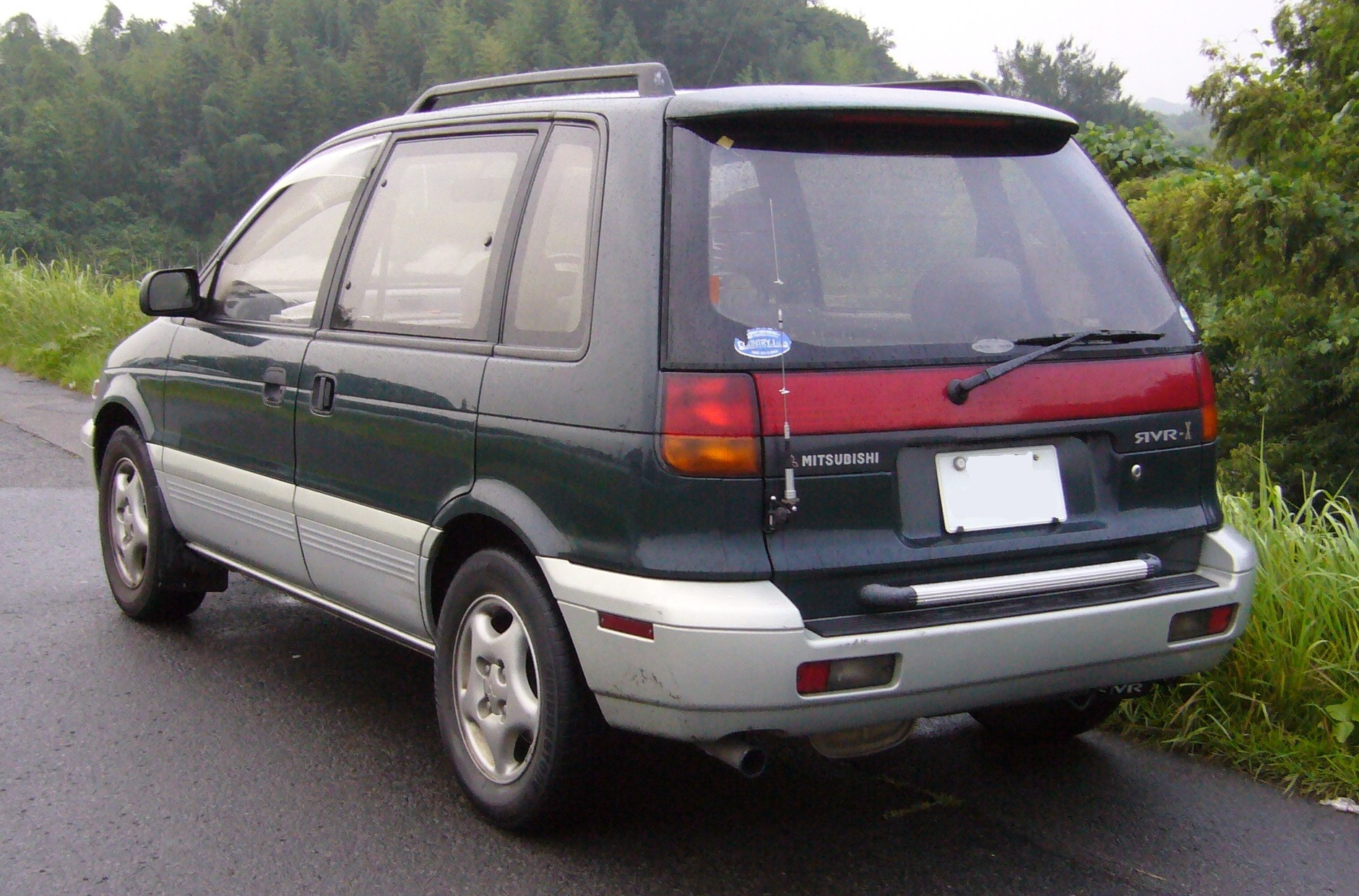
Rear

The first generation RVR, introduced February 1991, is a compact MPV, manufactured from 1991 until 1997 and marketed as the Mitsubishi Space Runner in Europe and Mitsubishi Expo LRV in the United States. Export markets in Asia and Oceania used the Japanese market name. The RVR was also marketed by Chrysler as the Dodge/Plymouth Colt Wagon and Eagle Summit Wagon captive imports in North America. Its "tall wagon" configuration traces to Italdesign's 1978 Lancia Megagamma concept.

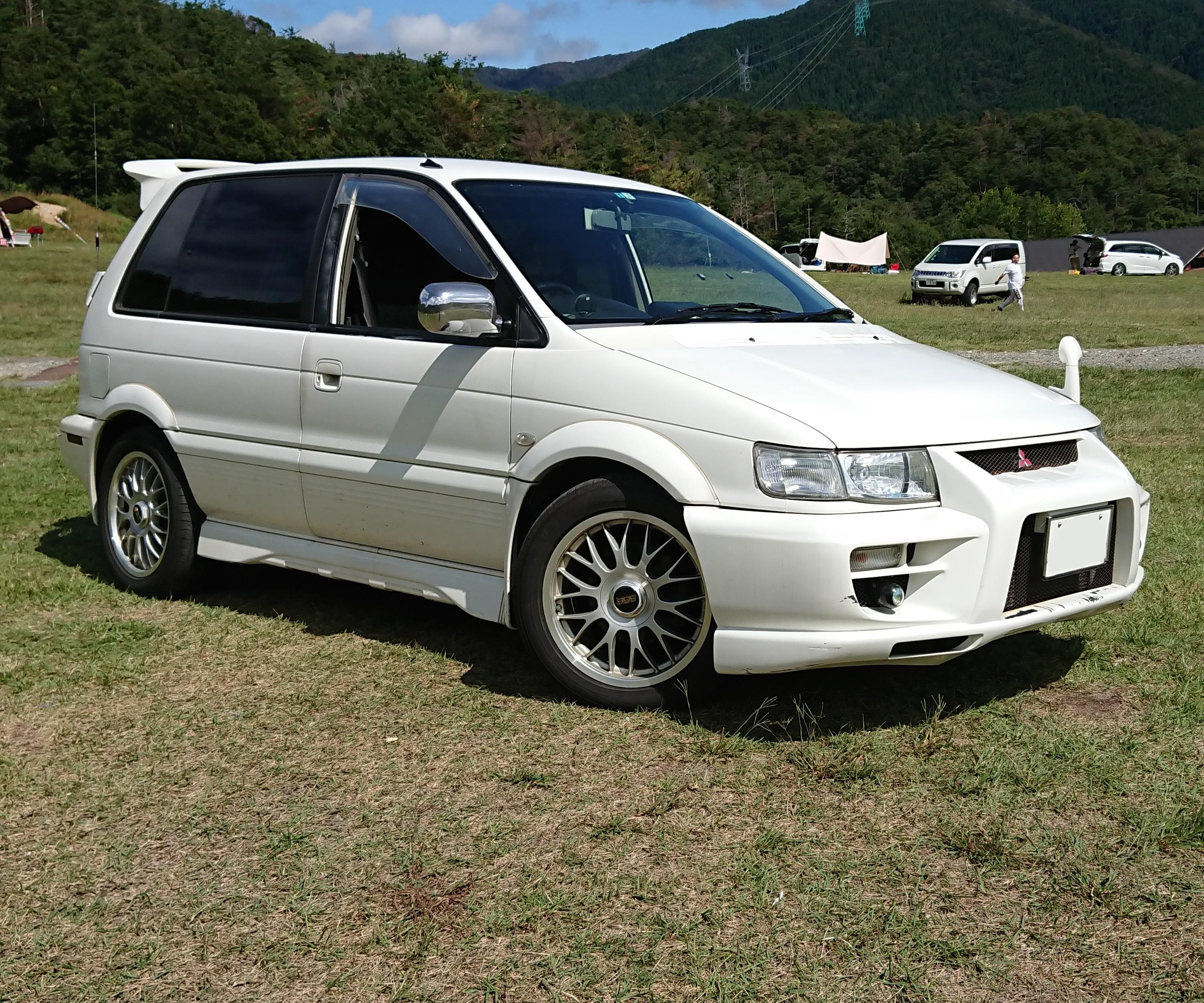
Mitsubishi RVR Hyper Sports Gear-R (Japan)

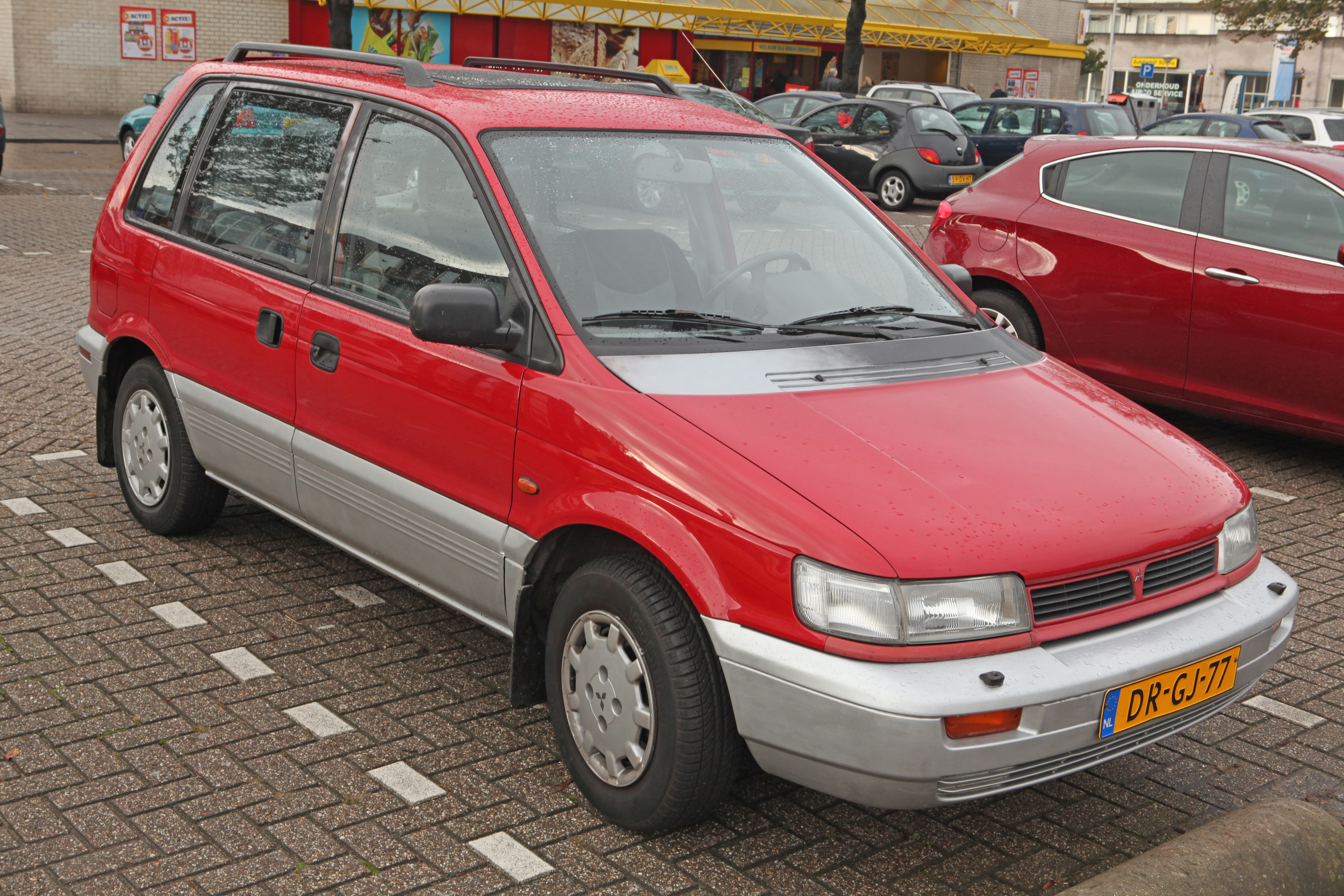
Mitsubishi Space Runner (Europe)

The RVR was essentially a second generation Mitsubishi Chariot (marketed in some markets as the Space Wagon) with its chassis shortened by 20 cm (7.9 in), sharing most components with the longer variant. Its tall wagon body style featured two rows of seats, equipped with a single rear door and, in all markets, a single sliding door on the passenger side. The Mitsubishi sliding door latched to a "B" pillar, whereas those of the Toyota and Nissan vehicles did not. The rear windows did not retract but were forward hinged. The rear windows on the longer Chariot did retract into the doors.

The fuel tank access door was on the right side for all versions sold internationally. In the LHD models, which had the sliding door on the right side, an interlock prevented the door from opening too far when the fuel filler door was open.

The standard installed fixed position rear bench seat arrangement could accommodate three persons and the seatbacks had a 50:50 split: the reclining seat backs could be folded forward, flat upon the seats, and then the seat cushion could be detached at the rear and folded up and forward towards the front seats, leaving a flat floor for large cargo items. When the entire bench was removed, the flat floor extended all the way from the back of the front seats to the rear hatchback door. The optional sliding bench rear seats could accommodate three people, with the setup allowing rear seat passengers additional leg room by sliding the entire rear seat assembly back. Depending on seating arrangements, the rear seats can then produce a large enough interior space by sliding the seats completely forward, then extending the seatbacks completely flat.

Originally installed with a naturally aspirated 2.0L/1.8L petrol engine, it was later introduced with a turbodiesel option. The mid-model sports model with a detuned type of turbo engine 4G63 is also carried on the Lancer Evolution its "X3" and "Super Sport Gear" and offered an optional sliding metal sunroof. In North America, a 2.4 L (2,351 cc) 135 hp (101 kW) engine was available on FWD versions, and standard on AWD versions at least as early as MY 1993. The final and most powerful model, the "Hyper Sports Gear", was added in January 1997. The Hyper Sports Gear R trim package in Japan used the drivetrain of the first Mitsubishi Galant VR-4; the 4G63T 2.0-liter, 16V DOHC, turbocharged four mated to either a four-speed auto or a five speed manual. Open front and rear differentials were used on vehicles equipped with 4WD. Power output of the turbocharged models were rated at 170–184 kW (231–250 PS; 228–247 hp) JIS.

Automatic Transmission shift lock was mechanism instead of an electrical control, a unique method that deregulation was mechanically wire extending from the brake pedal. This was also the advantage of being unaffected by the battery.

- History (Japan)
  - February 1991 – initial release. Three grades are available; 2WD models were "S" while 4WD vehicles were either "R" or "X" trim. All versions were available with manuals as well as automatics.
  - June 1991 – The new 1.8-liter engine was added; this model was called "Z".
  - October 1992 – "Sports Gear" added. At the same time a diesel 4WD version of the "Z" was introduced.
  - May 1993 – "Z Special Version" released. Based on the 2WD "1.8 Z" model, it added roof rails, grille guard, and keyless entry as standard equipment.
  - August 1993 – 3-door specifications adopted an open roof in the front seat electric "open gear" added.
  - January 1994 – Another "Special Edition" was released, this time based on the 4WD "1.8 Z" and featuring standard roof rails and front sports seats.
  - June 1994 – 2.0 "Open Gear" special edition models equipped with keyless entry and a grille guard on the base 2WD models "open gear limited" release.
  - September 1994 – 2.0L intercooled turbo engine added, turbo intercooler diesel engine was. You can also change the shape of the headlights and front bumper, the car was designed almost from the RV. Lineup "X2" and the intercooler turbo engine with "X3", "sports gear" with wide fenders and turbo "Super Sport Gear", "open gear" with wide fenders and turbo "Super Open Gear" four grades newly added.
  - October 1994 – 2.0 "Sports Gear", based on specially designed vehicles equipped with private bars and stripes and large under guard "Wild gear 'sale.
  - May 1995 – some improvements. Diesel vehicles meet the emission control (vehicle type is "Y-" from "KD-" change), and changed some of the body color.
  - June 1995 – "2.0S" roof rail-based, special edition models such as the driver-side airbag-equipped version "S" on sale.
  - October 1995 – special edition models, "Wild Gear" was released again. Only added a large new front grille guard.
  - December 1995 – "1.8 Sport Gear" based on, roof rails, driver airbag, special edition models equipped with keyless entry, such as "Sports Gear Limited 1.8" release.
  - January 1996 – special edition models, "Sports Gear Limited 2.0" and "X3 Special" on sale. The former is a 2.0 "sports gear", based on aluminum wheels with a cassette deck. The latter "X3" is equipped with a spoiler and rear spoiler and front-side based.
  - May 1996 – some improvements. "Sports Gear" will be the only car 2.0L, the new "Sports gear Z" established. In addition, the driver airbag is standard on all models.
  - September 1996 – "Sports Gear" based on, roof rails, keyless entry, and other special edition models employing ABS "Field Express" released.
  - January 1997 – equipped with large-scale aero "Hyper Sports Gear Z" · "Hyper Sports gear R" added. At the same time, "Sports Gear", based on vehicle specifications and special features such as keyless entry ABS "sports gear V20" on sale.
  - July 1997 – "Open Gear" specifications were changed.

=== North America ===
The Mitsubishi RVR was sold at North American Mitsubishi dealerships under the Expo LRV (LRV stood for Light Recreational Vehicle) nameplate; they were available in a few different trim levels, with front-wheel-drive and all-wheel-drive powertrains, 2.4 4G64 and 1.8 4G93 four cylinder engines (diesel engines were not offered), and 4-speed automatic or 5-speed manual transmissions available. The Expo LRV models (offered alongside the larger Expo) were sold from 1991 to 1995; at the end of 1995, the Expo and LRV models were discontinued in North America.

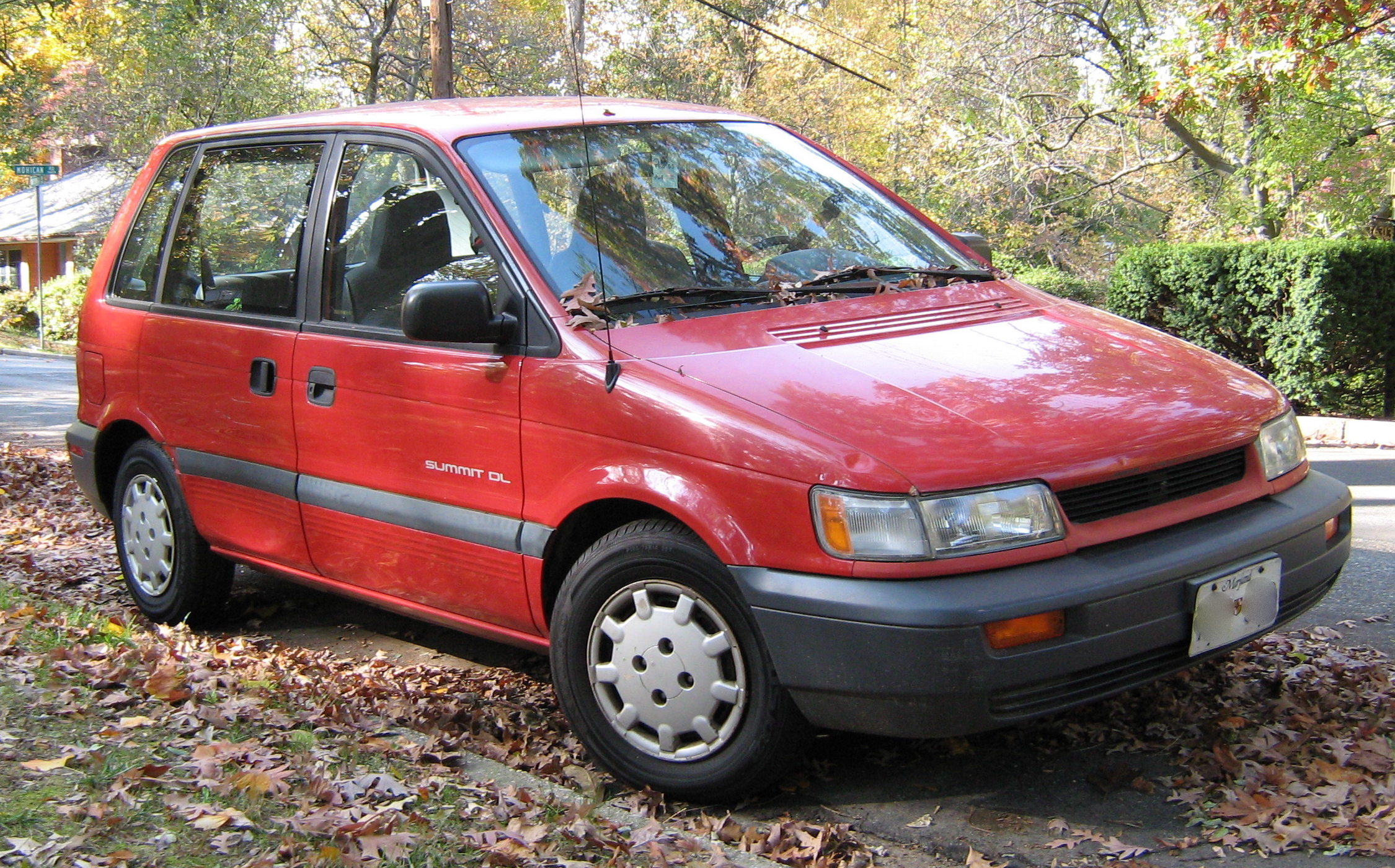
Eagle Summit DL wagon

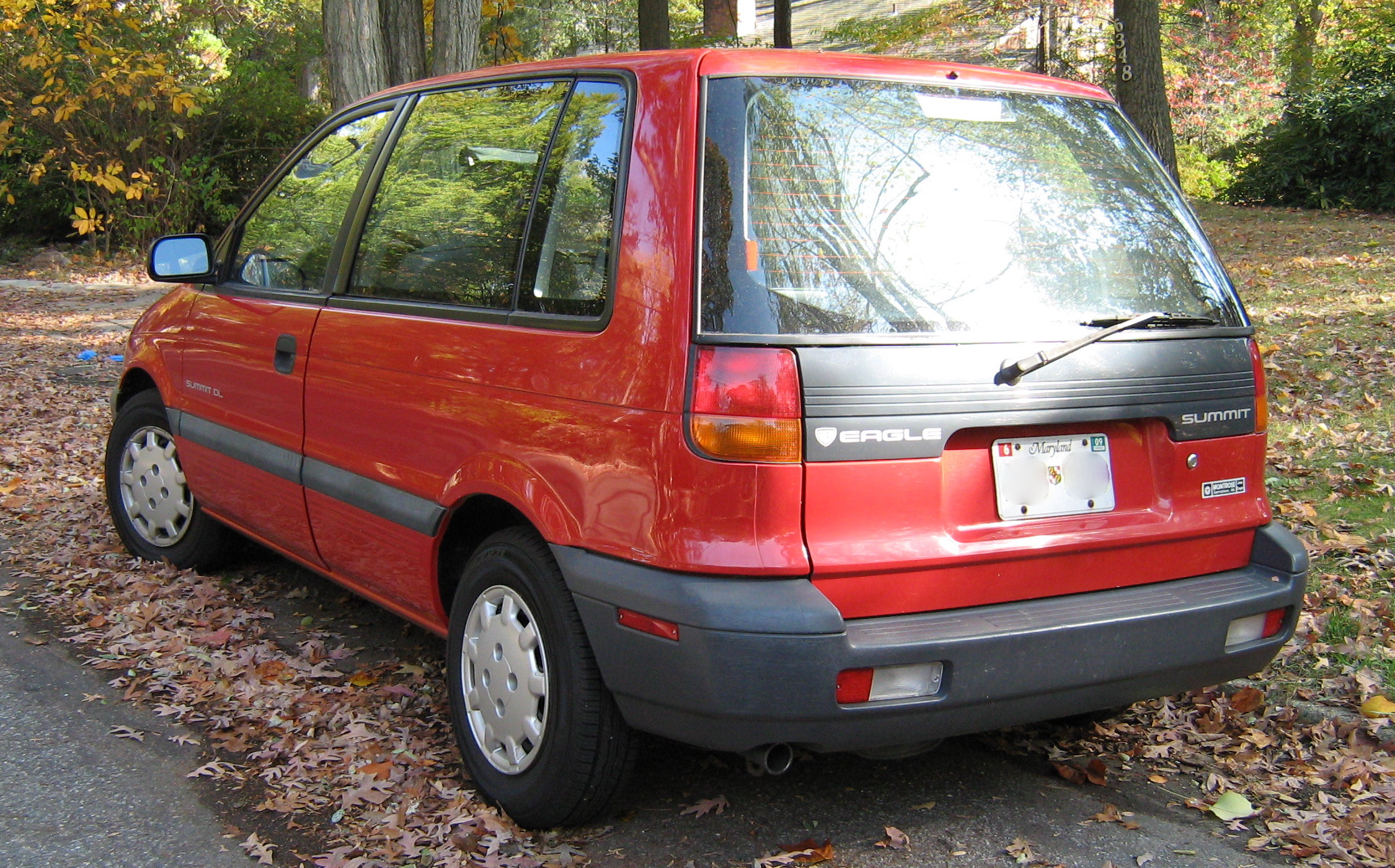
Eagle Summit DL wagon

In North America, the RVR was also sold and marketed by Chrysler as the Dodge/Plymouth Colt Vista Wagon and Eagle Summit Wagon captive imports as station wagon models of the Dodge/Plymouth Colt and the Eagle Summit. As those were rebadgings of the Mitsubishi Mirage and Lancer, the cars didn't share much beyond the nameplate. These Wagons were sold for model years 1992-1996 and replaced the Dodge/Plymouth Colt Vista and the Canada-only Eagle Vista Wagon, all based on the previous generation Mitsubishi Chariot.

The Summit Wagon was available in DL and LX trims, as well as in a four-wheel drive version considered a trim level of its own. As a compact MPV, it was marketed as a small car with the roominess of a minivan with its interior offering high seating positions and removable rear seats.

== Second generation (N60/N70; 1997) ==
Second generation (N60/N70)
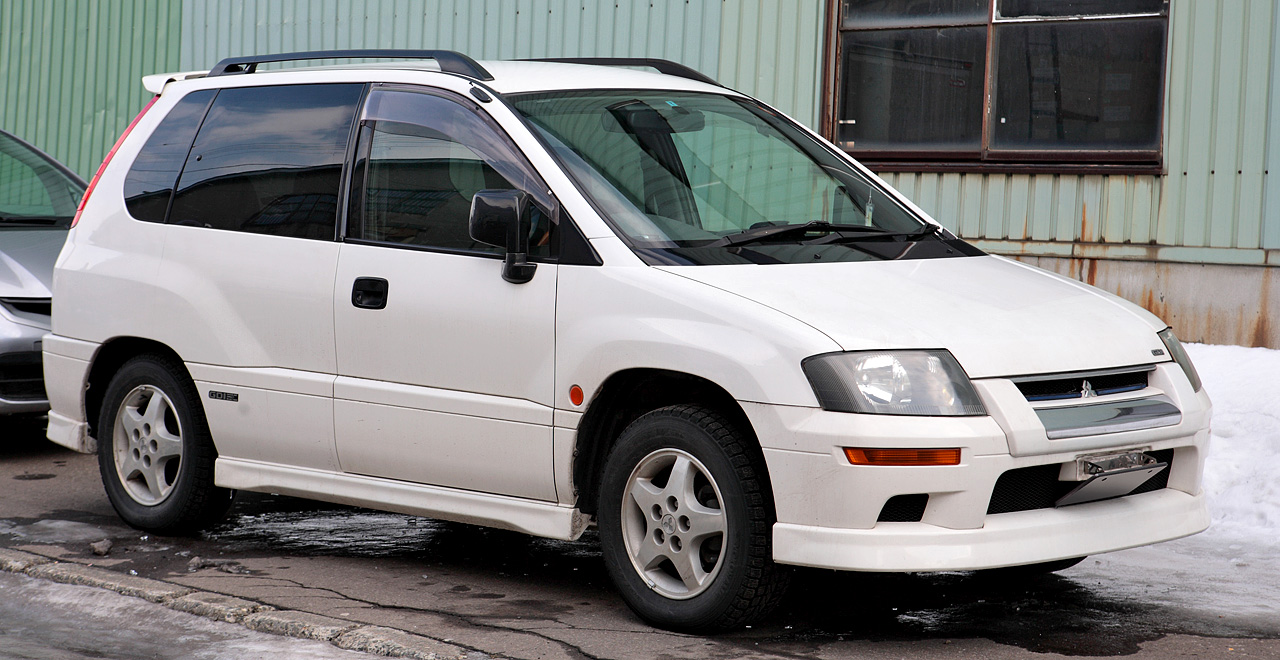
- Mitsubishi RVR (facelift)

Overview
- Also called: Mitsubishi Space Runner
- Production: 1997–2002
- Assembly: Nagoya Plant, Okazaki, Aichi, Japan

Body and chassis
- Class: Compact MPV
- Body style: 4/5-door wagon
- Layout: Front-engine, front-wheel-drive or four-wheel-drive
- Related: Mitsubishi Chariot Grandis

Powertrain
- Engine: 1.8 L 4G93 DOHC GDI I4; 2.0 L 4G63T turbo I4; 2.4 L 4G64 DOHC GDI I4
- Transmission: 5-speed manual 4-speed automatic 4-speed INVECS semi-auto

Dimensions
- Wheelbase: 2,550 mm (100.4 in)
- Length: 4,280–4,480 mm (168.5–176.4 in)
- Width: 1,695–1,780 mm (66.7–70.1 in)
- Height: 1,650–1,720 mm (65.0–67.7 in)
- Curb weight: 1,380–1,570 kg (3,042–3,461 lb)

The second generation was introduced in 1997. This generation was split into the regular, more minivan-like RVR GDI and the RVR Sports Gear with sporting off-road pretensions. Thanks to various bumper and fender extensions, the Sports Gear was too large to classify as a compact car in Japan and was thus placed in a considerably higher tax grouping. This generation RVR was not sold in North America (except Mexico). In Europe, this car was restyled and sold as the Mitsubishi Space Runner.

The model offers a significant facelift, which was done to mirror the image design of the Chariot Grandis and its brisk sales in 1999 at the time. Standard grades were grouped into "X" (later the "Exceed") and the sportier "Sports Gear" models, the standard type "X" has a 1.8-litre gasoline engine while the "Sports Gear" used a 2.4-litre GDI engine or the turbocharged, two-litre 4G63. Vehicles installed with the 2.4-litre engine were liable for additional yearly tax charges in Japan due to the engine size exceeding the Japanese regulations concerning engine displacement, and the width of the vehicle was 1,780 mm (70.1 in). Vehicles with the smaller engines were installed in vehicles with reduced width at 1,695 mm (66.7 in) so that buyers weren't liable for additional taxes. The high performance "Sports Gear X3" model came with a leather-wrapped steering wheel and shift knob with self-leveling xenon headlights; the model-specific seat fabric received an interwoven hummingbird pattern.

In February 1999 a special "Fishing Gear" package was released, aimed at fishing enthusiasts (bass fishers in particular). This package was available for the entire lineup and consisted of various extras suitable for sport fishers, such as a built-in refrigerator, a fishing rod stand and holder, a roof box, additional interior and exterior lights, and special, water-repellant seat covers.

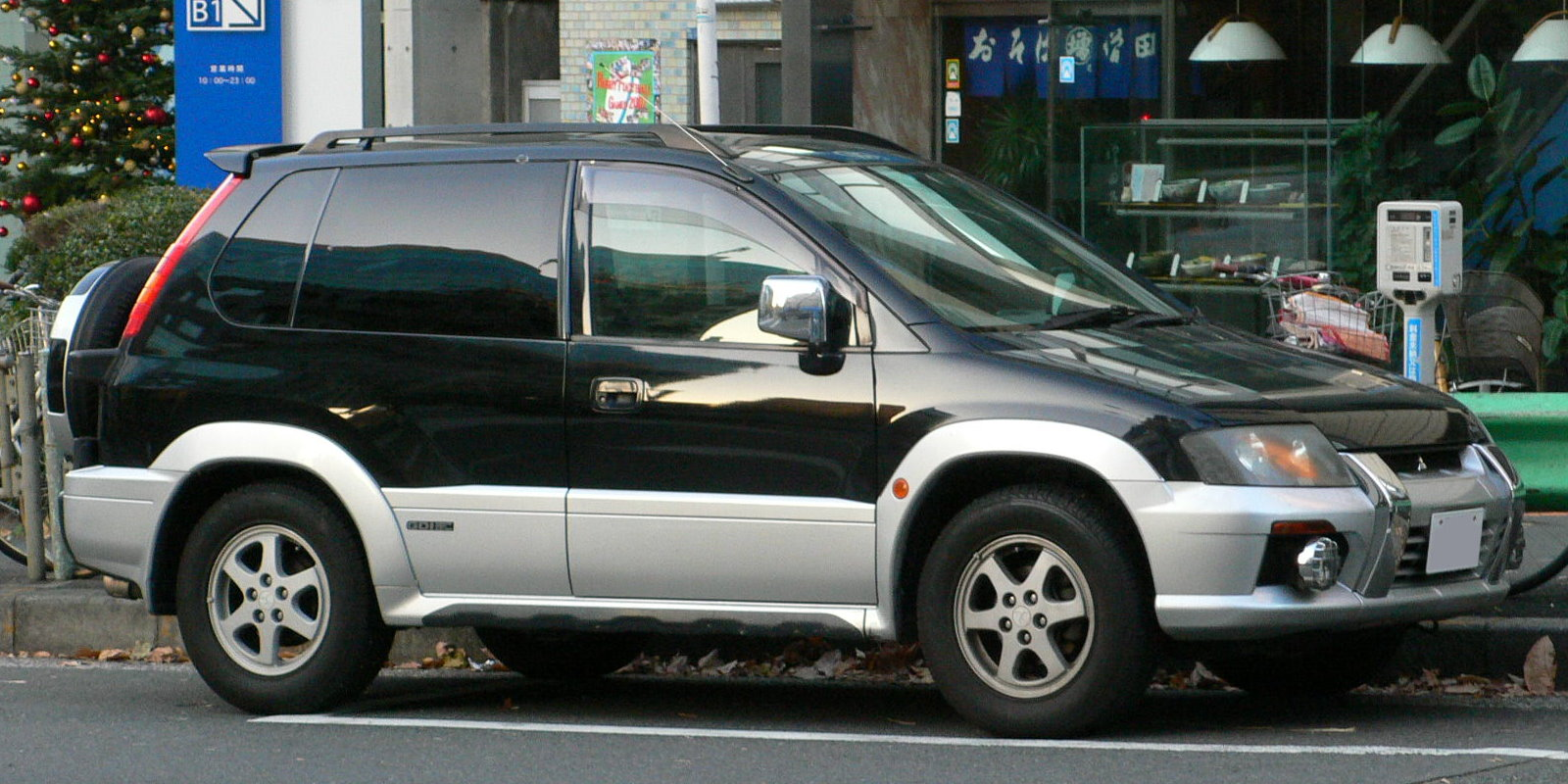
1997 Mitsubishi RVR (pre-facelift)

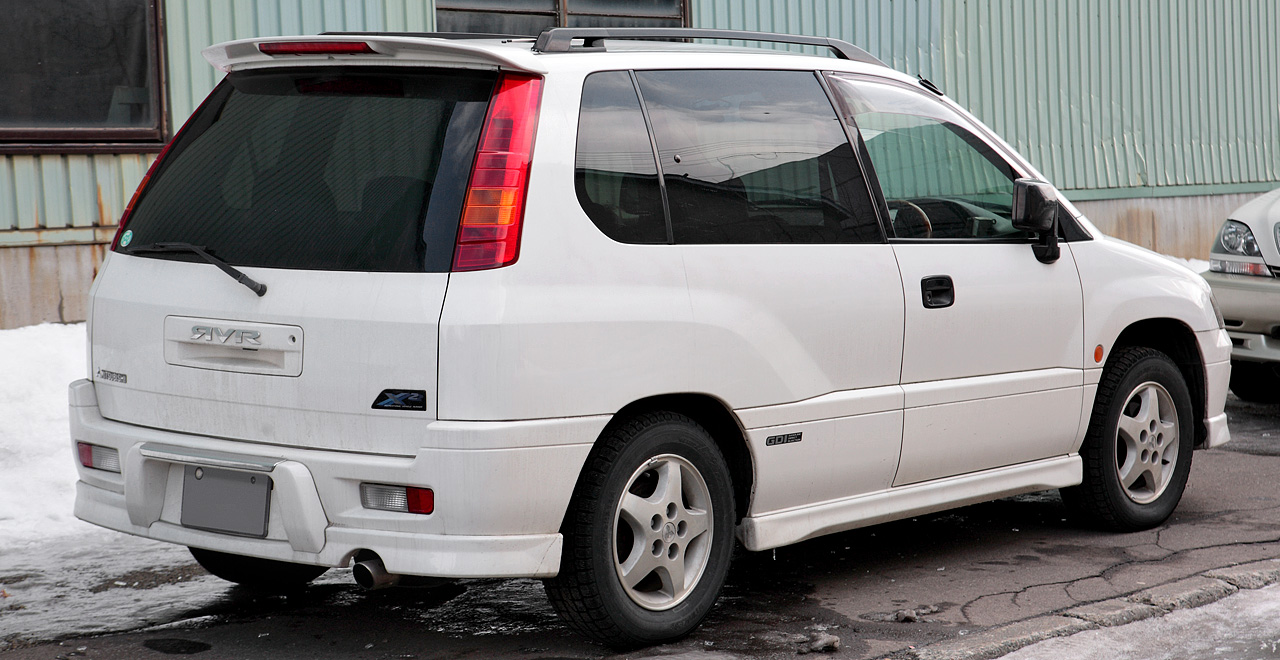
Mitsubishi RVR (facelift)

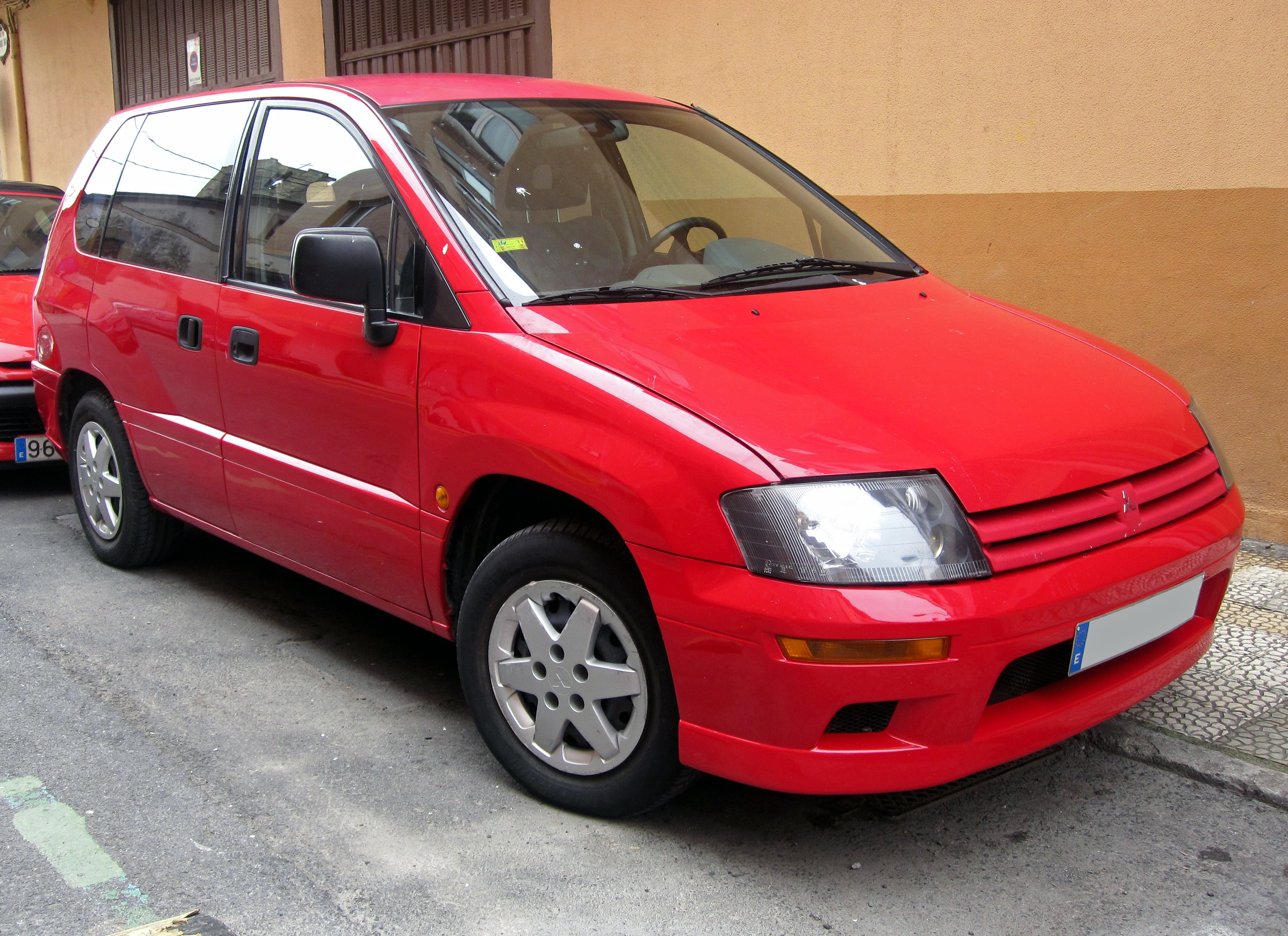
The narrow-bodied version, here a European-market Mitsubishi Space Runner

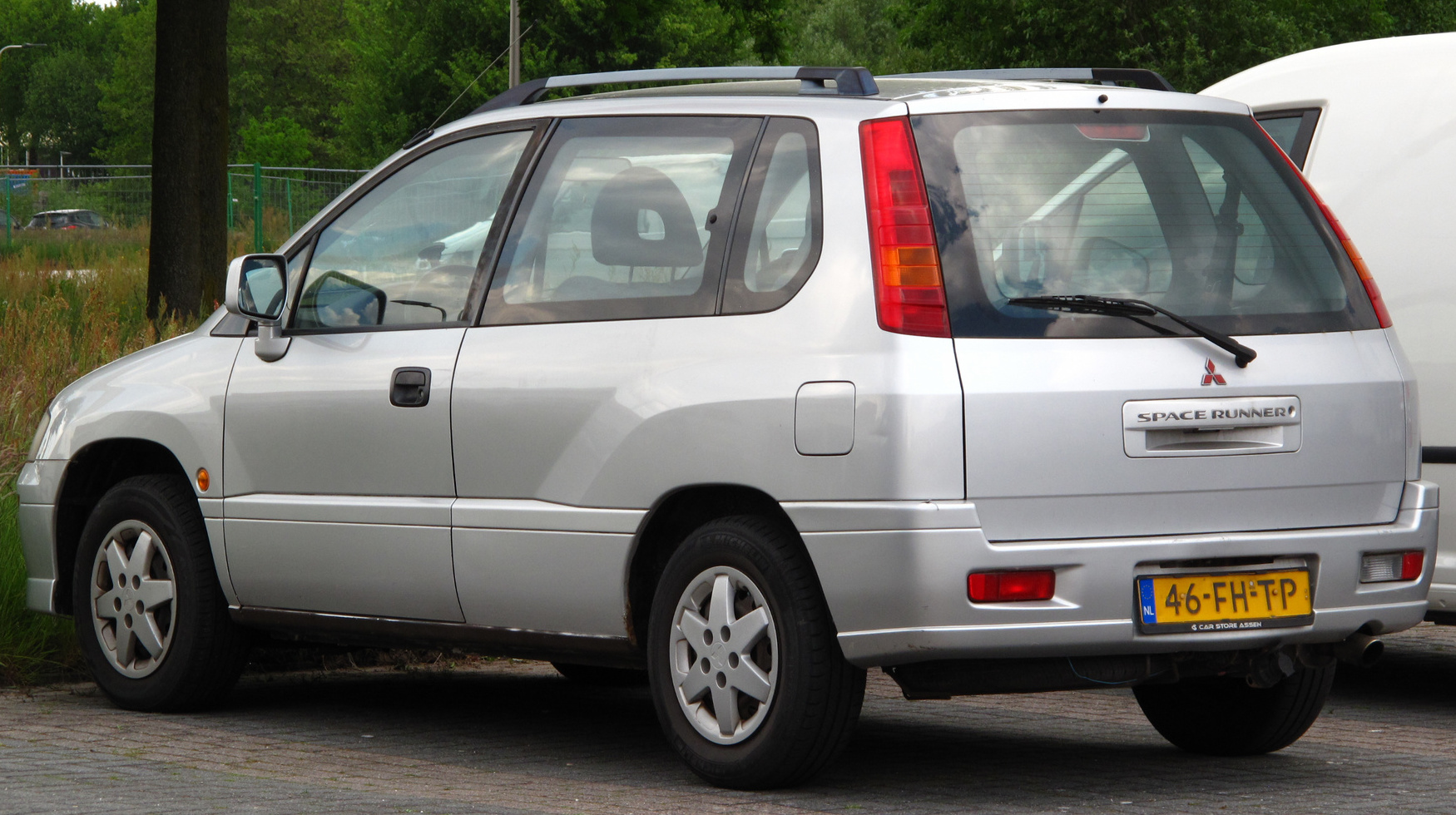
2000 Mitsubishi Space Runner 2.0 GLXi (facelift, Netherlands)

== Third generation (GA/XA/XB/XC/XD; 2010) ==
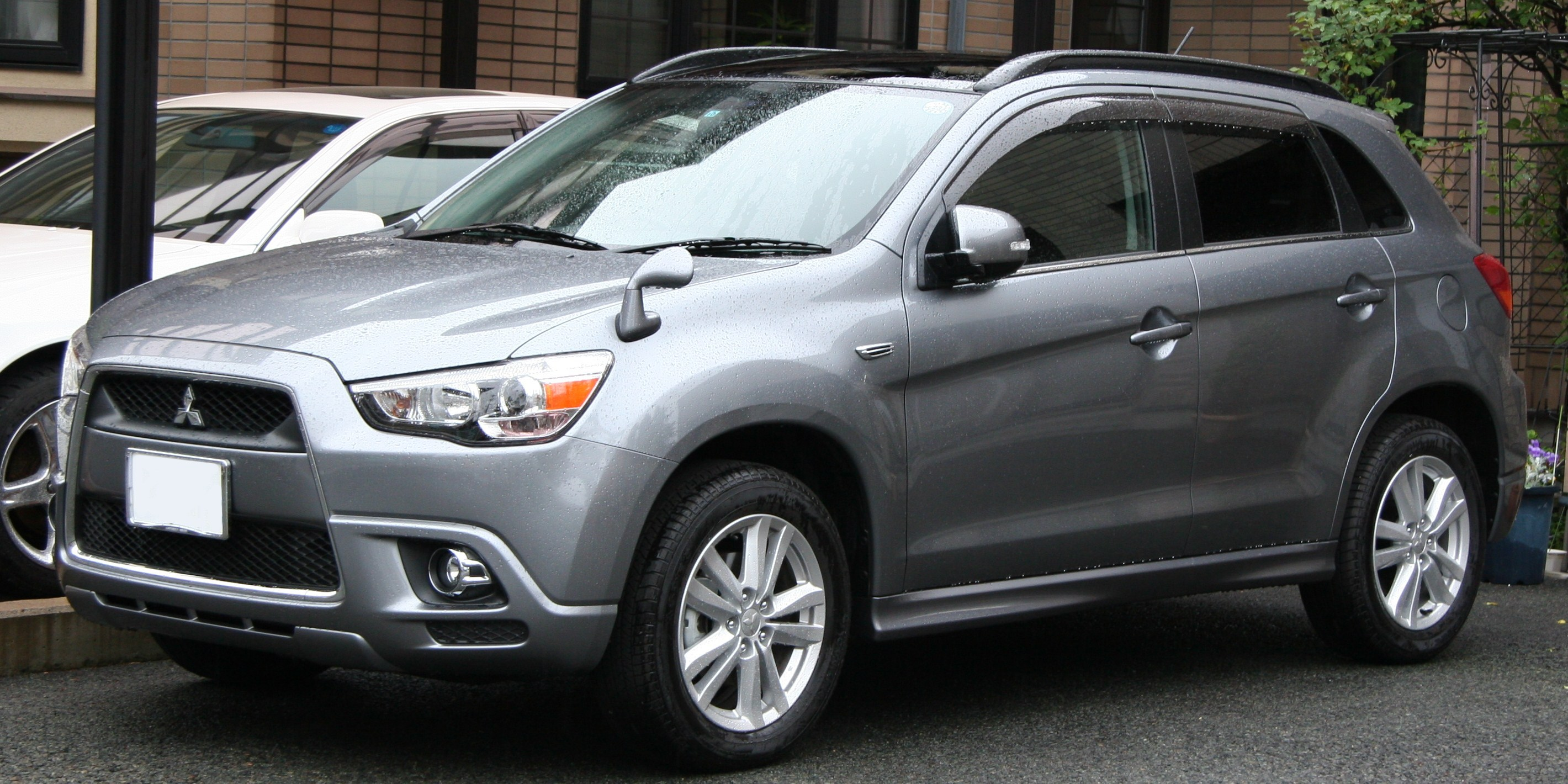
Mitsubishi RVR (Japan)

The third-generation RVR, which is a subcompact SUV, first released in the Japanese domestic market on 17 February 2010. The name RVR is only used in Japan, South Korea, and Canada. In most markets, it is sold as the Mitsubishi ASX (an abbreviation of "Active Sports Crossover"), and as the Mitsubishi Outlander Sport in the United States, Argentina, Brazil, and Indonesia. The design was influenced from the Concept-cX prototype first exhibited at the 62nd Frankfurt Motor Show in July 2007.

Mitsubishi has concentrated on emphasizing the RVR's fuel economy and low emissions, as part of the company's plan to reposition itself as a maker of smaller and more efficient cars, in contrast to its previous successes building large SUVs.
