= Mitsubishi Orion engine =

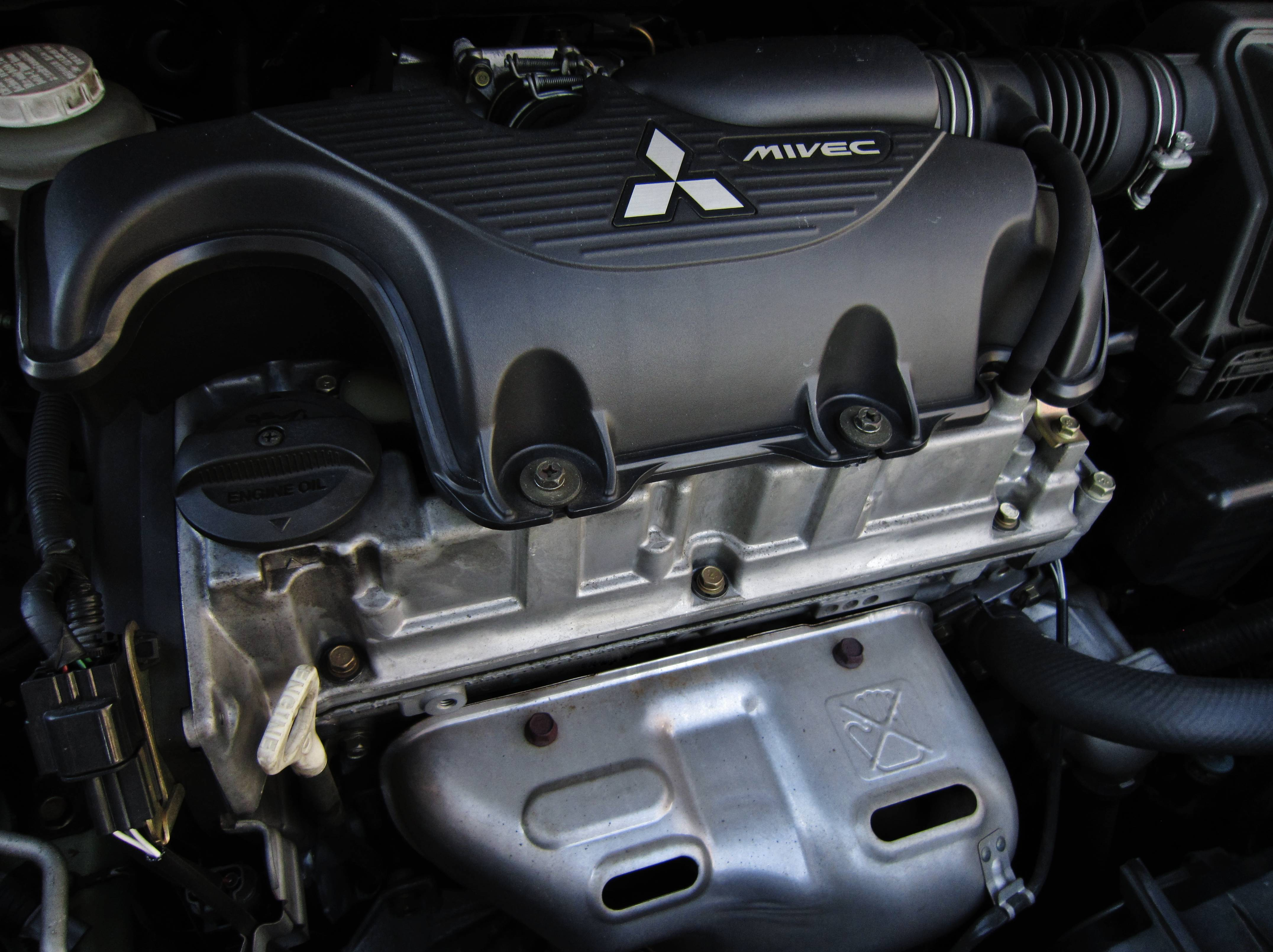

Overview
- Manufacturer: Mitsubishi Motors
- Also called: 4G1
- Production: 1977–present

Layout
- Configuration: Straight-4
- Displacement: 1.2–1.6 L (1,244–1,584 cc)
- Cylinder bore: 68.2 mm (2.69 in); 69.5 mm (2.74 in); 71 mm (2.8 in); 72.2 mm (2.84 in); 74 mm (2.91 in); 75.5 mm (2.97 in); 76 mm (2.99 in)
- Piston stroke: 82 mm (3.23 in); 87.3 mm (3.44 in)
- Cylinder block material: Cast iron
- Valvetrain: OHV 2 valves x cyl. SOHC 2 or 3 valves x cyl. DOHC 4 valves x cyl. with MIVEC or without
- Compression ratio: 9.4:1

Combustion
- Turbocharger: TC06 (on 4G12T only)
- Fuel system: Carburetor; Multi-port fuel injection Direct injection
- Fuel type: Gasoline
- Cooling system: Water-cooled

Output
- Power output: 70–110 PS (51–81 kW)
- Torque output: 10.9–15.3 kg⋅m (107–150 N⋅m; 79–111 lb⋅ft)

Chronology
- Predecessor: Neptune engine

The Mitsubishi Orion or 4G1 engine is a series of inline-four internal combustion engines introduced by Mitsubishi Motors in around 1977, along with the Astron, Sirius, and Saturn. It was first introduced in the Colt and Colt-derived models in 1978. Displacement ranges from 1.2 to 1.6 L (1,244 to 1,584 cc). The Orion replaced the earlier Neptune engine and carried over that engines overall layout and crossflow design. Unlike the near-square Neptune, however, the Orion was a long-stroke design.

== 4G11 ==
The 4G11 displaces 1.2 L (1,244 cc) with a bore and stroke of 69.5 mm × 82 mm (2.74 in × 3.23 in). This design utilized Mitsubishi's new lean burn MCA-Jet technology, with a head which included a tiny second inlet valve which created a swirl, allowing for combustion of a much leaner fuel mixture.

Applications:

- Mitsubishi Colt/Mirage A151A
- 1977.04-1979.03 Mitsubishi Lancer A141A
- 1979.03-1985.02 Mitsubishi Lancer Van A141V/A148V
- 1979.11-1983 Mitsubishi Lancer EX A171A

== 4G12 ==
The 4G12 (also known as the G11B) displaces 1.4 L (1,410 cc) with a bore and stroke of 74 mm × 82 mm (2.91 in × 3.23 in). 4G12 was the first to feature Mitsubishi's MD (modulated displacement) technology, a form of variable displacement which shut off two cylinders during light load and at low speeds. The 4G12 was not offered by Mitsubishi with fuel injection. This engine is fairly outdated compared to its counterparts that were used in the later Lancers.

Applications:

- Mitsubishi Colt/Mirage A152A
- 1978.04-1979.03 Mitsubishi Lancer A142A
- 1979.03-1985.02 Mitsubishi Lancer Van A142V/A149V
- 1978.04-1981.07 Mitsubishi (Lancer) Celeste A142
- Mitsubishi Lancer EX A172A
- Mitsubishi Tredia/Cordia A211
- Dodge/Plymouth Colt
- Plymouth Champ

=== 4G12T ===
This is the turbocharged version of the 4G12, uses a TC-04 turbocharger from Mitsubishi Heavy Industries. The diameter of the blades in this charger is rather small, at 49 mm, and it spins at 90,000 rpm to provide 0.53 bar (7.7 psi) of boost. This increased power and torque by about 30 and 25 percent respectively. The Japanese-specification version of this engine produces 105 PS (77 kW) at 5,500 rpm and 15.5 kg⋅m (152 N⋅m; 112 lb⋅ft) of torque at 3,000 rpm.

== 4G13 ==
The SOHC, 12 & 16 valve 4G13 displaces 1.3 L (1,298 cc) and produces 75–85 PS (55–63 kW) with a bore and stroke of 71 mm × 82 mm (2.80 in × 3.23 in). In the Gulf Countries, 90 PS (66 kW) gross at 6000 rpm is claimed on the Mitsubishi Lancer CB1. The 4G13 engine has been produced by Dongan Mitsubishi Motors Engine Manufacturing, in Harbin, China since September 1998.

Applications:
- Mitsubishi Carisma
- Mitsubishi Colt / Mirage / Lancer (1983, 1987, 1991, 1995, 2000)
- Mitsubishi Dingo
- Great Wall Florid
- Great Wall Voleex C30
- Hyundai Excel
- Mitsubishi Space Star
- CMC Veryca 1.3
- Proton Saga (C20)
- Proton Wira / Persona (C90)
- Proton Satria / Persona Compact (C90)
- Zotye 2008 / Nomad
- Emgrand GL
- Brilliance BS2
- Heyue Tongyue / JAC A13 / JAC J3
- 2014–2017 Emgrand EC7

== 4G15 ==
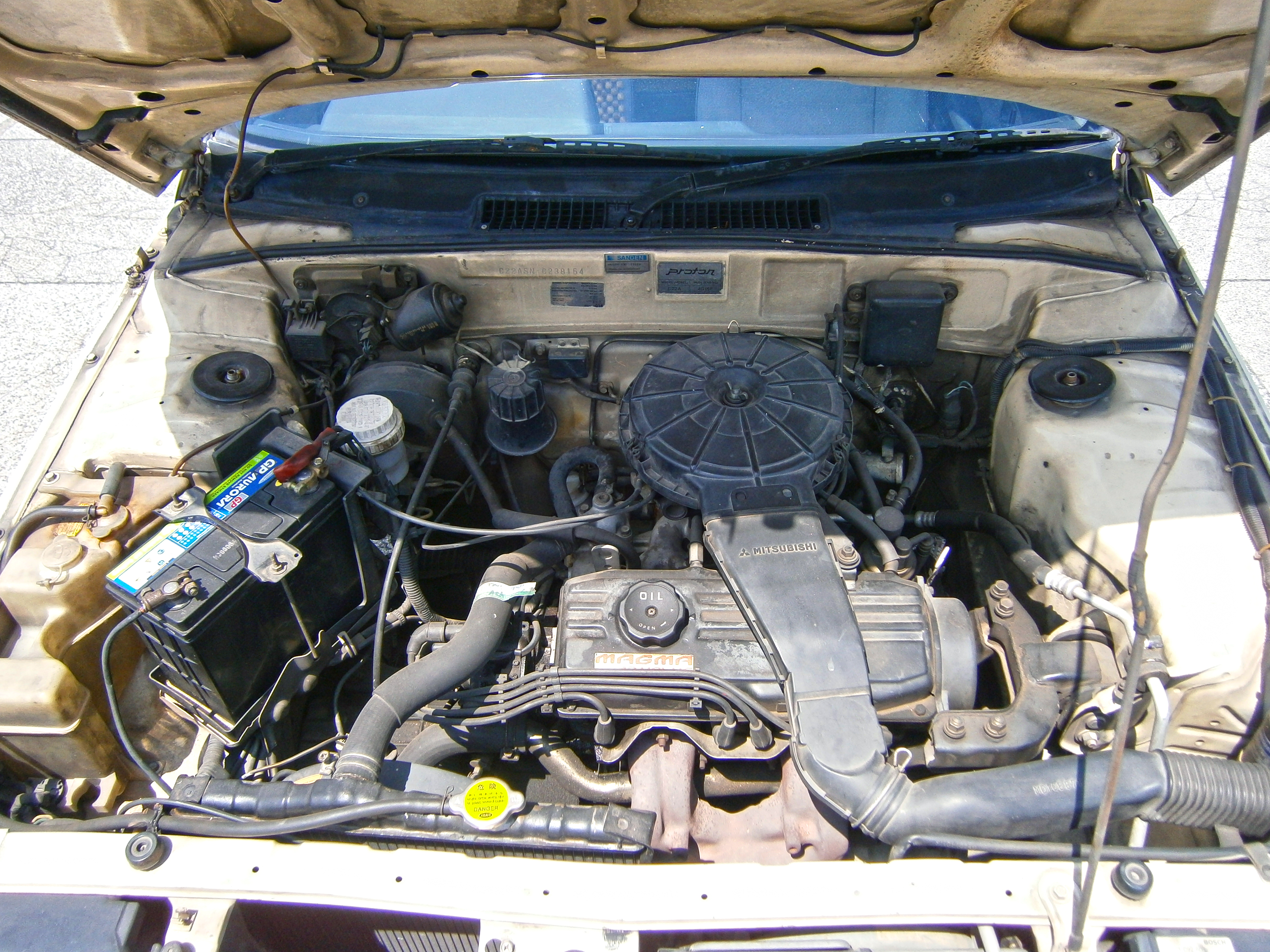
The 4G15P engine in the first generation Proton Saga.

The SOHC 4G15 displaces 1.5 L (1,468 cc) with a bore and stroke of 75.5 mm × 82 mm (2.97 in × 3.23 in). A version of the 4G15 was produced with gasoline multi-port fuel injection. It has approximately 94 hp (69 kW) on the 1993 Mirage model. The DOHC 4G15 produces 109 hp (81 kW) with 137 N⋅m (101 lb⋅ft) of torque. Another DOHC version was combined with GDI fuel injection and delivers 100 hp (74 kW) and 137 N⋅m (101 lb⋅ft) of torque. A DOHC MIVEC turbo variant of the engine is also still in production to date (4G15T), serving in the Mitsubishi Colt series, offering 165 hp (121 kW) on the latest Colt Version-R (with exhaust enhancement). The most powerful version of this engine is found in the Colt CZT Ralliart (special model in Switzerland) with a total output of 197 hp (147 kW). When installed in the Smart ForFour Brabus, the engine received the Mercedes-Benz engine code M122 E15 AL. There was a recorded instance of the engine exceeding 997,000 mi (1,604,516 km) in a 1998 Mitsubishi Mirage sedan.

The 4G15 is known as one of the longest living Japanese engines ever produced where new variants of the engine are still being produced and used in Chinese cars since 2005. The 4G15 engine has been produced by Dongan Mitsubishi Motors Engine Manufacturing in Harbin, China. And also the new engines have been produced by GAC Mitsubishi Motors, a joint venture from the Hunan province in southern China, since April 2017.

The car that had the second longest lifespan with this engine to date before being discontinued was the Chinese-built Emgrand EC7 from Geely, with 13 years from 2009 to 2022. The 4G15 engine in the Emgrand EC7 was then replaced with engines sourced from Volvo from 2023 onwards.

Applications:
- Mitsubishi Colt / Mirage / Lancer (1983, 1987, 1991, 1995, 2000)
  - 1989–1995 Mitsubishi Mirage (US) (early design: timing belt on driver's side)
  - 1996–2002 Mitsubishi Mirage (US) (later design: engine rotated 180* timing belt on passenger side)
  - 1988–1995 Dodge/Plymouth Colt (early design: timing belt on driver's side)
  - 1988–1996 Eagle Summit (early design: timing belt on driver's side)
- 1986-1994 Hyundai Excel (US) (early design: timing belt on driver's side)
- 1987–1992 Proton Saga (C20)
- 1993–2009 Proton Wira / Persona (C90)
- 1994–2005 Proton Satria / Persona Compact (C90)
- 1998–2003 Mitsubishi Dingo
- 2002–2009 Proton Arena / Jumbuck
- 2004–2006 Smart Forfour Brabus (Turbo)
- 2005–2010 BYD F3 (4G15S, EFI, distributor-less ignition)
- 2005–2019 Mitsubishi Colt T120SS MPi (Indonesia, 86 PS (63 kW)). It replaced the 1.3-litre 4G17 in the T120SS in March 2005.
- 2005–2009 Mitsubishi Maven
- 2008–2009 Soueast V3 Lingyue
- 2008–2010 Zotye 2008 / Nomad
- 2009–2014 BYD G3
- 2009–2022 Emgrand EC7
- 2009–2013 Youngman Lotus L3
- 2014–2016 Geely MK
- 2015–2017 Changan CS35
- 2016–present Yusheng S330
- 2017–2023 Geely Yuanjing X3
- 2017–present Zotye T300
- 2018–present Zotye T500
- 2018–present Zotye T600
- Hyundai power generators (Made in Bangladesh)

=== SOHC 8-valve (4G15) ===
This version of the 4G15 is a single overhead camshaft (SOHC) 8-valve, carburetor type engine. It is an in-line four with a compact type combustion chamber. The engine's advertised power was 77 PS (57 kW; 76 hp) (DIN) and 127 N⋅m (94 lb⋅ft) of torque.

The engine is an analogue of the Mitsubishi G15B in terms of the engine mechanical specifications except for the valve timing. The G13B is also equipped with jet valves and jet springs.

SPECIFICATIONS:

Total displacement: 1.5 L (1,468 cc)

Bore x Stroke: 75.5 mm × 82 mm (2.97 in × 3.23 in)

Compression Ratio: 9.4:1

=== SOHC 12-valve (4G15) ===
A 12-valve version (two intake and one exhausts per cylinder) of the 1468 cc 4G15 engine. It entered production in 1989, for the third generation Mitsubishi Mirage/Lancer. It was available with a carburettor or fuel injection, producing 85 or 100 PS (63 or 74 kW) in Japanese market trim at the time of introduction. Later, a natural gas-powered version was added and in 1991 a new lean-burn technology called "Mitsubishi Vertical Vortex" (MVV) was introduced on this engine.

== 4G16 ==
The 4G16 displaces 1.2 L (1,198 cc) from a 68.2 mm × 82 mm (2.69 in × 3.23 in) bore and stroke. This engine was mainly offered in European markets, where it suited local tax regulations.

Applications:

- Mitsubishi Colt/Mirage
- Mitsubishi Lancer

== 4G17 ==
The 4G17 displaces 1.3 L (1,343 cc). It is a SOHC 12-valve engine. Bore and stroke is 72.2 mm × 82 mm (2.84 in × 3.23 in). Output of a carbureted version is 78 PS (57 kW; 77 hp) at 6,000 rpm and 10.9 kg⋅m (107 N⋅m; 79 lb⋅ft) of torque at 3,500 rpm.

Applications:

- 1991-2005 Mitsubishi Colt T120SS (Indonesia); production stopped due to Euro 2 emission standard that requires usage of gasoline-direct injection system, engine control unit / module (ECU/ECM), and catalytic converter usage.

== 4G18 ==
The SOHC 4G18 displaces 1.6 L (1,584 cc) with a bore and stroke of 76 mm × 87.3 mm (2.99 in × 3.44 in). It is a 4-valve per cylinder engine, which produces from 98 PS (72 kW) to 110 PS (81 kW) with 150 N⋅m (111 lb⋅ft) (European specifications). It uses a COP (Coil-On-Plug, also known as Plug-top coil) ignition rely on one coil to fire two cylinders, one of which was by spark plug wire. The 4G18 engine has been produced by Dongan Mitsubishi Motors Engine Manufacturing, in Harbin, China since April 2010.

Applications:
- Mitsubishi Colt Plus (Taiwan)
- Mitsubishi Kuda
- Mitsubishi Lancer
- Mitsubishi Space Star
- 2010-2011 Foton Midi
- Hafei Saima
- Proton Waja
- Zotye 2008 / Nomad / Hunter / T200, 2007-2009 78 kW
- 2005-2010 BYD F3
- Hafei Saibao
- Foton Midi
- MPM Motors PS160
- Brilliance BS2
- Brilliance BS4
- Landwind X6
- Zotye T600
- Zotye T700
- Mitsubishi Lancer (China)
- Soueast Lioncel
- Haima Haifuxing
- Tagaz Aquila 2013 to 2014
- 2009–2013 Emgrand EC7
- Mitsubishi Pajero iO (3-door pre-facelift, Australia)

== 4G19 ==
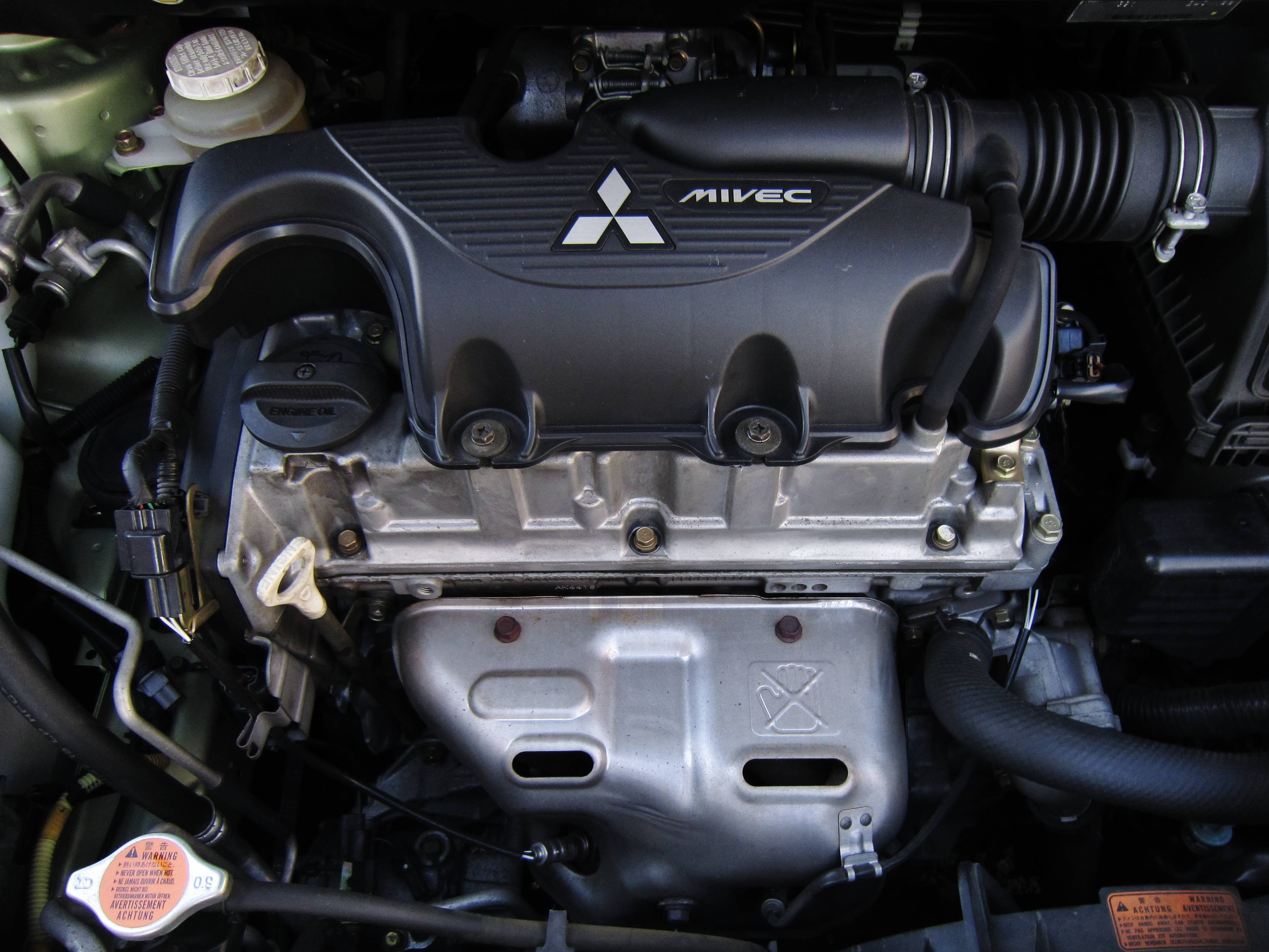
2003 Mitsubishi Colt 4G19 engine

The DOHC MIVEC 4G19 displaces 1.3–litres and features four valves per cylinder. It produces 90 PS (66 kW; 89 hp) at 5,600 rpm and 121 N⋅m (89 lb⋅ft) of torque at 4,250 rpm. It was introduced in 2002, powering the then-new Mitsubishi Colt.

Applications:

- Mitsubishi Colt

== See also ==
- List of Mitsubishi engines
- List of Hyundai engines
- List of engines used in Chrysler products
