= Zotye T300 =

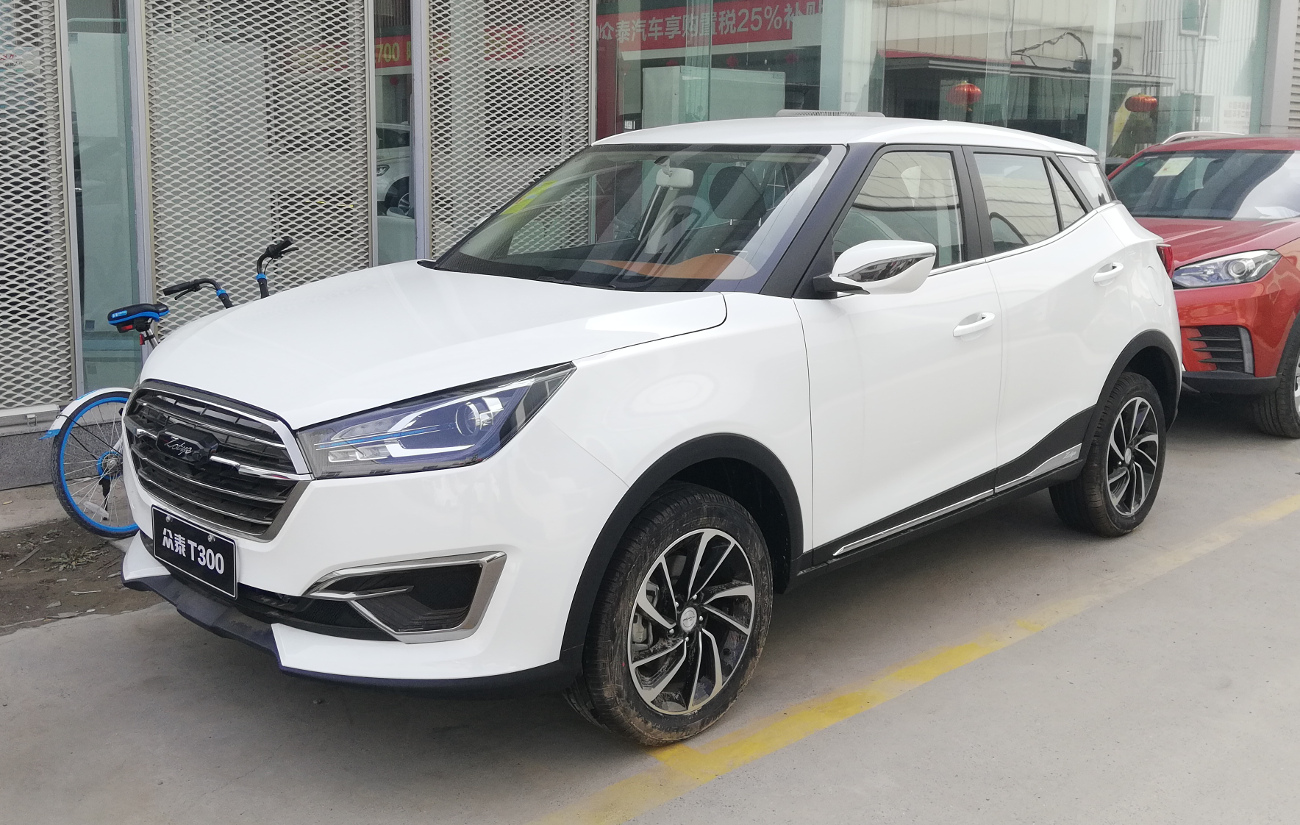

Overview
- Manufacturer: Zotye
- Also called: Pars Khodro DL5 (Iran)
- Production: 2016–2021
- Model years: 2017–2021
- Assembly: China: Chongqing (2016–2024); Iran: Tehran (Pars Khodro)

Body and chassis
- Class: Subcompact crossover SUV (B)
- Body style: 5-door SUV
- Layout: Front-engine, front-wheel-drive layout

Powertrain
- Engine: Petrol: 1.5 L 4G15 I4 turbo
- Transmission: 5-speed manual; CVT

Dimensions
- Wheelbase: 2,600 mm (102.4 in)
- Length: 4,387 mm (172.7 in)
- Width: 1,835 mm (72.2 in)
- Height: 1,642 mm (64.6 in)

The Zotye T300 is a subcompact crossover SUV produced by Zotye Auto.

== Overview ==
Previewed by the T300 concept car during the 2016 Beijing Auto Show, the T300 is positioned under the Zotye T500 compact crossover. The production version was later revealed in early 2017 with the pricing of the Zotye T700 ranging from 60,800 to 80,000 yuan.

In 2025 it was reported that the factory in Chongqing which produces the T300 was auctioned off and no vehicles had been produced for the entire year..

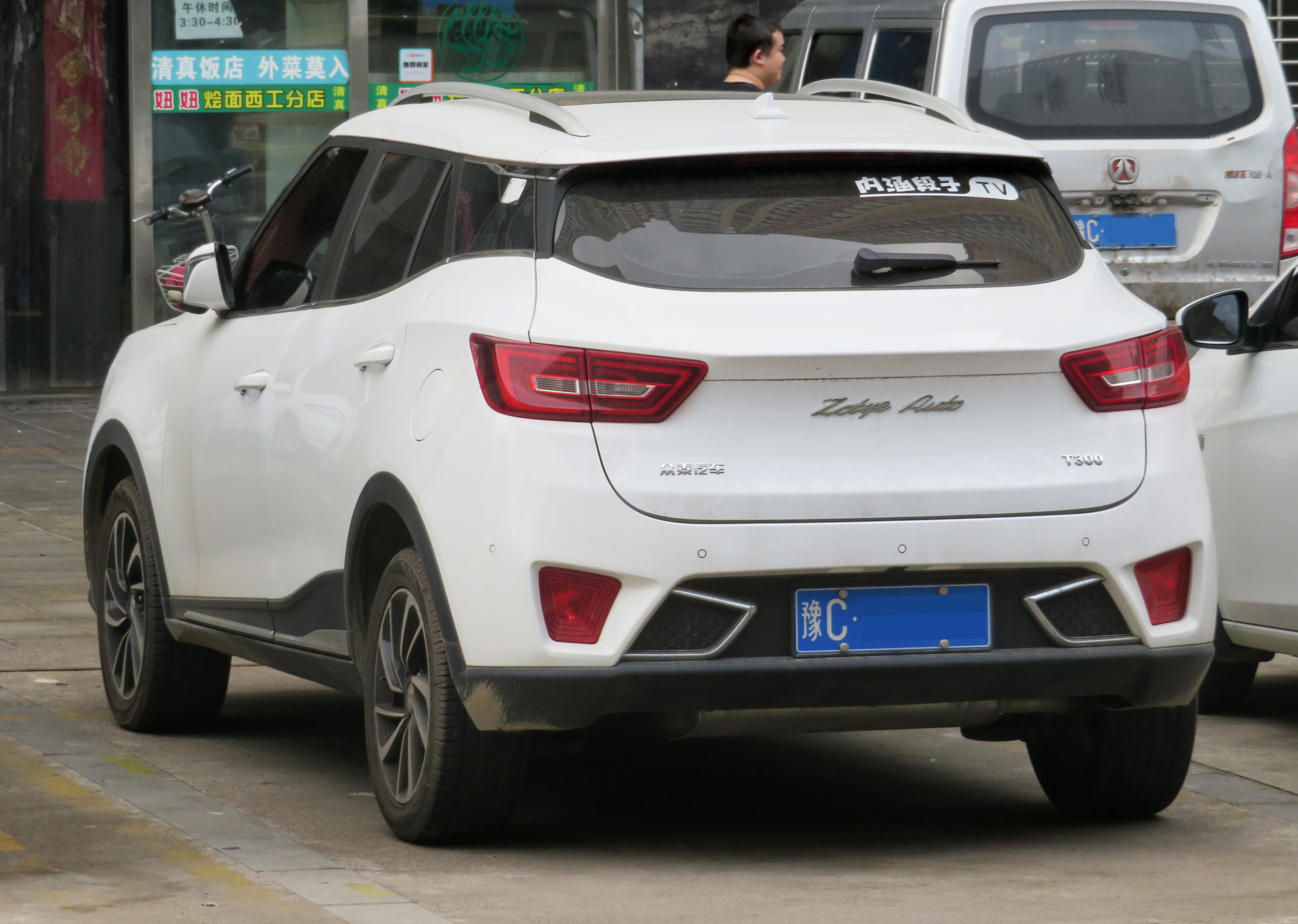
Rear view

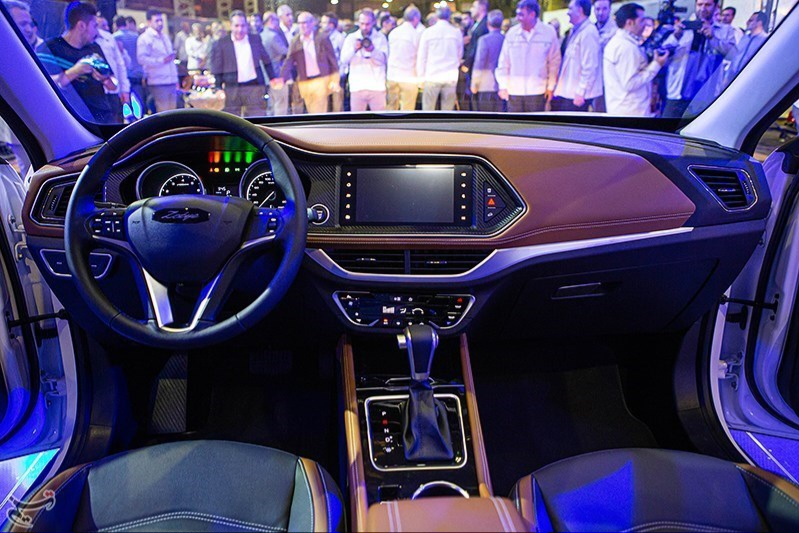
interior

== Powertrain ==
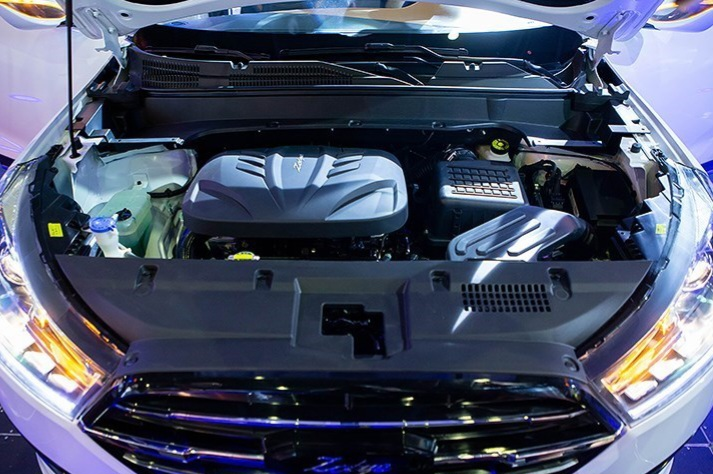
engine

The engine displacements of the T300 is a 1.5 liter engine with a maximum engine power of 82.0 kW, a maximum horsepower of 111PS and maximum torque of 143.0N ·M. Two gearbox options are available with a 5-speed manual and a continuously variable transmission.
