= Zotye T600 =

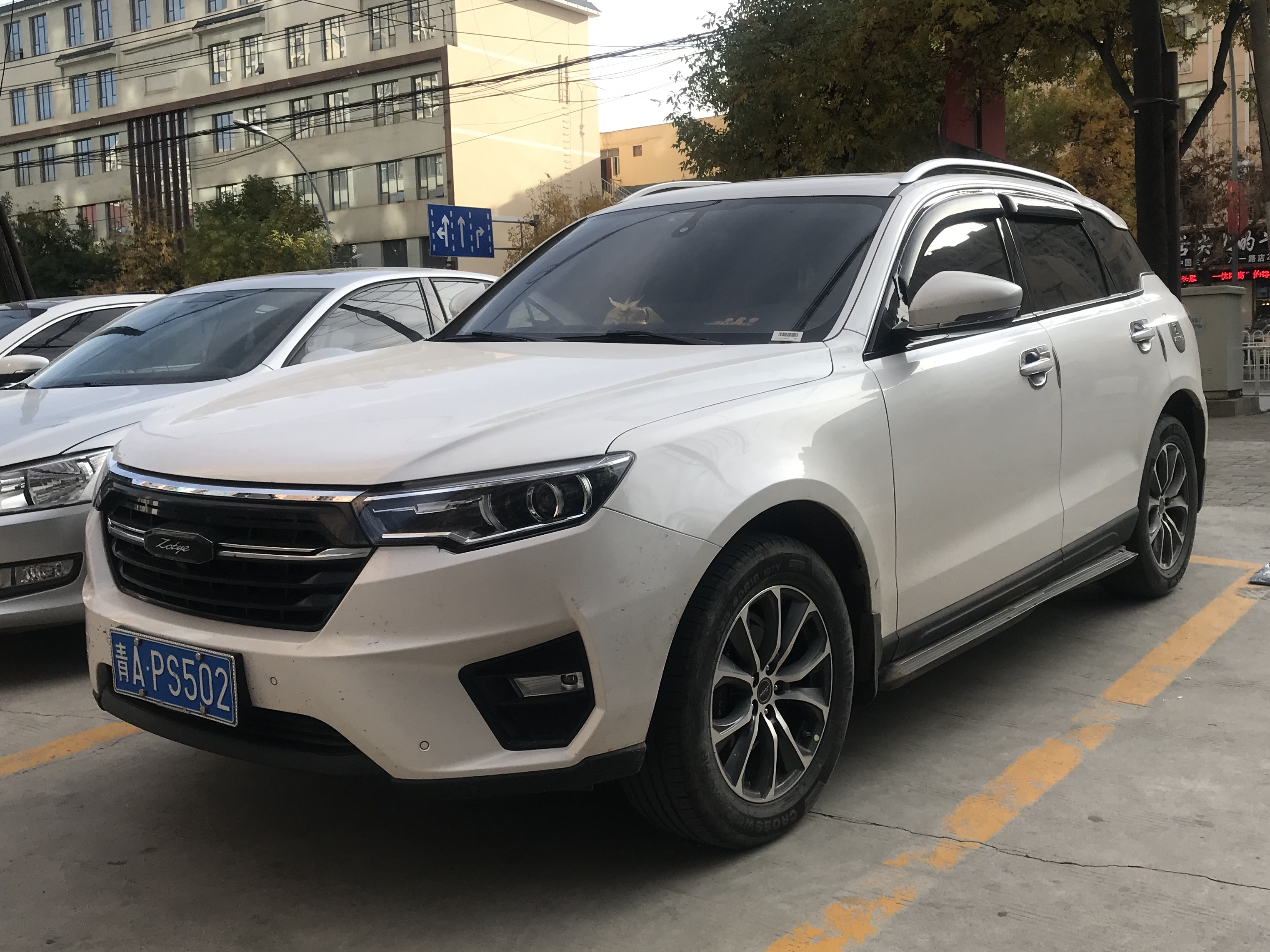

Overview
- Manufacturer: Zotye
- Also called: Rigan Coupa T210 (Iran)
- Production: 2013–present
- Model years: 2014–present (T600); 2016–2020 (T600 Sport); 2017–2020 (T600 Coupe)
- Assembly: China

Body and chassis
- Class: Compact crossover SUV
- Body style: 5-door SUV
- Layout: Front-engine, front-wheel-drive layout

Powertrain
- Engine: Petrol: 1.5 L 15S4G turbo I4 (T600); 1.5 L 4G15 turbo I4; 1.8 L 4G18 turbo I4; 2.0 L 4G63 turbo I4 (T600)
- Transmission: 5-speed manual; 6-speed manual (T600 Coupe); 6-speed automatic; 6-speed DCT; 7-speed DCT

Dimensions
- Wheelbase: 2,807 mm (110.5 in)
- Length: 4,631–4,676 mm (182.3–184.1 in)
- Width: 1,893 mm (74.5 in)
- Height: 1,686–1,696 mm (66.4–66.8 in)
- Curb weight: 1,541–1,661 kg (3,397–3,662 lb)

The Zotye T600 is a compact crossover SUV produced by Zotye Auto.

== Overview ==
The production car debuted in December 2013. Pricing of the T600 ranges from 79,800 yuan to 98,800 yuan. The Zotye T600 is controversial in terms of styling as the styling of the body heavily resembles the Audi Q5, with the front DRG inspired by the Volkswagen Touareg. Initial launch only made the 1.5L turbocharged petrol engine I4 available, and the 2.0L turbocharged petrol engine I4 was only available starting from 2015.

=== 2018 facelift ===
As of 2018, all other T600 variants were discontinued with only the T600 Coupe model remains to be on sale with the name changing to simply T600 and the front and rear end redesigned to adopt to the rest of the Zotye crossover family. An updated T600 with 1.6L turbo engine mated to 6-speed automatic was planned to be the first Zotye vehicle to be sold in the United States, from 2020.

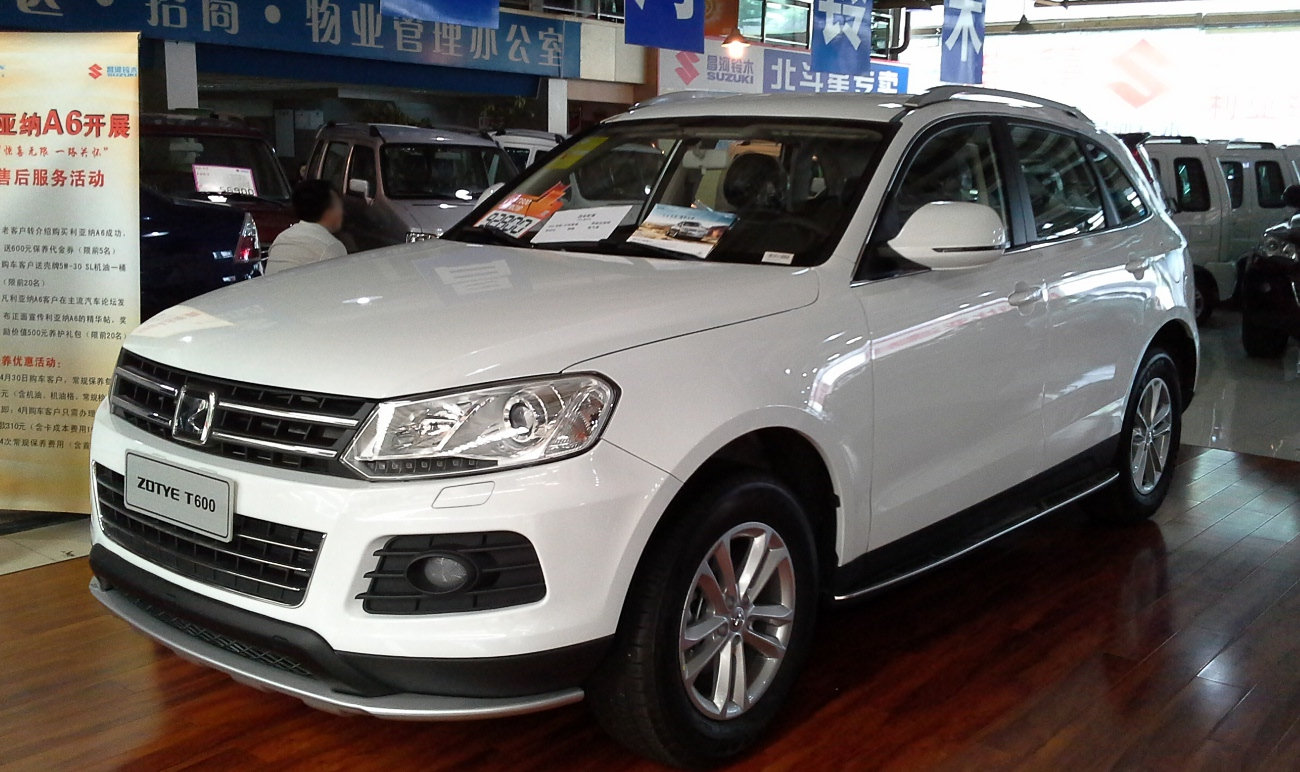
Zotye T600 pre-facelift front

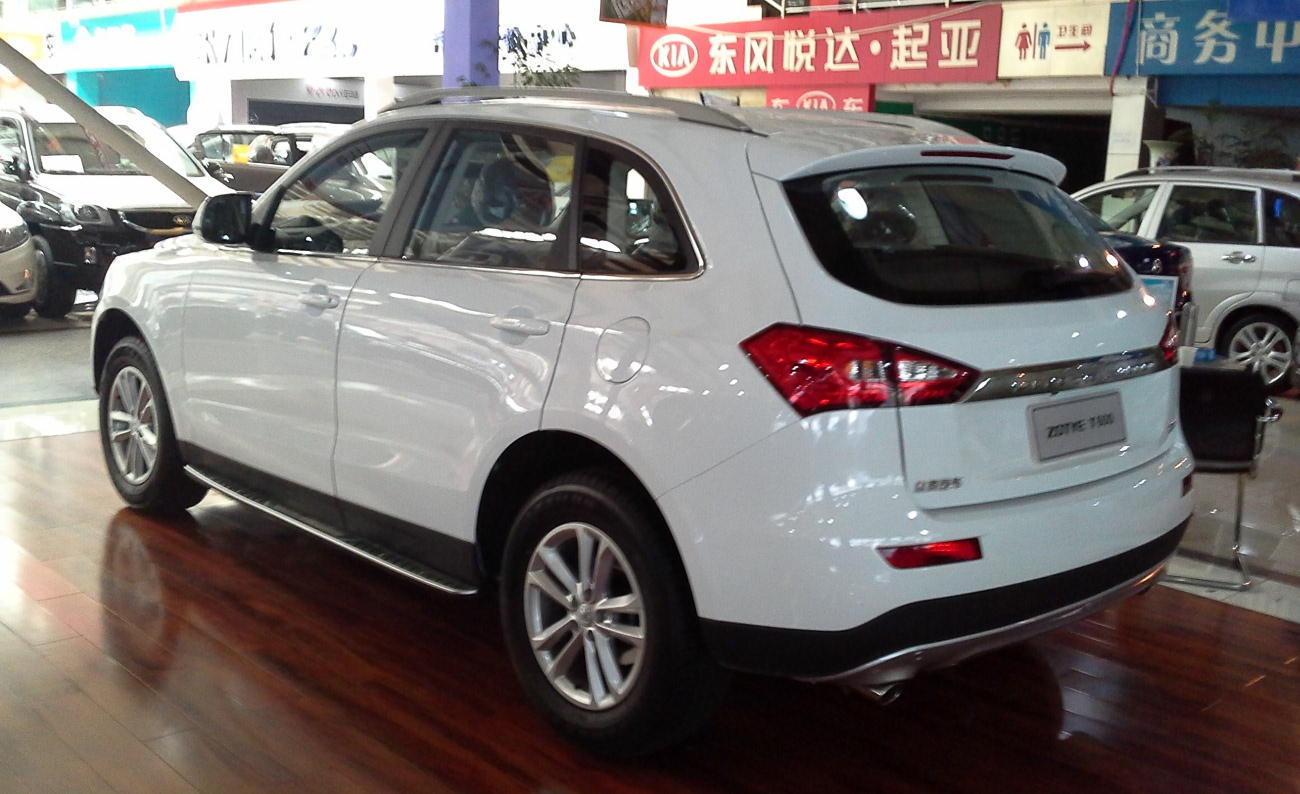
Zotye T600 pre-facelift rear

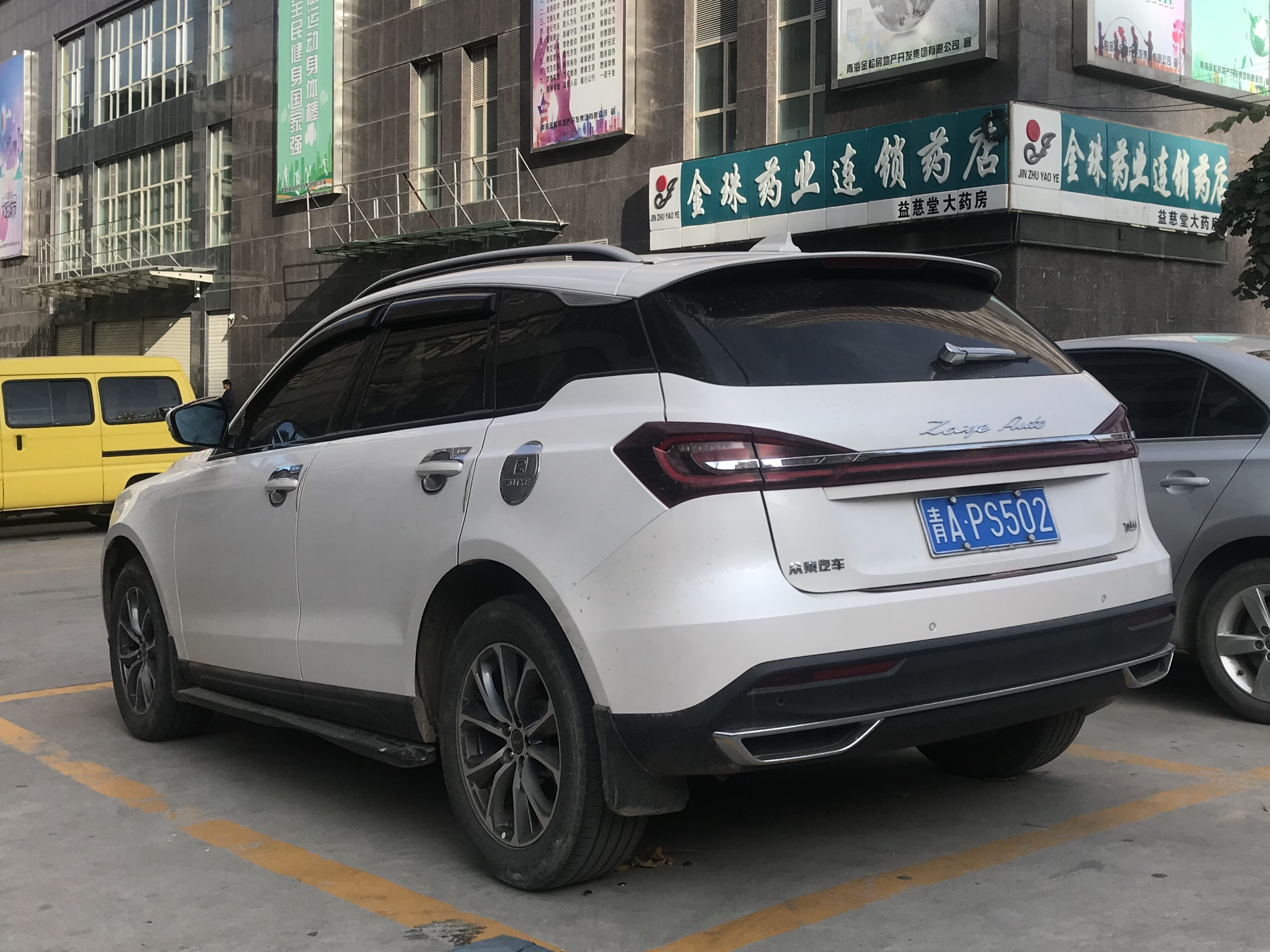
Zotye T600 2018 facelift rear

== Zotye T600 Sport ==
The new Zotye T600 Sport was revealed to the Chinese car market in May 2016. Pricing ranges from 95,800 yuan to 149,800 yuan, making the T600 Sport the high end variant of the base model Zotye T600 SUV.

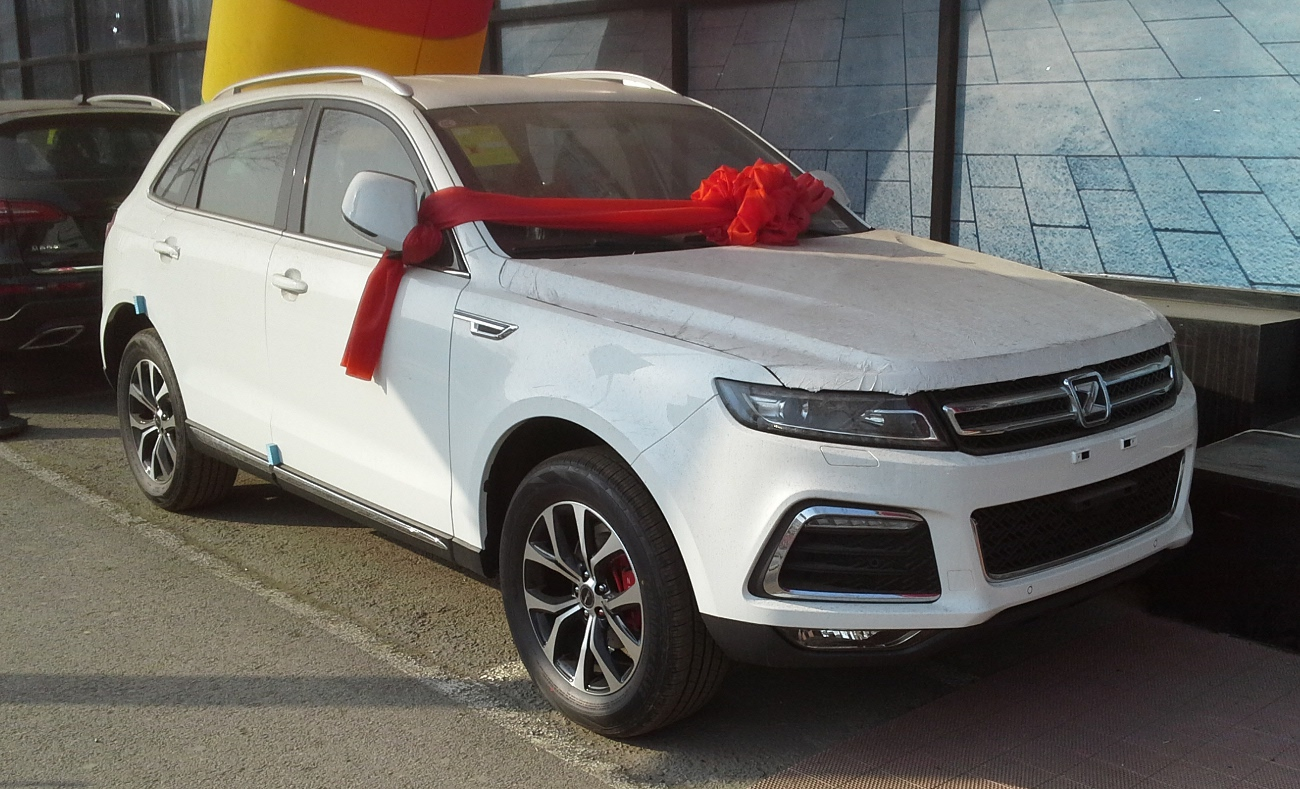
Pre-facelift Zotye T600 Sport front

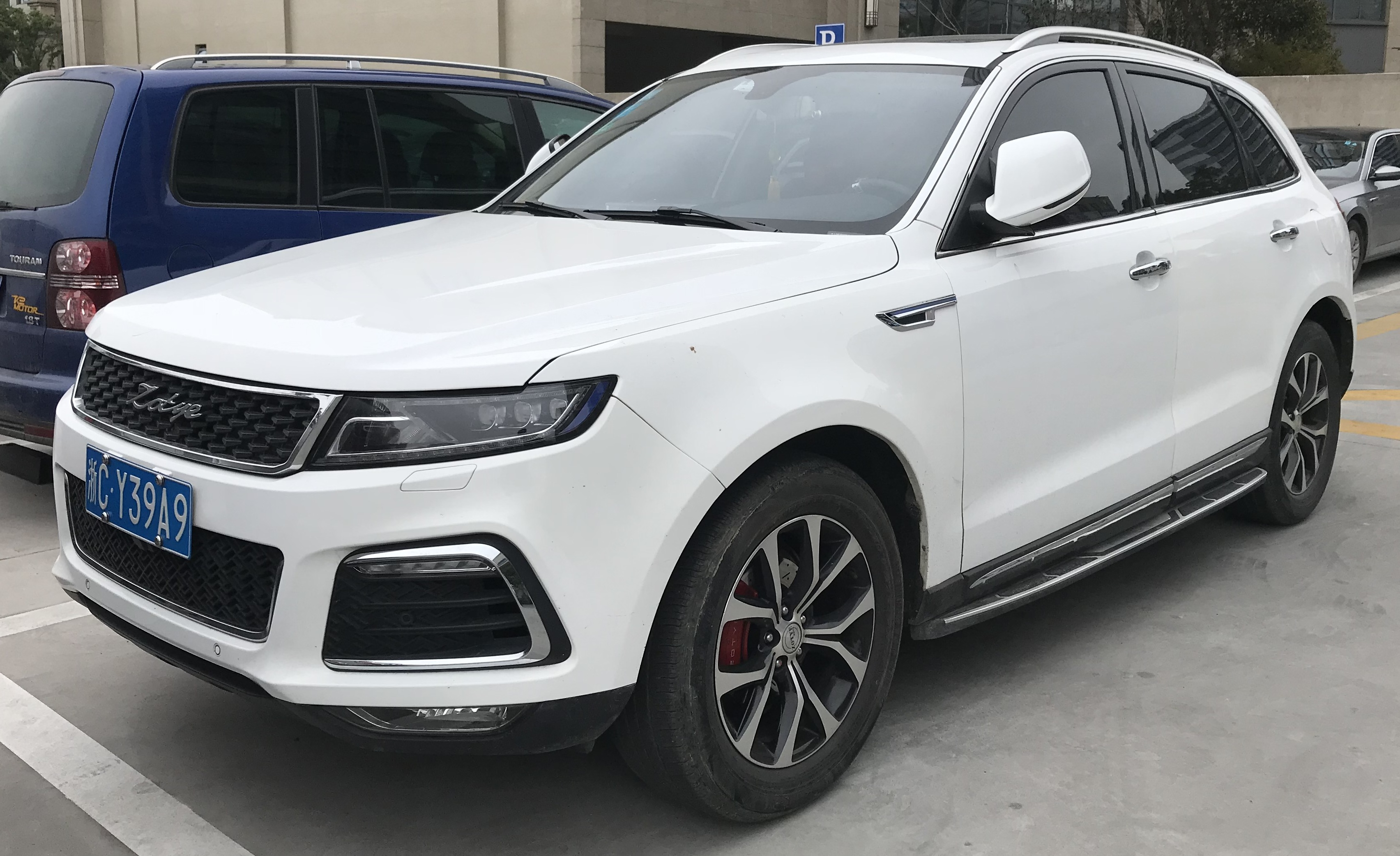
Post-facelift Zotye T600 Sport front

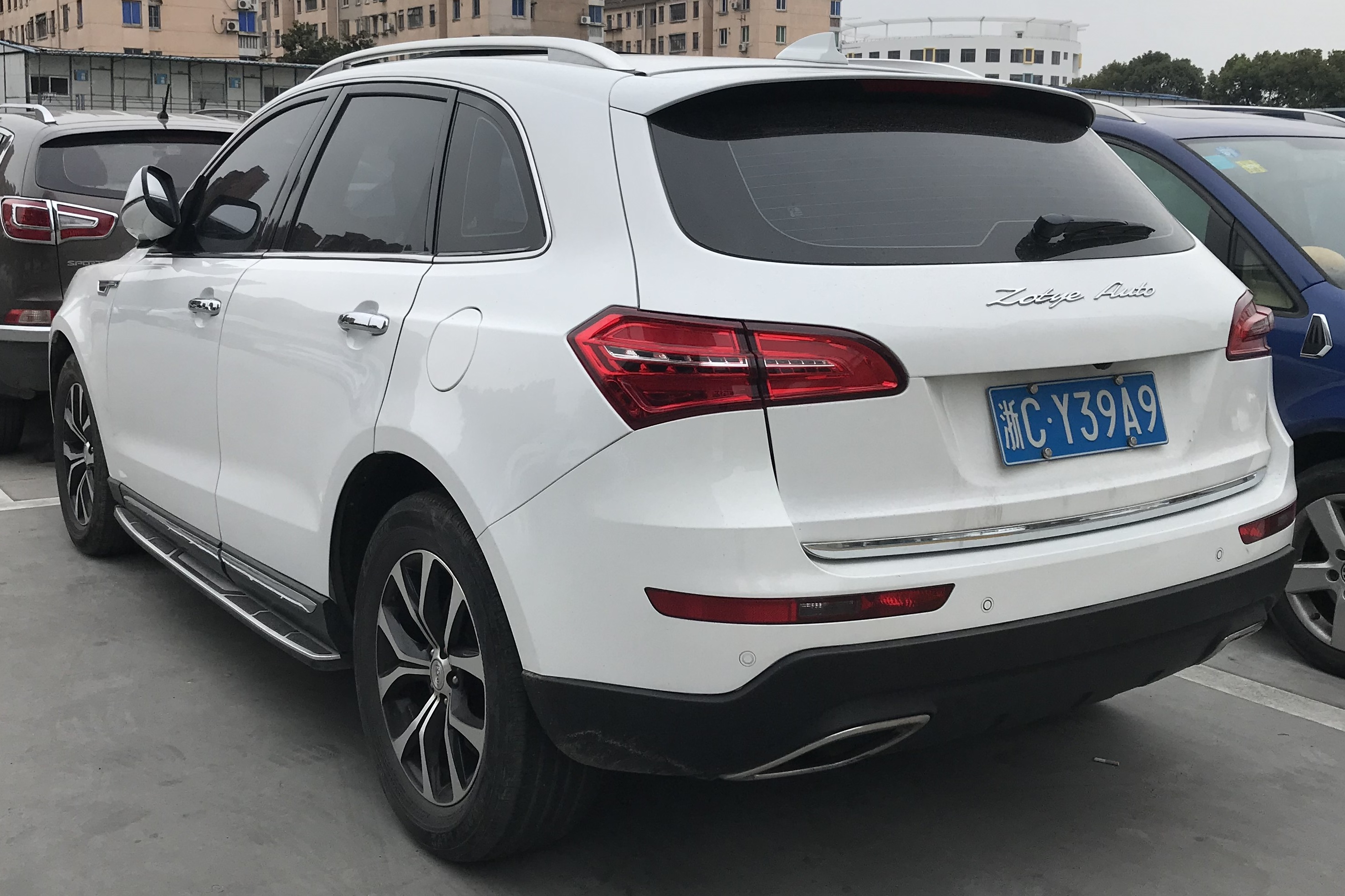
Post-facelift Zotye T600 Sport rear

== Zotye T600 Coupe ==
The Zotye T600 Coupe is based on the Zotye T600. Just like the T600 Sport, the T600 Coupe is also a sportier and higher trim version of the T600, but with slight styling differences most notably with a redesigned interior, at the front with new lights, new grilles, and different DLO plus blacked out D-pillars.

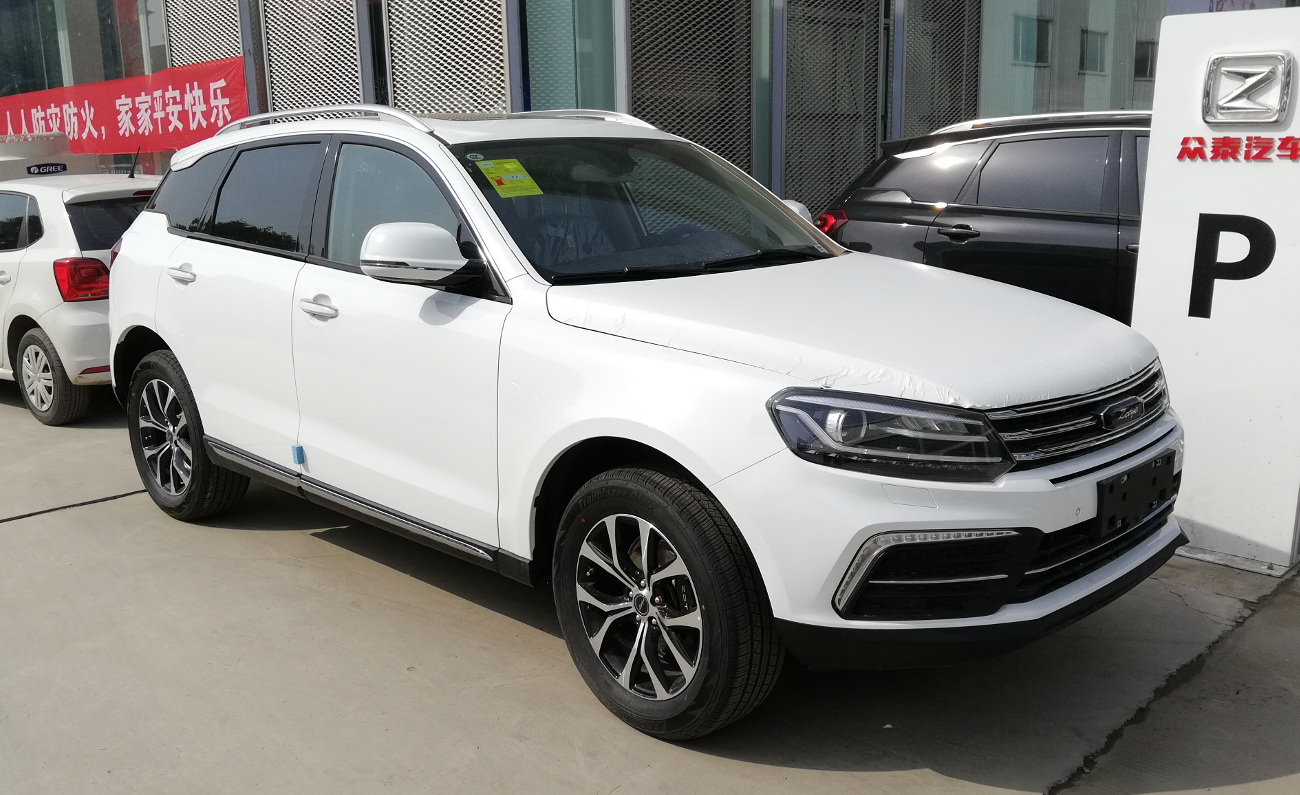
Zotye T600 Coupe front

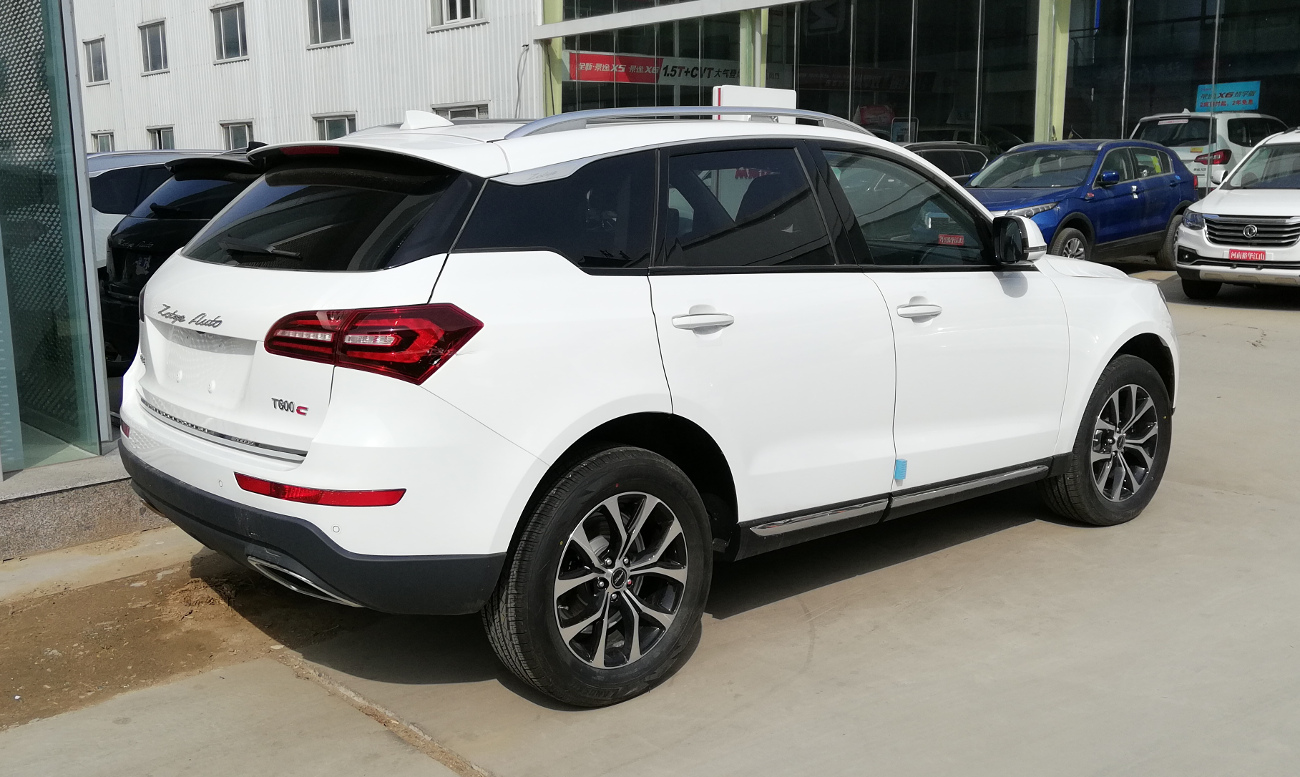
Zotye T600 Coupe rear
