= Zotye 2008 =

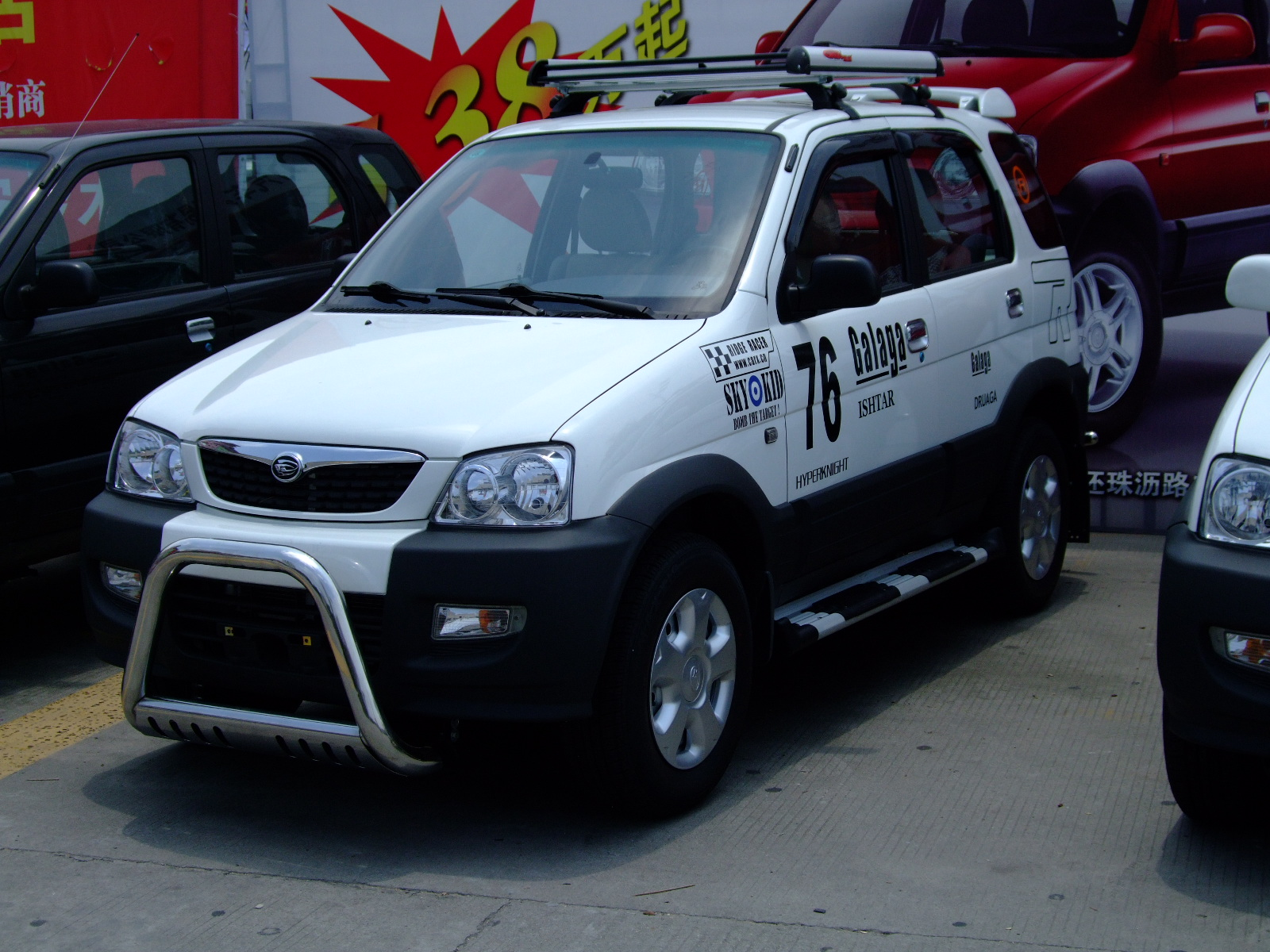

Overview
- Manufacturer: Zotye Auto
- Also called: Autorrad Outsider (Chile); LUIS 4U green (Germany); Premier RiO (India); Zotye 5008; Zotye T200; Zotye Hunter (Export); Zotye Nomad (Export)
- Production: 2005–2016
- Assembly: China: Zhejiang; India: Chinchwad, Pune (Premier)

Body and chassis
- Class: Mini SUV
- Related: Daihatsu Terios

Powertrain
- Engine: Petrol: 1.3 L 4G13 I4; 1.5 L 4G15 I4; 1.6 L 4G18 I4
- Transmission: 5-speed manual; CVT (1.5-litre only)

Dimensions
- Wheelbase: 2,420 mm (95.3 in)
- Length: 3,900 mm (153.5 in)
- Width: 1,555 mm (61.2 in)
- Height: 1,670 mm (65.7 in)
- Kerb weight: 1,130 kg (2,491 lb)

The Zotye 2008 is a small 5-door SUV produced by Zotye Auto. A facelifted version is sold as the Zotye 5008, and is known in export markets as Nomad and Hunter. The car is named in honour of the 2008 Summer Olympics in Beijing and also goes by the model project number XS6402.

It was reported that Zotye had bought the tools and parts of the first generation Terios model from Daihatsu in Taiwan when Daihatsu launched the second generation model. Daihatsu Terios is sold in China as the Huali Dario which is made by the Tianjin FAW.

Although it has been alleged that the car is a copy of the which firm, and it has been noted that whilst the front treatment of the grille differs considerably, the rear of the car is nearly identical, the presses for the body panels and associated parts were in fact purchased from Japan in 2006 when Daihatsu launched the new generation Terios.

A facelifted Zotye 5008 was produced as the Zotye T200 from 2013 with a new front and rear, and a revised interior. Production for the T200 ended in 2016.

== Specification ==
Engine designs were purchased from Mitsubishi, uses a range of Mitsubishi-derived fuel-injected 4-cylinder engines dubbed 4G13 and 4G15.

The 2008 is fitted with a 1.3L, producing 65 kW and 115 Nm and can reach a top speed of 140 km/h.

The 5008 is available with a choice of 4-cylinder 16-valve engines and made in Japan, 1.3L or 1.5L or 1.6L engines, with manual or automatic transmission, CVT on the 1.5L. The 1.3 produces 68 kW and 113 Nm, and the 1.5 produces 78 kW and 134 Nm, and can reach a top speed of 145 km/h.

== Export markets ==
The car was launched in various overseas markets including South Africa in 2008. Initially sold as the Nomad with 1.3L and 1.5L engines, it is now sold as the facelifted Hunter and is powered by the same engine as the 1.5L 5008, and is rear-drive only despite its off-roader appearance.

In India, this vehicle known as the Premier RiO was sold from 2009, and assembled by Premier Automobiles Limited. It was powered by a Peugeot diesel and petrol engine and since 2012 had a Fiat 1.3 Multijet diesel option.

== Gallery ==
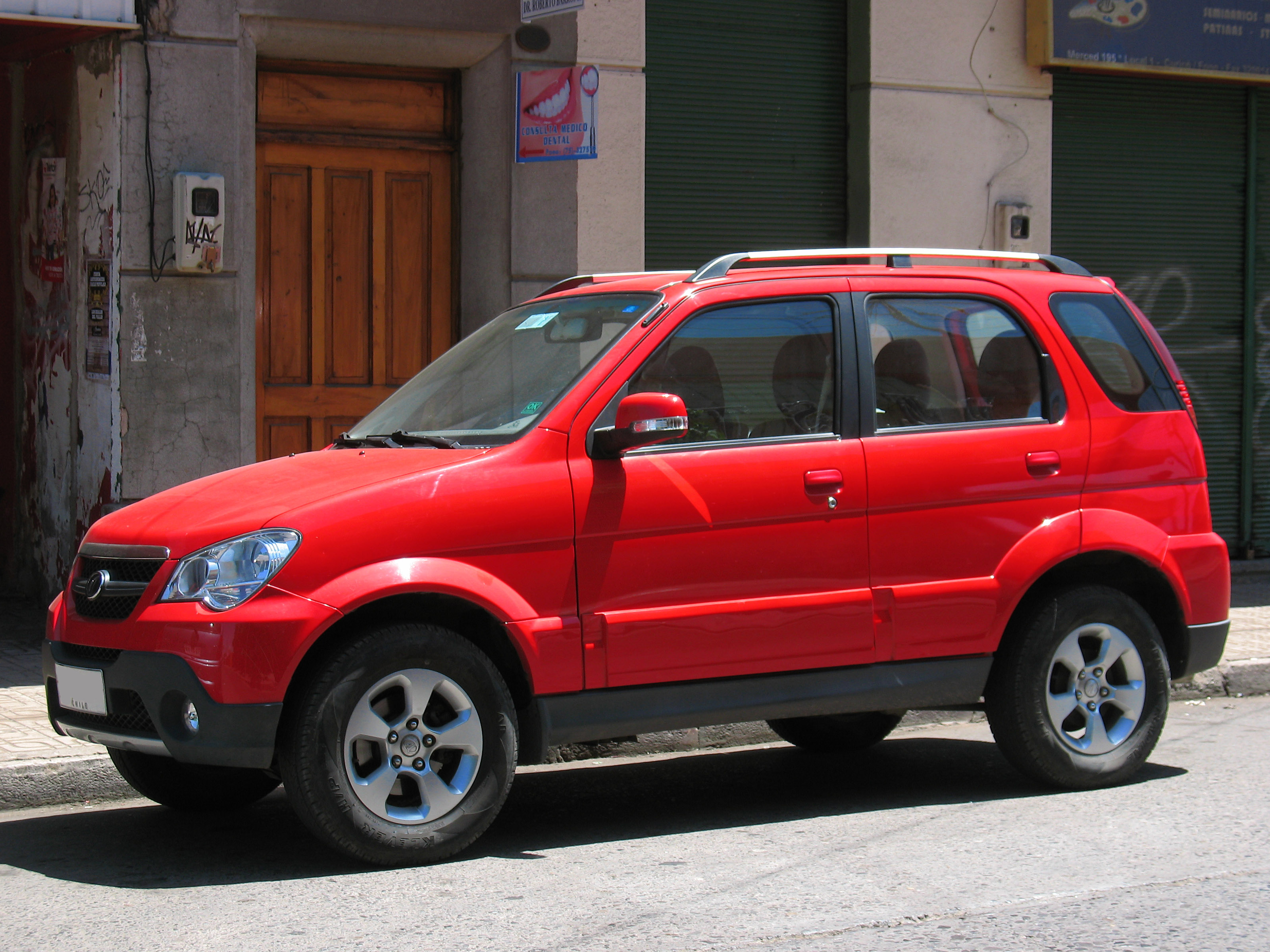
Zotye Hunter

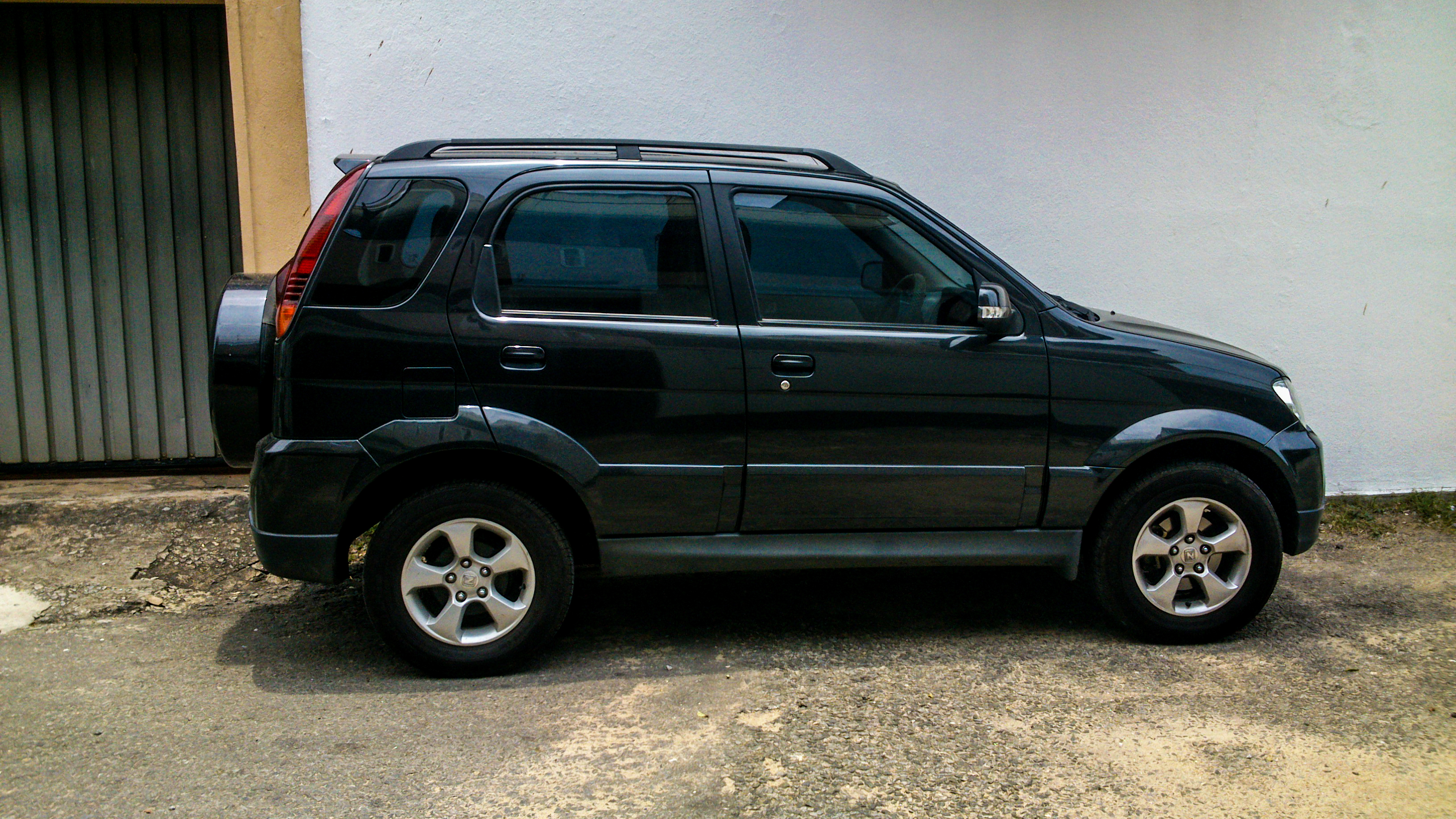
Zotye Nomad

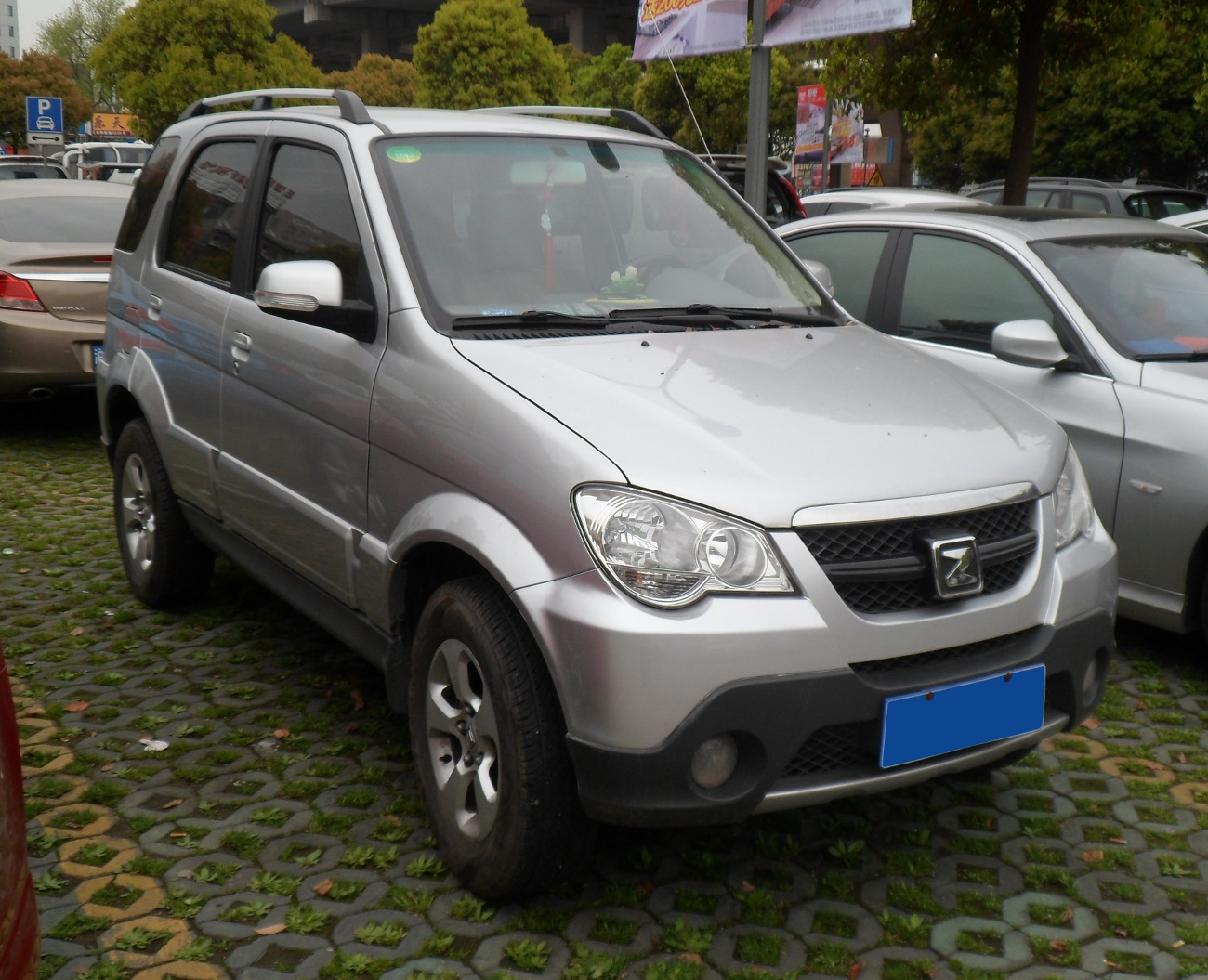
Zotye 5008 front

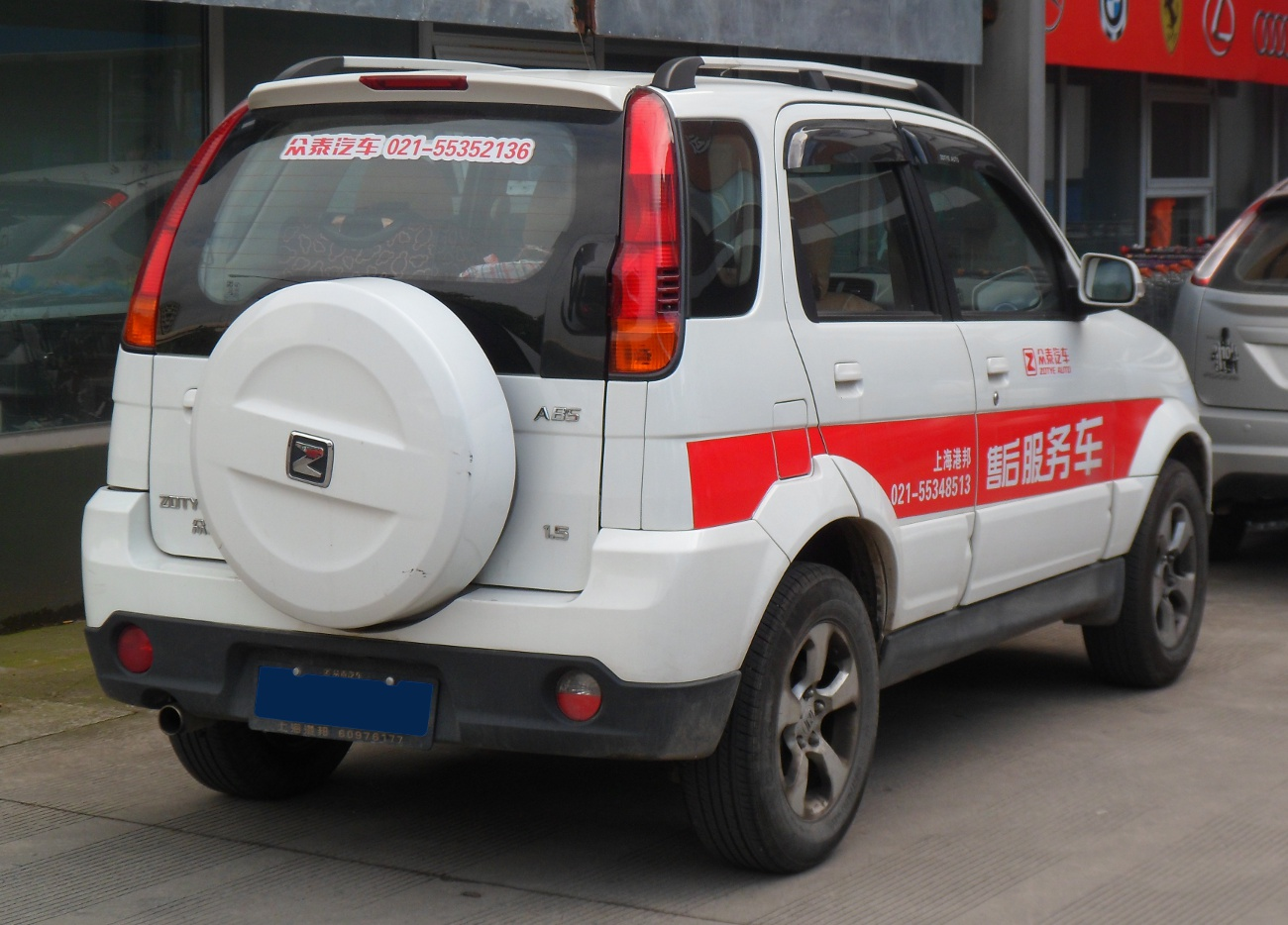
Zotye 5008 rear

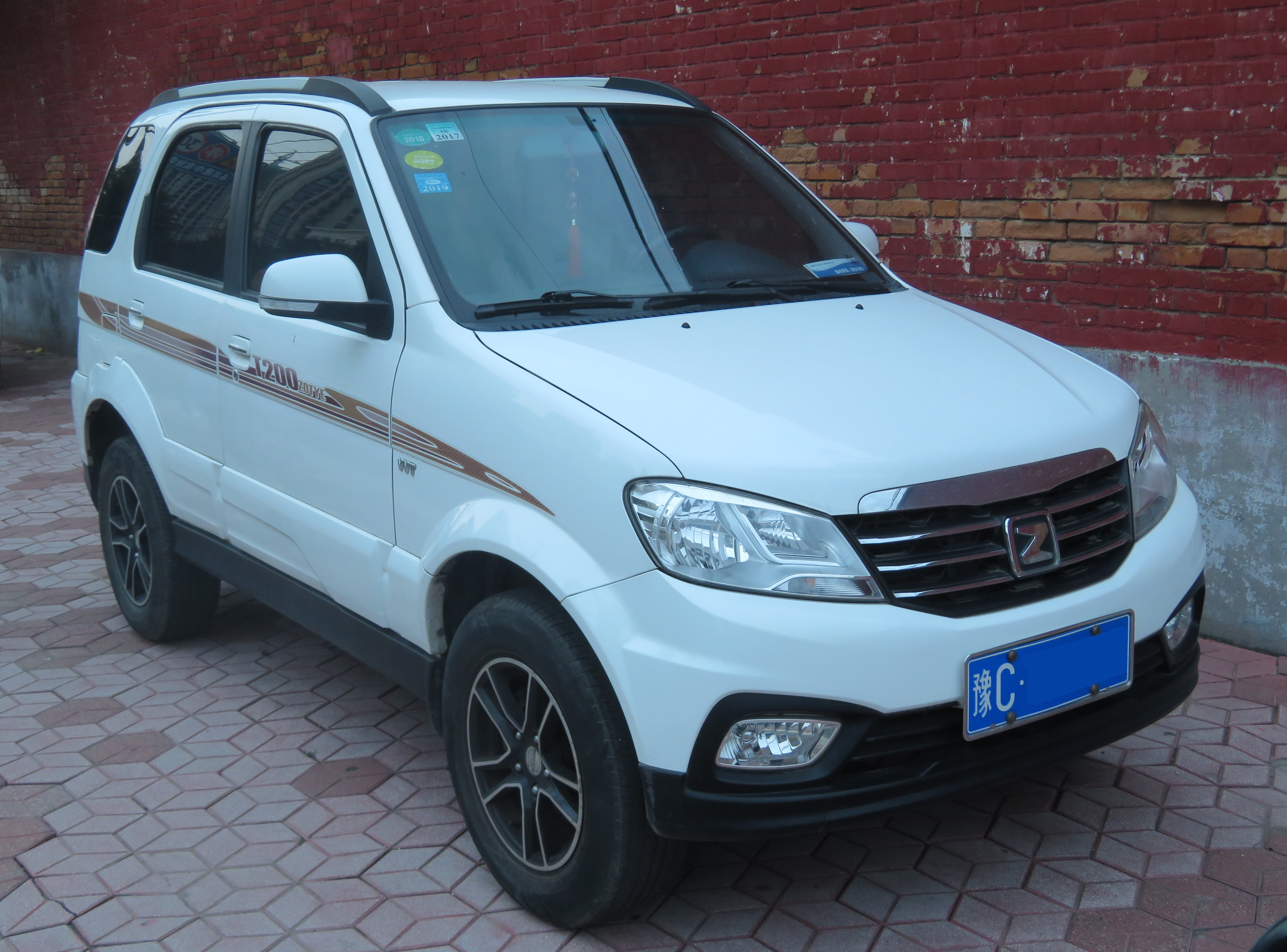
Zotye T200 front

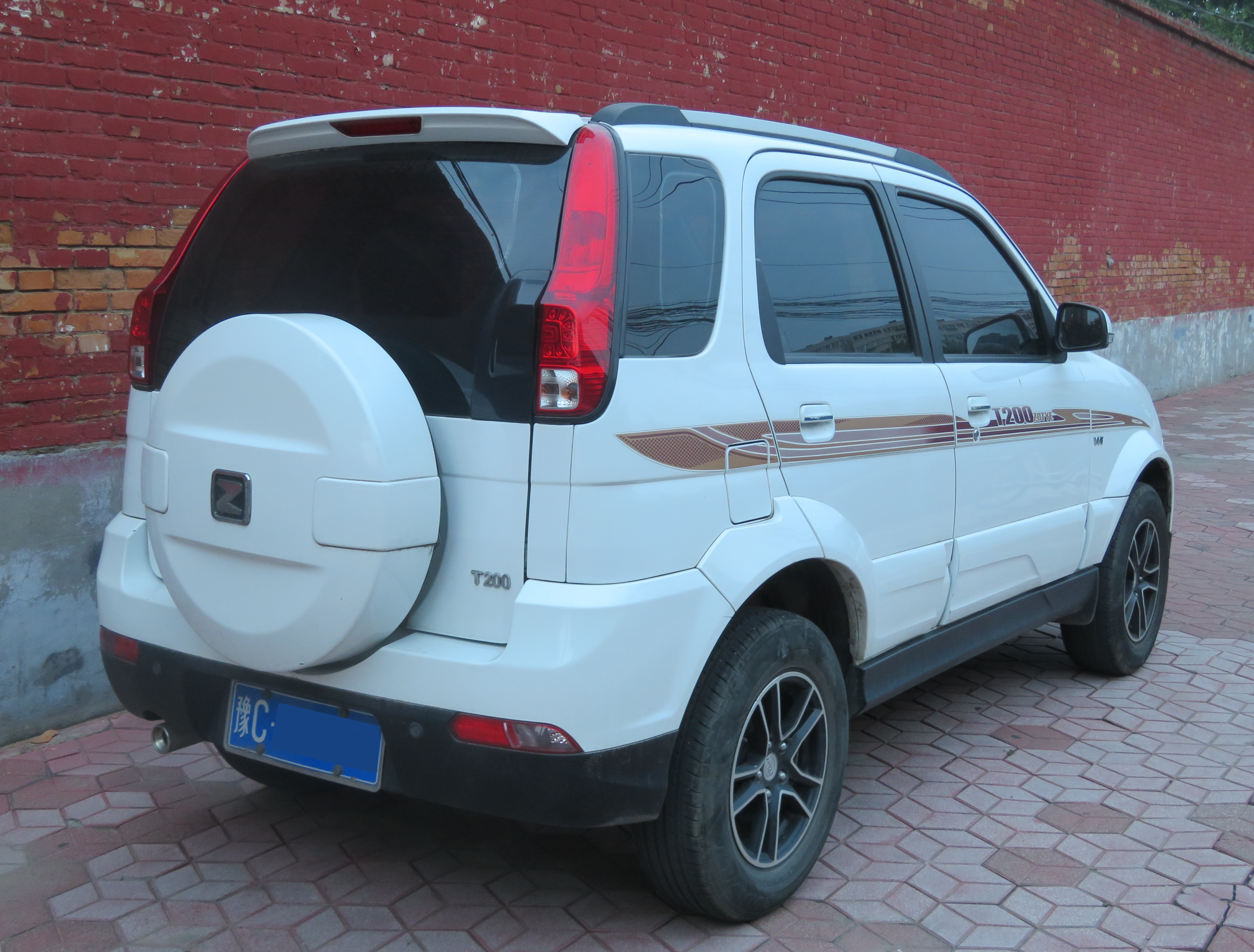
Zotye T200 rear

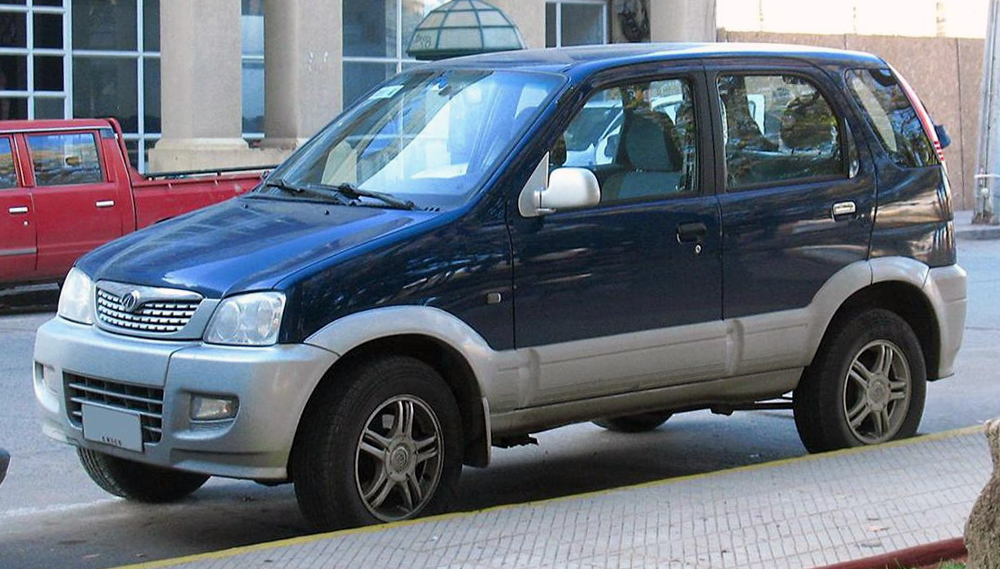
Autorrad Outsider (Chile)

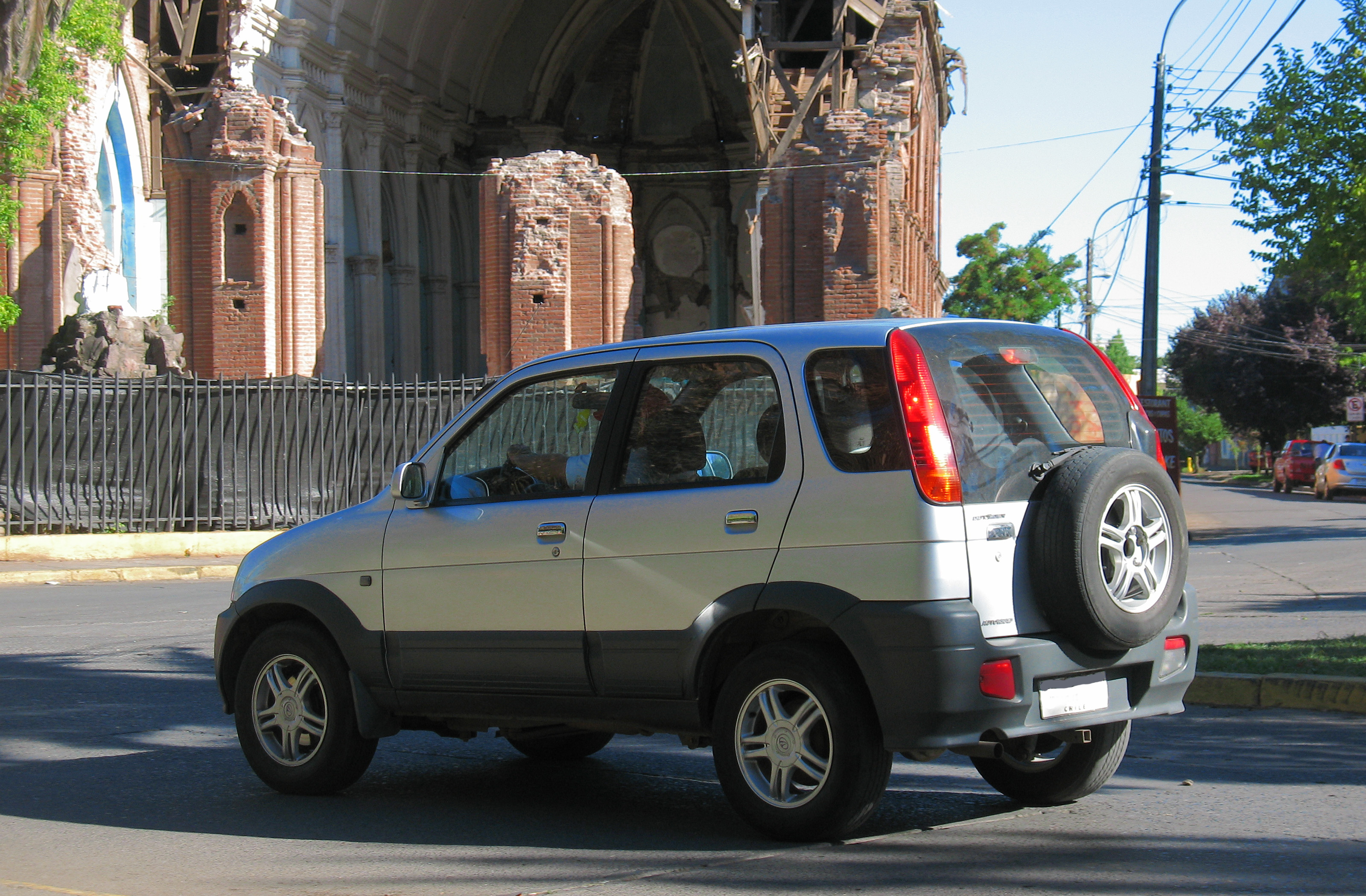
Autorrad Outsider (Chile)

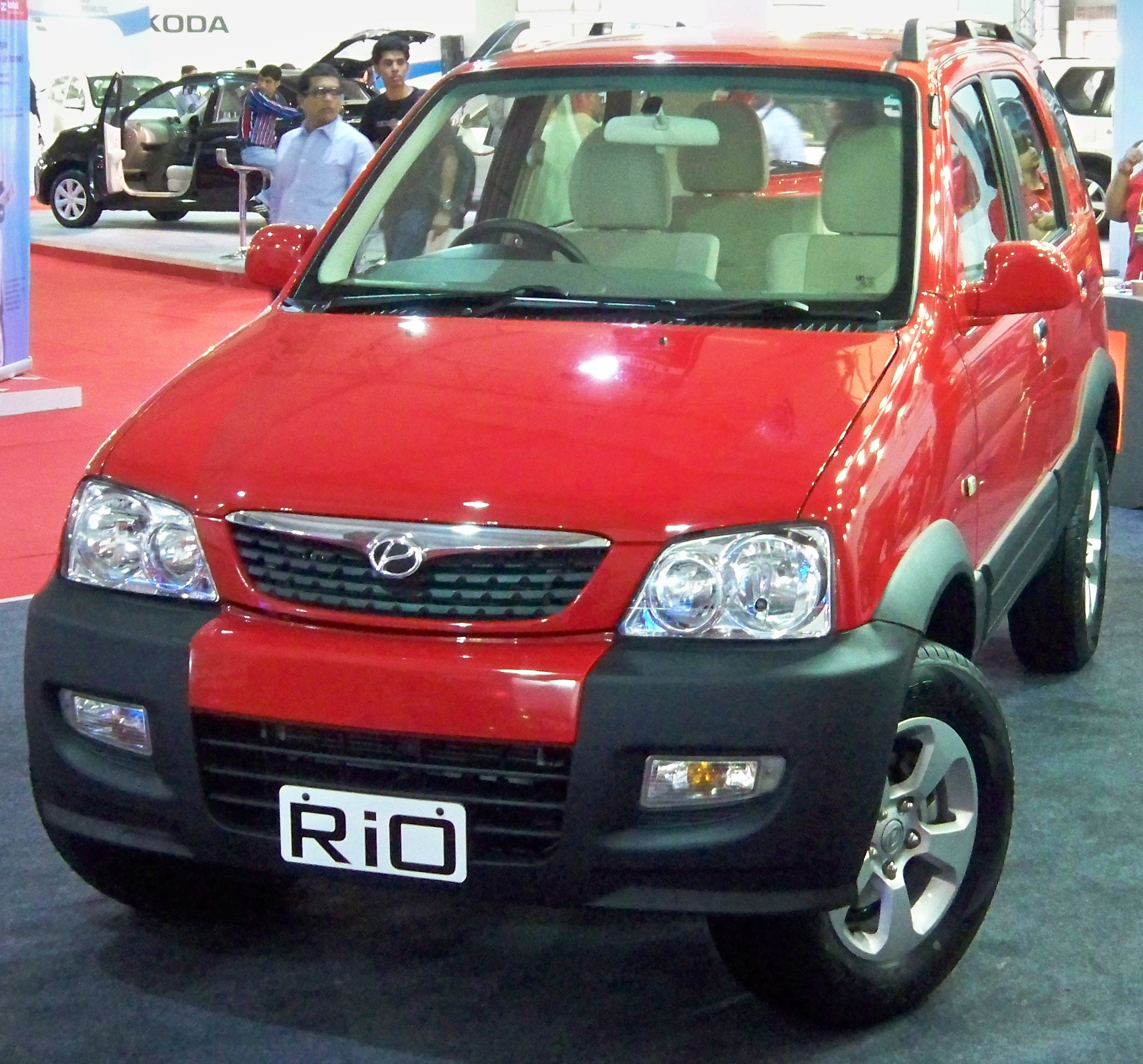
Premier RiO (India)
