= Mitsubishi Mirage Dingo =

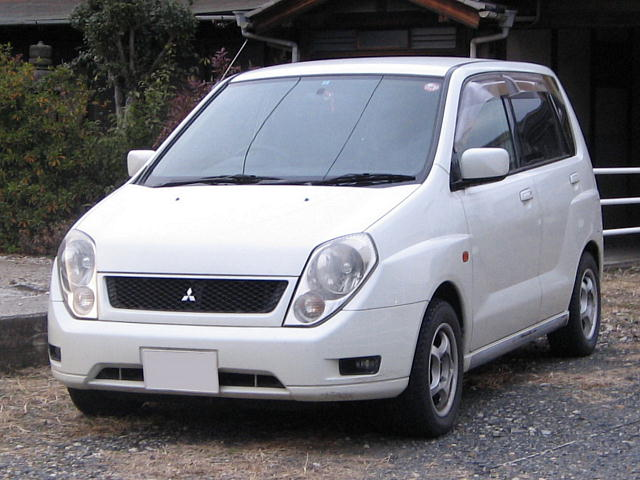
- Pre-facelift Mitsubishi Mirage Dingo

Overview
- Manufacturer: Mitsubishi Motors
- Also called: Hafei Saima (China)
- Production: 1998–2003; 2001–2014 (China)
- Assembly: Japan; China: Harbin (Hafei)

Body and chassis
- Class: Mini MPV
- Body style: 5-door hatchback

Powertrain
- Engine: 4G13 1.3 L I4; 4G15 1.5 L GDI I4; 4G93 1.8 L GDI I4 (2000–03)
- Transmission: INVECS-II 4-speed automatic (1998–2000); 4-speed automatic (2000–03); INVECS-III CVT (2000–03)

Dimensions
- Wheelbase: 2,440 mm (96.1 in)
- Length: 3,885–3,920 mm (153.0–154.3 in)
- Width: 1,695 mm (66.7 in)
- Height: 1,620–1,635 mm (63.8–64.4 in)
- Curb weight: 1,170–1,280 kg (2,579.4–2,821.9 lb)

Chronology
- Successor: Mitsubishi Colt

The Mitsubishi Mirage Dingo is a mini MPV built by Mitsubishi Motors from 1998 to 2003, using a shortened version of the Mirage platform.

== Overview ==
The "Dingo" name is derived from Bingo and its connotations of good fortune, but with the B replaced by D to represent Mitsubishi's Diamond logo. The "Dingo" name also sourced from a wild dog native to Australia, dingo (Canis lupus dingo). In Japan, it was sold at a specific retail chain called Car Plaza. The Dingo's exterior and interior is highly similar to the Mitsubishi Dion, which is another MPV sold in Japan.

As with most direct competitors in the market segment, accommodation is limited to two rows and five seats. The rear bench is split 50-50, with each section having the ability to be slid forwards or backwards individually. Alternatively, folding or detaching the rear chairs provide a large and flat storage area. The rear seats can also be flipped downward to form a pair of beds. Because the gearshift is column-mounted, there is no transmission tunnel, thus enabling occupants to walk between the front and rear seats.

Initially available with the 4G15 "Orion" 1.5 L GDI powerplant mated to an INVECS-II 4-speed automatic, a smaller 1.3 L version (without GDI) and a larger 4G93 1.8 L version were introduced with a facelift in 2000, as well as Mitsubishi's INVECS-III continuously variable transmission.

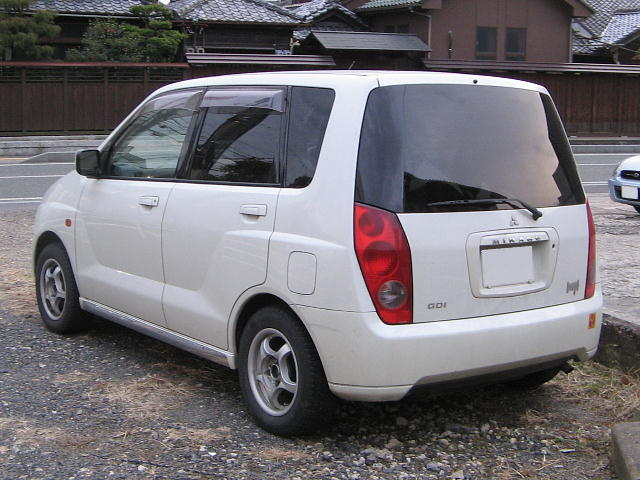
Pre-facelift Mitsubishi Mirage Dingo

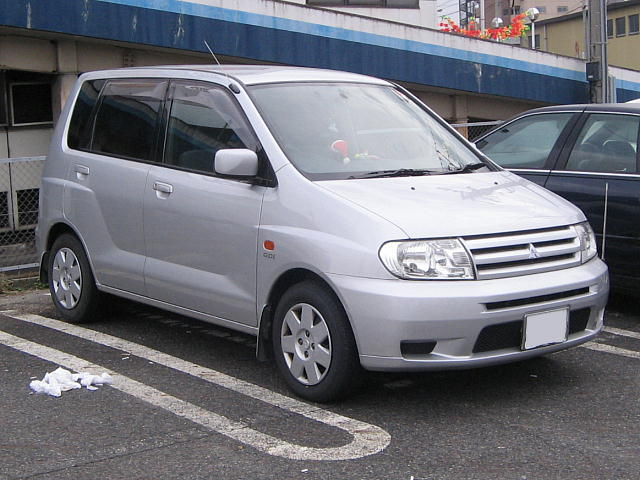
Facelift Mitsubishi Mirage Dingo

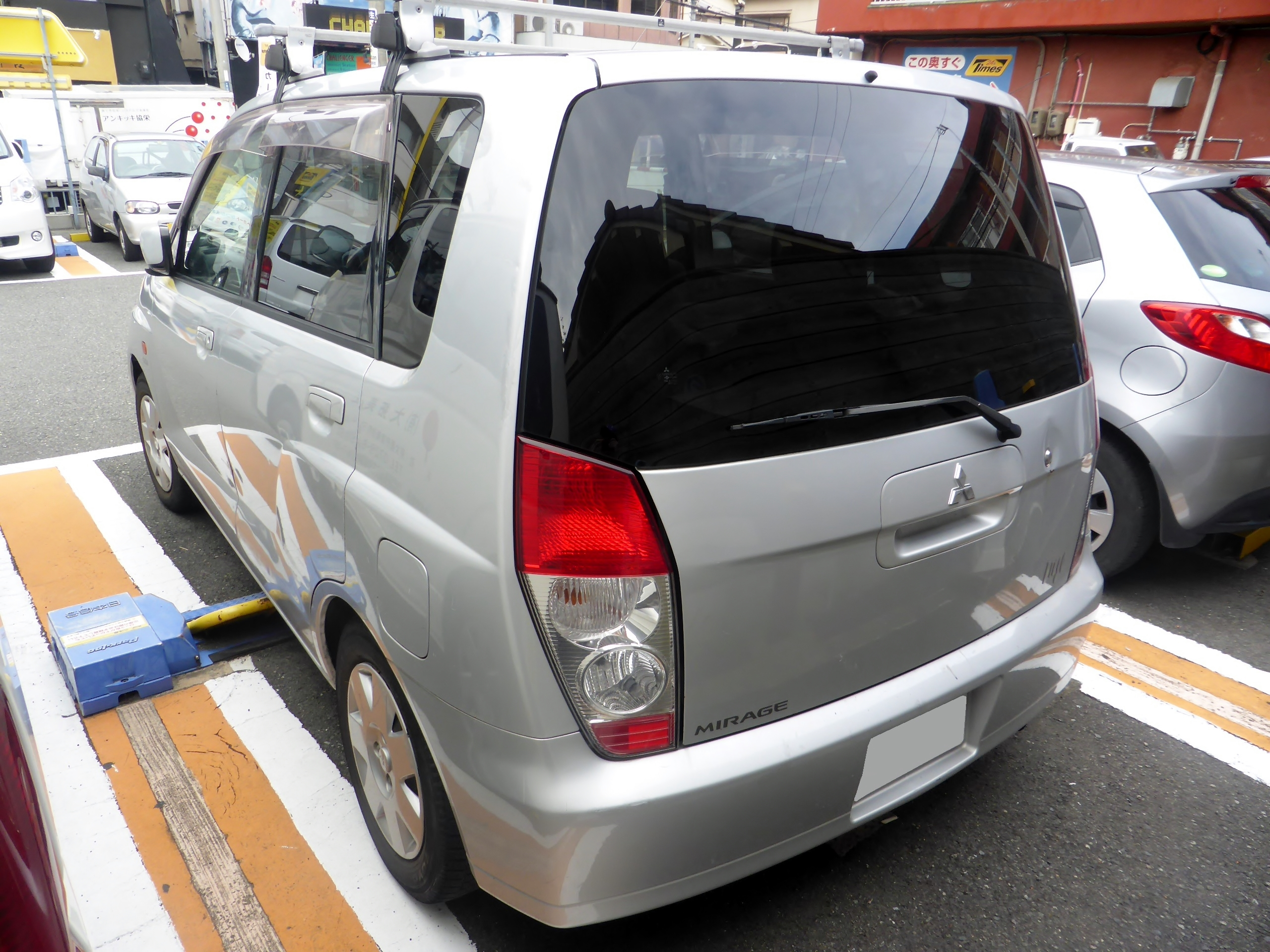
Facelift Mitsubishi Mirage Dingo

== Hafei Saima ==
In the Chinese market, the Mirage Dingo was license-built and marketed as the Hafei Saima from April 2001 to 2014.

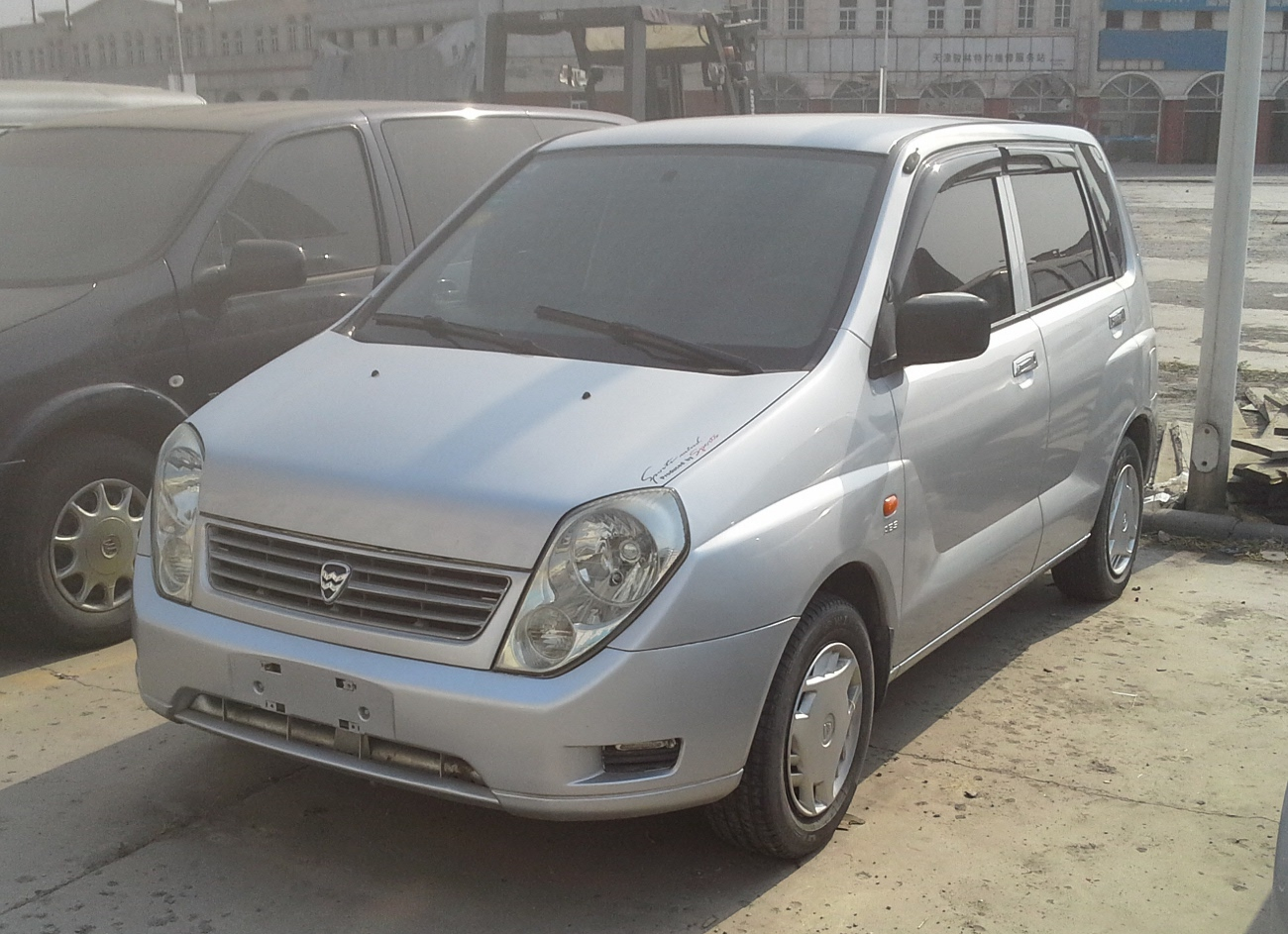
Hafei Saima (China)

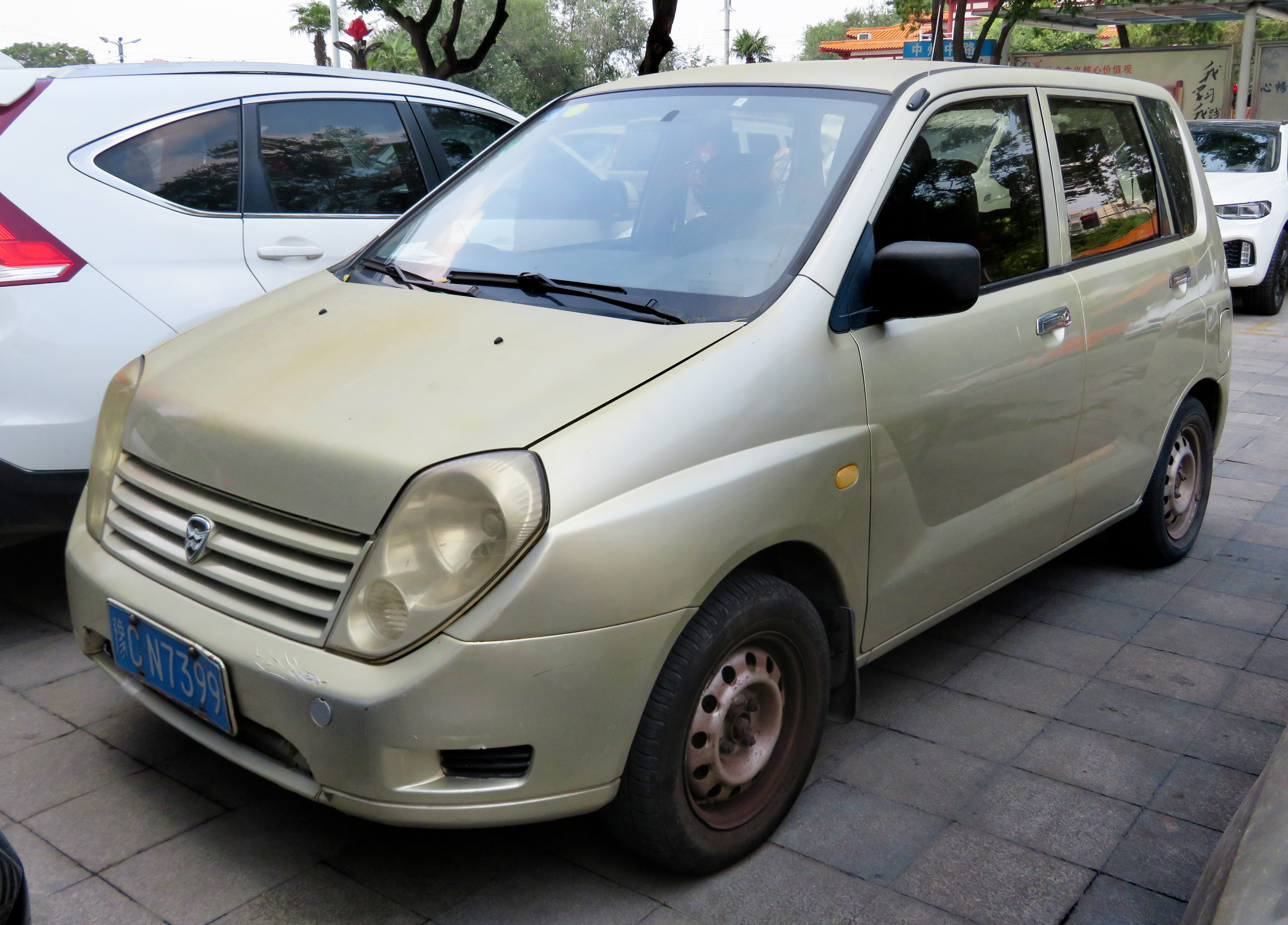
2004 Hafei Saima (China)

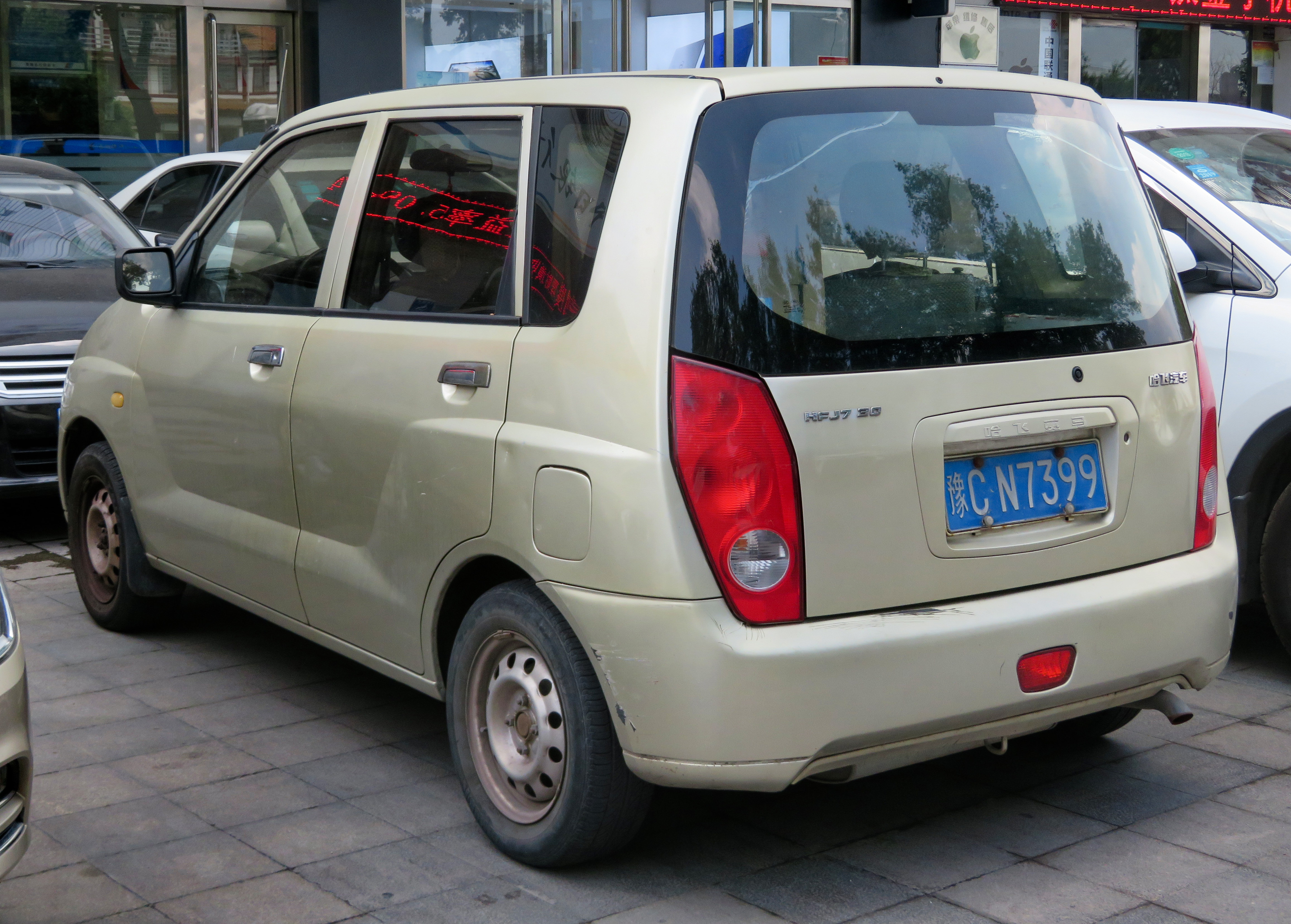
2004 Hafei Saima (China)

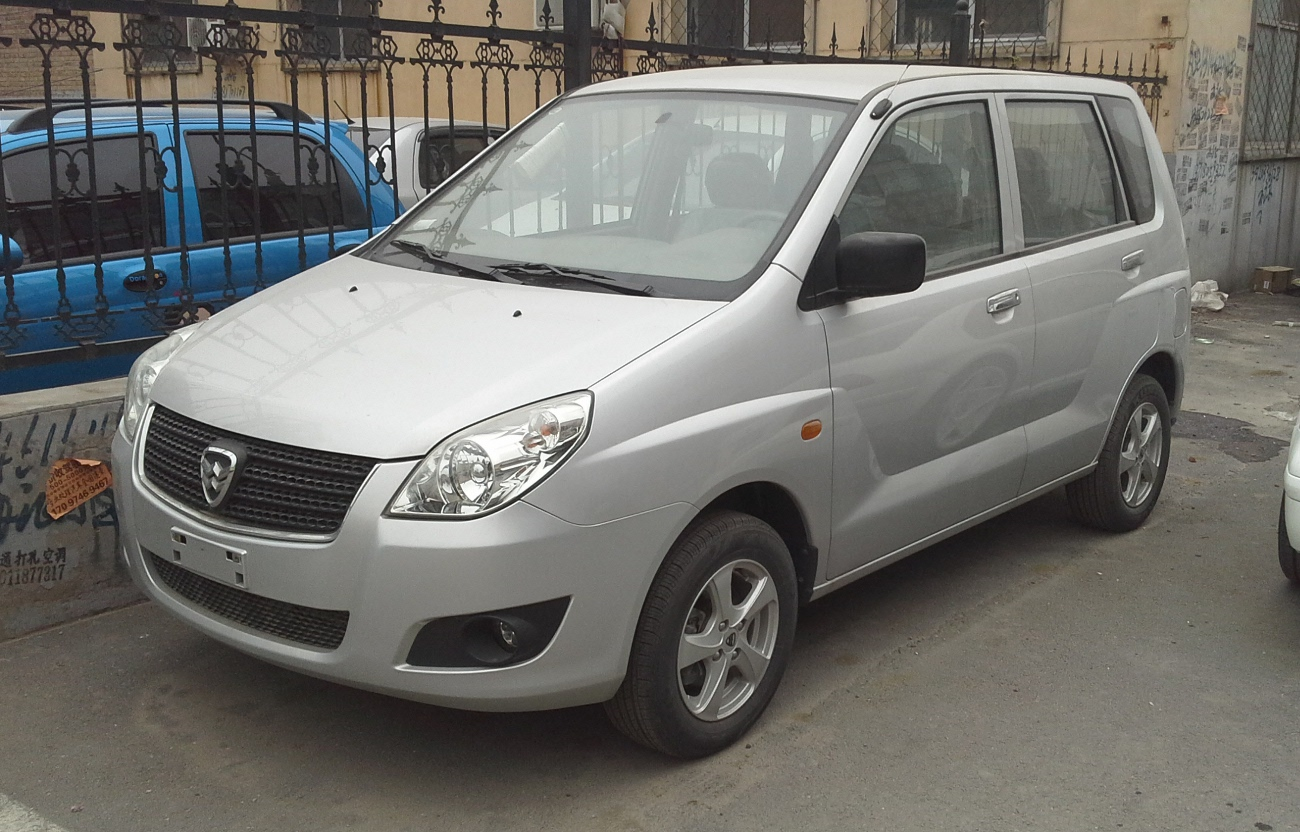
Hafei Saima facelift (China)

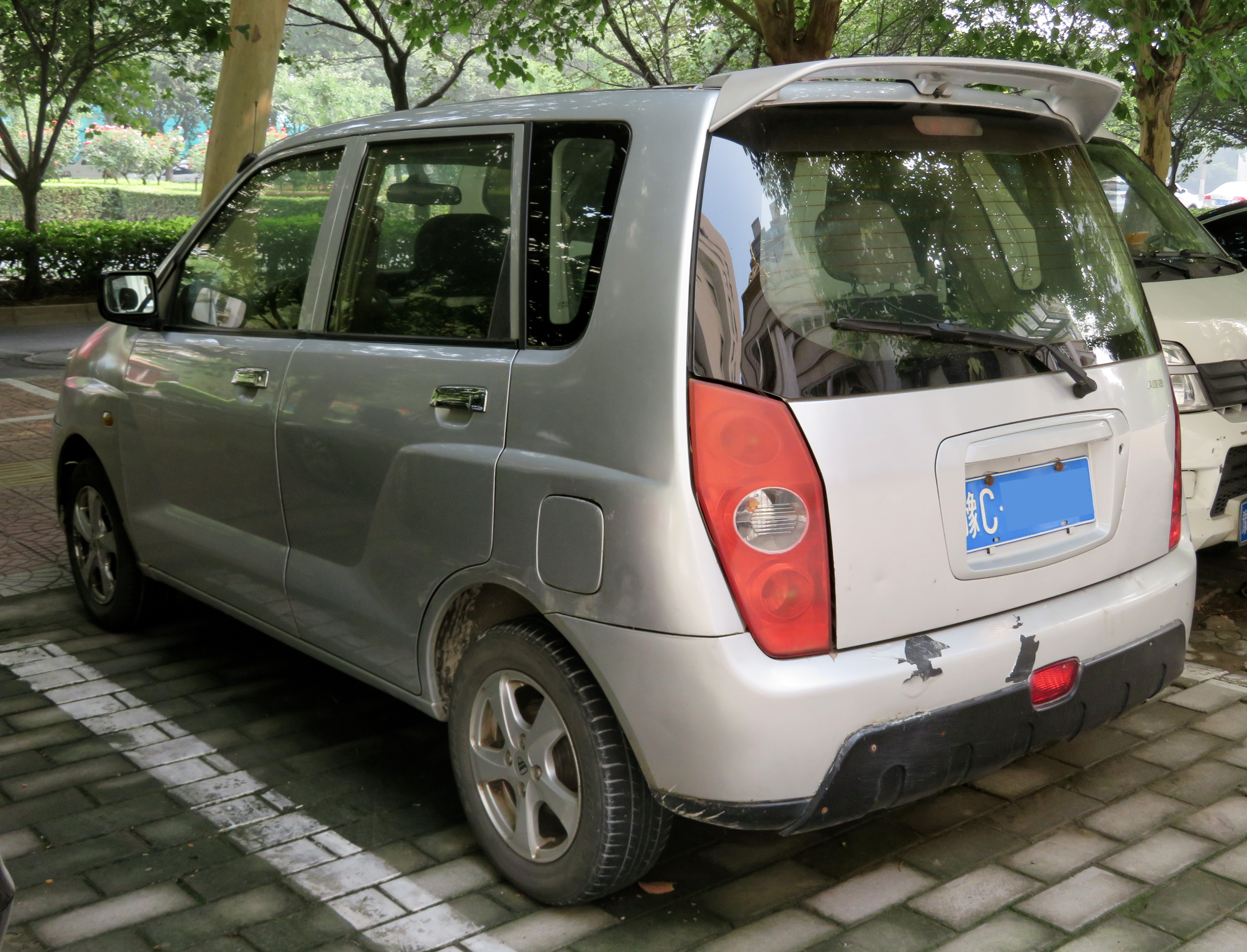
Hafei Saima facelift (China)

== Annual sales ==
Year	Domestic sales	Exports
1998	unknown	
1999	unknown	
2000	16,696	1
2001	15,143	-
2002	4,076	-
2003	24	143
2004	-	127

(Sources: Facts & Figures 2000, Facts & Figures 2005, Mitsubishi Motors website)
