= Foton Midi =

Chinese mini MPV

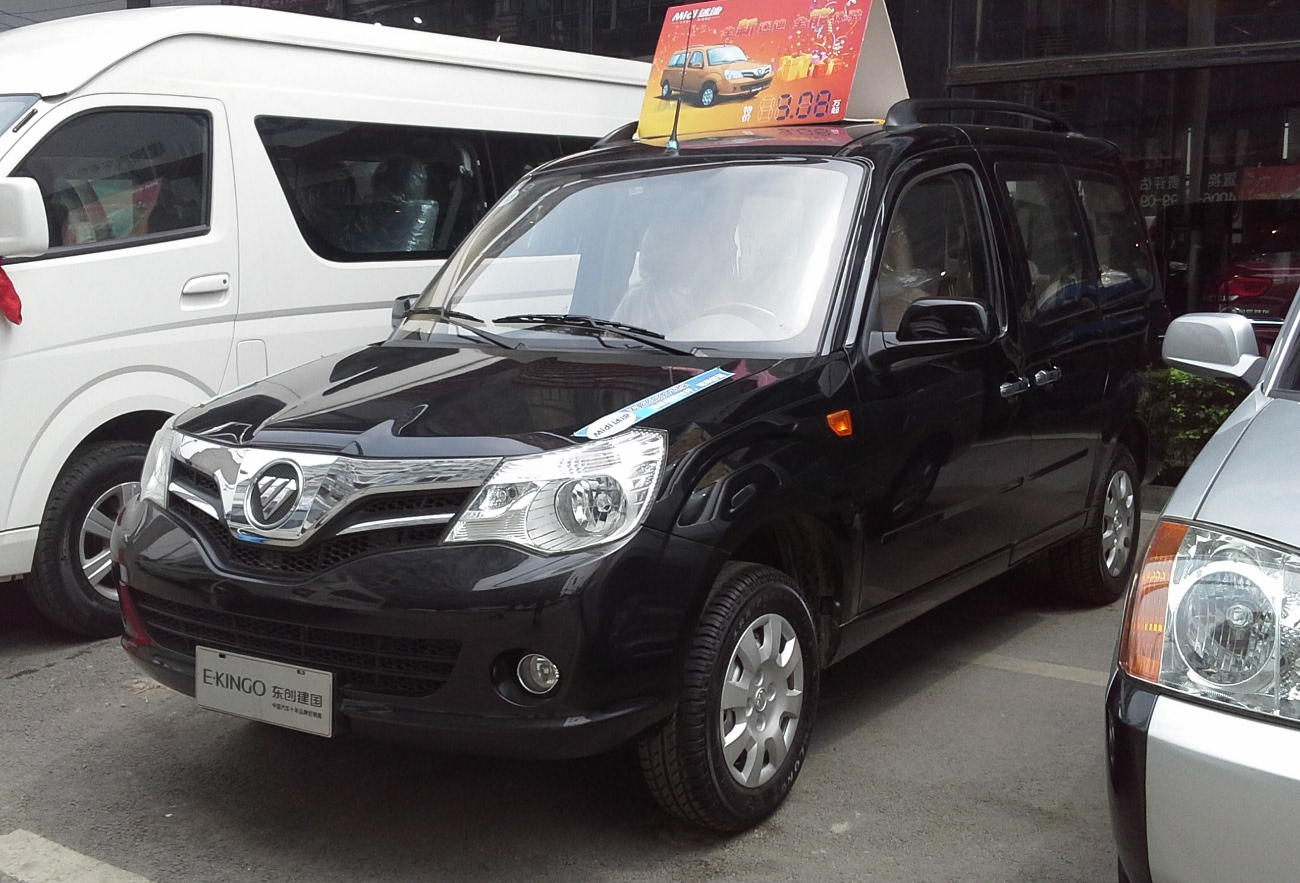

Overview
- Manufacturer: Foton
- Production: 2008-2014
- Model years: 2008–2014

Body and chassis
- Class: MPV
- Body style: 5-door station wagon
- Layout: FF

Powertrain
- Engine: 1.35L I4; 1.5L I4; 1.6L I4
- Transmission: 5-speed manual

Dimensions
- Wheelbase: 2,695 mm (106.1 in)
- Length: 4,338 mm (170.8 in)
- Width: 1,725 mm (67.9 in)
- Height: 1,831 mm (72.1 in)

The Foton Midi (Chinese: 福田迷迪) is a Leisure activity vehicle produced from 2008 to 2014 by Foton, a subsidiary of BAIC Group.

== Overview ==
The original price of the Foton Midi ranged from 59,800 yuan to 66,400 yuan with two four-cylinder petrol engines available including a 1.3 litre engine producing 63 kW (85 hp) and a 1.5 litre engine producing 78 kW (105 hp) with both engines mated to a 5-speed manual gearbox. A facelift featuring a new 1.6 litre engine option and a restyled front fascia was introduced in 2013 for the 2014 model year, but due to poor sales, the Midi was soon discontinued. The price of the Foton Midi before being phased out ranged from 59,300 yuan to 66,700 yuan.

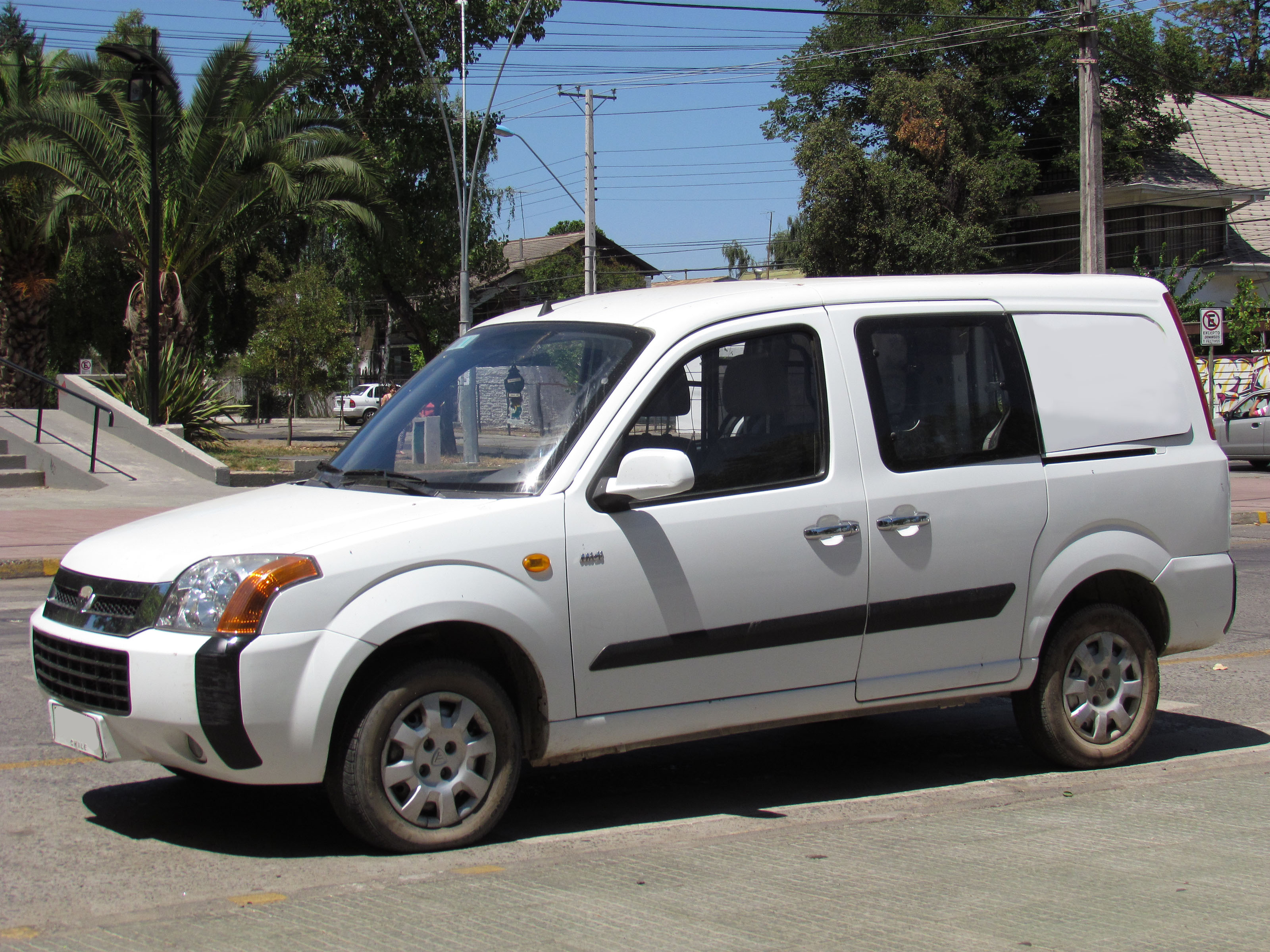
Pre-facelift Foton Midi C1.6 panel van in Chile

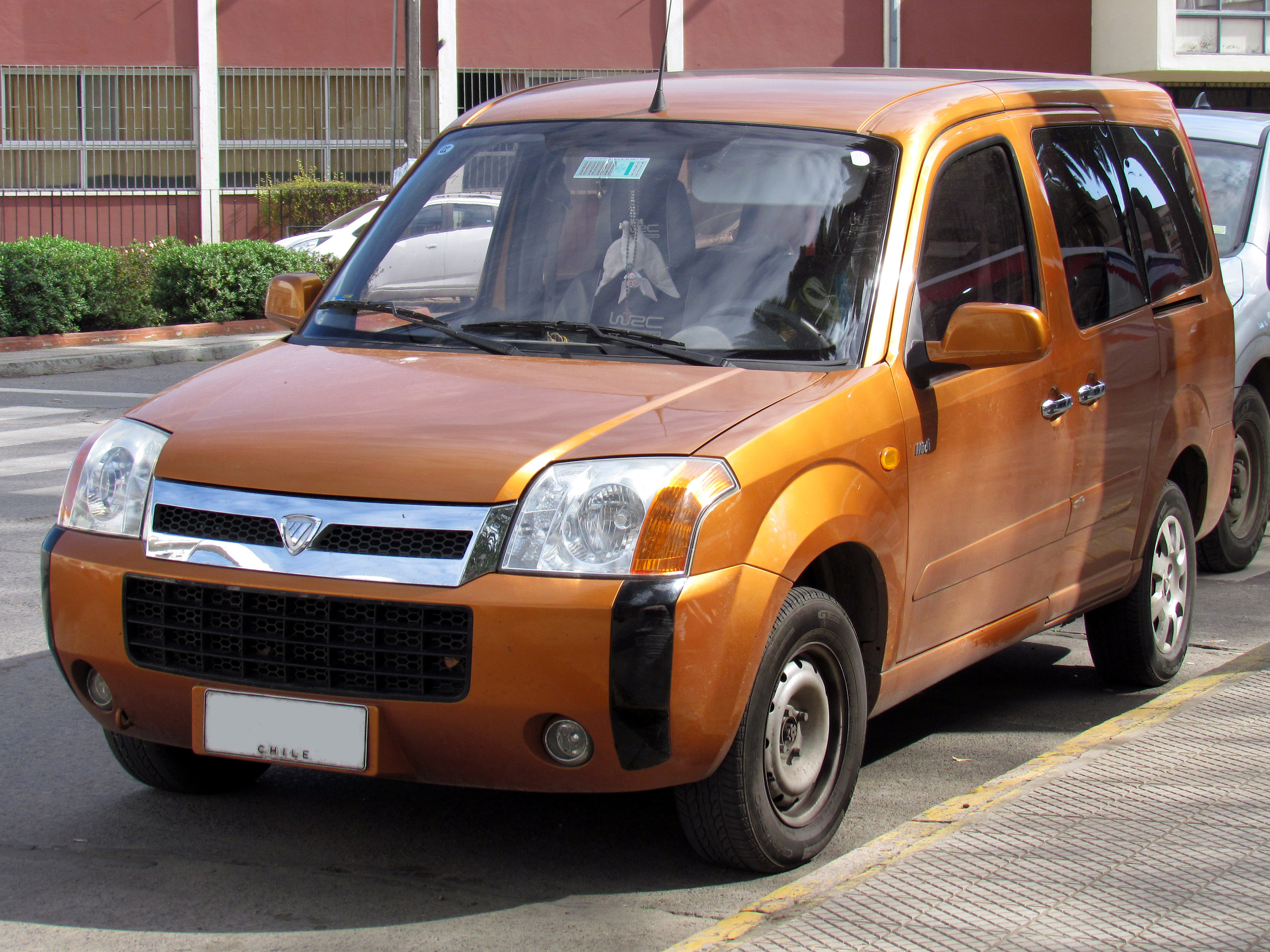
Pre-facelift Foton Midi C1.6 Van in Chile

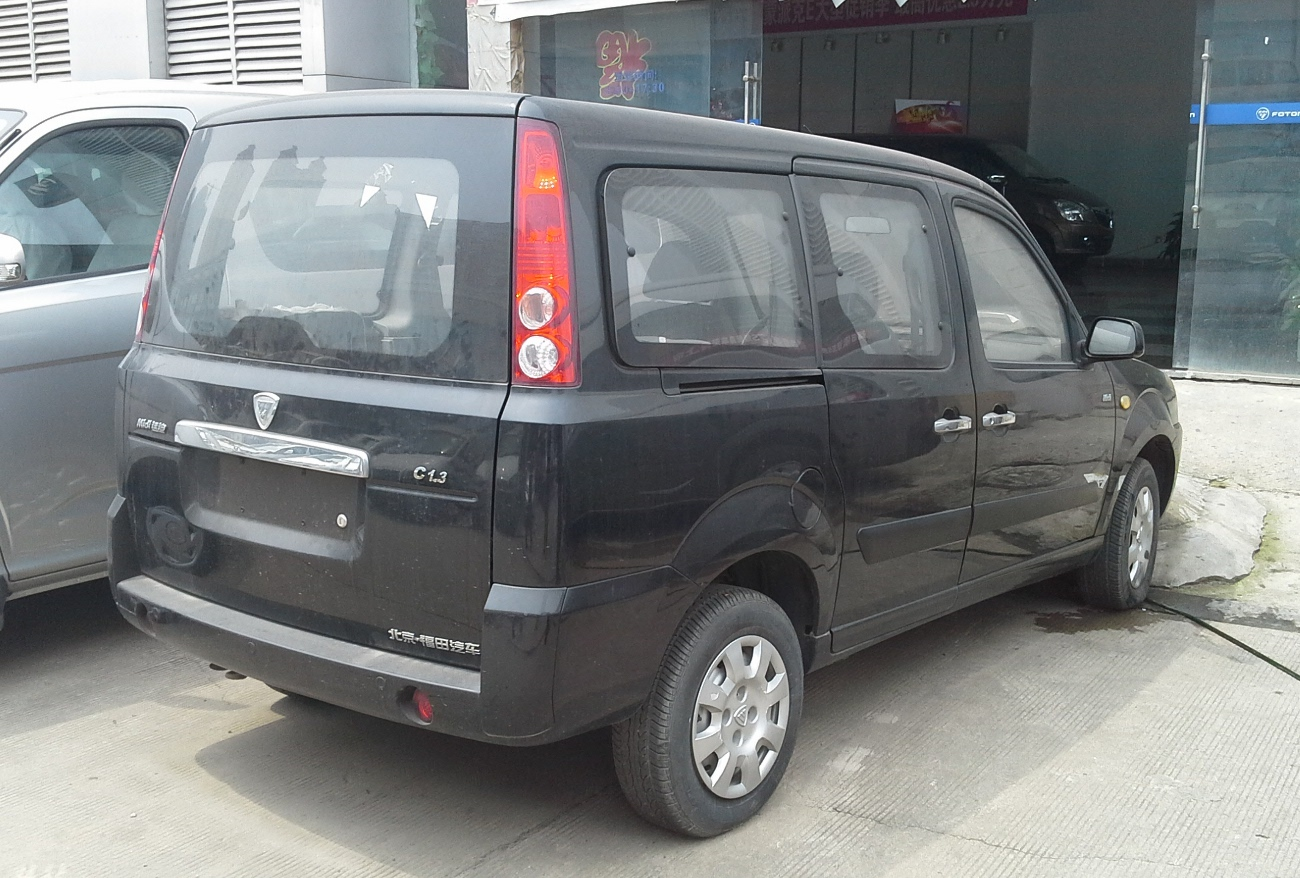
Pre-facelift Foton Midi LWB rear view in China
