= 2002 Exide Batteries 2 Hour Showroom Showdown =

Seasons
- ← 2001 2003 →

Layout of the Mount Panorama Circuit

The 2002 Exide Batteries 2 Hour Showroom Showdown was an endurance race for Australian GT Production Cars. The event was staged at the Mount Panorama Circuit, Bathurst, New South Wales, Australia on Saturday 16 November 2002 as a support event on program for the 2002 Bathurst 24 Hour. Since 1997 the Bathurst Showroom Showdown had been the lead support race for the Bathurst 1000 but moved to the 24 Hour was promoted and run by the same PROCAR organisation.

Entry list was smaller as some teams chose to race in the 24 Hour race so the Mirage Cup was added to the eligibility.

The race was won by Gary Young and Michael Brock driving a Mitsubishi Lancer RS-E Evolution VI won the race by 15 seconds ahead of the similar Mitsubishi Lancer RS-E Evolution VII driven by Graham Alexander and John Woodberry with the Mazda RX-7 Turbo of Bob Pearson and Mark Brame finishing third.

== Class structure ==
Cars competed in the following three classes:

- Class A : GT-Performance class cars
- Class B : GT-Production class cars
- Class C : Mitsubishi Mirage Cup

== Results ==
Pos.	Class	No.	Team / Entrant	Drivers	Car	Laps	Time/Retired
Pos.	Class	No.	Team / Entrant	Drivers	Engine	Laps	Time/Retired
1	A	18	Brock Partners / Coopers	Michael Brock; Gary Young	Mitsubishi Lancer RS-E Evolution VI	47	2:02:38.8391
1	A	18	Brock Partners / Coopers	Michael Brock; Gary Young	2.0 L Mitsubishi Sirius 4G63 turbocharged I4	47	2:02:38.8391
2	A	57	Corio Auto Parts Plus	Graham Alexander; John Woodberry	Mitsubishi Lancer RS-E Evolution VII	47	+15.326
2	A	57	Corio Auto Parts Plus	Graham Alexander; John Woodberry	2.0 L Mitsubishi Sirius 4G63 turbocharged I4	47	+15.326
3	A	33	Pro-Duct Motorsport	Bob Pearson; Mark Brame	Mazda RX-7 Turbo	46	+1 lap
3	A	33	Pro-Duct Motorsport	Bob Pearson; Mark Brame	1.3 L Mazda 13B-REW twin-turbocharged twin-rotor	46	+1 lap
4	A	30	supercard.com.au	Peter Roma; Mark Thomas	Mazda RX-7 Turbo	46	+1 lap
4	A	30	supercard.com.au	Peter Roma; Mark Thomas	1.3 L Mazda 13B-REW twin-turbocharged twin-rotor	46	+1 lap
5	C	66	Maxisteel Bushley	Yanis Derums; Chris Oxley	Mitsubishi Mirage	43	+4 laps
5	C	66	Maxisteel Bushley	Yanis Derums; Chris Oxley	1.6 L Mitsubishi MIVEC 4G92 I4	43	+4 laps
6	C	69	Northshore Mitsubishi	Kean Booker; Rocco Rinaldo	Mitsubishi Mirage	43	+4 laps
6	C	69	Northshore Mitsubishi	Kean Booker; Rocco Rinaldo	1.6 L Mitsubishi MIVEC 4G92 I4	43	+4 laps
7	C	7	Francois Jouy	Francois Jouy; Mark Eddy	Mitsubishi Mirage	43	+4 laps
7	C	7	Francois Jouy	Francois Jouy; Mark Eddy	1.6 L Mitsubishi MIVEC 4G92 I4	43	+4 laps
8	C	27	Martin Bailey Building	Martin Bailey; Dean Evans	Mitsubishi Mirage	43	+4 laps
8	C	27	Martin Bailey Building	Martin Bailey; Dean Evans	1.6 L Mitsubishi MIVEC 4G92 I4	43	+4 laps
9	B	17	Holden / Bilstein / CVG Gas	Martin Doxey; David Mertens	Holden TS Astra SRi	42	+5 laps
9	B	17	Holden / Bilstein / CVG Gas	Martin Doxey; David Mertens	2.2 L Holden Z22SE I4	42	+5 laps
10	E	22	Daihatsu Motor Corporation	Michael Taylor; Rick Bates	Daihatsu Sirion GTVi	41	+6 laps
10	E	22	Daihatsu Motor Corporation	Michael Taylor; Rick Bates	1.3 L Toyota 2SZ-FE I4	41	+6 laps
11	B	21	Graham Roylett	Graham Roylett; Andre Morgan	Proton Satria GTi	40	+7 laps
11	B	21	Graham Roylett	Graham Roylett; Andre Morgan	1.8 L Mitsubishi 4G93 I4	40	+7 laps
12	A	53	Ric Shaw Racing	Ric Shaw; Warwick Rooklyn	Mazda RX-7 Turbo	36	+11 laps
12	A	53	Ric Shaw Racing	Ric Shaw; Warwick Rooklyn	1.3 L Mazda 13B-REW twin-turbocharged twin-rotor	36	+11 laps
DNF	A	38	Castran Gilbert Pty Ltd	Dennis Gilbert; Glen Gilbert	Mitsubishi Lancer RS-E Evolution VI	42	
DNF	A	38	Castran Gilbert Pty Ltd	Dennis Gilbert; Glen Gilbert	2.0 L Mitsubishi Sirius 4G63 turbocharged I4	42	
DNF	A	2	Brett Peters	Rod Dawson; Todd Wanless	Subaru Impreza WRX STi	41	
DNF	A	2	Brett Peters	Rod Dawson; Todd Wanless	2.0 L Subaru EJ turbocharged H4	41	
DNF	B	70	Nilsson Motorsport	Stephen Robinson; Stephen Voight	Honda Integra Type-R	39	
DNF	B	70	Nilsson Motorsport	Stephen Robinson; Stephen Voight	1.8 L Honda B18C I4	39	
DNF	A	63	Austronic Services	Julian Mazzone; Paul Mitolo	Mazda RX-7 Turbo	29	
DNF	A	63	Austronic Services	Julian Mazzone; Paul Mitolo	1.3 L Mazda 13B-REW twin-turbocharged twin-rotor	29	
DNF	B	67	Team Satria Racing	Geoff Russell; Mike Kilpatrick	Proton Satria GTi	23	
DNF	B	67	Team Satria Racing	Geoff Russell; Mike Kilpatrick	1.8 L Mitsubishi 4G93 I4	23	
DNF	A	220	Haysom Motorsport	Tony Alford; John Grounds	Nissan 200SX Spec-R	23	
DNF	A	220	Haysom Motorsport	Tony Alford; John Grounds	2.0 L Nissan SR20DET turbocharged I4	23	
DNF	A	8	Eagle Products	Mark Cohen; Tom Watkinson	HSV VX GTS 300kW	17	
DNF	A	8	Eagle Products	Mark Cohen; Tom Watkinson	5.7 L GM Generation III LS1 V8	17	
DNF	A	87	Tankworld	John Falk; Neil McFadyen	Subaru Impreza WRX STi	14	
DNF	A	87	Tankworld	John Falk; Neil McFadyen	2.0 L Subaru EJ turbocharged H4	14	
EXC	A	96	Advanced Power	Don Pulver; Tony Wilson	Nissan 200SX Spec-R		
EXC	A	96	Advanced Power	Don Pulver; Tony Wilson	2.0 L Nissan SR20DET turbocharged I4		
EXC	C	12	Platetronic	Richard Gartner; Andrew Miedecke	Mitsubishi Mirage		
EXC	C	12	Platetronic	Richard Gartner; Andrew Miedecke	1.6 L Mitsubishi MIVEC 4G92 I4		
EXC	C	24	Grant Park	Grant Park; Graham Ryan	Mitsubishi Mirage		
EXC	C	24	Grant Park	Grant Park; Graham Ryan	1.6 L Mitsubishi MIVEC 4G92 I4		
EXC	C	16	Karecla Patisserie	Kurt Bieder; Mohan Perera	Mitsubishi Mirage		
EXC	C	16	Karecla Patisserie	Kurt Bieder; Mohan Perera	1.6 L Mitsubishi MIVEC 4G92 I4		
EXC	C	20	Eastern Creek International Karting	Troy Hunt; Garry Holt	Mitsubishi Mirage		
EXC	C	20	Eastern Creek International Karting	Troy Hunt; Garry Holt	1.6 L Mitsubishi MIVEC 4G92 I4		
