= 2000 Supercheap Auto GT Production Car 3 Hour Showroom Showdown =

Seasons
- ← 1999 2001 →

Layout of the Mount Panorama Circuit

The 2000 Supercheap Auto GT Production Car 3 Hour Showroom Showdown was an endurance race for GT Production Cars The event was staged at the Mount Panorama Circuit, Bathurst, New South Wales, Australia on Saturday 19 November 2000 as a support event on program for the 2000 FAI 1000.

Some V8 Supercar drivers took part in the race such as John Faulkner, Greg Murphy, Steven Richards and Rick Kelly, despite their V8 Supercar commitments in the Bathurst 1000 race. After finishing third in 1998 and second in 1999, the driver pairing of Ed Aitken and John Faulkner won the race, driving a HSV GTS instead of the Porsche 911 RS Clubsport of the previous two races.

== Class structure ==
Class structure was substantially different than for the 1999 race. The previous Class A for Supercars of up to $300,000 purchase price were no longer eligible. These cars had moved from the Showroom Showdown's parent category; the Australian GT Production Car Championship to the Australian Nations Cup Championship. The former Class B was the new Class A. The former Class S was the new Class B. Class C, D and E were changed from being split into three classes via engine capacity to engine configuration. Class D was most affected. The Class D Holdens and Hondas were moved to Class E while the Class D Mazdas now had to race against to bulk of the former Class C Fords, Holdens, Mitsubishis and Toyotas who were all more powerful and faster. Class C was now a battle for SS Commodores and XR8 Falcons. Cars competed in the following five classes:

- Class A : High Performance Cars
- Class B : Sports Touring Cars
- Class C : V8 Touring Cars
- Class D : Six Cylinder Touring Cars
- Class E : Four Cylinder Touring Cars

== Results ==
| Pos. | Class | No. | Team / Entrant | Drivers | Car | Laps | Time/Retired |
| Pos. | Class | No. | Team / Entrant | Drivers | Engine | Laps | Time/Retired |
|---|---|---|---|---|---|---|---|
| 1 | A | 8 | Ed Aitken | Ed Aitken; John Faulkner | HSV VT II GTS 300 | 53 | 3:00:23.8574 |
| 1 | A | 8 | Ed Aitken | Ed Aitken; John Faulkner | 5.7 L GM Generation III LS1 V8 | 53 | 3:00:23.8574 |
| 2 | A | 19 | Sharyn Wood | Ross Almond; Scott Anderson | Mitsubishi Lancer RS-E Evolution V | 53 | +7.340 |
| 2 | A | 19 | Sharyn Wood | Ross Almond; Scott Anderson | 2.0 L Mitsubishi Sirius 4G63 turbocharged I4 | 53 | +7.340 |
| 3 | A | 71 | MAZ Motor Wreckers | Phil Kirkham; Ric Shaw | Mazda RX-7 Turbo | 53 | +10.921 |
| 3 | A | 71 | MAZ Motor Wreckers | Phil Kirkham; Ric Shaw | 1.3 L Mazda 13B-REW twin-turbocharged twin-rotor | 53 | +10.921 |
| 4 | A | 6 | Nepean EFI | Mark Brame; Chris Koursparis | Nissan 200SX Spec-R | 53 | +19.875 |
| 4 | A | 6 | Nepean EFI | Mark Brame; Chris Koursparis | 2.0 L Nissan SR20DET turbocharged I4 | 53 | +19.875 |
| 5 | A | 23 | Barry Morcom | Barry Morcom; Mark Stinson | Mazda RX-7 Turbo | 53 | +26.489 |
| 5 | A | 23 | Barry Morcom | Barry Morcom; Mark Stinson | 1.3 L Mazda 13B-REW twin-turbocharged twin-rotor | 53 | +26.489 |
| 6 | A | 34 | Mark King | Mark King; Rod Wilson | Mitsubishi Lancer RS-E Evolution V | 53 | +27.596 |
| 6 | A | 34 | Mark King | Mark King; Rod Wilson | 2.0 L Mitsubishi Sirius 4G63 turbocharged I4 | 53 | +27.596 |
| 7 | A | 51 | Scott Jacob | Scott Jacob; Grant Kenny | Subaru Impreza WRX STi | 53 | +31.941 |
| 7 | A | 51 | Scott Jacob | Scott Jacob; Grant Kenny | 2.0 L Subaru EJ turbocharged H4 | 53 | +31.941 |
| 8 | A | 14 | Scott's Transport | Peter Gazzard; Clyde Lawrence | Subaru Impreza WRX STi | 53 | +53.612 |
| 8 | A | 14 | Scott's Transport | Peter Gazzard; Clyde Lawrence | 2.0 L Subaru EJ turbocharged H4 | 53 | +53.612 |
| 9 | A | 96 | Don Pulver | Don Pulver; Terry Shiel | Nissan 200SX Spec-R | 53 | +1:00.262 |
| 9 | A | 96 | Don Pulver | Don Pulver; Terry Shiel | 2.0 L Nissan SR20DET turbocharged I4 | 53 | +1:00.262 |
| 10 | C | 22 | James Philip | James Philip; Kent Youlden | Ford AU Falcon XR8 | 53 | +1:00.659 |
| 10 | C | 22 | James Philip | James Philip; Kent Youlden | 5.0 L Ford Windsor V8 | 53 | +1:00.659 |
| 11 | C | 95 | John McIlroy | John McIlroy; Brett Youlden | Ford AU Falcon XR8 | 53 | +1:00.827 |
| 11 | C | 95 | John McIlroy | John McIlroy; Brett Youlden | 5.0 L Ford Windsor V8 | 53 | +1:00.827 |
| 12 | A | 4 | Anton Mechtler | Kevin Bell; Anton Mechtler | Subaru Impreza WRX STi | 53 | +1:00.880 |
| 12 | A | 4 | Anton Mechtler | Kevin Bell; Anton Mechtler | 2.0 L Subaru EJ turbocharged H4 | 53 | +1:00.880 |
| 13 | A | 28 | Ross Palmer Motorsport | Greg Crick; Darren Palmer | Honda S2000 | 53 | +1:05.378 |
| 13 | A | 28 | Ross Palmer Motorsport | Greg Crick; Darren Palmer | 2.0 L Honda F20C I4 | 53 | +1:05.378 |
| 14 | C | 62 | Scott Loadsman | Scott Loadsman; Allan Marin | Holden VT Commodore SS | 53 | +1:06.419 |
| 14 | C | 62 | Scott Loadsman | Scott Loadsman; Allan Marin | 5.0 L Holden 5000i V8 | 53 | +1:06.419 |
| 15 | D | 70 | Daryl Coon | John Bowe; Daryl Coon | Ford AU Falcon XR6 | 52 | +1 lap |
| 15 | D | 70 | Daryl Coon | John Bowe; Daryl Coon | 4.0 L Ford Intech HP I6 | 52 | +1 lap |
| 16 | B | 2 | John Cowley | John Cowley; Wayne Park | Honda Integra Type-R | 52 | +1 lap |
| 16 | B | 2 | John Cowley | John Cowley; Wayne Park | 1.8 L Honda B18C I4 | 52 | +1 lap |
| 17 | B | 45 | Toyota Motor Corp. | Neal Bates; Peter McKay | Toyota Celica VVTL-I | 52 | +1 lap |
| 17 | B | 45 | Toyota Motor Corp. | Neal Bates; Peter McKay | 1.8 L Toyota 2ZZ-GE I4 | 52 | +1 lap |
| 18 | B | 16 | Peter Phelan | Peter Phelan; David Wood | Honda Integra Type-R | 52 | +1 lap |
| 18 | B | 16 | Peter Phelan | Peter Phelan; David Wood | 1.8 L Honda B18C I4 | 52 | +1 lap |
| 19 | C | 24 | Richard Winston | Denis Cribbin; Roland Hill; Richard Winston | Holden VT Commodore SS | 52 | +1 lap |
| 19 | C | 24 | Richard Winston | Denis Cribbin; Roland Hill; Richard Winston | 5.0 L Holden 5000i V8 | 52 | +1 lap |
| 20 | A | 57 | Graham Alexander | Graham Alexander; John Woodberry | Mitsubishi Lancer RS-E Evolution V | 52 | +1 lap |
| 20 | A | 57 | Graham Alexander | Graham Alexander; John Woodberry | 2.0 L Mitsubishi Sirius 4G63 turbocharged I4 | 52 | +1 lap |
| 21 | C | 18 | Warren Millett | Stephen Mantle; Warren Millett | Holden VT Commodore SS | 51 | +2 laps |
| 21 | C | 18 | Warren Millett | Stephen Mantle; Warren Millett | 5.0 L Holden 5000i V8 | 51 | +2 laps |
| 22 | A | 87 | Peter Floyd | Peter Floyd; Dean Lillie | Mazda RX-7 Turbo | 51 | +2 laps |
| 22 | A | 87 | Peter Floyd | Peter Floyd; Dean Lillie | 1.3 L Mazda 13B-REW twin-turbocharged twin-rotor | 51 | +2 laps |
| 23 | D | 20 | Robert Chadwick | Robert Chadwick; Steve Knight | Mitsubishi TH Magna Sports | 51 | +2 laps |
| 23 | D | 20 | Robert Chadwick | Robert Chadwick; Steve Knight | 3.5 L Mitsubishi Cyclone 6G74 V6 | 51 | +2 laps |
| 24 | D | 93 | Jim Myhill | Jim Myhill; Trent Ulmer | Mitsubishi TH Magna Sports | 51 | +2 laps |
| 24 | D | 93 | Jim Myhill | Jim Myhill; Trent Ulmer | 3.5 L Mitsubishi Cyclone 6G74 V6 | 51 | +2 laps |
| 25 | B | 44 | Coads Pty Ltd | Steven Coad; Greg McPherson | Honda Integra Type-R | 51 | +2 laps |
| 25 | B | 44 | Coads Pty Ltd | Steven Coad; Greg McPherson | 1.8 L Honda B18C I4 | 51 | +2 laps |
| 26 | D | 43 | Calvin Gardiner | Calvin Gardiner; Tom Watkinson | Mazda 626 | 51 | +2 laps |
| 26 | D | 43 | Calvin Gardiner | Calvin Gardiner; Tom Watkinson | 2.5 L Mazda KL-DE V6 | 51 | +2 laps |
| 27 | E | 17 | Gibson Motorsport | Greg Murphy; Steven Richards | Holden Astra GSi | 51 | +2 laps |
| 27 | E | 17 | Gibson Motorsport | Greg Murphy; Steven Richards | 2.0 L Holden Family II C20XE I4 | 51 | +2 laps |
| 28 | A | 25 | Richard Davis | Ian Agnew; Richard Davis | HSV VS GTS-R 215i | 51 | +2 laps |
| 28 | A | 25 | Richard Davis | Ian Agnew; Richard Davis | 5.7 L HSV 215i V8 | 51 | +2 laps |
| 29 | B | 66 | Ian McAllister | Kevin Burton; Ian McAllister | Honda Integra Type-R | 51 | +2 laps |
| 29 | B | 66 | Ian McAllister | Kevin Burton; Ian McAllister | 1.8 L Honda B18C I4 | 51 | +2 laps |
| 30 | E | 36 | Northshore Rallysport | Dean Evans; Warren Luff | Peugeot 306 Style | 51 | +2 laps |
| 30 | E | 36 | Northshore Rallysport | Dean Evans; Warren Luff | 1.8 L Peugeot XU7 I4 | 51 | +2 laps |
| 31 | D | 88 | Nepean EFI | David Ratcliff; Ron Searle | Toyota Camry CSi | 50 | +3 laps |
| 31 | D | 88 | Nepean EFI | David Ratcliff; Ron Searle | 3.0 L Toyota 1MZ-FE V6 | 50 | +3 laps |
| 32 | B | 7 | Peter Boylan | Peter Boylan; Melinda Price | Honda Integra Type-R | 50 | +3 laps |
| 32 | B | 7 | Peter Boylan | Peter Boylan; Melinda Price | 1.8 L Honda B18C I4 | 50 | +3 laps |
| 33 | E | 37 | Nathan Thomas | Bill Harris; Nathan Thomas | Suzuki Swift GTi | 50 | +3 laps |
| 33 | E | 37 | Nathan Thomas | Bill Harris; Nathan Thomas | 1.3 L Suzuki G13B I4 | 50 | +3 laps |
| 34 | A | 61 | Anton Mechtler | Kevin Bell; Anton Mechtler | Subaru Impreza WRX STi | 50 | +3 laps |
| 34 | A | 61 | Anton Mechtler | Kevin Bell; Anton Mechtler | 2.0 L Subaru EJ turbocharged H4 | 50 | +3 laps |
| 35 | E | 29 | Gibson Motorsport | Leanne Ferrier; Rick Kelly | Holden Astra GSi | 50 | +3 laps |
| 35 | E | 29 | Gibson Motorsport | Leanne Ferrier; Rick Kelly | 2.0 L Holden Family II C20XE I4 | 50 | +3 laps |
| 36 | E | 49 | David Crowe | David Crowe; Gavin Fazakerley | Suzuki Swift GTi | 50 | +3 laps |
| 36 | E | 49 | David Crowe | David Crowe; Gavin Fazakerley | 1.3 L Suzuki G13B I4 | 50 | +3 laps |
| 37 | E | 50 | Buy-A-Drive | Andrew Bretherton; Aaron McGill | Suzuki Swift GTi | 50 | +3 laps |
| 37 | E | 50 | Buy-A-Drive | Andrew Bretherton; Aaron McGill | 1.3 L Suzuki G13B I4 | 50 | +3 laps |
| 38 | C | 64 | Brian Carr | Brian Carr; Bruce Constable | Ford AU Falcon XR8 | 50 | +3 laps |
| 38 | C | 64 | Brian Carr | Brian Carr; Bruce Constable | 5.0 L Ford Windsor V8 | 50 | +3 laps |
| 39 | E | 21 | Kosi Kalaitzidis | Michael Brock; Kosi Kalaitzidis | Proton Satria GTi | 49 | +4 laps |
| 39 | E | 21 | Kosi Kalaitzidis | Michael Brock; Kosi Kalaitzidis | 1.8 L Mitsubishi 4G93 I4 | 49 | +4 laps |
| 40 | E | 65 | Darren Best | Darren Best; Steve Cramp | Hyundai Excel Sprint | 49 | +4 laps |
| 40 | E | 65 | Darren Best | Darren Best; Steve Cramp | 1.5 L Hyundai G4EK I4 | 49 | +4 laps |
| 41 | B | 13 | Osborne Motorsport | Colin Osborne; Peter Rushton | Toyota MR2 Bathurst | 48 | +5 laps |
| 41 | B | 13 | Osborne Motorsport | Colin Osborne; Peter Rushton | 2.0 L Toyota 3S-GE I4 | 48 | +5 laps |
| 42 | D | 75 | V.W. Parts Service | Greg Haysom; Gary Young | Ford EL Falcon XR6 | 40 | +13 laps |
| 42 | D | 75 | V.W. Parts Service | Greg Haysom; Gary Young | 4.0 L Ford Thriftpower Six I6 | 40 | +13 laps |
| DNF | A | 39 | Bob Pearson | Allan McCarthy; Bob Pearson | Mazda RX-7 Turbo | 43 | |
| DNF | A | 39 | Bob Pearson | Allan McCarthy; Bob Pearson | 1.3 L Mazda 13B-REW twin-turbocharged twin-rotor | 43 | |
| DNF | E | 67 | John Dickinson | David Russell; Nigel Williams | Proton Satria GTi | 32 | |
| DNF | E | 67 | John Dickinson | David Russell; Nigel Williams | 1.8 L Mitsubishi 4G93 I4 | 32 | |
| DNF | B | 31 | Osborne Motorsport | Vern Norrgard; John Roecken | Toyota MR2 Bathurst | 27 | |
| DNF | B | 31 | Osborne Motorsport | Vern Norrgard; John Roecken | 2.0 L Toyota 3S-GE I4 | 27 | |
| DNF | A | 40 | Ben Kerrigan | Dwayne Bewley; Ben Kerrigan | Subaru Impreza WRX | 25 | |
| DNF | A | 40 | Ben Kerrigan | Dwayne Bewley; Ben Kerrigan | 2.0 L Subaru EJ turbocharged H4 | 25 | |
| DNF | C | 32 | Guy Gibbons | Guy Gibbons; Barry Tanton | Ford AU Falcon XR8 | 21 | |
| DNF | C | 32 | Guy Gibbons | Guy Gibbons; Barry Tanton | 5.0 L Ford Windsor V8 | 21 | |
| DNF | B | 26 | Challenge Recruitment | Danny Brian; Sue Hughes | BMW 323i | 19 | |
| DNF | B | 26 | Challenge Recruitment | Danny Brian; Sue Hughes | 2.5 L BMW M52 I6 | 19 | |
| DNF | A | 97 | Ross Dillon | Ross Dillon; Anthony Scott | HSV VT II GTS 300 | 6 | |
| DNF | A | 97 | Ross Dillon | Ross Dillon; Anthony Scott | 5.7 L GM Generation III LS1 V8 | 6 | |
| DNF | A | 80 | Greg Waters | Geoff Emery; Greg Waters | Mazda RX-7 Turbo | 4 | |
| DNF | A | 80 | Greg Waters | Geoff Emery; Greg Waters | 1.3 L Mazda 13B-REW twin-turbocharged twin-rotor | 4 | |
| DNF | A | 91 | Jim McKnoulty | Gary Deane; Jim McKnoulty | Subaru Impreza WRX | 0 | |
| DNF | A | 91 | Jim McKnoulty | Gary Deane; Jim McKnoulty | 2.0 L Subaru EJ turbocharged H4 | 0 | |
| DSQ | A | 15 | Robert Hughes | Rick Bates; Robert Hughes | Mitsubishi Lancer RS-E Evolution V | | |
| DSQ | A | 15 | Robert Hughes | Rick Bates; Robert Hughes | 2.0 L Mitsubishi Sirius 4G63 turbocharged I4 | | |
| DSQ | A | 38 | Dennis Gilbert | Dennis Gilbert; Hart Mason; Trevor McGuinness | Mitsubishi Lancer RS-E Evolution V | | |
| DSQ | A | 38 | Dennis Gilbert | Dennis Gilbert; Hart Mason; Trevor McGuinness | 2.0 L Mitsubishi Sirius 4G63 turbocharged I4 | | |
| DSQ | A | 35 | Ric Shaw | John Falk; Ken Lusty | Subaru Impreza WRX | | |
| DSQ | A | 35 | Ric Shaw | John Falk; Ken Lusty | 2.0 L Subaru EJ turbocharged H4 | | |
| DSQ | C | 85 | Craig Dontas | Craig Dontas; Tim Pearce | Holden VT Commodore SS | | |
| DSQ | C | 85 | Craig Dontas | Craig Dontas; Tim Pearce | 5.0 L Holden 5000i V8 | | |
| DNQ | A | 60 | NSW WRX Club | Wayne Boatright; Steve Burke | Subaru Impreza WRX | | |
| DNQ | A | 60 | NSW WRX Club | Wayne Boatright; Steve Burke | 2.0 L Subaru EJ turbocharged H4 | | |
| DNQ | B | 27 | Challenge Recruitment | Len Cave; Alan Shepheard | BMW 323i | | |
| DNQ | B | 27 | Challenge Recruitment | Len Cave; Alan Shepheard | 2.5 L BMW M52 I6 | | |
| DNQ | D | 46 | On Track Motorsport | Garry Mennell; Tony Newman | Ford EL Falcon XR6 | | |
| DNQ | D | 46 | On Track Motorsport | Garry Mennell; Tony Newman | 4.0 L Ford Thriftpower Six I6 | | |
| DNQ | E | 74 | V.W Parts Service | Paul Buda; Bradley Searle | Suzuki Swift GTi | | |
| DNQ | E | 74 | V.W Parts Service | Paul Buda; Bradley Searle | 1.3 L Suzuki G13B I4 | | |
