= 2003 2 Hour Showroom Showdown =

2003 2 Hour Showroom Showdown Race

Seasons
- ← 2002 none →

Layout of the Mount Panorama Circuit

The 2003 2 Hour Showroom Showdown Race was an endurance race for Australian GT Production Cars. The event was staged at the Mount Panorama Circuit, Bathurst, New South Wales, Australia on Saturday 22 November 2003 as a support event on the program for the 2003 Bathurst 24 Hour. This was the seventh and final Showroom Showdown production car endurance race.

Rod Salmon and Grant Park, driving a Subaru Impreza WRX STi won the race by 27 seconds ahead of the Mazda RX-7 driven by Bob Pearson with the Ford Falcon-based Tickford TE50 of John Falk finishing third.

== Class structure ==
Cars competed in the following three classes:

- Class A : GT-Performance class cars
- Class B : Mitsubishi Mirage Cup
- Class C : GT-Production class cars

== Results ==
| Pos. | Class | No. | Team / Entrant | Drivers | Car | Laps | Time/Retired |
| Pos. | Class | No. | Team / Entrant | Drivers | Engine | Laps | Time/Retired |
|---|---|---|---|---|---|---|---|
| 1 | A | 60 | Falken Tyres | Rod Salmon; Grant Park | Subaru Impreza WRX STi | 36 | 2:02:00.4090 |
| 1 | A | 60 | Falken Tyres | Rod Salmon; Grant Park | 2.0 L Subaru EJ20 turbocharged H4 | 36 | 2:02:00.4090 |
| 2 | A | 33 | Pro-Duct Motorsport | Bob Pearson | Mazda RX-7 Turbo | 36 | +27.421 |
| 2 | A | 33 | Pro-Duct Motorsport | Bob Pearson | 1.3 L Mazda 13B-REW twin-turbocharged twin-rotor | 36 | +27.421 |
| 3 | A | 87 | FPR Pools / Tankworld | John Falk | FTE TE50 | 36 | +1:02.038 |
| 3 | A | 87 | FPR Pools / Tankworld | John Falk | 5.0 L Ford Synergy 5000 V8 | 36 | +1:02.038 |
| 4 | A | 300 | Floyd Motorsport | Peter Floyd | HSV VX GTS 300kW | 36 | +1:14.425 |
| 4 | A | 300 | Floyd Motorsport | Peter Floyd | 5.7 L GM Generation III LS1 V8 | 36 | +1:14.425 |
| 5 | C | 30 | GAM Electric / Softronic Systems | David Ryan; Michael Craig | Ford BA Falcon XR6T | 36 | +2:03.105 |
| 5 | C | 30 | GAM Electric / Softronic Systems | David Ryan; Michael Craig | 4.0 L Ford Barra 240T turbocharged I6 | 36 | +2:03.105 |
| 6 | A | 23 | Mitsubishi Electric | Steve Knight; Charlie Kovacs | Mitsubishi Lancer RS-E Evolution VI | 36 | +2:06.078 |
| 6 | A | 23 | Mitsubishi Electric | Steve Knight; Charlie Kovacs | 2.0 L Mitsubishi Sirius 4G63 turbocharged I4 | 36 | +2:06.078 |
| 7 | A | 35 | Ric Shaw Racing | James Parish; Ric Shaw | Mazda RX-7 Turbo | 36 | +2:20.581 |
| 7 | A | 35 | Ric Shaw Racing | James Parish; Ric Shaw | 1.3 L Mazda 13B-REW twin-turbocharged twin-rotor | 36 | +2:20.581 |
| 8 | A | 91 | The PMM Group | Jim McKnoulty; Dean Wanless | Subaru Impreza WRX STi | 36 | +2:23.150 |
| 8 | A | 91 | The PMM Group | Jim McKnoulty; Dean Wanless | 2.0 L Subaru EJ20 turbocharged H4 | 36 | +2:23.150 |
| 9 | A | 11 | Rondo Building Supplies | Graham Alexander; Barry Morcom | HSV VX GTS 300kW | 35 | +1 lap |
| 9 | A | 11 | Rondo Building Supplies | Graham Alexander; Barry Morcom | 5.7 L GM Generation III LS1 V8 | 35 | +1 lap |
| 10 | C | 62 | Solace / Wakeling | Scott Loadsman; Ian Luff | Holden VX Commodore SS | 35 | +1 lap |
| 10 | C | 62 | Solace / Wakeling | Scott Loadsman; Ian Luff | 5.7 L GM Generation III LS1 V8 | 35 | +1 lap |
| 11 | A | 15 | Bob Hughes Special Vehicles | Bob Hughes | Mitsubishi Lancer RS-E Evolution VI | 35 | +1 lap |
| 11 | A | 15 | Bob Hughes Special Vehicles | Bob Hughes | 2.0 L Mitsubishi Sirius 4G63 turbocharged I4 | 35 | +1 lap |
| 12 | C | 27 | Go Karts Go | Chris Alajajian | BMW E36 323i | 35 | +1 lap |
| 12 | C | 27 | Go Karts Go | Chris Alajajian | 2.5 L BMW M52B25 I6 | 35 | +1 lap |
| 13 | C | 32 | Circle Corporation | David Capraro; John Milan | Alfa Romeo 156 GTA | 35 | +1 lap |
| 13 | C | 32 | Circle Corporation | David Capraro; John Milan | 3.2 L Alfa Romeo 3.2 24V V6 | 35 | +1 lap |
| 14 | B | 69 | Northshore Mitsubishi | Kean Booker; Rocco Rinaldo | Mitsubishi Mirage | 34 | +2 laps |
| 14 | B | 69 | Northshore Mitsubishi | Kean Booker; Rocco Rinaldo | 1.6 L Mitsubishi MIVEC 4G92 I4 | 34 | +2 laps |
| 15 | C | 7 | Hankook Tyres / DBA | Peter Conroy; Terry Conroy | Honda Integra Type-R | 34 | +2 laps |
| 15 | C | 7 | Hankook Tyres / DBA | Peter Conroy; Terry Conroy | 1.8 L Honda B18C I4 | 34 | +2 laps |
| 16 | B | 40 | Supercar Experience | Ash Samadi | Mitsubishi Mirage | 34 | +2 laps |
| 16 | B | 40 | Supercar Experience | Ash Samadi | 1.6 L Mitsubishi MIVEC 4G92 I4 | 34 | +2 laps |
| 17 | B | 41 | grog2go.com.au | Brendon Cook | Mitsubishi Mirage | 34 | +2 laps |
| 17 | B | 41 | grog2go.com.au | Brendon Cook | 1.6 L Mitsubishi MIVEC 4G92 I4 | 34 | +2 laps |
| 18 | B | 66 | Maxisteel | Yanis Derums | Mitsubishi Mirage | 34 | +2 laps |
| 18 | B | 66 | Maxisteel | Yanis Derums | 1.6 L Mitsubishi MIVEC 4G92 I4 | 34 | +2 laps |
| 19 | C | 68 | Proton Cars Australia | Nicolas Lucas; Tengku Mahaleel | Proton Satria GTi | 33 | +3 laps |
| 19 | C | 68 | Proton Cars Australia | Nicolas Lucas; Tengku Mahaleel | 1.8 L Mitsubishi 4G93 I4 | 33 | +3 laps |
| 20 | C | 24 | Wizard Financial | David Borg; Sam Astuti | Mitsubishi Mirage | 33 | +3 laps |
| 20 | C | 24 | Wizard Financial | David Borg; Sam Astuti | 1.6 L Mitsubishi MIVEC 4G92 I4 | 33 | +3 laps |
| 21 | C | 67 | Proton Cars Australia | Geoff Russell; David Russell | Proton Satria GTi | 33 | +3 laps |
| 21 | C | 67 | Proton Cars Australia | Geoff Russell; David Russell | 1.8 L Mitsubishi 4G93 I4 | 33 | +3 laps |
| 22 | B | 3 | Dentbuster-Equity-One | Francois Jouy; Richard Luff | Mitsubishi Mirage | 33 | +3 laps |
| 22 | B | 3 | Dentbuster-Equity-One | Francois Jouy; Richard Luff | 1.6 L Mitsubishi MIVEC 4G92 I4 | 33 | +3 laps |
| 23 | B | 16 | Karecla Patisserie | Kurt Bieder | Mitsubishi Mirage | 30 | +6 laps |
| 23 | B | 16 | Karecla Patisserie | Kurt Bieder | 1.6 L Mitsubishi MIVEC 4G92 I4 | 30 | +6 laps |
| DNF | A | 9 | Mek-Tek Motorsport | Anton Mechtler | Mitsubishi Lancer RS-E Evolution VII | 19 | |
| DNF | A | 9 | Mek-Tek Motorsport | Anton Mechtler | 2.0 L Mitsubishi Sirius 4G63 turbocharged I4 | 19 | |
| DNF | A | 63 | Novatec Construction Systems | Paul Mitolo; Dale Brede | Mazda RX-7 Turbo | 14 | |
| DNF | A | 63 | Novatec Construction Systems | Paul Mitolo; Dale Brede | 1.3 L Mazda 13B-REW twin-turbocharged twin-rotor | 14 | |
| DNF | C | 22 | Daihatsu Motor Corporation | Leanne Ferrier; Rick Bates | Daihatsu Sirion GTVi | 10 | |
| DNF | C | 22 | Daihatsu Motor Corporation | Leanne Ferrier; Rick Bates | 1.3 L Toyota 2SZ-FE I4 | 10 | |
| DNF | A | 96 | Advanced Power | Don Pulver; Tony Wilson | Nissan 200SX GT | 9 | |
| DNF | A | 96 | Advanced Power | Don Pulver; Tony Wilson | 2.0 L Nissan SR20DET turbocharged I4 | 9 | |
| DNF | B | 4 | Platetronic | Richard Gartner; Enzo Piazza | Mitsubishi Mirage | 3 | |
| DNF | B | 4 | Platetronic | Richard Gartner; Enzo Piazza | 1.6 L Mitsubishi MIVEC 4G92 I4 | 3 | |
| DNF | A | 70 | Altiris | Michael Sainsbury; Wayne Boatright | Subaru Impreza WRX STi | 2 | |
| DNF | A | 70 | Altiris | Michael Sainsbury; Wayne Boatright | 2.0 L Subaru EJ20 turbocharged H4 | 2 | |
| DNF | A | 43 | Hydralyte | Lee Clinnick; C. Coles | Subaru Impreza WRX STi | | |
| DNF | A | 43 | Hydralyte | Lee Clinnick; C. Coles | 2.0 L Subaru EJ20 turbocharged H4 | | |
| DNS | A | 38 | Castran Gilbert | Dennis Gilbert; Glen Gilbert | HSV VX GTS 300kW | | |
| DNS | A | 38 | Castran Gilbert | Dennis Gilbert; Glen Gilbert | 5.7 L GM Generation III LS1 V8 | | |
