= 2001 VIP Petfoods GT Production Showroom Showdown =

Seasons
- ← 2000 2002 →

Layout of the Mount Panorama Circuit

The 2001 VIP Petfoods GT Production Showroom Showdown was an endurance race for Australian GT Production Cars. The event was staged at the Mount Panorama Circuit, Bathurst, New South Wales, Australia on Saturday 6 October 2001 as a support event on program for the 2001 V8 Supercar 1000. After four years of the race occurring as a three-hour time limited race, the race was shortened to two hours duration.

The race was won by Graham Alexander and John Woodberry driving a Mitsubishi Lancer RS-E Evolution V won the race by 16 seconds ahead of the Ford Mustang SVT Cobra RA driven by John Bowe and Chris Dunn.

== Class structure ==
Cars competed in the following five classes:

- Class A : High Performance Cars - Under $150,000
- Class B : Sports Touring Cars - Under $80,000
- Class C : V8 Production Cars - Under $50,000
- Class D : Six Cylinder Production Touring Cars
- Class E : Four Cylinder Production Touring Cars

== Results ==
Pos.	Class	No.	Team / Entrant	Drivers	Car	Laps	Time/Retired
Pos.	Class	No.	Team / Entrant	Drivers	Engine	Laps	Time/Retired
1	A	57	Corio Auto Parts Plus	Graham Alexander; John Woodberry	Mitsubishi Lancer RS-E Evolution V	41	2:00:42.4544
1	A	57	Corio Auto Parts Plus	Graham Alexander; John Woodberry	2.0 L Mitsubishi Sirius 4G63 turbocharged I4	41	2:00:42.4544
2	A	9	Budweiser	John Bowe; Chris Dunn	Ford Mustang SVT Cobra RA	41	+16.807
2	A	9	Budweiser	John Bowe; Chris Dunn	5.4 L Ford Modular V8	41	+16.807
3	A	300	Floyd Motorsport	Peter Floyd; Cameron McConville	HSV VX GTS	41	+1:34.960
3	A	300	Floyd Motorsport	Peter Floyd; Cameron McConville	5.7 L GM Generation III LS1 V8	41	+1:34.960
4	A	91	Jim McKnoulty	Gary Deane; Rob Rubis	Subaru Impreza WRX STi	41	+1:49.550
4	A	91	Jim McKnoulty	Gary Deane; Rob Rubis	2.0 L Subaru EJ turbocharged H4	41	+1:49.550
5	A	1	King Springs/Delphi	Mark King; Rod Wilson	Mitsubishi Lancer RS-E Evolution V	41	+2:41.894
5	A	1	King Springs/Delphi	Mark King; Rod Wilson	2.0 L Mitsubishi Sirius 4G63 turbocharged I4	41	+2:41.894
6	A	47	Schepisi Comms./Crystal IT	Neil Cunningham; Phillip Polites	HSV VX GTS	40	+1 lap
6	A	47	Schepisi Comms./Crystal IT	Neil Cunningham; Phillip Polites	5.7 L GM Generation III LS1 V8	40	+1 lap
7	A	15	Bob Hughes Special Vehicles	Bob Hughes; Tony Quinn	Mitsubishi Lancer RS-E Evolution VI	40	+1 lap
7	A	15	Bob Hughes Special Vehicles	Bob Hughes; Tony Quinn	2.0 L Mitsubishi Sirius 4G63 turbocharged I4	40	+1 lap
8	A	11	Barry Morcom Racing	Brian Callaghan Jr; Barry Morcom	HSV VX GTS	40	+1 lap
8	A	11	Barry Morcom Racing	Brian Callaghan Jr; Barry Morcom	5.7 L GM Generation III LS1 V8	40	+1 lap
9	A	14	Scott's Transport Industries	Peter Gazzard; Clyde Lawrence	Subaru Impreza WRX STi	40	+1 lap
9	A	14	Scott's Transport Industries	Peter Gazzard; Clyde Lawrence	2.0 L Subaru EJ turbocharged H4	40	+1 lap
10	A	38	Dennis Gilbert	Dennis Gilbert; Trevor McGuinness	Mitsubishi Lancer RS-E Evolution V	40	+1 lap
10	A	38	Dennis Gilbert	Dennis Gilbert; Trevor McGuinness	2.0 L Mitsubishi Sirius 4G63 turbocharged I4	40	+1 lap
11	A	31	Komatsu Racing	Shane Jenner; Charlie O'Brien	Nissan 200SX Spec-R	40	+1 lap
11	A	31	Komatsu Racing	Shane Jenner; Charlie O'Brien	2.0 L Nissan SR20DET turbocharged I4	40	+1 lap
12	A	28	Ross Palmer Motorsport	Darren Palmer; Ross Palmer	Honda S2000	40	+1 lap
12	A	28	Ross Palmer Motorsport	Darren Palmer; Ross Palmer	2.0 L Honda F20C I4	40	+1 lap
13	A	90	Anton Mechtler	Graham Moore; Anton Mechtler	Mitsubishi Lancer RS-E Evolution V	40	+1 lap
13	A	90	Anton Mechtler	Graham Moore; Anton Mechtler	2.0 L Mitsubishi Sirius 4G63 turbocharged I4	40	+1 lap
14	A	51	Falken Tyres	Scott Jacob; Grant Kenny	Subaru Impreza WRX STi	40	+1 lap
14	A	51	Falken Tyres	Scott Jacob; Grant Kenny	2.0 L Subaru EJ turbocharged H4	40	+1 lap
15	C	62	C + L Tiles	Scott Loadsman; Ian Luff	Holden VX Commodore SS	40	+1 lap
15	C	62	C + L Tiles	Scott Loadsman; Ian Luff	5.7 L GM Generation III LS1 V8	40	+1 lap
16	A	63	Haysom Motorsport	Greg Haysom; Drew Kruck	Nissan 200SX Spec-R	40	+1 lap
16	A	63	Haysom Motorsport	Greg Haysom; Drew Kruck	2.0 L Nissan SR20DET turbocharged I4	40	+1 lap
17	C	69	Coffey Ford/PartsPlus/Tickford	James Philip; Kent Youlden	Ford AU Falcon XR8	40	+1 lap
17	C	69	Coffey Ford/PartsPlus/Tickford	James Philip; Kent Youlden	5.0 L Ford Windsor V8	40	+1 lap
18	B	27	Novacastrian Motorsport	Steve Cramp; Wayne Russell	BMW 323i	40	+1 lap
18	B	27	Novacastrian Motorsport	Steve Cramp; Wayne Russell	2.5 L BMW M52 I6	40	+1 lap
19	B	35	Volkswagen	Matt Coleman; Tim Leahey	Volkswagen Beetle RSi	40	+1 lap
19	B	35	Volkswagen	Matt Coleman; Tim Leahey	1.8 L Volkswagen R4 20vT turbocharged I4	40	+1 lap
20	B	77	Auto One	Phil Parsons; Nathan Pilkington	Mitsubishi FTO	39	+2 laps
20	B	77	Auto One	Phil Parsons; Nathan Pilkington	2.0 L Mitsubishi 6A12 V6	39	+2 laps
21	B	66	Blue Ribbon Honda - Ipswich	Len Cave; Guy Gibbons	Honda Integra Type-R	39	+2 laps
21	B	66	Blue Ribbon Honda - Ipswich	Len Cave; Guy Gibbons	1.8 L Honda B18C I4	39	+2 laps
22	D	20	Mitsubishi Electric Australia	Robert Chadwick; Warren Luff	Mitsubishi TJ Magna Sports	39	+2 laps
22	D	20	Mitsubishi Electric Australia	Robert Chadwick; Warren Luff	3.5 L Mitsubishi Cyclone 6G74 V6	39	+2 laps
23	C	64	Brian Carr	Brian Carr; John McIlroy	Ford AU Falcon XR8	39	+2 laps
23	C	64	Brian Carr	Brian Carr; John McIlroy	5.0 L Ford Windsor V8	39	+2 laps
24	B	32	Quirks/Stahlwille	Sue Hughes; David Lawson	BMW 323i	39	+2 laps
24	B	32	Quirks/Stahlwille	Sue Hughes; David Lawson	2.5 L BMW M52 I6	39	+2 laps
25	B	44	Thrifty Car Rental	Donald Pedder; Allan Shephard	Honda Integra Type-R	38	+3 laps
25	B	44	Thrifty Car Rental	Donald Pedder; Allan Shephard	1.8 L Honda B18C I4	38	+3 laps
26	E	68	Caltex Havoline Racing	David Russell; Nathan Thomas	Proton Satria GTi	38	+3 laps
26	E	68	Caltex Havoline Racing	David Russell; Nathan Thomas	1.8 L Mitsubishi 4G93 I4	38	+3 laps
27	E	17	Bilstein / Quadrant	Marshall Brewer; Martin Doxey	Holden Vectra GL	38	+3 laps
27	E	17	Bilstein / Quadrant	Marshall Brewer; Martin Doxey	2.2 L Holden Family II C22SEL I4	38	+3 laps
28	B	49	Osborne Motorsport	Darren Best; Andrew Bretherton	Toyota Celica VVTL-I	38	+3 laps
28	B	49	Osborne Motorsport	Darren Best; Andrew Bretherton	1.8 L Toyota 2ZZ-GE I4	38	+3 laps
29	D	79	Alan Holgersson	Alan Holgersson; Daniel Sugden	Toyota Camry CSi	38	+3 laps
29	D	79	Alan Holgersson	Alan Holgersson; Daniel Sugden	3.0 L Toyota 1MZ-FE V6	38	+3 laps
30	E	22	Daihatsu Motor Sport	Rick Bates; Geoff Forshaw	Daihatsu Sirion GTVi	38	+3 laps
30	E	22	Daihatsu Motor Sport	Rick Bates; Geoff Forshaw	1.3 L Toyota 2SZ-FE I4	38	+3 laps
31	E	97	Bendix/Patterson Cheney	Ben Driscoll; Kimon Papagoarge	Holden Vectra GL	37	+4 laps
31	E	97	Bendix/Patterson Cheney	Ben Driscoll; Kimon Papagoarge	2.2 L Holden Family II C22SEL I4	37	+4 laps
32	A	7	Quirks Refrigeration	Peter Boylan; Trevor Sheumack	BMW M3	37	+4 laps
32	A	7	Quirks Refrigeration	Peter Boylan; Trevor Sheumack	3.2 L BMW S54 I6	37	+4 laps
33	B	39	Osborne Motorsport	Denis Cribbin; Roland Hill	Toyota MR2 Bathurst	37	+4 laps
33	B	39	Osborne Motorsport	Denis Cribbin; Roland Hill	2.0 L Toyota 3S-GE I4	37	+4 laps
34	A	88	Brock Partners Real Estate	Michael Brock; Gary Young	Mitsubishi Lancer RS-E Evolution V	36	+5 laps
34	A	88	Brock Partners Real Estate	Michael Brock; Gary Young	2.0 L Mitsubishi Sirius 4G63 turbocharged I4	36	+5 laps
35	B	13	Osborne Motorsport	Colin Osborne; John Roecken	Toyota Celica VVTL-I	35	+6 laps
35	B	13	Osborne Motorsport	Colin Osborne; John Roecken	1.8 L Toyota 2ZZ-GE I4	35	+6 laps
36	A	61	Team Yamaha	Steve Burke; Trevor Haines	Subaru Impreza WRX STi	31	+10 laps
36	A	61	Team Yamaha	Steve Burke; Trevor Haines	2.0 L Subaru EJ turbocharged H4	31	+10 laps
DNF	A	25	Adelaide Caravan Park	Richard Davis; Allan Walls	HSV VX GTS	37	
DNF	A	25	Adelaide Caravan Park	Richard Davis; Allan Walls	5.7 L GM Generation III LS1 V8	37	
DNF	D	70	AMAS Security	Daryl Coon; Warren Millett	Ford AU Falcon XR6	33	
DNF	D	70	AMAS Security	Daryl Coon; Warren Millett	4.0 L Ford Intech HP I6	33	
DNF	A	23	Steve Knight	Ross Almond; Steve Knight	Mitsubishi Lancer RS-E Evolution VI	31	
DNF	A	23	Steve Knight	Ross Almond; Steve Knight	2.0 L Mitsubishi Sirius 4G63 turbocharged I4	31	
DNF	E	67	Clarion Car Audio	Domenic Beninca; Nigel Williams	Proton Satria GTi	27	
DNF	E	67	Clarion Car Audio	Domenic Beninca; Nigel Williams	1.8 L Mitsubishi 4G93 I4	27	
DNF	A	26	Brett Peters	Brett Peters; Scott Shearman	Subaru Impreza WRX STi	22	
DNF	A	26	Brett Peters	Brett Peters; Scott Shearman	2.0 L Subaru EJ turbocharged H4	22	
DNF	E	21	Kosi Kalaitzidis	Richard Hing; Chris Poulton	Proton Satria GTi	21	
DNF	E	21	Kosi Kalaitzidis	Richard Hing; Chris Poulton	1.8 L Mitsubishi 4G93 I4	21	
DNF	A	8	My Accessory	Ed Aitken; John Faulkner	HSV VX GTS	19	
DNF	A	8	My Accessory	Ed Aitken; John Faulkner	5.7 L GM Generation III LS1 V8	19	
DNF	B	53	Volkswagen	Will Davison; Stuart McColl	Volkswagen Beetle RSi	11	
DNF	B	53	Volkswagen	Will Davison; Stuart McColl	1.8 L Volkswagen R4 20vT turbocharged I4	11	
DNF	A	87	Falk Motorsport	John Falk; Ken Lusty	Subaru Impreza WRX	10	
DNF	A	87	Falk Motorsport	John Falk; Ken Lusty	2.0 L Subaru EJ turbocharged H4	10	
DNS	A	99	Budweiser	Scott Shearman; John Teulan	Ford Mustang SVT Cobra RA		
DNS	A	99	Budweiser	Scott Shearman; John Teulan	5.4 L Ford Modular V8		
DNS	A	59	Altiris Software	Scott Anderson; Wayne Boatright	Subaru Impreza WRX	10	
DNS	A	59	Altiris Software	Scott Anderson; Wayne Boatright	2.0 L Subaru EJ turbocharged H4	10	
