= Rick Bates =

Australian rally driver

- Nationality: Australian
- Born: Richard Glen Bates; 19 March 1965 (age 61) Canberra, Australian Capital Territory
- Relatives: Neal Bates (twin brother); Zach Bates (son); Harry Bates (nephew)

World Rally Championship record
- Years active: 1997, 1999
- Teams: Daihatsu Australia
- Rallies: 2
- Championships: 0
- Rally wins: 0
- Podiums: 0
- Stage wins: 0
- Total points: 0
- First rally: 1997 Rally Australia
- Last rally: 1999 China Rally

Richard Glen Bates (born 19 March 1965) is an Australian rally driver. He is the twin brother of the rally and racing driver, Neal Bates. Whilst Neal has achieved more success in the Australian Rally Championship, winning it four times, Rick has won two major cross country events in a nine-year span. The first was Panama-Alaska in 1997 and the next win was the Carrera Sudamericana in 2006.

Bates has, on at least one occasion, competed directly against his twin brother.

== Career ==
In 1997, Bates won the Panama to Alaska rally driving a Porsche 911 with his co-driver Jenny Brittan. He has also appeared in two events of the World Rally Championship. First, he drove to 30th place at Rally Australia 1997 in a Daihatsu Charade GTi. Then, he drove at China Rally 1999, this time in a Volkswagen Jetta GTX, but he retired on the fifth special stage.

In both occasions, Bates was co-driven by Jenny Brittan with whom he won the Panama to Alaska rally in 1997. The former event saw him race with his twin brother Neal who scored points with an eighth-place finish.

In 1997, Bates won the Australian Formula 2 Rally Championship driving a Daihatsu Charade GTi.

In 2000, Bates was third in the London-Sydney Marathon, finishing behind Stig Blomqvist and Michele Mouton.

In 2006, Bates and Brittan also won the Carrera Sudamericana in Argentina.

== Rally results ==
| Season | Series | Position | Car | Team |
|---|---|---|---|---|
| 1995 | Australian Formula 2 Rally Championship | 1st | Daihatsu Charade GTi | Daihatsu Motor Corp |
| 1996 | Bulldog Midland Rally | 36th | Porsche 911 | Rick Bates/Jenny Brittan |
| 1997 | Panama - Alaska Rally | 1st | Porsche 911 | Rick Bates/Jenny Brittan |
| 1998 | Shield of Africa Rally | 11th | Porsche 911 | Rick Bates/Jenny Brittan |
| 2000 | London-Sydney Marathon | 3rd | Porsche 911 | Rick Bates/Jenny Brittan |
| 2006 | Carrera Sudamericana Rally | 1st | Honda Integra Type-R | Rick Bates/Jenny Brittan |
| 2006 | Australian Rally Championship | 23rd | Ford Focus | Team Pirtek |

=== WRC results ===
| Year | Entrant | Car | 1 | 2 | 3 | 4 | 5 | 6 | 7 | 8 | 9 | 10 | 11 | 12 | 13 | 14 | WDC | Points |
|---|---|---|---|---|---|---|---|---|---|---|---|---|---|---|---|---|---|---|
| 1997 | Daihatsu Australia | Daihatsu Charade GTi | MON | SWE | KEN | POR | ESP | FRA | ARG | GRE | NZL | FIN | IDN | ITA | AUS; 30 | GBR | NC | 0 |
| 1999 | Volkswagen FRD Rally Team | Volkswagen Jetta GTX | MON | SWE | KEN | POR | ESP | FRA | ARG | GRE | NZL | FIN | CHN; Ret | ITA | AUS | GBR | NC | 0 |

== Circuit results ==
Rick Bates
- Nationality: (Australia) Australian

Supercars Championship career
- Championships: 0
- Races: 20
- Wins: 0
- Podiums: 0
- Pole positions: 0

| Season | Series | Position | Car | Team |
|---|---|---|---|---|
| 2000 | Shell Supercars Championship Series | 39th | Ford AU Falcon | Colorscan Motorsport |
| 2001 | Australian GT Production Car Championship - Class E | 5th | Daihatsu Sirion GTVi | Daihatsu Motor Corp |
| 2001 | Shell Supercars Championship Series | 42nd | Holden VX Commodore | Lansvale Racing Team |
| 2002 | Australian GT Production Car Championship | 8th | Daihatsu Sirion GTVi | Daihatsu Motor Corp |
| 2002 | Australian GT Production Car Championship - Class E | **3rd** | Daihatsu Sirion GTVi | Daihatsu Motor Corp |
| 2002 | V8 Supercars Championship | 54th | Holden VX Commodore | John Faulkner Racing |
| 2003 | Australian Production Car Championship | 11th | Daihatsu Sirion GTVi | Daihatsu Motor Corp |
| 2003 | Australian Production Car Championship - Class D | 5th | Daihatsu Sirion GTVi | Daihatsu Motor Corp |
| 2003 | V8 Supercars Championship | 65th | Ford AU Falcon | ICS Team Ford |
| 2004 | Australian Production Car Championship | 10th | Daihatsu Sirion GTVi | Daihatsu Motor Corp |
| 2004 | Australian Production Car Championship - Class D | **3rd** | Daihatsu Sirion GTVi | Daihatsu Motor Corp |
| 2005 | Australian Production Car Championship | 21st | Toyota Corolla Sportivo | Novocastrian Motorsport |
| 2010 | Australian Production Car Championship | 31st | Mazda 3 MPS | Osborne Motorsport |
| 2012 | Australian Production Car Championship - Class C | 15th | Mazda 3 MPS | Osborne Motorsport |
| 2014 | Australian Production Car Championship - Class C | 11th | Mazda 3 MPS | Osborne Motorsport |
| 2015 | Australian Production Car Championship | 4th | Mitsubishi Lancer RS Evolution X | Pro-Duct Motorsport |
| 2016 | Australian Production Car Championship | 8th | Renault Megane RS275; Mitsubishi Lancer RS Evolution X | Osborne Motorsport; Pro-Duct Motorsport |
| 2017 | Australian Production Car Championship | 6th | Mitsubishi Lancer RS Evolution X | Pro-Duct Motorsport |
| 2018 | Australian Production Car Championship | 8th | Mitsubishi Lancer RS Evolution X | Pro-Duct Motorsport |

=== Supercars Championship results ===
(Races in bold indicate pole position) (Races in italics indicate fastest lap)

Supercars results
| Year | Team | Car | 1 | 2 | 3 | 4 | 5 | 6 | 7 | 8 | 9 | 10 | 11 | 12 | 13 | 14 | 15 | 16 | 17 | 18 | 19 | 20 | 21 | 22 | 23 | 24 | 25 | 26 | 27 | 28 | 29 | 30 | 31 | 32 | 33 | Position | Points |
|---|---|---|---|---|---|---|---|---|---|---|---|---|---|---|---|---|---|---|---|---|---|---|---|---|---|---|---|---|---|---|---|---|---|---|---|---|---|
| 2000 | Colorscan Motorsport | Ford AU Falcon | PHI; R1 | PHI; R2 | BAR; R3 | BAR; R4 | BAR; R5 | ADE; R6 | ADE; R7 | EAS; R8 | EAS; R9 | EAS; R10 | HDV; R11 | HDV; R12 | HDV; R13 | CAN; R14 | CAN; R15 | CAN; R16 | QLD; R17 | QLD; R18 | QLD; R19 | WIN; R20; 24 | WIN; R21; 22 | WIN; R22; 24 | ORA; R23; 27 | ORA; R24; 23 | ORA; R25; Ret | CAL; R26; 30 | CAL; R27; 23 | CAL; R28; 26 | QLD; R29; 18 | SAN; R30; 21 | SAN; R31; 15 | SAN; R32; 18 | BAT; R33; 15 | 39th | 100 |
| 2001 | Lansvale Racing Team | Holden VX Commodore | PHI; R1 | PHI; R2 | ADE; R3 | ADE; R4 | EAS; R5 | EAS; R6 | HDV; R7 | HDV; R8 | HDV; R9 | CAN; R10 | CAN; R11 | CAN; R12 | BAR; R13 | BAR; R14 | BAR; R15 | CAL; R16 | CAL; R17 | CAL; R18 | ORA; R19 | ORA; R20 | QLD; R21; 19 | WIN; R22 | WIN; R23 | BAT; R24; 10 | PUK; R25 | PUK; R26 | PUK; R27 | SAN; R28 | SAN; R29 | SAN; R30 | | | | 42nd | 388 |
| 2002 | John Faulkner Racing | Holden VX Commodore | ADE; R1 | ADE; R2 | PHI; R3 | PHI; R4 | EAS; R5 | EAS; R6 | EAS; R7 | HDV; R8 | HDV; R9 | HDV; R10 | CAN; R11 | CAN; R12 | CAN; R13 | BAR; R14 | BAR; R15 | BAR; R16 | ORA; R17 | ORA; R18 | WIN; R19 | WIN; R20 | QLD; R21; Ret | BAT; R22; 10 | SUR; R23 | SUR; R24 | PUK; R25 | PUK; R26 | PUK; R27 | SAN; R28 | SAN; R29 | | | | | 54th | 56 |
| 2003 | ICS Team Ford | Ford AU Falcon | ADE; R1 | ADE; R1 | PHI; R3 | EAS; R4 | WIN; R5 | BAR; R6 | BAR; R7 | BAR; R8 | HDV; R9 | HDV; R10 | HDV; R11 | QLD; R12 | ORA; R13 | SAN; R14; 25 | BAT; R15; Ret | SUR; R16 | SUR; R17 | PUK; R18 | PUK; R19 | PUK; R20 | EAS; R21 | EAS; R22 | | | | | | | | | | | | 65th | 100 |

=== Complete Bathurst 1000 results ===
| Year | Car# | Team | Co-drivers | Car | Class | Laps | Pos. | Class pos. |
|---|---|---|---|---|---|---|---|---|
| 1990 | 3 | Search for a Champion | (Australia) Peter Gazzard | Holden VL Commodore SS Group A SV | 1 | 57 | DNF | DNF |
| 1991 | 70 | Toyota Team Australia | (Australia) Neal Bates | Toyota Corolla FX-GT | 3 | 76 | DNF | DNF |
| 1992 | 70 | Toyota Team Australia | (Australia) Neal Bates | Toyota Corolla FX-GT | B | 125 | 24th | **3rd** |
| 2000 | 22 | Colourscan Racing | (Australia) Brett Peters | Ford AU Falcon | – | 157 | 15th | 15th |
| 2001 | 3 | Lansvale Racing Team | (Australia) Cameron McConville | Holden VX Commodore | – | 160 | 10th | 10th |
| 2002 | 46 | John Faulkner Racing | (Australia) John Faulkner | Holden VX Commodore | – | 160 | 10th | 10th |
| 2003 | 23 | ICS Team Ford | (Australia) Neal Bates | Ford AU Falcon | – | 62 | DNF | DNF |

=== Complete Sandown endurance results ===
| Year | Team | Co-drivers | Car | Class | Laps | Pos. | Class pos. |
|---|---|---|---|---|---|---|---|
| 2001 | Bob Hughes Special Vehicles | (Australia) Bob Hughes | Mitsubishi Lancer RS-E Evo VI | A | 150 | 6th | **1st** |
| 2003 | ICS Team Ford | (Australia) Neal Bates | Ford AU Falcon | – | 136 | 25th | 25th |

=== Complete Bathurst/Eastern Creek 12 Hour results ===
| Year | Team | Co-drivers | Car | Class | Laps | Pos. | Class pos. |
|---|---|---|---|---|---|---|---|
| 1991 | (Australia) Neal Bates Motorsport | (Australia) Neal Bates (Australia) Geoff Morgan | Toyota Celica | B | 214 | 17th | **1st** |
| 1992 | (Australia) John Smith | (Australia) Geoff Morgan (Australia) Keith Carling | Toyota MR2 | S | 243 | 7th | **1st** |
| 1993 | (Australia) Neal Bates Motorsport | (Argentina) Juan Manuel Fangio II (Australia) Peter McKay | Toyota MR2 | S | 245 | 6th | **1st** |
| 1994 | (Australia) Neal Bates Motorsport | (Argentina) Juan Manuel Fangio II (Australia) Neal Bates | Toyota MR2 | S | 249 | 4th | **1st** |
| 1995 | (Australia) Neal Bates Motorsport | (Australia) Phil Alexander (Australia) Warren Rush | Toyota MR2 | S | 235 | DNF | DNF |
| 2007 | (Australia) Scott's Transport | (Australia) Peter Gazzard (Australia) Bob Hughes | Mitsubishi Lancer RS Evolution VIII | S | 253 | **3rd** | **2nd** |
| 2010 | (Australia) Osborne Motorsport | (Australia) Colin Osborne | Mazda 3 MPS | C | 15 | DNF | DNF |

=== Complete Bathurst 6 Hour results ===
| Year | Team | Co-drivers | Car | Class | Laps | Pos. | Class pos. |
|---|---|---|---|---|---|---|---|
| 2021 | (Australia) Osborne Motorsport | (Australia) Colin Osborne | Renault Mégane RS265 | C | 0 | DNS | DNS |
| 2022 | (Australia) Osborne Motorsport | (Australia) Colin Osborne | Renault Mégane RS265 | C | 110 | 40th | 5th |
| 2024 | (Australia) Osborne Motorsport | (Australia) Colin Osborne (Australia) Zach Bates | Renault Mégane RS265 | C | 0 | DNS | DNS |

=== Complete Bathurst Showroom Showdown results ===
| Year | Team | Co-drivers | Car | Class | Laps | Pos. | Class pos. |
|---|---|---|---|---|---|---|---|
| 1999 | (Australia) Bob Hughes | (Australia) Bob Hughes | Mazda RX-7 Turbo | B | 53 | 31st | **3rd** |
| 2000 | (Australia) Bob Hughes | (Australia) Bob Hughes | Mitsubishi Lancer RS-E Evolution V | A | - | DSQ | |
| 2001 | (Australia) Daihatsu Motor Corporation | (Australia) Geoff Forshaw | Daihatsu Sirion GTVi | E | 38 | 30th | **3rd** |
| 2002 | (Australia) Daihatsu Motor Corporation | (Australia) Michael Taylor | Daihatsu Sirion GTVi | E | 41 | 10th | **1st** |
| 2003 | (Australia) Daihatsu Motor Corporation | (Australia) Leanne Ferrier | Daihatsu Sirion GTVi | E | 10 | DNF | |
