= Mitsubishi Carisma =

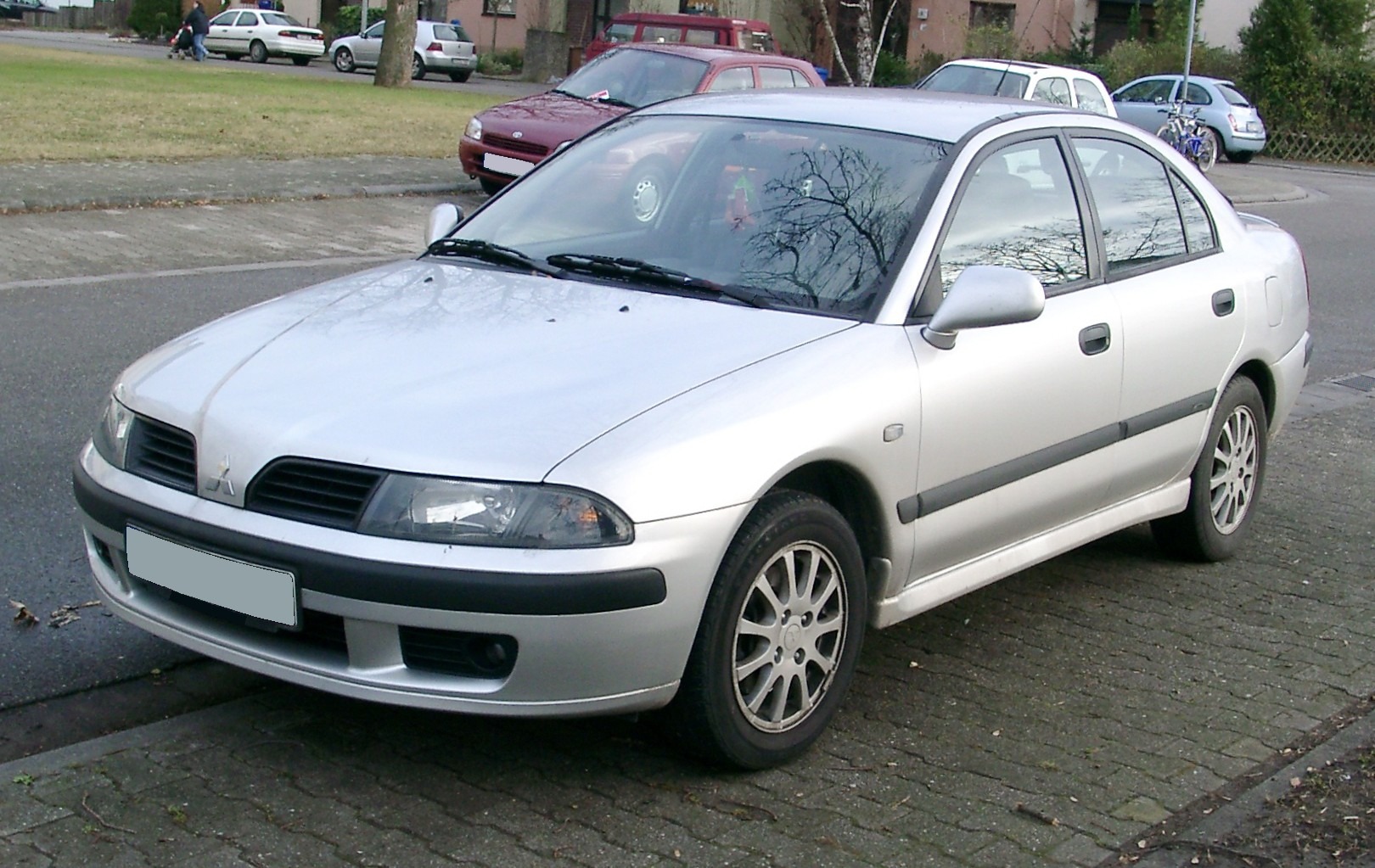
- Mitsubishi Carisma, second facelift

Overview
- Manufacturer: Mitsubishi Motors
- Production: 1995–2004
- Assembly: Born, Netherlands (NedCar)
- Designer: Kiyoshi Honda

Body and chassis
- Class: Large family car (D-segment)
- Body style: 5-door liftback 4-door sedan
- Layout: Front-engine, front-wheel-drive Front-engine, four-wheel-drive
- Related: Mitsubishi Space Star; Volvo S40; Proton Waja; Hafei Saibao III

Powertrain
- Engine: 1.3 L 4G13 I4; 1.6 L 4G92 I4 (DA1); 1.8 L 4G93 I4 (DA2); 1.8 L 4G93 GDI I4; 1.9 L Renault F8Q TD I4; 1.9 L Renault F9Q DI-D I4 diesel
- Transmission: 5-speed manual 4-speed automatic

Dimensions
- Wheelbase: 2,550 mm (100.4 in)
- Length: 4,450 mm (175.2 in)
- Width: 1,695 mm (66.7 in)
- Height: 1,405 mm (55.3 in)
- Kerb weight: 1,105–1,180 kg (2,436–2,601 lb)

Chronology
- Predecessor: Mitsubishi Galant (Europe)
- Successor: Mitsubishi Lancer (Europe)

The Mitsubishi Carisma is a large family car that was produced for the European market by Mitsubishi Motors from 1995 to 2004.

The model name was derived from a combination of the English car and the Greek kharisma, meaning "divine gift". It was co-developed with Volvo, sharing its chassis with the first generation of the Volvo S40, and built at the NedCar factory in Born, Netherlands, which the two companies co-owned at the time. Over 350,000 were built during its production run. Volume production begun in May 1995 with sales starting in The Netherlands in June. The four-door saloon sales started the following year.

== Development ==
Available as a four door saloon or a five door hatchback style only, it featured inline four petrol engines from 1.3 L (introduced later in life) to 1.8 L, 1.8 L direct injection petrol engine from 1998, and 90 hp (67 kW) 1.9 L turbo-diesel powerplants sourced from Renault, later with the 100 hp (75 kW) 1.9 DI-D common rail diesel engine, the same as used in both Volvo and Renault cars. Mitsubishi claimed the 1.8 GDI engine offered a 20% saving in fuel consumption, 10% increase in power and 20% decrease in greenhouse gases when compared to a conventional 1.8 petrol engine.

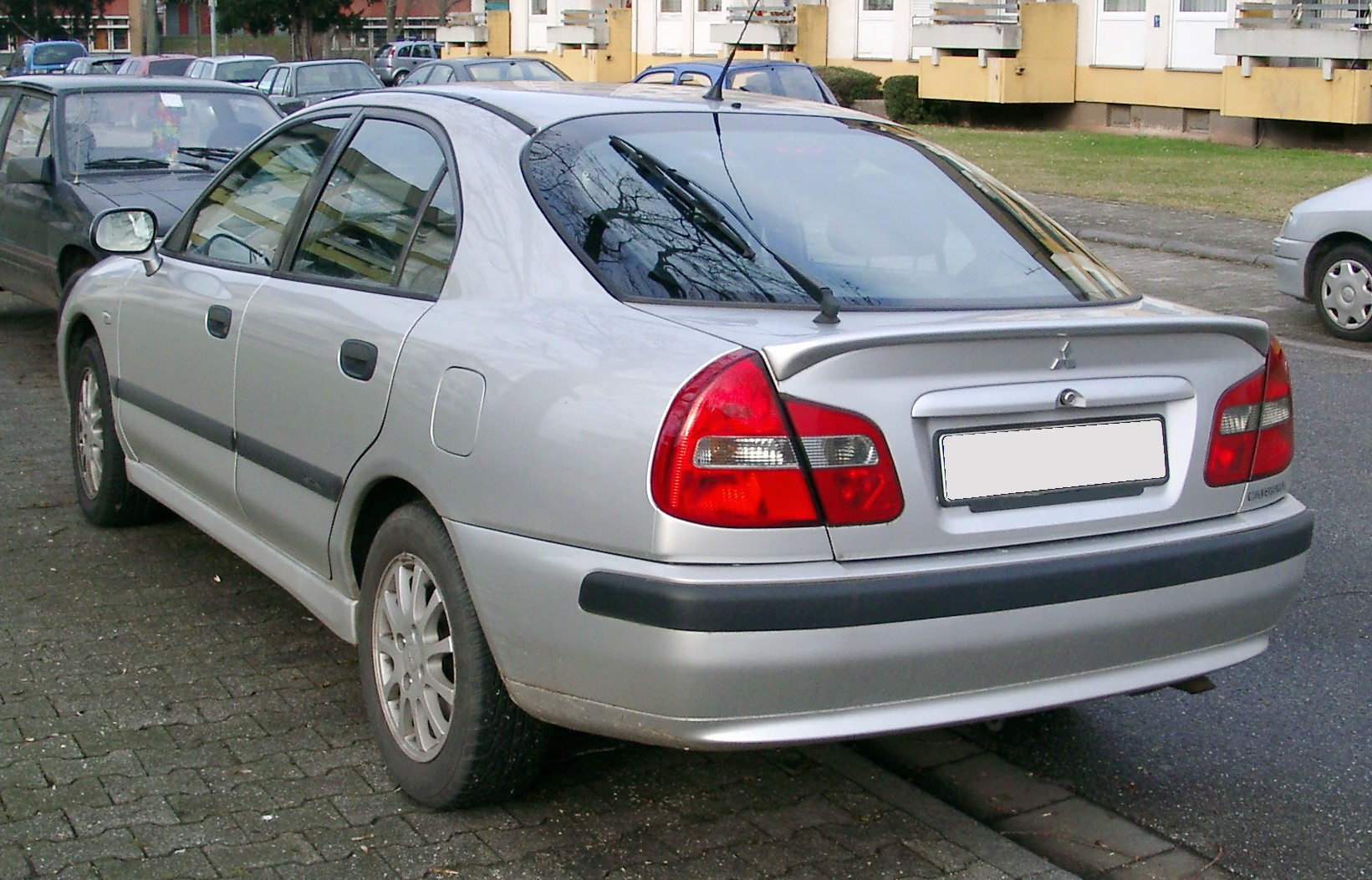
Rear of the Mitsubishi Carisma

The Carisma had a fairly neutral design as a result of being Mitsubishi's first attempt to target the traditionally conservative European company car market, where it competed with the likes of the Ford Mondeo.

The Carisma was facelifted in 1999, with the new models being launched in the UK on the 1st of August. This included a new front end, interior, boot lid and rear lights. It also featured ABS as standard, a wider front track and uprated suspension. The Carisma underwent a slight redesign again in 2002, with the main difference being new tinted headlights, new alloy wheel designs and black front grilles, instead of chrome. The car was placed between the Lancer and the Galant, although after production ended in December 2004, the Lancer took its place in Mitsubishi's European range.

In several markets where the Lancer was not available, the Evolution version was rebadged as the Mitsubishi Carisma GT. However, in France a special edition of the Carisma called the GT was available, and was featured alongside the Evolution rebadge in promotional brochures. In Japan, the Carisma was sold at a specific retail chain called Car Plaza. It was only available for 1996 and 1997 as a 1.8 saloon, with trim levels being L, LX and LS. The chassis was also used by Proton to develop the Proton Waja.

== Production and sales ==
Year	Production	Sales
1995	19,100	?
1996	44,401	?
1997	82,255	?
1998	78,239	?
1999	54,460	?
2000	29,800	38,548
2001	22,203	28,647
2002	28,776	30,429
2003	26,074	28,123
2004	–	9,875

(Sources: Fact & Figures 2000, Fact & Figures 2005, Mitsubishi Motors website)

== Gallery ==
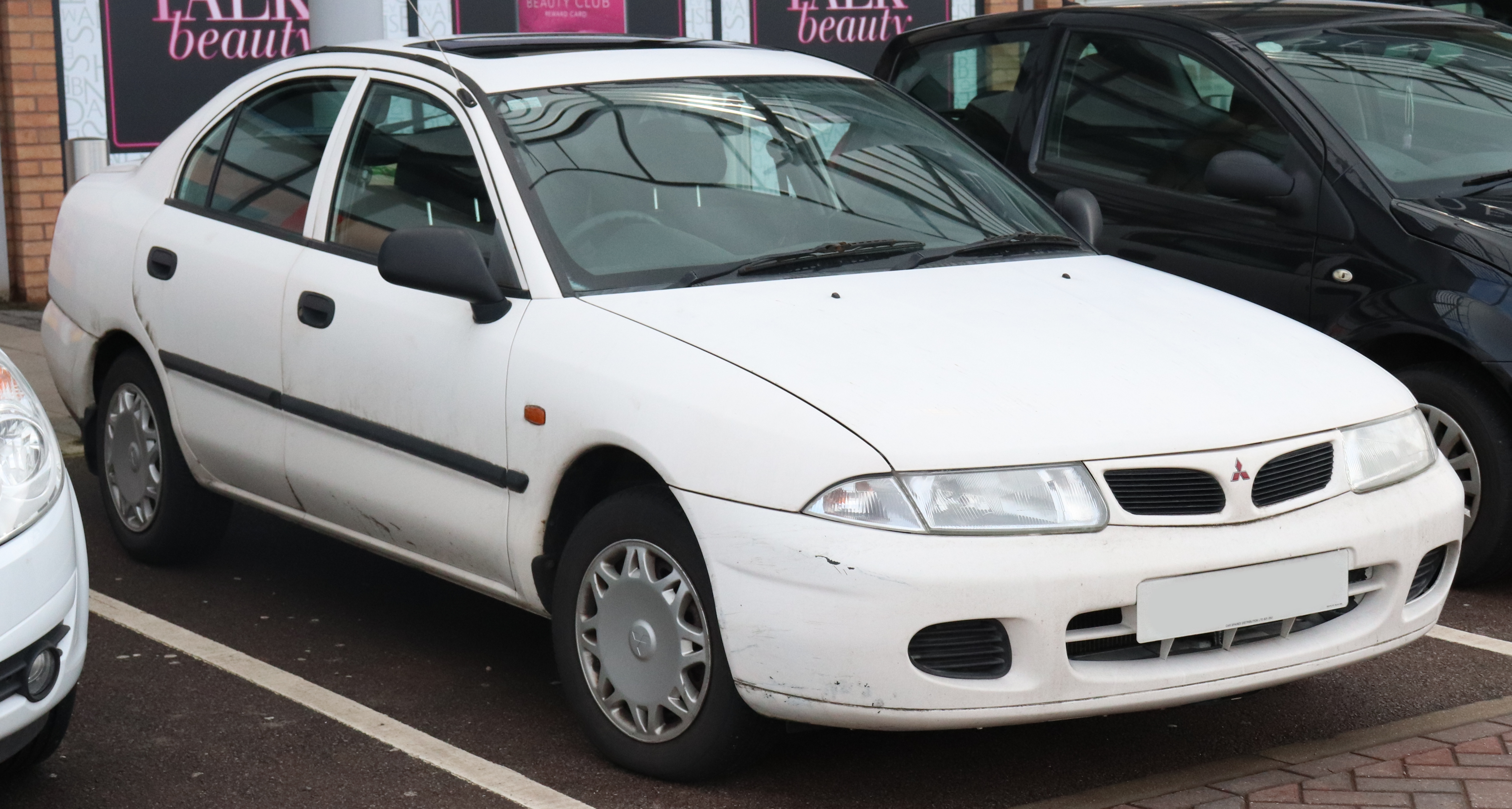
Carisma (1995–1999)

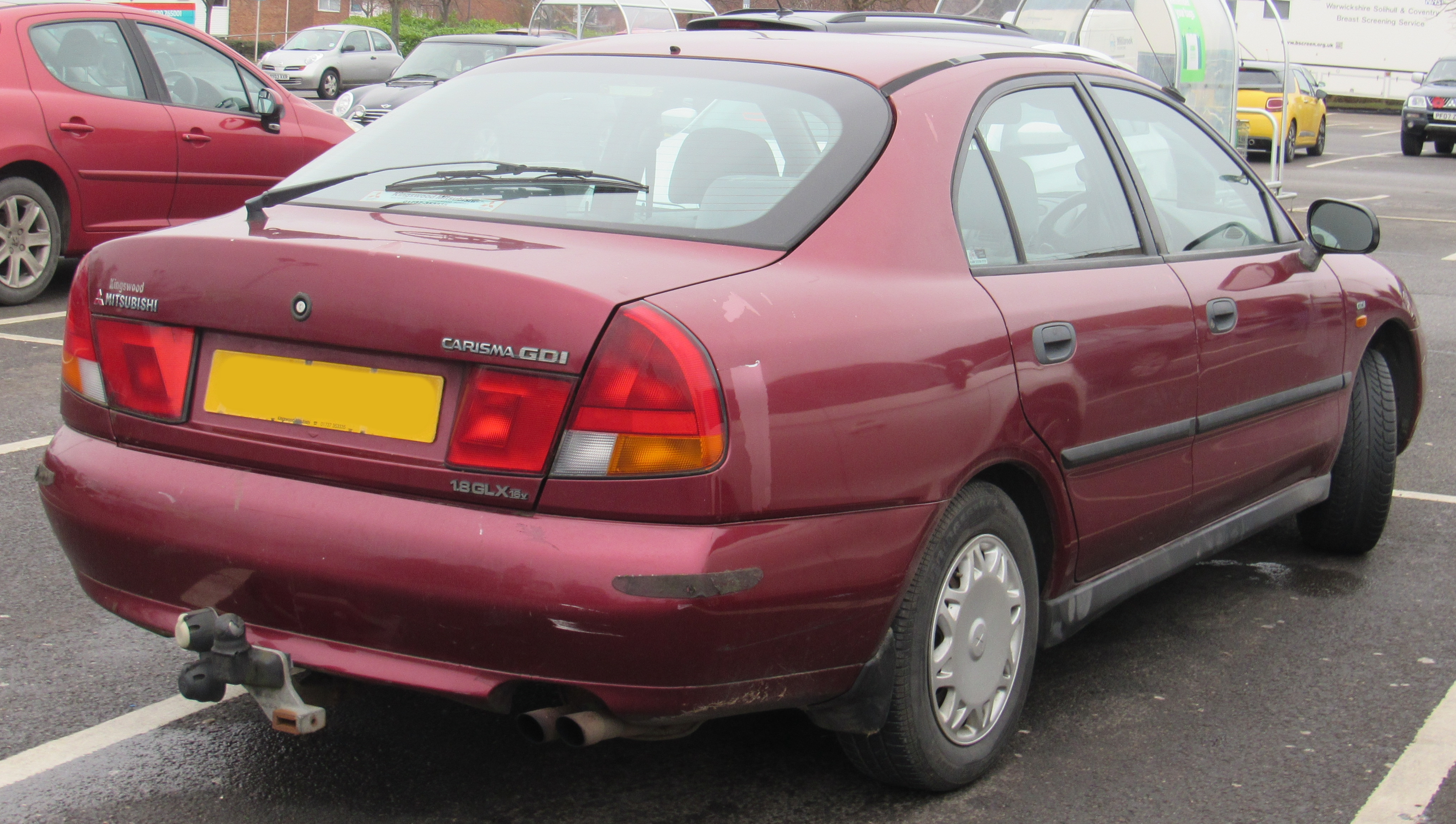
Carisma (1995–1999)

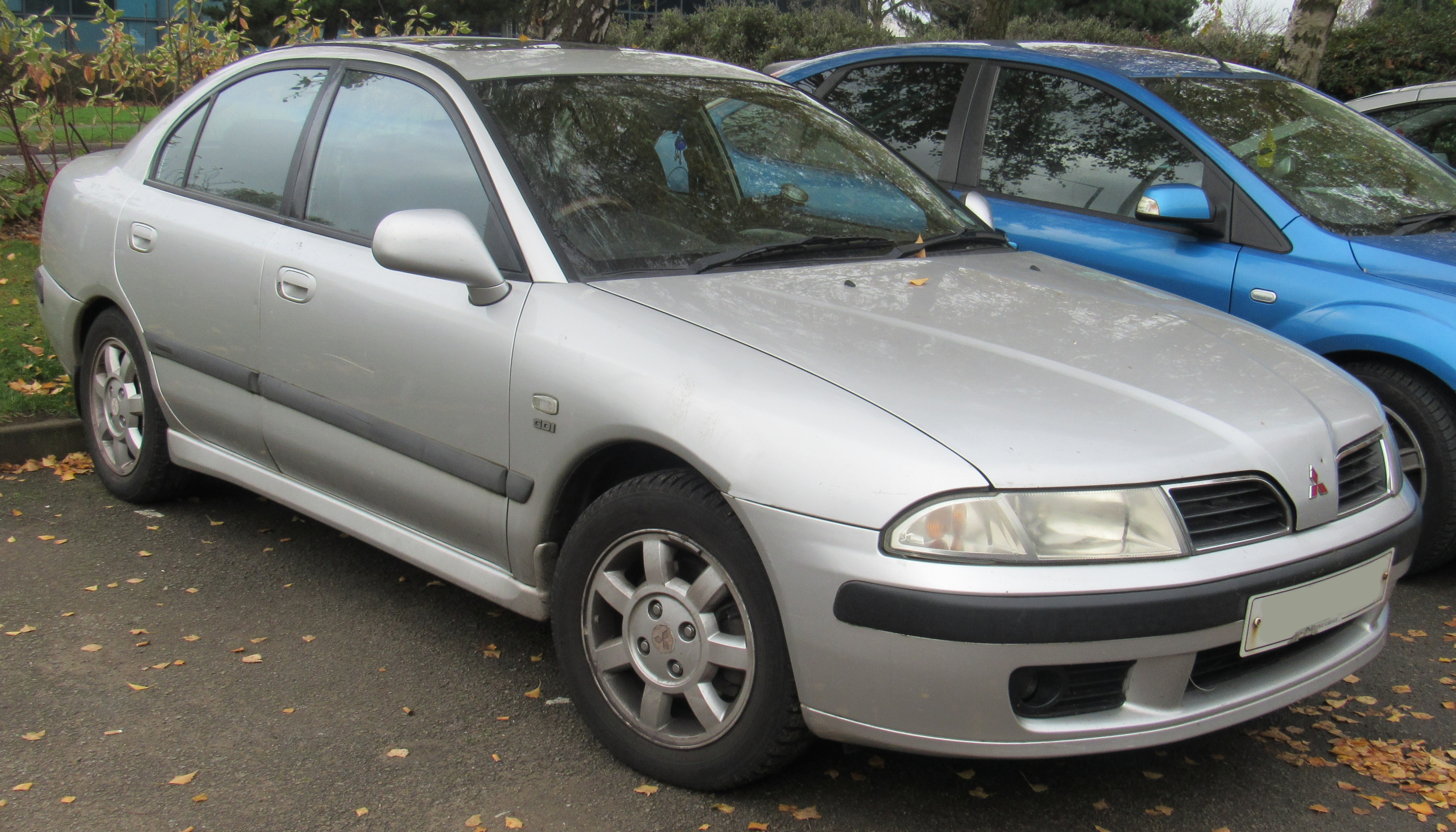
Carisma (1999–2002)

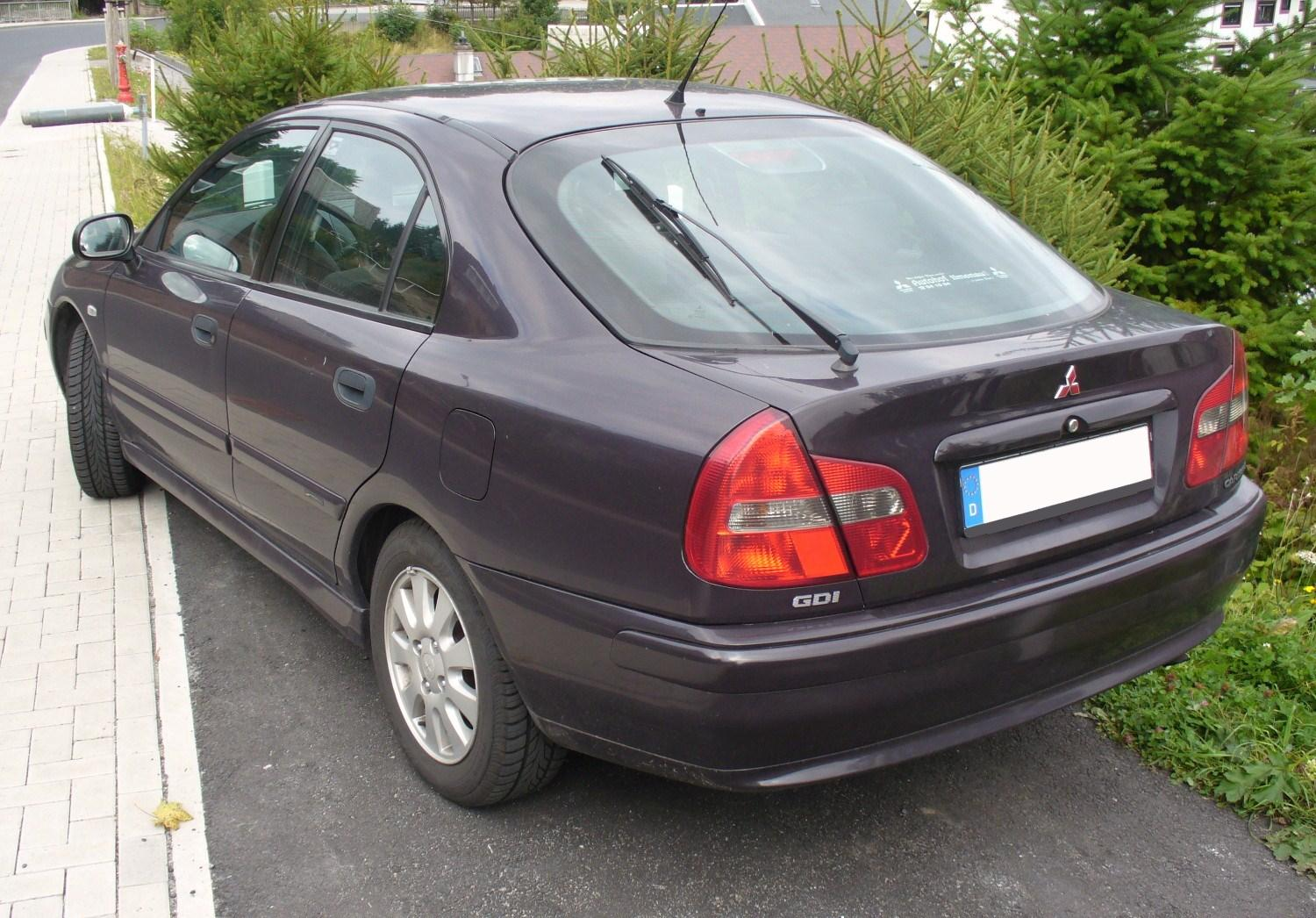
Carisma (1999–2002)

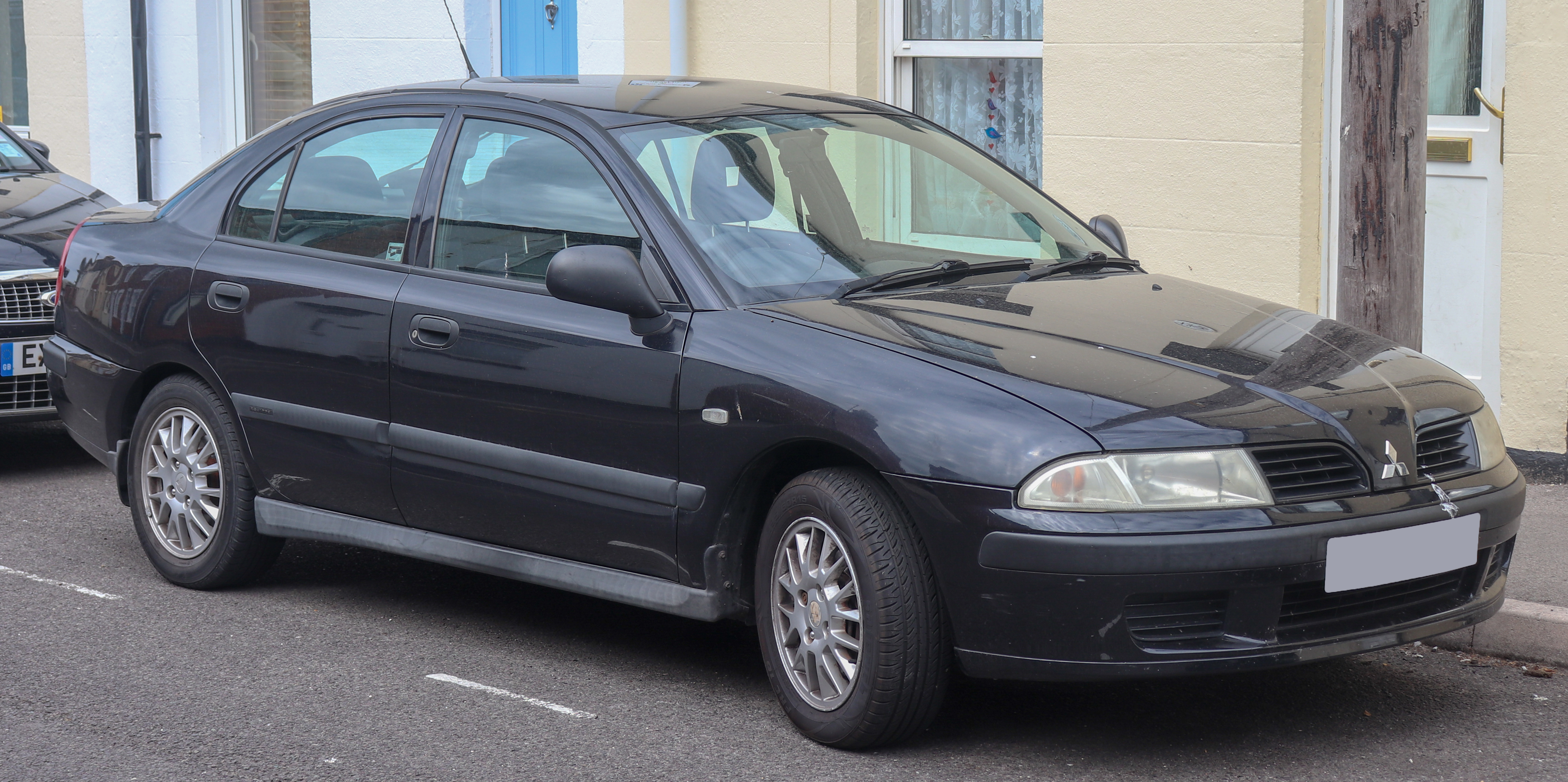
Carisma (2002–2004)

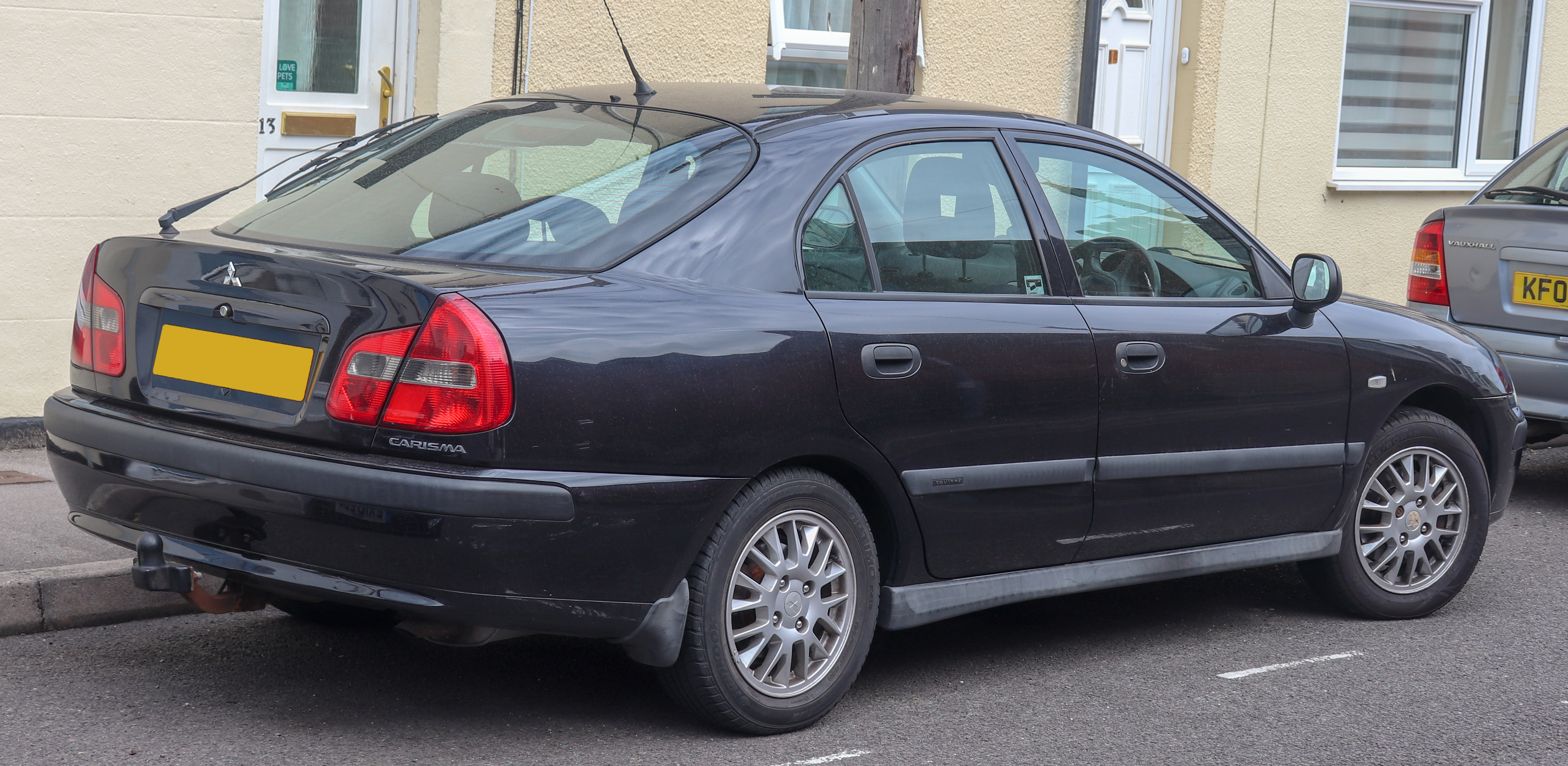
Carisma (2002–2004)

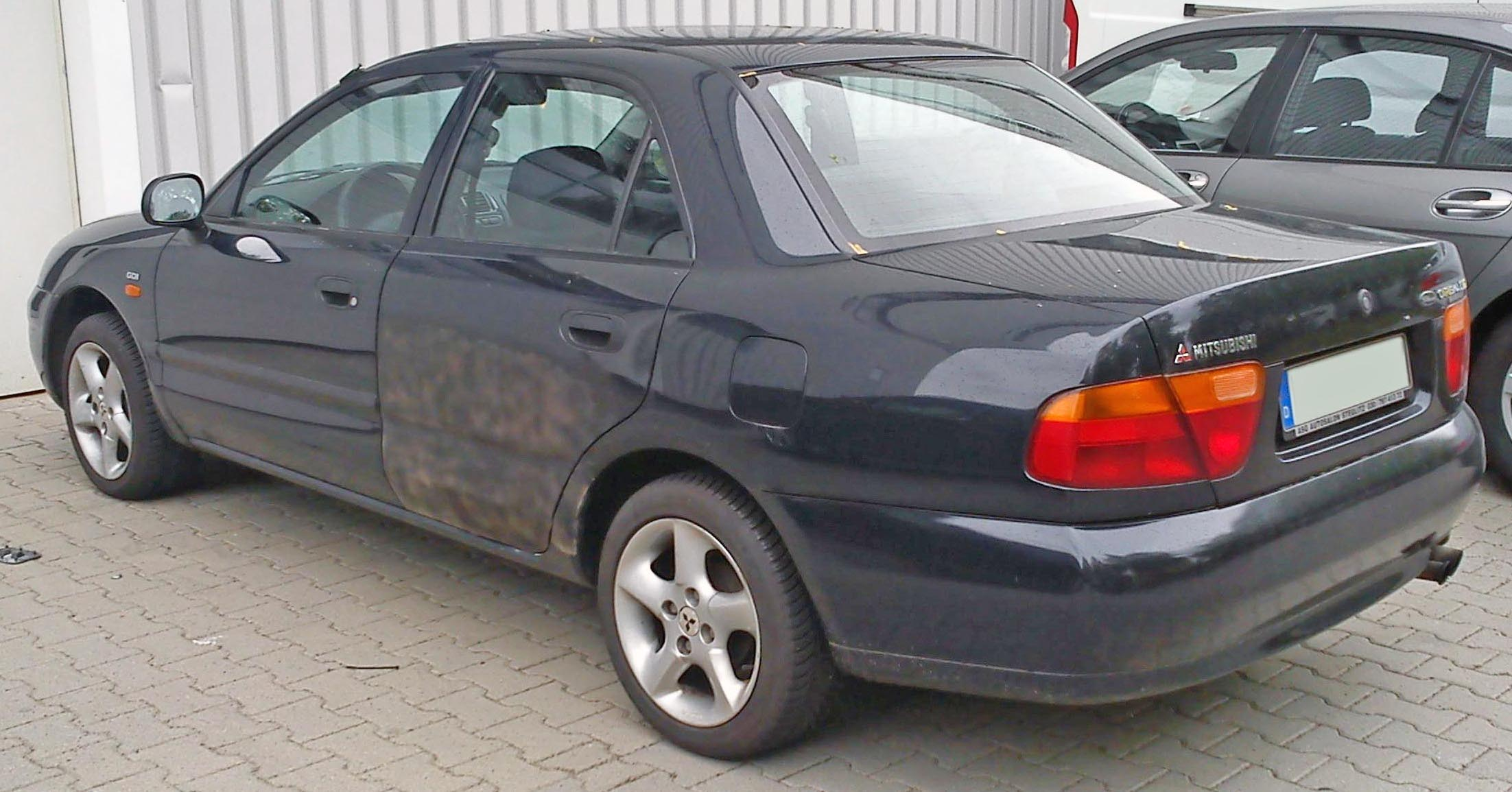
Carisma Saloon (1995–1999)

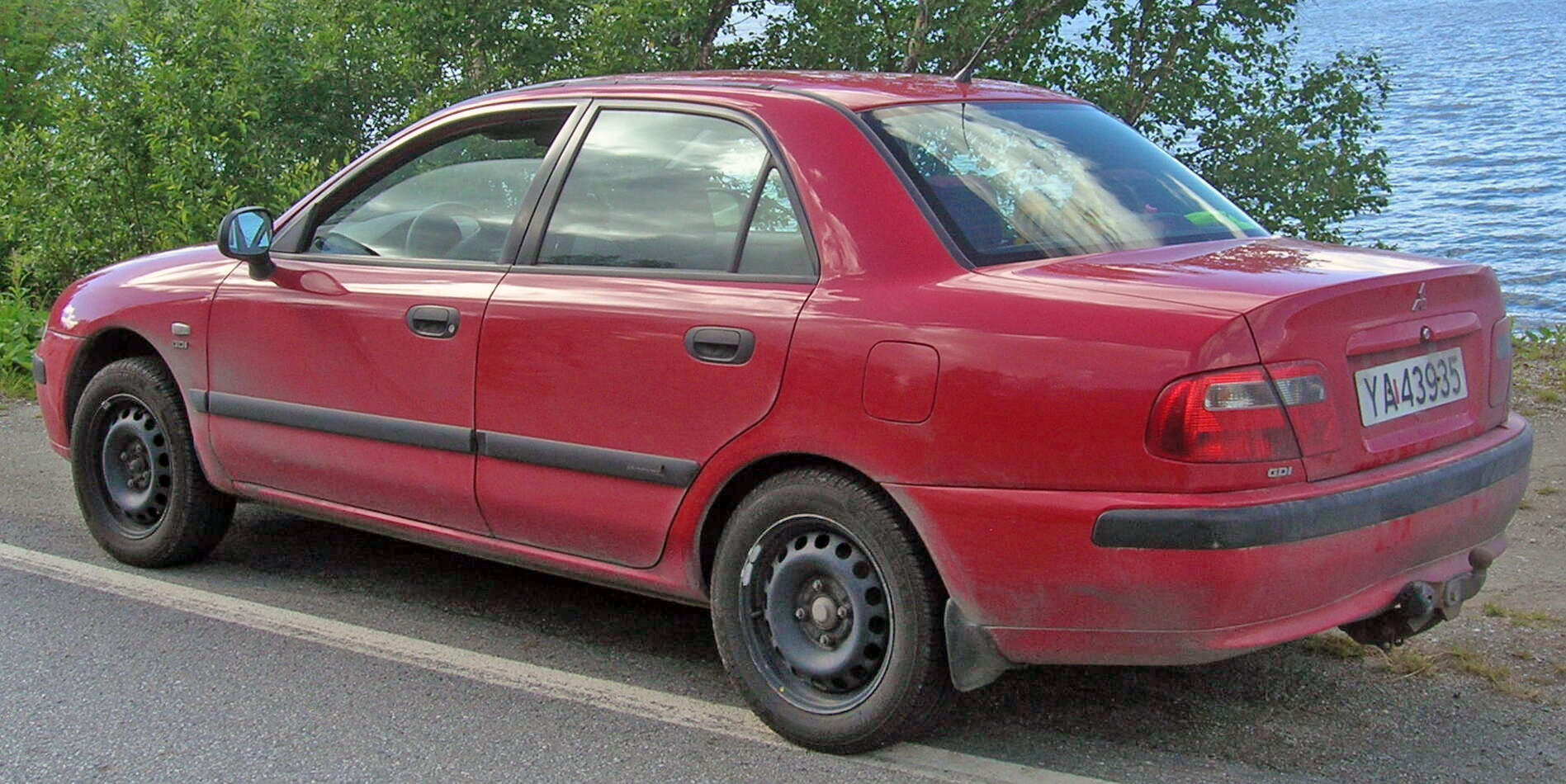
Carisma Saloon (1999–2002)

== Engines ==
Model	Engine	Displacement	Valvetrain	Fuel system	Max. power at rpm	Max. torque at rpm	Years
Petrol engines
1.3	Mitsubishi 4G13	1299 cc	SOHC 16v	Multi-point fuel injection	60 kW (82 PS; 80 bhp) at 5000 rpm	120 N⋅m (89 ft⋅lbf) at 4000 rpm	2001–2004
1.6	Mitsubishi 4G92	1597 cc	SOHC 16v	Multi-point fuel injection	66 kW (90 PS; 89 bhp) at 5500 rpm	137 N⋅m (101 ft⋅lbf) at 4000 rpm	1995–1997
1.6	Mitsubishi 4G92	1597 cc	SOHC 16v	Multi-point fuel injection	73 kW (99 PS; 98 bhp) at 5750 rpm	137 N⋅m (101 ft⋅lbf) at 4000 rpm	1997–2000
1.6	Mitsubishi 4G92	1597 cc	SOHC 16v	Multi-point fuel injection	76 kW (103 PS; 102 bhp) at 6000 rpm	141 N⋅m (104 ft⋅lbf) at 4500 rpm	2000–2004
1.8	Mitsubishi 4G93	1834 cc	SOHC 16v	Multi-point fuel injection	85 kW (116 PS; 114 bhp) at 5500 rpm	162 N⋅m (119 ft⋅lbf) at 4500 rpm	1995–1997
1.8 MSX	Mitsubishi 4G93	1834 cc	DOHC 16v	Multi-point fuel injection	103 kW (140 PS; 138 bhp) at 6500 rpm	167 N⋅m (123 ft⋅lbf) at 5000 rpm	1995–1997
1.8 GDI	Mitsubishi 4G93	1834 cc	DOHC 16v	Gasoline direct injection	92 kW (125 PS; 123 bhp) at 5500 rpm	174 N⋅m (128 ft⋅lbf) at 3750 rpm	1997–2000
1.8 GDI	Mitsubishi 4G93	1834 cc	DOHC 16v	Gasoline direct injection	90 kW (122 PS; 121 bhp) at 5500 rpm	174 N⋅m (128 ft⋅lbf) at 3750 rpm	2000–2003
Diesel engines
1.9 TD	Renault F8QT	1870 cc	SOHC 8v	Indirect injection	90 PS (66 kW; 89 bhp) at 4250 rpm	176 N⋅m (130 ft⋅lbf) at 2250 rpm	1997–2000
1.9 DI-D	Renault F9Q1	1870 cc	SOHC 8v	Common rail direct injection	102 PS (75 kW; 101 bhp) at 4000 rpm	215 N⋅m (159 ft⋅lbf) at 1800 rpm	2000–2004
1.9 DI-D	Renault F9Q2	1870 cc	SOHC 8v	Common rail direct injection	115 PS (85 kW; 113 bhp) at 4000 rpm	265 N⋅m (195 ft⋅lbf) at 1800 rpm	2000–2004
