= Nissan SR20DET =

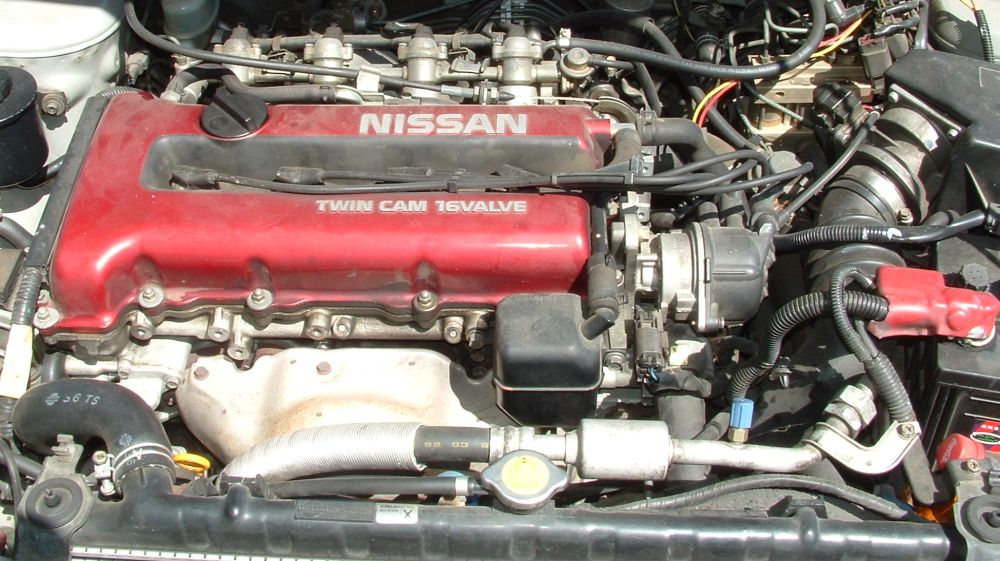
- Nissan SR20DET engine in a U13 Bluebird (FWD/AWD layout)

Overview
- Manufacturer: Nissan (Nissan Techno)
- Production: 1989–2002

Layout
- Configuration: Straight-four
- Displacement: 2.0 L (1,998 cc)
- Cylinder bore: 86 mm (3.39 in)
- Piston stroke: 86 mm (3.39 in)
- Cylinder block material: Aluminum
- Cylinder head material: Aluminum
- Valvetrain: DOHC 4 valves x cyl.
- Valvetrain drive system: Timing chain
- Compression ratio: 8.3:1, 8.5:1

Combustion
- Turbocharger: Garrett S13 T25, S14 T28, S15 T28 BB
- Fuel system: Electronic fuel injection
- Fuel type: Gasoline
- Cooling system: Water-cooled

Output
- Power output: From 204 PS (150 kW; 201 hp) to 250 PS (184 kW; 247 hp)
- Torque output: From 266 N⋅m (196 lb⋅ft) to 280 N⋅m (207 lb⋅ft)

Chronology
- Predecessor: CA18DET
- Successor: QR20DE

The SR20DET is a 2.0 L (1,998 cc) straight-four four-stroke gasoline engine that is part of the SR family of engines from Nissan, produced from 1989 to 2002. It is a turbocharged version of the SR20DE engine.

The SR20DE and SR20DET replaced the outgoing CA18DE and CA18DET from the preceding CA family of engines, which no longer met Japanese emissions standards and were too expensive to manufacture (due to its cast-iron block). The SR20DET was Nissan's popular four-cylinder turbocharged engine fitted into a wide variety of cars, most notably the S13-chassis Silvia and 180SX, as well as the Pulsar GTI-R and Bluebird. The previous CA18DET engine originally powered the Silvia and 180SX from the S12-chassis and prior, including the early S13-chassis models.

The SR20DET is a popular choice for an engine swap in several cars, most notably the 240SX sold in the United States and Canada. These were fitted with the SOHC KA24E for earlier models and the DOHC KA24DE for later models, all of which are naturally aspirated engines and had less power than the CA18DET and SR20DET engines used in its Japanese counterparts, producing about 140 hp (100 kW) and 155 hp (116 kW) respectively.

Engine swaps for the SR20DET have become more commonplace due to a wide variety of aftermarket forced induction options for the engine. There are many tuning shops around the world that specialize exclusively in SR20DET engine swaps.

== Model code breakdown ==
The breakdown of the engine codes are as follows:

- SR - Engine family
- 20 - 2.0 liter displacement
- D - Dual overhead camshaft
- E - Multi-port fuel injection
- T - Turbocharger

NOTE: The lack of a "D" in some engine identifications indicates an SOHC cylinder head.

For more information of Nissan's engine naming conventions, see list of Nissan engines.

== History ==
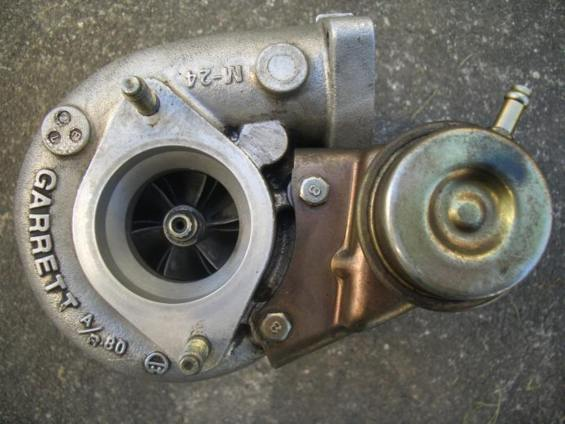
Garrett T25G turbo used on most SR20DET engines

The SR20DET was first introduced in the U12 Nissan Bluebird 2000SSS ATTESA Limited in a transverse-mounted front-wheel drive/four-wheel drive form in October 1989. The first revisions of the rear-wheel drive S13 Silvia and 180SX produced in 1991 had a longitudinally-mounted SR20DET, with some models using the naturally aspirated SR20DE. This engine went on to be used in a number of Nissan vehicles, including the Avenir in 1995, the R'nessa in 1997 and the Liberty in 1999. The SR20DET (along with the naturally-aspirated SR20DE) was retired on most Nissan vehicles in August 2002 (which includes vehicles such as the S15 Silvia as it used the SR20DE/SR20DET engines), and were replaced with the QR20DE engine in most applications.

Out of all the Nissan models produced with the SR20DET engine, the Silvia was the longest-running model to use it, beginning with the S13 series in 1991 and ending with the S15 series in 2002. The S14 and S15 series used a bigger turbocharger than the S13 series.

== Valve cover colors ==
The colors of the valve covers seem to relate to the year the engine was produced:

Color	Model	Years
Red	S13/180SX/Bluebird/Pulsar	1989–1994
Black	S13/180SX	1994–1998
Black	S14/S15	1994–2002
Silver	Avenir/R'nessa	1995–2002/1997–2001

- 1989–1994 "Red top" - Came from U12/13 Bluebird, S13 Silvia and 180SX pre-94 (Garrett T25G turbo) 370cc injectors were used.
- 1994–1998 "Black top" - Came from 180SX's post-94 (Garrett T25G turbo)
- 1994–1998 "Black top VCT" - 94–98 Silvias - Variable Cam Timing or VCT was introduced on the intake cam (Garrett T28 journal bearing turbo for Australian and European markets and Garrett T28 Ball Bearing turbo for the Japanese market) 370cc injectors were used.
- 1995–2002 "Silver top" - 95-02 Avenirs and 97-01 R'nessas.
- 1999–2002 "Black top" or "Notch top" - 99–02 Silvias. Same VCT as above, 6-speed manual transmission (Garrett Journal Bearing T28 for Europe and Australia and Ball Bearing T28 turbo for Japan) 480cc injectors were used and the intake manifold was redesigned.

== Engine specifications ==
- DOHC 4 valves per cylinder, Chain driven cam sprockets
- Bore × Stroke of 86 mm (3.39 in) × 86 mm (3.39 in)
- Displacement of 1,998 cc (2.0 L; 121.9 cu in)

1990–1994 RNN14 Pulsar GTI-R

- Compressor Flow: 33 lb/MIN
- Throttle Body: Quad
- Injector Flow: 440cc/min
- Ignition Timing: 20º BTDC

1991–1994 S13 Silvia & 1991–1998 180SX

- Throttle Body Bore: 60 mm
- Injector Flow: 370cc/min

1995–1999 S14 Silvia

- Throttle Body Bore: 50 mm
- Injector Flow: 370cc/min

1999–2002 S15 Silvia

- Throttle Body Bore: 50 mm
- Injector Flow: 444cc/min

=== Comparison table ===
Car	Engine	Compression	Power	Torque	Turbo	Stock boost	Turbine	Compressor
'89 U12 Bluebird Ltd	Redtop	8.5:1	150 kW (201 hp) @ 6000 rpm	202 lb⋅ft (274 N⋅m) @ 4000 rpm	T-25g	14psi		
'91–'95 U13 Bluebird Ltd	Redtop	8.5:1	154 kW (206 hp) @ 6000 rpm	202 lb⋅ft (274 N⋅m) @ 4000 rpm	T-25G	7psi		
'95–'97 W10 Avenir Salut	Silvertop	8.5:1	154 kW (206 hp) @ 6000 rpm	202 lb⋅ft (274 N⋅m) @ 4000 rpm	T-25G	7psi		
'97–'01 W11 Avenir GT4	Silvertop	8.5:1	169 kW (227 hp) @ 6000 rpm	203 lb⋅ft (275 N⋅m) @ 3600 rpm	T-25BB	9psi		
'90–'94 RNN14 Pulsar GTI-R	Redtop	8.3:1	169 kW (227 hp) @ 6400 rpm	210 lb⋅ft (280 N⋅m) @ 4800 rpm	T-28	10.6psi	79 Trim 53 mm (2.1 in) (Inconel), .86 A/R housing	60 trim 60 mm BCI-1 in T-3 housing
'90–'95 EGNN14 Sunny GTI-R	Redtop	8.3:1	164 kW (220 hp) @ 6400 rpm	196 lb⋅ft (266 N⋅m) @ 4800 rpm	T-28	10.6psi	79 Trim 53 mm (2.1 in) (Inconel), .86 A/R housing	60 trim 60 mm BCI-1 in T-3 housing
'91–'93 S13 Silvia, 180SX	Redtop	8.5:1	151 kW (205 hp) @ 6000 rpm	203 lb⋅ft (275 N⋅m) @ 4000 rpm	T-25G	7psi	62 trim 53.8 mm (2.1 in), .80 A/R housing	60 trim 56mm BCI-1
'94–'98 S13 180SX	Blacktop	8.5:1	151 kW (205 hp) @ 6000 rpm	203 lb⋅ft (275 N⋅m) @ 4000 rpm	T-25G	7psi	62 trim 53.8 mm (2.1 in), .80 A/R housing	60 trim 56mm BCI-1
'95–'99 S14 Silvia, '95-'99 200SX (Australia, New Zealand)	Blacktop (Notchtop)	8.5:1	162 kW (217 hp) @ 6000 rpm	205 lb⋅ft (278 N⋅m) @ 4800 rpm	T-28	7psi, 14psi BB	62 trim 53.8 mm (2.1 in), .64 A/R housing, BB if from the JDM	60 trim 60 mm BCI-1 in T-04B housing
'99–'02 S15 Silvia, '99-'02 200SX (New Zealand)	Blacktop (Notchtop)	8.5:1	184 kW (247 hp) @ 6400 rpm	203 lb⋅ft (275 N⋅m) @ 4800 rpm	T-28BB	7psi stock	62 trim 53.8 mm (2.1 in) (Inconel), .64 A/R housing, cast divider wall between turbine discharge and wastegate, ball bearing center section	60 trim 60 mm BCI-1 in T-04B housing
'00-'02 200SX (Australia)	Blacktop (Notchtop)	8.5:1	147 kW (197 hp) @ 6400 rpm	161 lb⋅ft (218 N⋅m) @ 4800 rpm	T-28BB	7psi stock	62 trim 53.8 mm (2.1 in) (Inconel), .64 A/R housing, cast divider wall between turbine discharge and wastegate, ball bearing center section	60 trim 60 mm BCI-1 in T-04B housing

== Twin-turbo modifications ==
While all factory manufactured SR20DET's had a single turbo unit, there have been some working twin-turbo versions of the SR20DET made by certain aftermarket tuners. One such kit was produced by ENDLESS Japan in 2008, featuring two GReddy TD05-16G turbines in parallel and mated to a custom exhaust manifold and downpipe. Modifications to the engine bay were required in order for the twin-turbo setup to fit in correctly, as it would not be able to fit properly on an unmodified engine bay. This setup achieved its peak power at 2.2 bar between 5,500–6,000 rpm, and costs ¥300,000.

== Applications ==
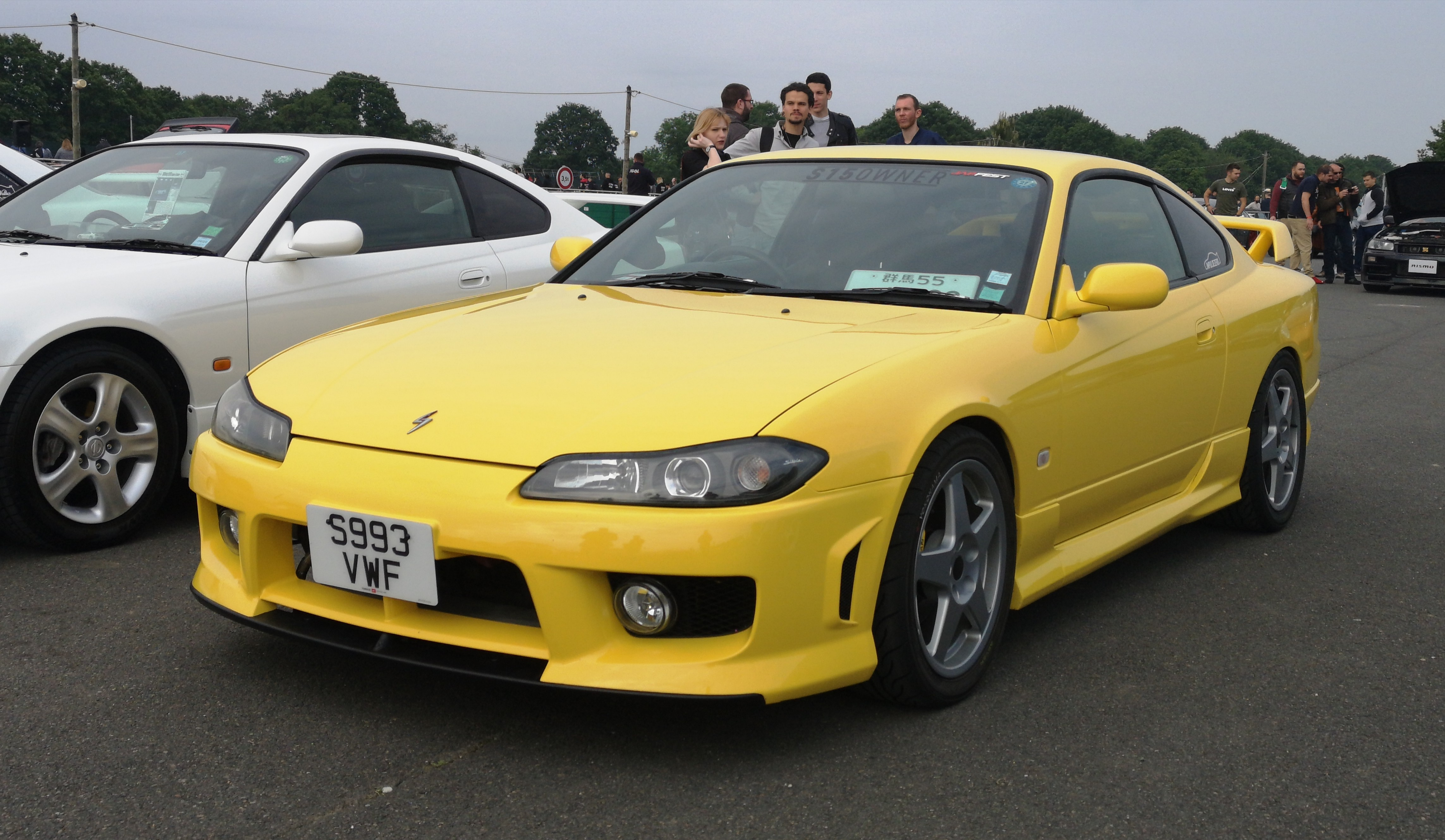
1999 Nissan Silvia Spec-R (S15), which uses the SR20DET

The SR20DET was used in a number of front-wheel drive, all-wheel drive, and rear-wheel drive Nissan vehicles produced from 1989 to 2002, including the Nissan Silvia line of small compact rear-wheel drive sports cars. The following below is a list of these, categorized by its use in transversal or longitudinal configurations.

=== List of vehicles using the SR20DET ===
Model	Spec	Chassis	Years	Colour	Turbo	Market
Transversal
Bluebird	2000SSS Attesa Limited	U12	1989	Red top	T25G	Japan
	2000SSS Attesa Limited	U13	91–93	Red top	T25G	Japan
	2000SSS Attesa Limited	U13	94–95	Black top	T25G	Japan
Pulsar	GTI-R	RNN14	90–94	Red top	T28	Japan
Sunny	GTI-R	EGNN14	90–95	Red top	T28	Europe
Avenir	GT Turbo Salut	W10	95,97	Silver top	T25G	Japan
	GT4	W11	98,00–02	Silver top	T25BB	Japan
Liberty	GT4 Highway Star	M12	99–00			Japan
R'nessa	GT Turbo	N30	97–01	Silver top	T25BB	Japan
Longitudinal
180SX	All	S13	91–93	Red top	T25G	Japan
	All (except G/Type S)	S13	94–97	Black top	T25G	Japan
Silvia	K's	S13	91–93	Red top	T25G	Japan
	K's	S14	94–99	Black top	T28 (VTC), T28BB if JDM	Japan
	Autech Version K's MF-T	S14	98–99	Black top	IHI VN14 (VTC)	Japan
	270R	S14	1994	Black top		Japan
	Spec-R	S15	99–02	Black top (Notch top)	T28BB (VTC)	Japan
200SX		S14	93–99	Black top	(VTC)	Europe
	Spec-R	S15	99–02	Black top (Notch top)	T28BB (VTC)	New Zealand
	Spec-S & Spec-R	S15	00–02	Black top (Notch top)	T28BB (VTC)	Australia

== See also ==
- List of Nissan engines
