= Mitsubishi 4G9 engine =

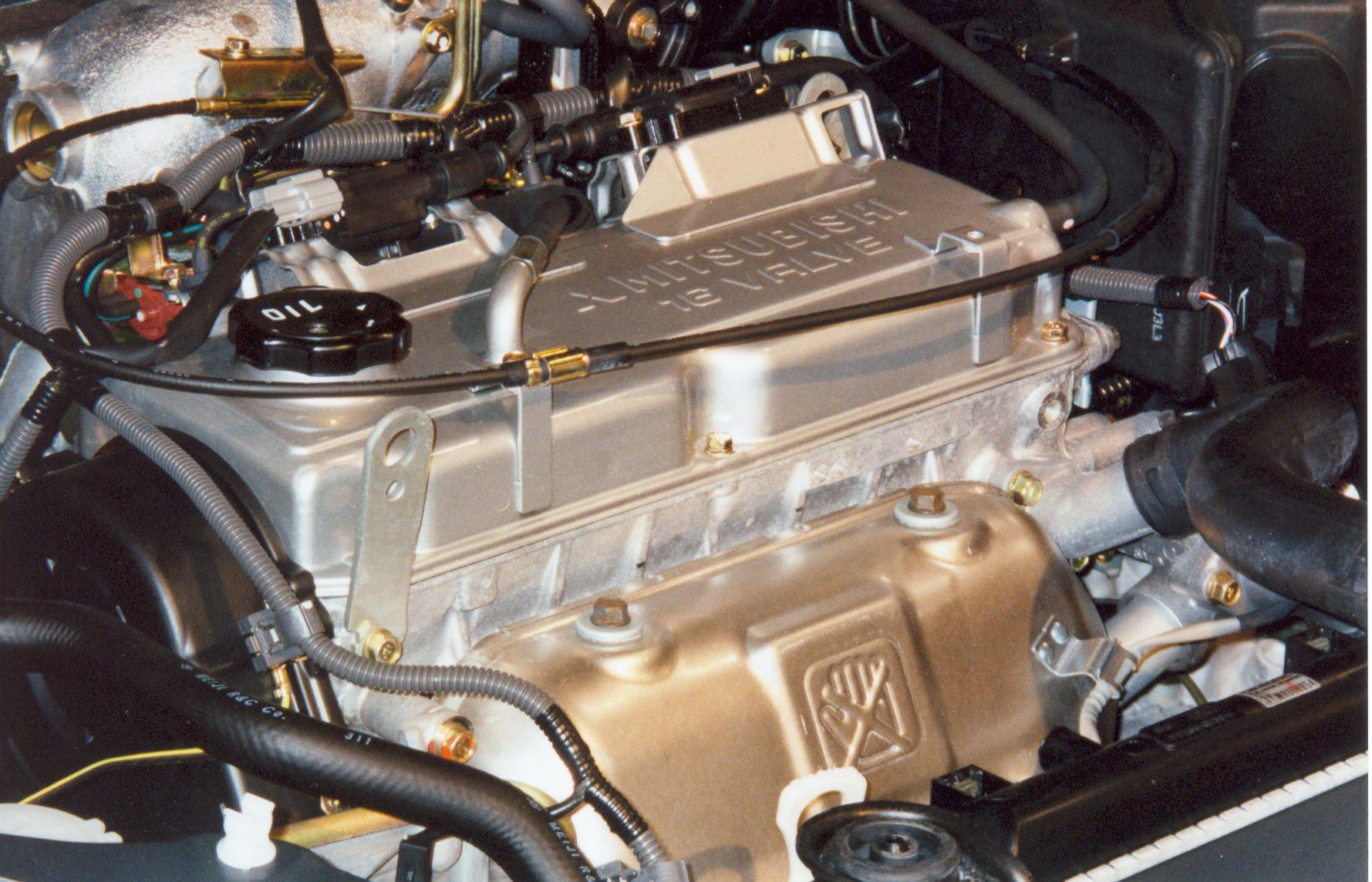

Overview
- Manufacturer: Mitsubishi Motors
- Production: 1991–2007

Layout
- Configuration: Straight-4
- Displacement: 1.5 L (1,496 cc); 1.6 L (1,597 cc); 1.8 L (1,834 cc); 2.0 L (1,999 cc)
- Cylinder bore: 78.4 mm (3.09 in); 81 mm (3.19 in); 81.5 mm (3.21 in)
- Piston stroke: 77.5 mm (3.05 in); 89 mm (3.5 in); 95.8 mm (3.77 in)
- Cylinder block material: Cast iron
- Cylinder head material: Aluminum
- Valvetrain: SOHC, DOHC 4 valves x cyl. with MIVEC (some versions)
- Compression ratio: 8.5:1, 9.5:1, 10.0:1, 10.5:1, 11.0:1, 12.0:1

Combustion
- Turbocharger: TD04 (on 4G93T)
- Fuel system: Direct injection
- Fuel type: Gasoline
- Cooling system: Water cooled

Output
- Power output: 94–215 PS (69–158 kW; 93–212 hp)
- Torque output: 126–284 N⋅m (93–209 lb⋅ft)

The Mitsubishi 4G9 engine is a series of straight-4 automobile engines produced by Mitsubishi Motors. All are 16-valve, and use both single- and double- overhead camshaft heads. Some feature MIVEC variable valve timing, and it was the first modern gasoline direct injection engine upon its introduction in August 1996.

== 4G91 ==
The 4G91 uses a bore and stroke of 78.4 mm × 77.5 mm (3.09 in × 3.05 in) for a total displacement of 1.5 L (1,496 cc). With a 9.5:1 compression ratio and DOHC, four-valve-per-cylinder head and multi-point EFI, this engine produces 115 PS (85 kW; 113 hp) at 6,000 rpm and 135 N⋅m (100 lb⋅ft) at 5,000 rpm. The 4G91 was a short-lived model, mainly built between 1991 and 1995 and rarely seen in export markets. There was also a carbureted model, with 97 PS (71 kW; 96 hp) at 6,000 rpm and 126 N⋅m (93 lb⋅ft) at 3,500 rpm.

Applications

- Mitsubishi Lancer
- Mitsubishi Mirage
- Proton Wira

== 4G92 ==
The 4G92 displaces 1.6 L (1,597 cc). It first appeared in the late-1991 Japanese-spec Mirage RS and Super R in DOHC form. The 4G92 is basically a version of the 4G91 with the bore increased to 81 mm (3.19 in). In the original DOHC 16V form it produces 120 PS (88 kW; 118 hp). Later, a fuel-efficient SOHC version was added, but the 4G92 is best known in its high-performance MIVEC equipped DOHC version, which fully replaced "ordinary" DOHC in 1993. Power output was raised as high as 170 PS (125 kW; 168 hp), as found in the JDM Mirage Cyborg-ZR and 1992 Lancer MR, making it one of the most powerful 1.6-litre naturally aspirated engines. A modular displacement (MD) version of the 4G92 MIVEC was also produced – MD is Mitsubishi's cylinder deactivation system which helps improve fuel consumption.

4G92P SOHC 16 Valve

- Total Displacement - 1.6 L (1,597 cc)
- Bore - 81 mm (3.19 in)
- Stroke - 77.5 mm (3.05 in)
- Compression Ratio - 10.0:1
- Maximum Output (1) - 83 kW (113 PS; 111 bhp) at 6,000 rpm, and 137 N⋅m (101 lb⋅ft) at 5,000 rpm
- Maximum Output (2) - 69 kW (94 PS; 93 bhp) at 5,500 rpm, and 135 N⋅m (100 lb⋅ft) at 4,000 rpm
  - (1): Early European and JDM versions with 20°/42° intake and 54°/2° exhaust valve timing
  - (2): General export and later European versions with 14°/58° intake and 52°/16° exhaust valve timing

4G92 DOHC 16 Valve

- Total Displacement - 1.6 L (1,597 cc)
- Bore - 81 mm (3.19 in)
- Stroke - 77.5 mm (3.05 in)
- Compression Ratio - 11.0:1
- Maximum Output - 107 kW (145 PS; 143 bhp) at 7,000 rpm
- Maximum Torque - 149 N⋅m (110 lb⋅ft) at 4,500 rpm

4G92-MIVEC DOHC 16 Valve

- Total Displacement - 1.6 L (1,597 cc)
- Bore - 81 mm (3.19 in)
- Stroke - 77.5 mm (3.05 in)
- Compression Ratio - 11.0:1
- Maximum Output - 125 kW (170 PS; 168 bhp) at 7,500 rpm
- Maximum Torque - 167 N⋅m (123 lb⋅ft) at 7,000 rpm

Applications

- Mitsubishi Lancer
- Mitsubishi Mirage
- Mitsubishi Carisma
- Mitsubishi Delica
- Proton Wira
- Proton Satria

== 4G93 ==
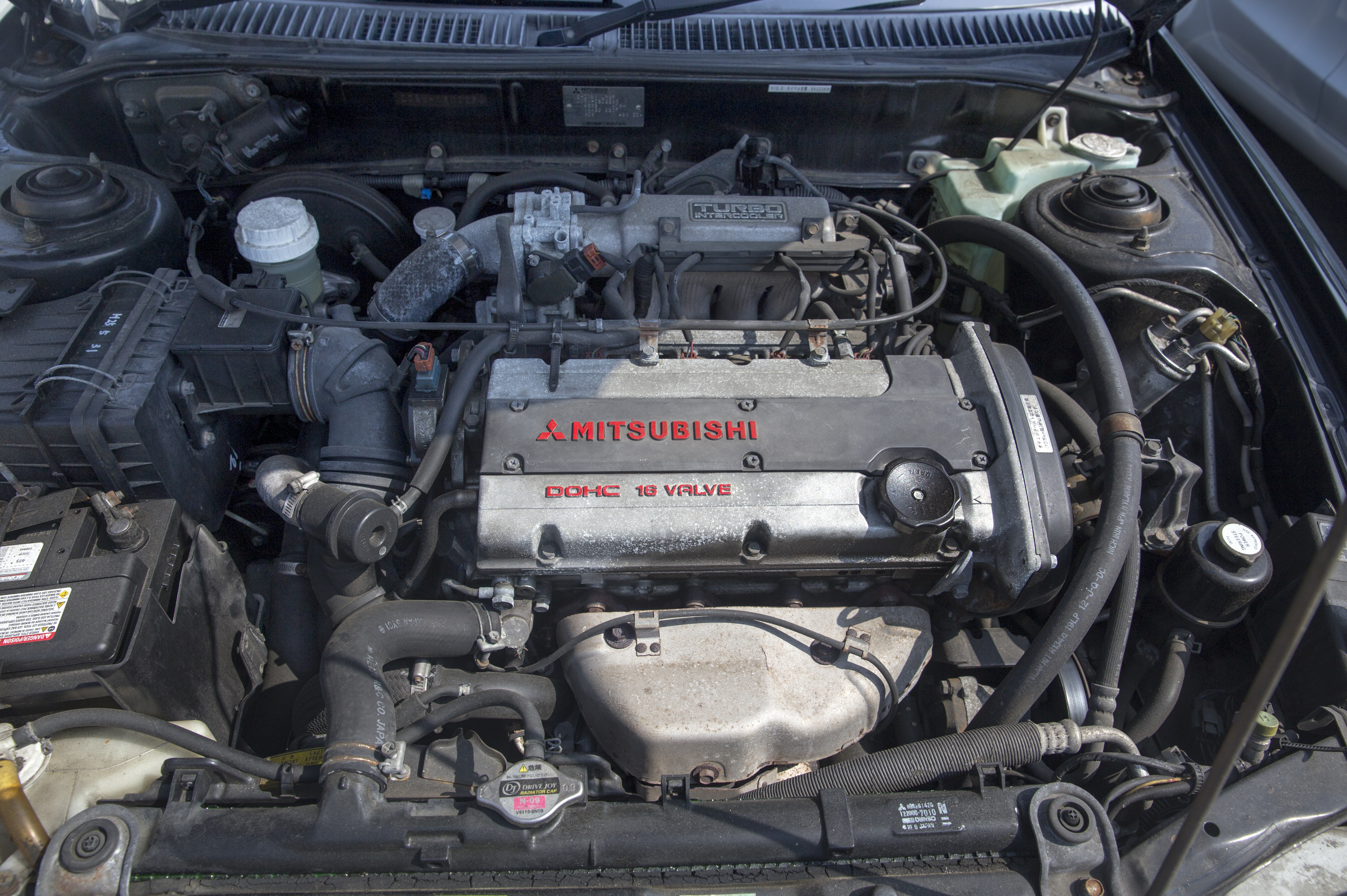
The turbocharged 4G93 engine in a Mitsubishi Libero GT.

The 4G93 is a 1.8 L (1,834 cc) engine available in both SOHC and DOHC versions. Turbocharged variants are also produced. In mid 1996 Mitsubishi released a gasoline direct injection (GDI) version of the 4G93. This GDI model saw a production of over a million units though it was a heavy polluter therefore only sold in the Japanese market. A partially cleaned up version (with less power) was later sold in Europe, and was among the first of the modern GDI engines. It brought good fuel economy and, if well serviced, long engine life.

4G93 SOHC 16 Valve MPI

- Multi-Point Injection (MPI)
- Total Displacement - 1.8 L (1,834 cc)
- Bore - 81 mm (3.19 in)
- Stroke - 89 mm (3.5 in)
- Compression Ratio - 9.5:1
- Maximum Output - 86 kW (117 PS; 115 bhp)
- Maximum Torque - 166 N⋅m (122 lb⋅ft)

4G93 SOHC 16 Valve Carburetor

- Carburetor
- Total Displacement - 1.8 L (1,834 cc)
- Bore - 81 mm (3.19 in)
- Stroke - 89 mm (3.5 in)
- Compression Ratio - 9.5:1
- Maximum Output - 74 kW (101 PS; 99 bhp)
- Maximum Torque - 154 N⋅m (114 lb⋅ft)

4G93 DOHC 16 Valve MPI

- Multi-Point Injection (MPI)
- Total Displacement - 1.8 L (1,834 cc)
- Bore - 81 mm (3.19 in)
- Stroke - 89 mm (3.5 in)
- Compression Ratio - 10.5:1
- Maximum Output - 103 kW (140 PS; 138 bhp) @ 6,500 rpm
- Maximum Torque - 167 N⋅m (123 lb⋅ft) @ 5500 rpm

4G93T DOHC 16 Valve Turbo

- Multi-Point Injection (MPI) with TD04 turbocharger
- Total Displacement - 1.8 L (1,834 cc)
- Bore - 81 mm (3.19 in)
- Stroke - 89 mm (3.5 in)
- Compression Ratio - 8.5:1 (Upgraded to 9.1:1 in 1994)
- Maximum Output - 143 kW (195 PS; 192 bhp) at 6,000 rpm (Upgraded to 151 kW (205 PS; 202 bhp) in 1994, and again to 158 kW (215 PS; 212 bhp) in 1995)
- Maximum Torque - 270 N⋅m (199 lb⋅ft) at 3,000 rpm (Upgraded to 275 N⋅m (203 lb⋅ft) in 1994, and again to 284 N⋅m (209 lb⋅ft) in 1995)

4G93 DOHC 16 Valve GDI

- Gasoline Direct Injection (GDI)
- Total Displacement - 1.8 L (1,834 cc)
- Bore - 81 mm (3.19 in)
- Stroke - 89 mm (3.5 in)
- Compression Ratio - 12.0:1
- Maximum Output -
  - Europe: 88 kW (120 PS; 118 bhp) at 5,250 rpm / 90 kW (122 PS; 120 bhp) at 5,500 rpm / 92 kW (125 PS; 123 bhp) at 5,500 rpm
  - Japan: 96 kW (130 PS; 128 bhp) at 5,500 rpm / 96 kW (130 PS; 128 bhp) at 6,000 rpm / 110 kW (150 PS; 148 bhp) at 6,500 rpm
- Maximum Torque -
  - Europe: 174 N⋅m (128 lb⋅ft) @ 3,500 rpm / 174 N⋅m (128 lb⋅ft) @ 3,750 rpm
  - Japan: 181 N⋅m (133 lb⋅ft) @ 3,500 rpm / 177 N⋅m (131 lb⋅ft) @ 3,750 rpm / 178 N⋅m (131 lb⋅ft) @ 5,000 rpm

4G93 DOHC 16 Valve GDI Turbo

- Gasoline Direct Injection (GDI) with turbocharger
- Total Displacement - 1.8 L (1,834 cc)
- Bore - 81 mm (3.19 in)
- Stroke - 89 mm (3.5 in)
- Compression Ratio - 10.0:1
- Maximum Output - 118 kW (160 PS; 158 bhp) @ 5,200 rpm / 121 kW (165 PS; 162 bhp) @ 5,500 rpm
- Maximum Torque - 220 N⋅m (162 lb⋅ft) @ 3,500 rpm / 220 N⋅m (162 lb⋅ft) @ 3,500 rpm

Applications

- Mitsubishi Space Wagon
- Mitsubishi Space Star
- Mitsubishi Carisma
- Mitsubishi Lancer
- Mitsubishi Libero
- Mitsubishi Mirage
- Mitsubishi FTO
- Proton Wira
- Proton Satria
- Proton Putra
- Mitsubishi Colt GTI
- Mitsubishi Galant 1996
- Mitsubishi Pajero iO / Pajero Pinin / Shogun Pinin / Montero iO / Pajero TR4
- Brilliance BC3
- Brilliance BS6
- Brilliance BS4
- Volvo S40/V40

== 4G94 ==
The 4G94 is a 2.0 L (1,999 cc) version built in Japan, used in the Mitsubishi Lancer. It has a cast iron engine block with Multi-point fuel injection and an aluminum SOHC cylinder head with forged steel connecting rods and four valves per cylinder. The 4G94 also comes in the GDI DOHC variant which can be found in the Mitsubishi Galant.

4G94 SOHC 16 Valve MPI

- Multi-Point Injection (MPI)
- Total Displacement - 2.0 L (1,999 cc)
- Bore - 81.5 mm (3.21 in)
- Stroke - 95.8 mm (3.77 in)
- Compression Ratio - 9.5:1
- Maximum Output - 92 kW (125 PS; 123 bhp) @ 5,200 rpm
- Maximum Torque - 176 N⋅m (130 lb⋅ft) @ 4,250 rpm

4G94 DOHC 16 Valve GDI

- Gasoline Direct Injection (GDI)
- Bore - 81.5 mm (3.21 in)
- Stroke - 95.8 mm (3.77 in)
- Compression Ratio: 11.0:1
- Maximum Output: 107 kW (145 PS; 143 bhp) / 5,700 rpm
- Maximum Torque: 19.5 kg⋅m (191 N⋅m; 141 lb⋅ft) / 3,750 rpm

Applications

Applications

- Mitsubishi Pajero iO / Pajero Pinin / Shogun Pinin / Montero iO / Pajero TR4
- Mitsubishi Adventure/Mitsubishi Kuda/Mitsubishi Freeca/Soueast Freeca
- Mitsubishi Lancer
- Mitsubishi Galant
- Hyundai Santa Fe
- Hawtai Lusheng E70

== See also ==
- List of Mitsubishi engines
