= Z8 =

Z8 or Z-8 or variation, may refer to:

== Computing and electronics ==
- Motorola RIZR Z8, a smartphone
- Zilog Z8, a microprocessor
- .z8, a Z-machine interpreter file extension
- Nikon Z8, a full-frame mirrorless camera produced by Nikon

== Places ==
- Ofu Airport (FAA airport code Z08), Ofu, American Samoa
- Ōtemachi Station (Tokyo) (station code Z08), Chiyoda, Tokyo, Japan
- Telescope Live (observatory code Z08), Oria, Spain; see List of observatory codes

== Vehicles ==
- BMW Z8, an automobile
- Changhe Z-8, a Chinese transport helicopter, license produced Aérospatiale Super Frelon
- Zotye Z8, a crossover automobile

== Other uses ==
- Línea Aérea Amaszonas (IATA airline code Z8)
- Z08, a fictional character from Young Justice; see List of Young Justice characters
- Saxo-rama (album code Z-08), an album by Elie Apper

== See also ==
- 8Z (disambiguation)
