= Zotye T800 =

Chinese automobile

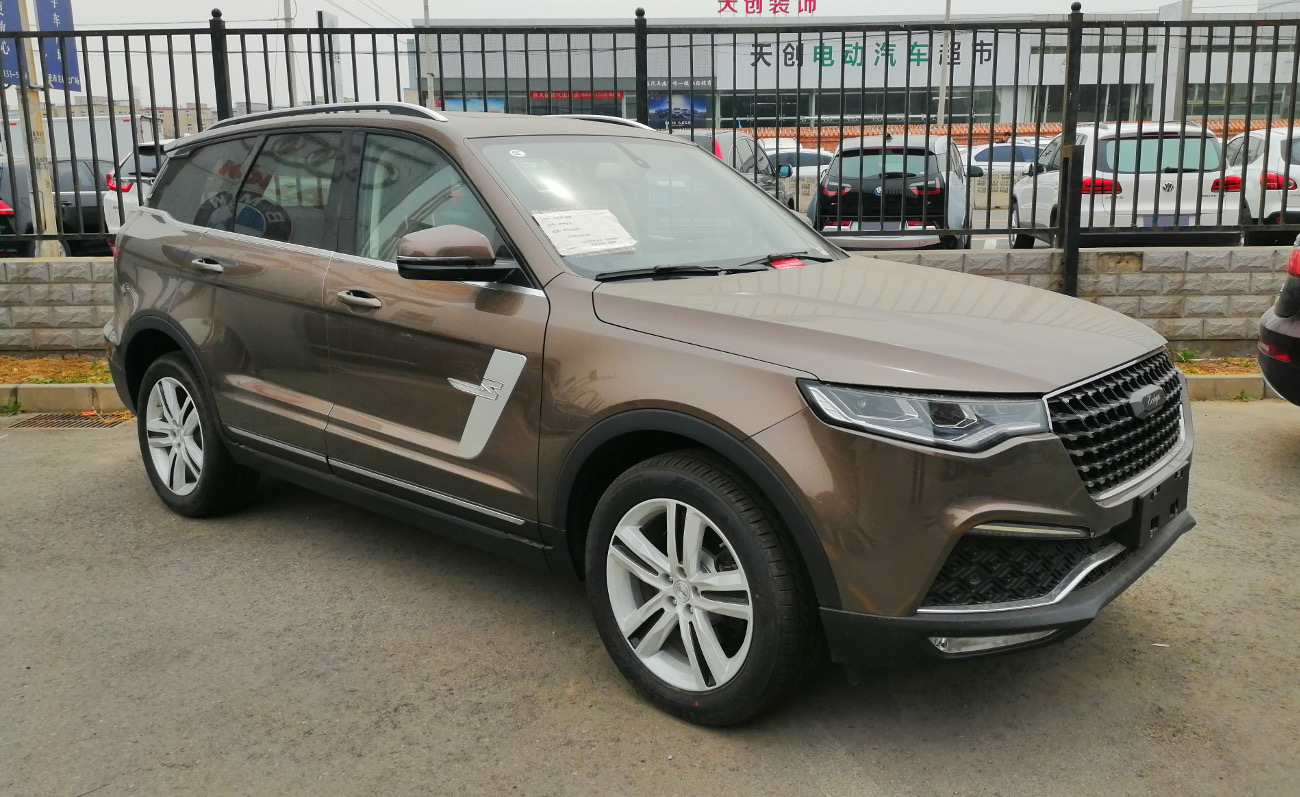

Overview
- Manufacturer: Zotye
- Production: 2018–2021
- Assembly: China

Body and chassis
- Class: Mid-size CUV
- Body style: 5-door CUV
- Layout: Front-engine, front-wheel-drive Front-engine, four-wheel-drive
- Related: Zotye T700

Powertrain
- Engine: 2.0 L 4G63 I4 turbo (petrol)
- Transmission: 6-speed DCT

Dimensions
- Wheelbase: 2,850 mm (112.2 in)
- Length: 4,910 mm (193.3 in)
- Width: 1,933 mm (76.1 in)
- Height: 1,755 mm (69.1 in)

The Zotye T800 was a mid-size CUV by Zotye, and it is the 7-seater version of the Zotye T700 mid-size crossover produced by Zotye, sharing everything before the C-pillars.

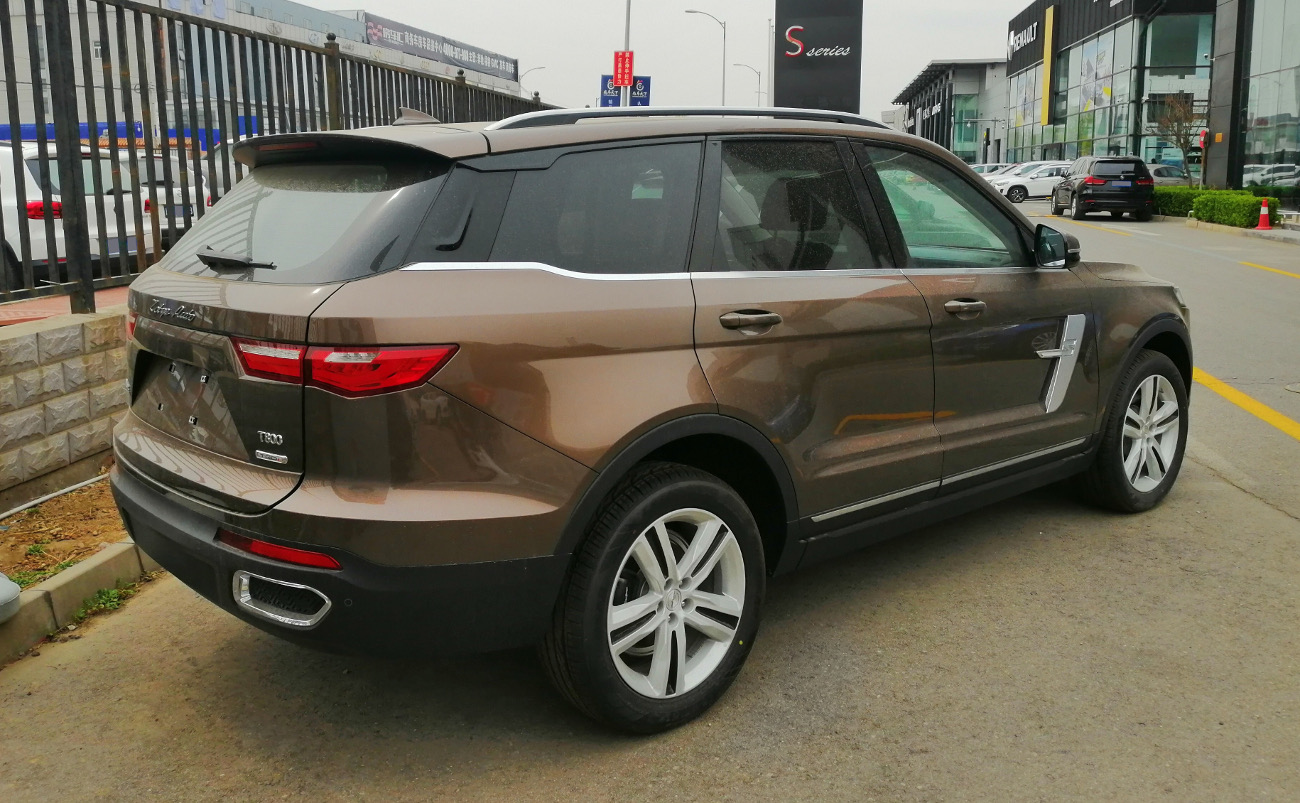
Zotye T800 rear

== Overview ==
Pricing of the Zotye T800 ranges from 131,800 to 185,800 yuan. In Vietnam, it is on sale as the 7-seater version of Zotye Z8.

== Similarities with Zotye T700 ==
Like its brother - the T700, Zotye T800 appears with a Range Rover-like design and a front grille that heavily resembles the Maserati Levante. Both T700 and T800 use the 4G63 turbo engine from Mitsubishi mated to a 6-speed dual-clutch transmission.
