= 8Z =

8Z or 8-Z may refer to:

- 8Z, IATA code for Venezuelan airline LASER Airlines
- 8Z, IATA code for Wizz Air Bulgaria
- 8Z, former IATA code for Albatros Airlines
- South African Class 8Z 2-8-0 locomotive
- Typ 8Z, internal designation for Audi A2
- R4D-8Z, a model of Douglas C-47 Skytrain

== See also ==
- Z8 (disambiguation)
