= Zotye T700 =

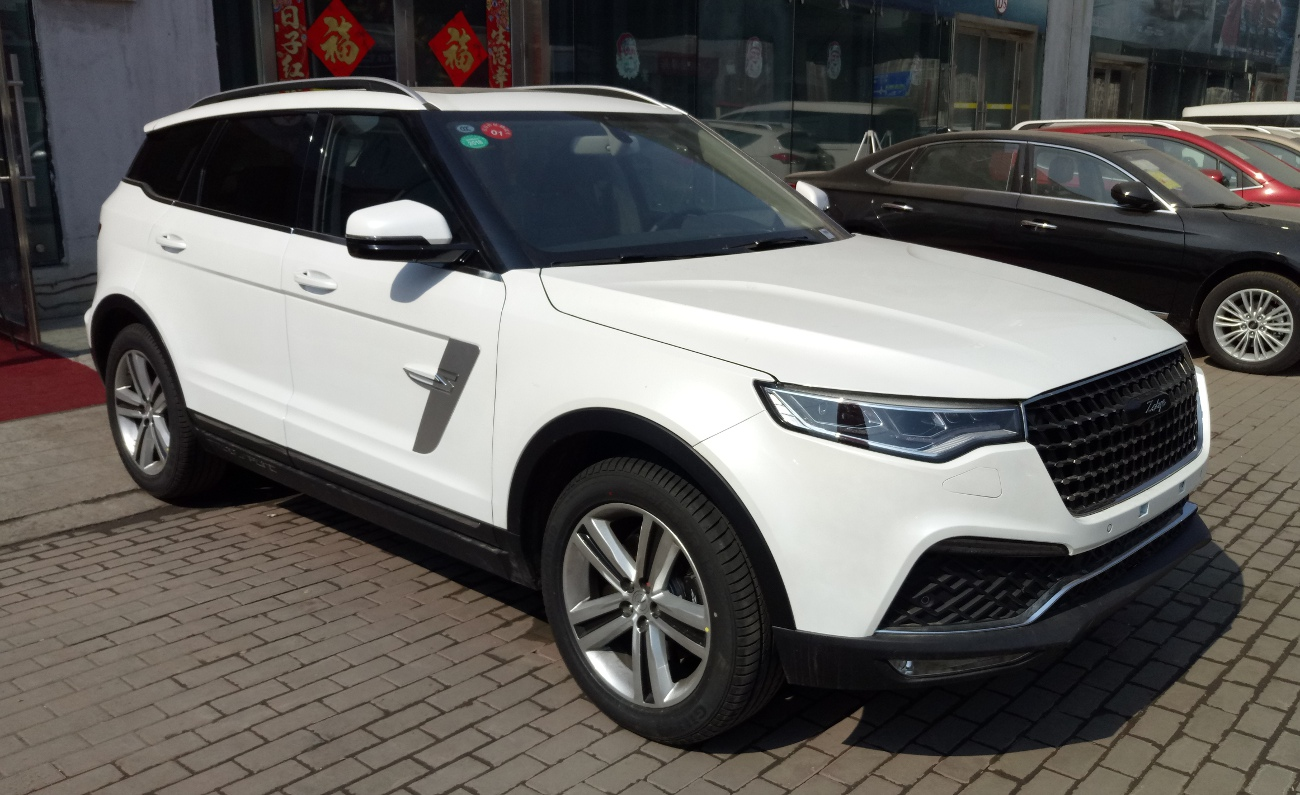

Overview
- Manufacturer: Zotye
- Also called: Zoyte Z8
- Production: 2017–2021
- Assembly: China

Body and chassis
- Class: Mid-size crossover SUV
- Body style: 5-door SUV
- Layout: Front-engine, front-wheel-drive Front-engine, four-wheel-drive
- Related: Zotye T800

Powertrain
- Engine: Petrol: 1.8 L 4G18 I4 turbo; 2.0 L 4G63 I4 turbo
- Transmission: 5-speed manual; 6-speed DCT; 8-speed automatic

Dimensions
- Wheelbase: 2,850 mm (112.2 in)
- Length: 4,748 mm (186.9 in)
- Width: 1,933 mm (76.1 in)
- Height: 1,697 mm (66.8 in)
- Curb weight: 1,740–1,810 kg (3,836–3,990 lb)

The Zotye T700 is a mid-size crossover SUV which produced by Zotye.

== Overview ==
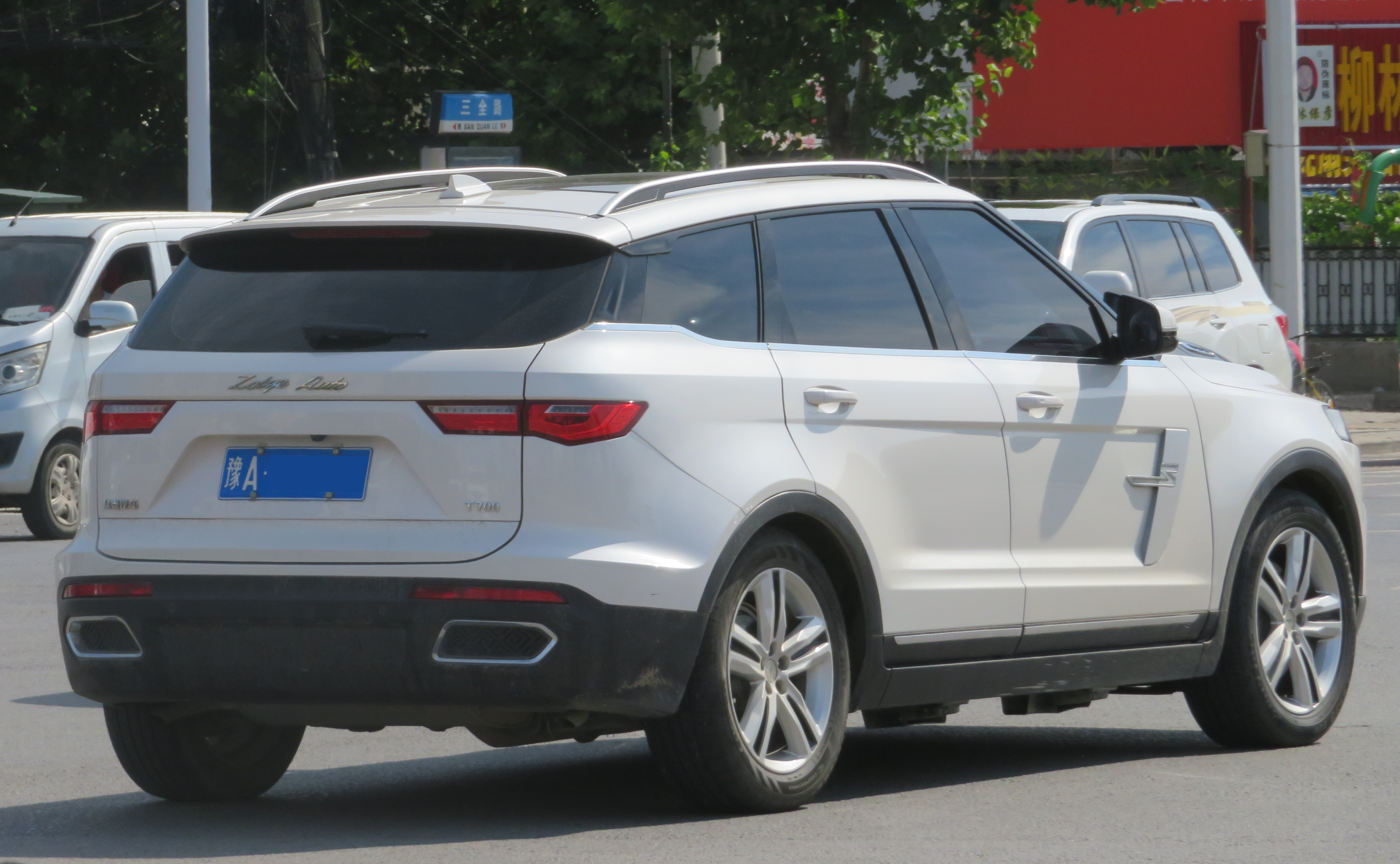
Zotye T700 rear

Revealed in 2016, the Zotye T700 is the production version of the Zotye T600 S concept from the 2015 Shanghai Auto Show. Slightly larger and positioned above the Zotye T600, the Zotye T700 is still a mid-size CUV. Pricing of the Zotye T700 ranges from 106,800 to 155,800 yuan. Not only powered by 4G18 turbo engine and 4G63 turbo engine from Mitsubishi, it was told to have 6-speed dual-clutch transmission from German gearbox manufacturer ZF Friedrichshafen.

The Zotye T700 name was used during the development phase of the Zotye SR9. However, the name was dropped soon after and switched to Zotye SR8 before immediately changing to Zotye SR9. In Vietnam, it is on sale as the Zotye Z8, with the same engine and gearbox options.

== Safety functions ==
In China, the T700 passed the C-NCAP crash test with a rating of five stars. The car is equipped with other safety functions such as anti-lock braking system (ABS) and electronic brakeforce distribution (EBD). The electronic stability control (ESC) is also a standard safety feature of this affordable-luxury SUV.

== Controversies ==
During development, the T700 was criticized to have an exterior design imitating Range Rover Evoque and Maserati Levante. The interior of T700 is also have rising debates for copying both Land Rover and Porsche's interior design. Moreover, the GPS system of the T700 is also a controversy for showing the illegal nine-dash line of China on the East Sea.
