= Zotye Auto =

Chinese motor company

Zotye International Automobile Trading Co., Ltd.

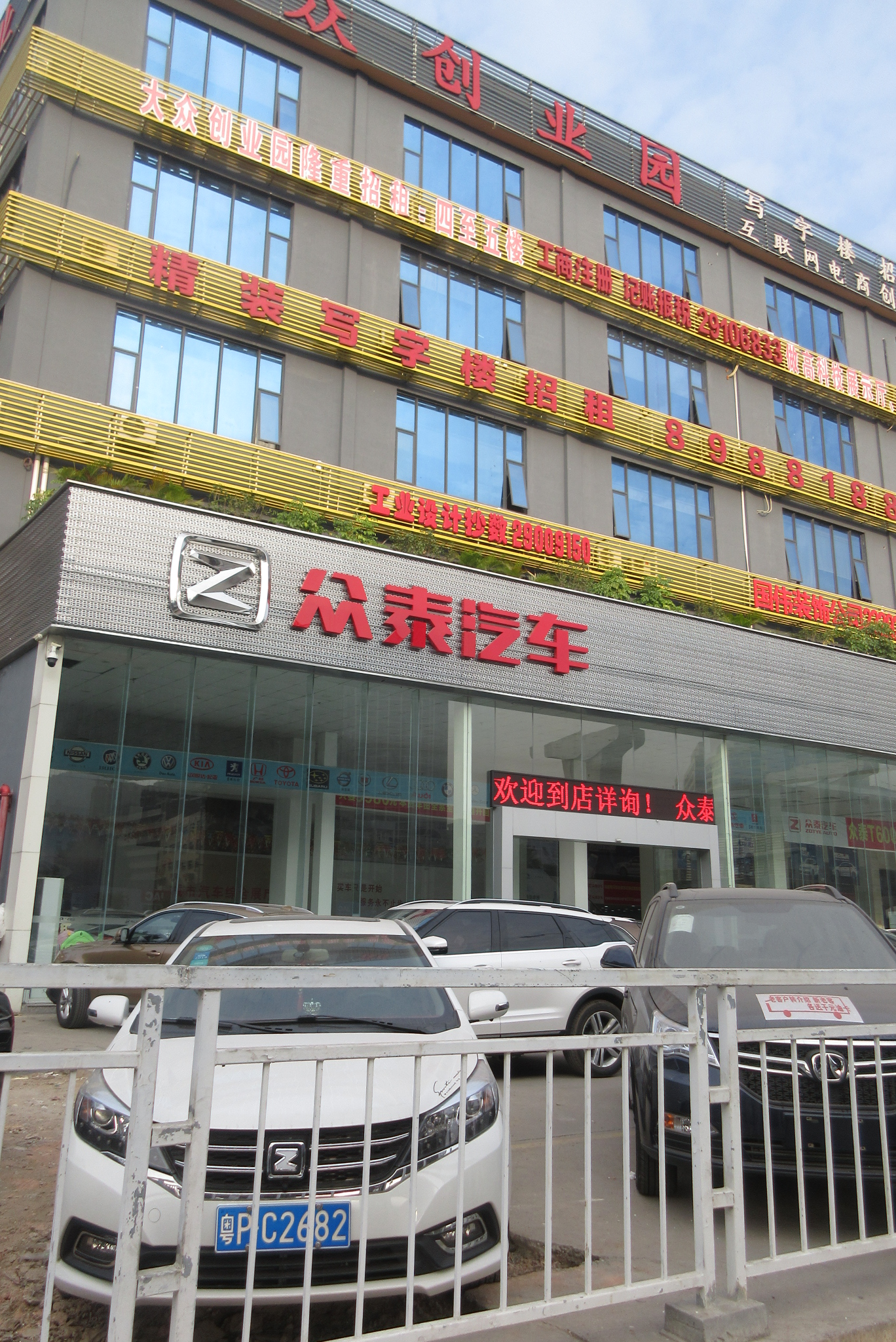
- Zotye headquarters in Shenzhen, China
- Type: Private
- Industry: Automotive
- Founded: 14 January 2005; 21 years ago
- Founder: Ying Jianren (应建仁)
- Headquarters: Yongkang, Zhejiang, China
- Key people: Hu Zeyu (Chairman)
- Products: Automobiles
- Parent: Zotye Holding Group
- Website: zotye.com

Zotye Auto (Chinese: 众泰汽车; pinyin: Zhòngtài Qìchē; officially Zotye International Automobile Trading Co., Ltd.) is a privately owned Chinese automobile manufacturer based in Yongkang, Zhejiang, China. It is owned by Zotye Holding Group and was established in 2005. The company is known for its copycat cars, which gained popularity in China's rural areas and third and fourth tier cities during the late 2010s.

== History ==
Zotye Auto was founded in 2005 by the Zotye Holding Group. Previously, Zotye had contracts to only export automotive parts, but increased its production to complete cars to take advantage of the expanding Chinese automotive market. In 2005, because of their reputation as a reliable partner, Zotye established contracts for sales subsidiaries in 10 different countries. Since 2005, Zotye has expanded its automobile lineup and production numbers. The first model of the brand was a small SUV, the Zotye RX6400, later renamed as the Zotye Nomad. The Nomad bears a resemblance to the Daihatsu Terios.

Zotye's total revenues in 2006 were 2.88 billion RMB (about €290 million). Zotye Auto ranked 352nd with a revenue of 20.80 billion RMB and a profit of 1.13 billion RMB on Top 500 Chinese Companies List released by Fortune China on July 10, 2018.

After 2020, sales rapidly dropped, and the company entered bankruptcy and liquidation proceedings in 2021. Its cessation followed complex financial issues caused by consequently worsening debt. Commentators noted that Zotye still relied on internal combustion engines from Mitsubishi at a time when competitors developed their own engines or electrified drivetrains. Production was reportedly restarted in December 2022.

In March 2023, the company's domicile was changed from the Economic Development Zone, She County, Huangshan City, Anhui Province to No. 1 Beihu Road, Economic Development Zone, Yongkang City, Jinhua City, Zhejiang Province. In July 2024 Zotye announced agreements to expand markets in Russia and Algeria.

In 2024, the company reported a 1 billion RMB loss on 558 million RMB revenue. In June 2025, Zotye reported being unable to continue vehicle production due to liquidity problems.

On September 9th 2026, Zotye Auto announced the Wink Y01 international version, being based on the previous Jiangnan U2 from Jiangnan Automobile, a company owned by Zotye, the design of the V01 is identical to the Qingcheng Shidai VC or Ruixiang Hoen O2, and is targeted towards international markets instead of the Chinese domestic market.

== Leadership ==
- Wu Jianzhong (2005–2018)
- Jin Zheyong (2018–2022)
- Huang Jihong (2022)
- Ye Changqing (2022–2023)
- Hu Zeyu (Ryan Hu) (2023–present)

== Former models ==
=== Series E ===
==== E20 EV ====
The E20 EV is a small electric car produced by Zhidou Auto for Zotye.

==== E30 EV ====
The E30 EV is a small electric car that looks very much like the older version of the Smart Fortwo. Launched at the 2015 Shanghai Auto Show, its body shares the look of the Smart's individually painted Tridion safety cell and wheel-in-each-corner layout. It has a 1765 mm wheelbase, and measures 2798 mm long, 1563 mm wide, and 1572 mm tall - smaller than the equivalent Smart Car. The central console is reported as having been inspired by the Tesla Model S, with a large touch screen. The electric drive is built around a 17.6 kWh battery and an electric motor that provides up to 18 kW of power and 83 NM of torque. Zotye claim that the E30 has a top speed exceeding 80 km/h and a driving range of 150 km. In 2016 the company reported sales of just 3,471 units.

==== E200 EV ====
The E20 EV is an even smaller electric car that also looks a bit like the older version of the Smart Fortwo. Also launched in 2015 in Shanghai its electric drive is built around a lithium-ion battery and an electric motor that provides up to 82 NM of torque. Zotye claim that the E200 has a top speed exceeding 80 km/h and a driving range of 120 km. In 2016 the company reported sales of 13,154 units.

==== E300 EV ====
The E300 is a multi purpose vehicle based on the Fiat Multipla but using an electric power train instead of the petrol engined M300. The E300 MPV has 6 seats 5 doors and the floor pan of the Fiat Bravo.

=== JN Auto/TT ===
In 2009, Zotye purchased Jiangnan Auto and acquired their only production model, a facelifted Suzuki Alto which was initially sold as the JN Auto. In late 2010, Zotye released a $2,830 Jiangnan Alto, the cheapest car in China and possibly in the world, and now calls the car Zotye TT.

=== 2008/5008 ===
In 2008, Zotye began exporting the Zotye Nomad, the export name for the 2008 which was launched in China in 2006 as a rebadged Daihatsu Terios. In 2010, Zotye released the Zotye 5008 which is a facelifted Zotye 2008 for the Chinese domestic market. It is still sold as the "Nomad" but also as the Zotye Hunter in various export markers, and also in India as the Premier Rio. Together with LUIS Motors GmbH, Zotye has developed an electric version of the Zotye 5008 for the European market, where it is sold as the "Luis 4U". Zoyte also supplies CKD kits of Nomad to Premier Limited in India to sell a version of this car as Premier Rio, powered by a Peugeot TUD5 diesel engine. Nomads are also sold in South Africa and Latin America. Following a new restyling, it is now marketed as the Zotye T200.

Zotye has an ambitious plan for developing electric cars. It started leasing 5008EVs in Hangzhou in 2010. Production ended in 2013.

=== M300 ===
In 2009, Zotye released its second car model for the Chinese market, Zotye M300, (originally Multipla) which is a licensed rebadged production of the Fiat Multipla. Production ended in 2013.

=== T200 ===
The T200 is the facelifted version of the Zotye 5008, adding also a new interior design. It was launched in April 2013, and is powered by a range of a 1.3-litre and a 1.5-litre petrol engines, with four valves per cylinder and variable valve timing, reportedly sourced from Mitsubishi, which are able to develop between 92 and 115 hp (69 and 86 kW) and between 113 and 134 N⋅m (83 and 99 lb⋅ft) of torque. Production ended in 2016.

=== Series Z ===
==== Z100 ====
At the 2013 Shanghai Auto Show, Zotye introduced their new Z100 model, a five-door hatchback city car, with a design very much inspired from the seventh generation Suzuki Alto. The model was initially revealed one year before as the New Jiangnan TT. It is one of the cheapest cars on the Chinese market.

==== Z200/ Z200HB ====
The Zotye Z200 and Z200HB are subcompact sedans and hatchback based on the Fiat Siena and Palio respectively. Fiat sold the Siena and Palio platforms to Zotye in 2008. Initial names of the Z200 and Z200HB are Langjun and Langjie respectively, but the products were later renamed to fit into the new Zotye product line.

Zotye launched the Z200 saloon and Z200HB hatchback in 2011, an updated version of the Fiat Palio and Siena which had been built in China by Nanjing Fiat from 2001 to 2006 with little success, and Zotye purchased the tooling for these cars in 2008. The Z200 stopped production in 2014.

==== Z300/ Z360 ====
The Z300 four-door compact saloon was launched in 2012. It has a remarkable likeness to the design of the second generation (2007) Toyota Allion. The facelift version was later renamed to Z360.

==== Z500/ Z560 ====
The Z500 is a 4-door sedan that was produced since November 2014. It runs on a 1.5-litre 4G15 or 4A91 engine. Transmission choices are a 5-speed manual or a CVT gearbox. The facelift version was renamed to z560.

==== Z700 ====
The Z700 (formerly known as the Z600) is a sedan produced by Zotye Auto since 2016 positioned above the Z500. It runs on a 1.8-litre turbo or 2.0-litre turbo engine paired with a 6-speed dual-clutch gearbox. Pricing is 99,800 yuan to 158,800 yuan.

=== Series T ===
==== T300 ====
The T300 is a Subcompact crossover with styling inspired by the Mazda CX-3.

==== T500 ====
The T500 is a Compact crossover revealed during the 2017 Shanghai Auto Show and launched in March 2018.

==== T600 ====
The T600 is a mid-size crossover launched in December 2013, powered by either a 1.5-litre turbo or a 2.0-litre turbo petrol engine. According to much of the media, it has a remarkable resemblance to the Audi Q5 and the Volkswagen Touareg. A higher trim model with completely redesigned front DRG and rear bumper called the Zotye T600 Sport was revealed in May 2016. Another higher trim model featuring redesigned DLO and D pillars called the Zotye T600 Coupe was revealed in March 2017.

==== T700 ====
Previewed by the T600 S Concept launched on the 2015 Shanghai Auto Show, the T700 has been the flagship SUV of the Zotye brand ever since. It was one of the first original designs coming out of Zotye despite the ongoing copying controversies of other products. Production commenced in May 2017. The T700 is marketed as Zotye Z8 in Vietnamese market.

==== T800 ====
Based on the T700, the Zotye T800 is a full-size SUV revealed during the 2018 Beijing Auto Show essentially being a longer version of the T700.

=== Traum ===
Traum is a sub-brand under Zotye Auto. This brand name means "dream" in German. The Traum brand was originally aimed at a younger target market.

The Chinese name was pronounced as Junma (君马), and is best translated as Supreme Horse. The English slogan is Driven by Dreams. The Chinese slogan is Dream for a Horse.

Cars branded under the Traum marque are manufactured by the former Jiangnan Auto, a subsidiary bought by Zotye that was famous for building China's cheapest car; the Jiangnan TT.

==== Traum S70 ====
The Traum S70 is a mid-size crossover utility vehicle introduced in 2017.

==== Traum MEET3 ====
The Traum MEET3 is a compact crossover utility vehicle based on the Zotye SR7 introduced in 2017. It resembles the first generation Mercedes-Benz GLA-Class.

==== Traum MEET5 ====
The Traum MEET5 is a compact crossover utility vehicle inspired by the Mazda CX-4.

==== Traum SEEK5 ====
The Traum SEEK5 is a mid-size crossover utility vehicle introduced in 2018.

=== Other series ===
==== SR7 ====
The SR7 is a compact crossover of the Zotye brand. It bears striking resemblance to the Audi Q3.

==== SR9 ====
The SR9 is a mid-size crossover of the Zotye brand. It bears striking resemblance to the Porsche Macan.

==== Domy X5 ====
The Domy X5 or Damai X5 is a compact crossover of the Zotye brand. It bears striking resemblance to the first generation Volkswagen Tiguan.

==== Domy X7 ====
The Domy X7 or Damai X7 is a mid-size crossover of the Zotye brand. It bears striking resemblance to the 2015 Volkswagen Cross Coupe GTE Concept and 2018 Volkswagen Atlas Cross Sport Concept.

==== V10 ====
The small Japanese style minivan was launched in 2011. It runs on a 4G12 engine and 5 speed manual gearbox.

== Product gallery ==
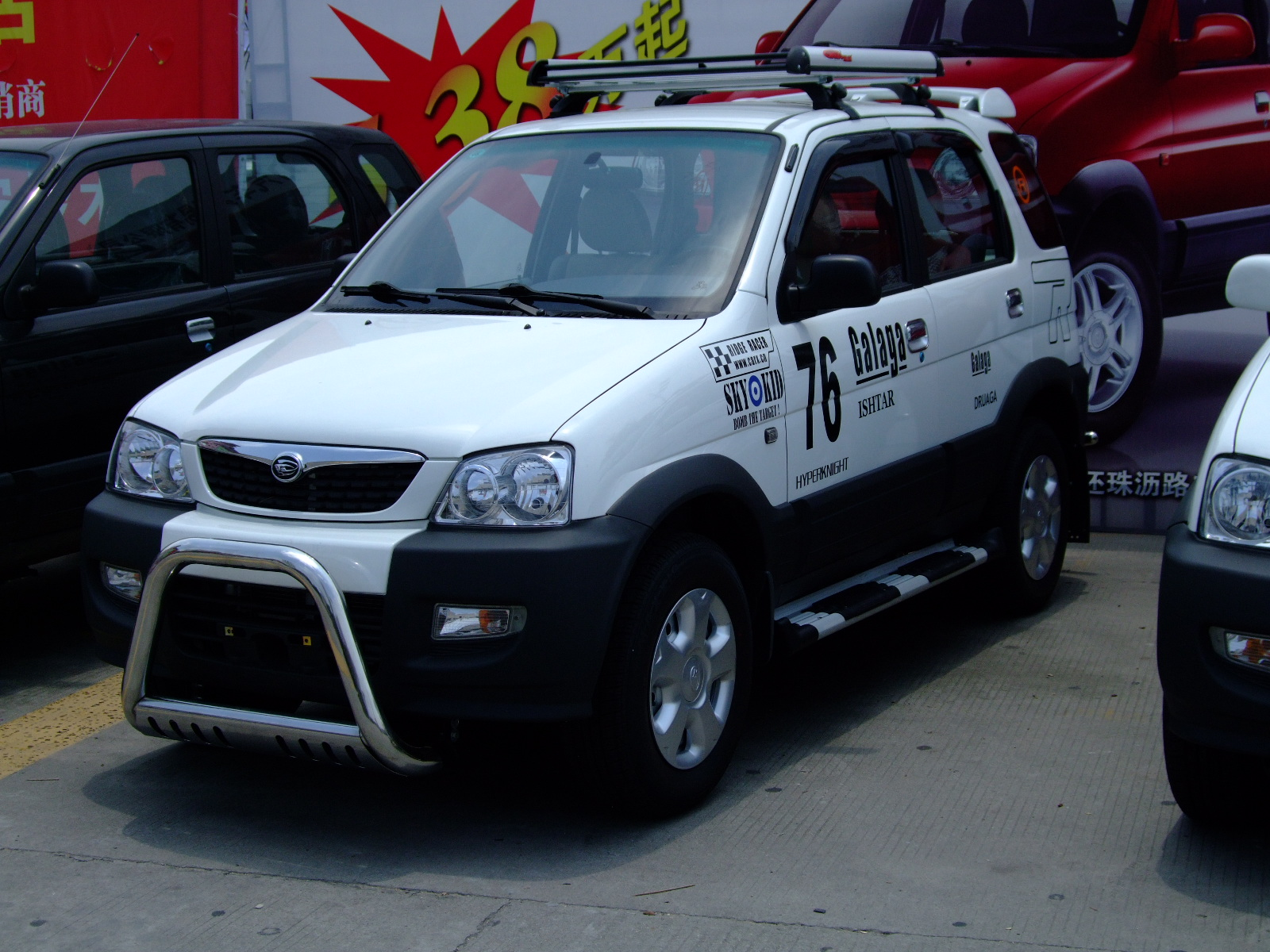
Zotye 2008

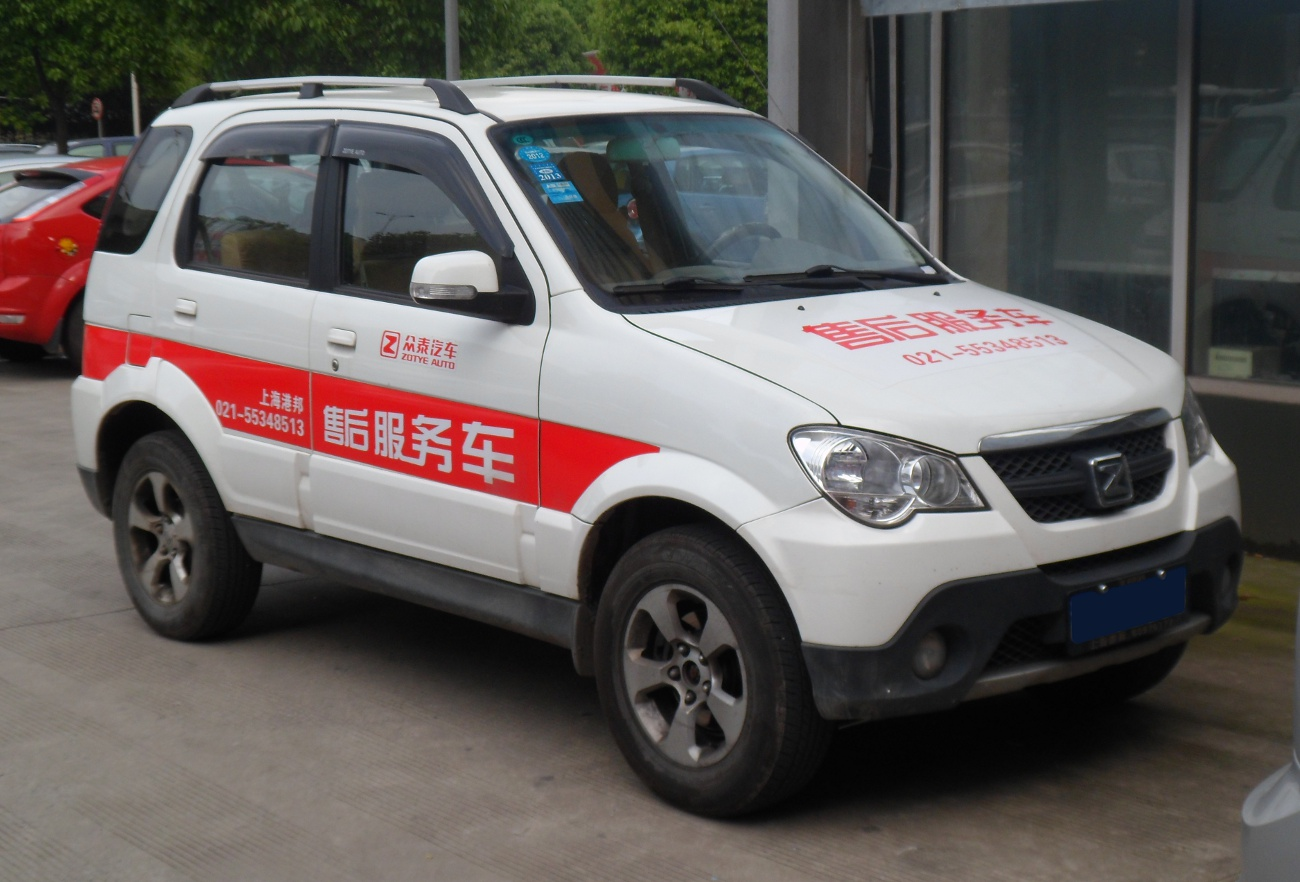
Zotye 5008

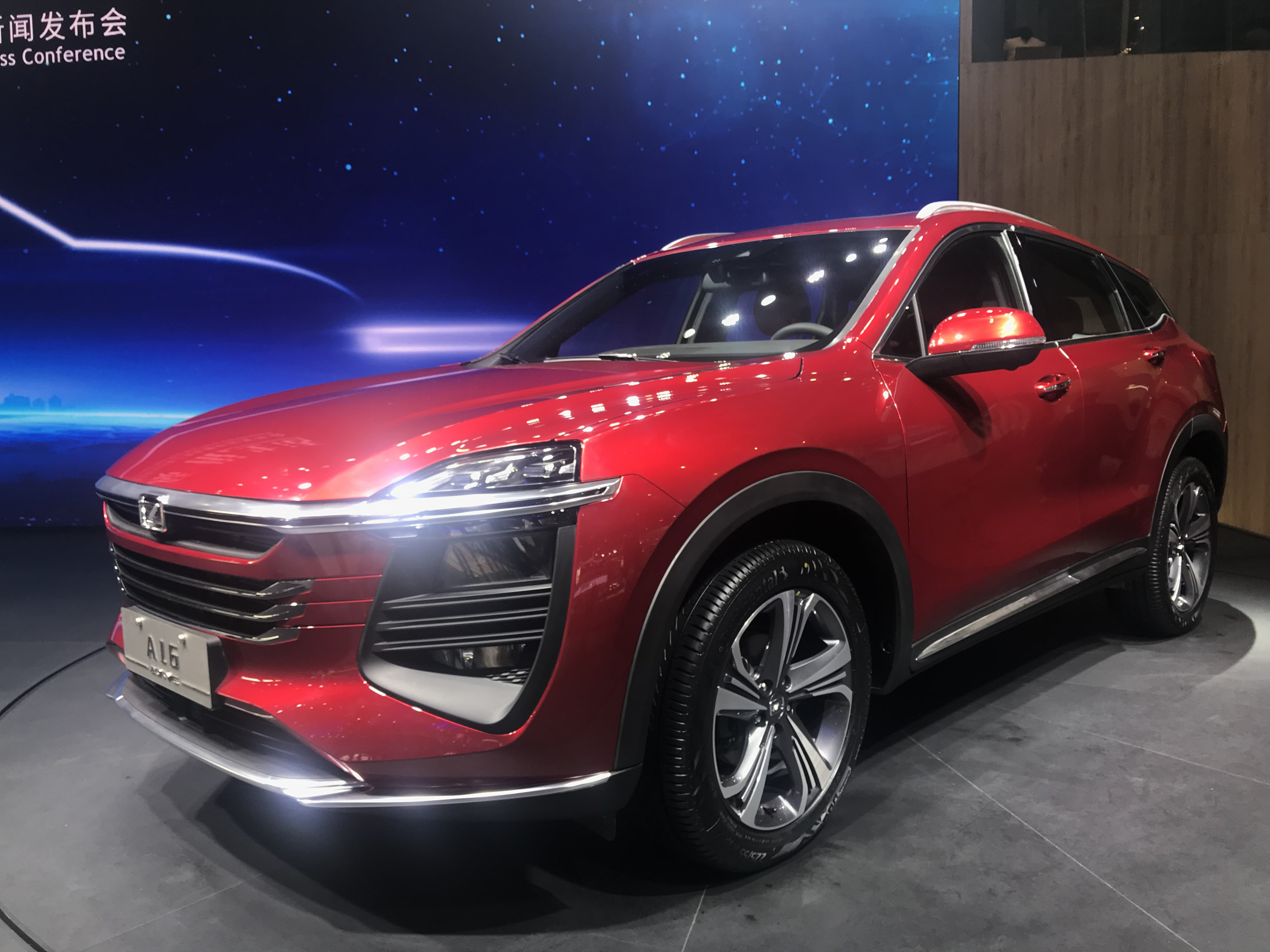
Zotye A16

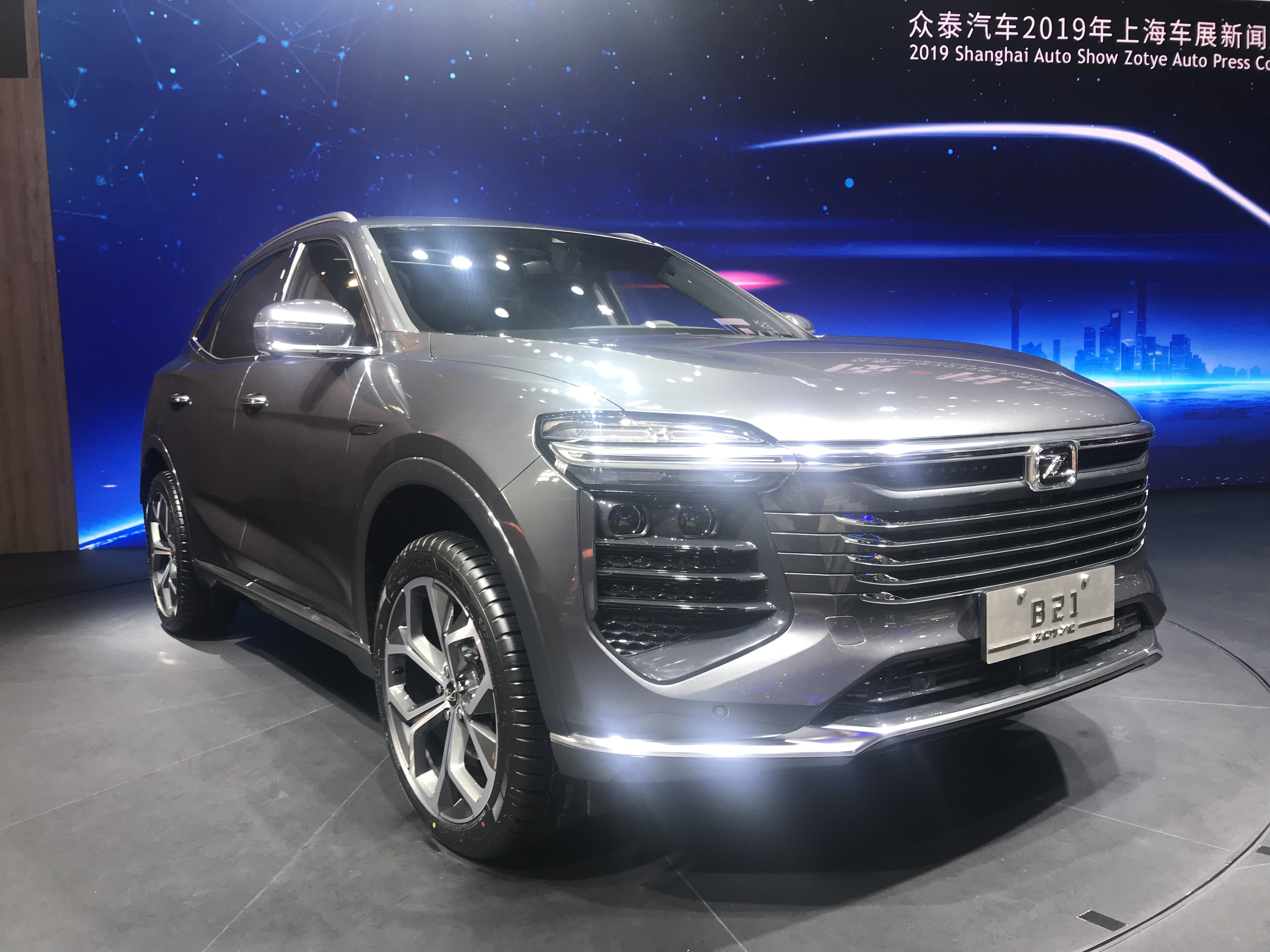
Zotye B21

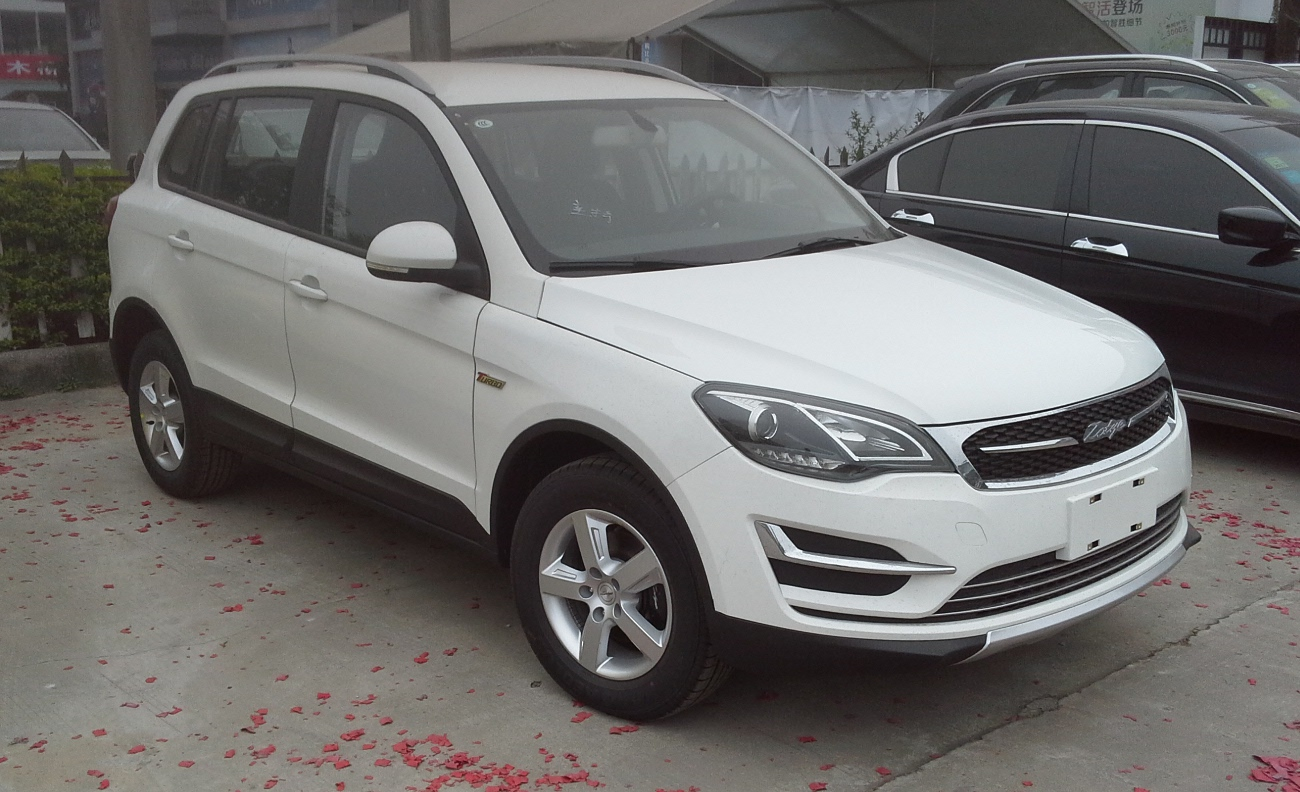
Zotye Domy X5

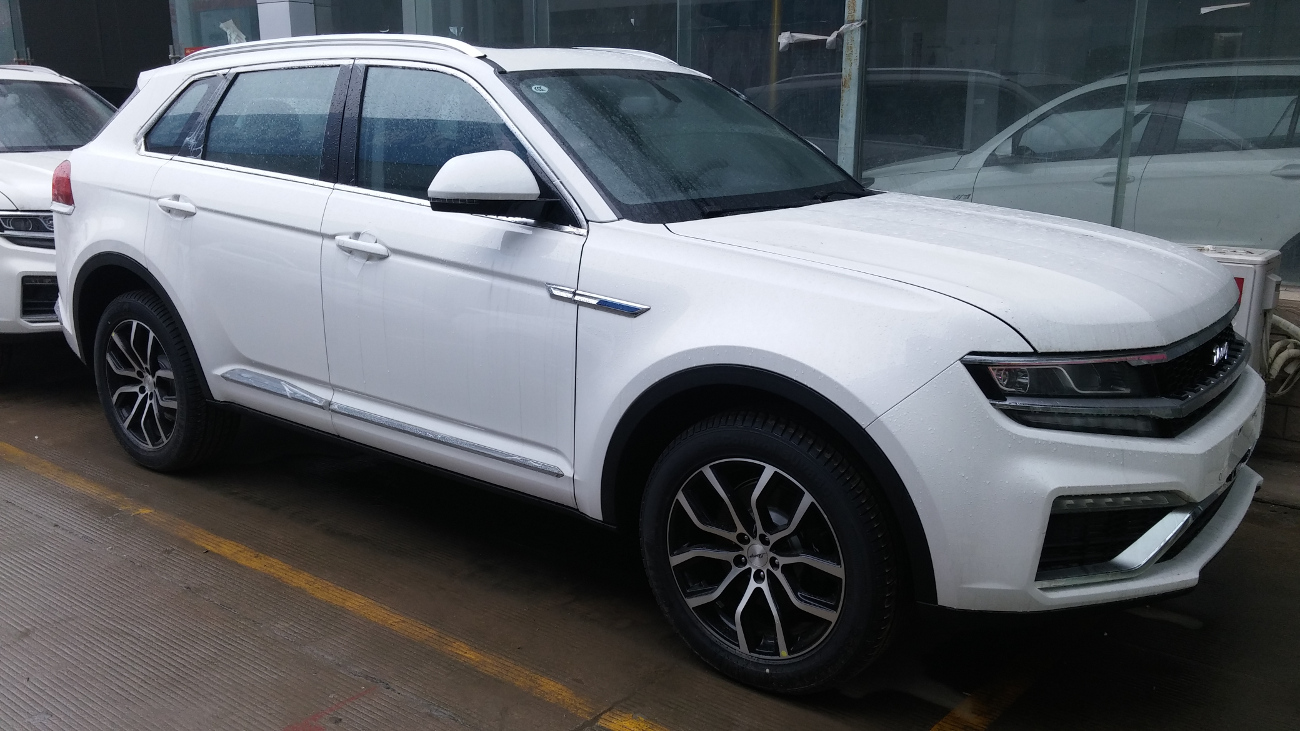
Zotye Domy X7

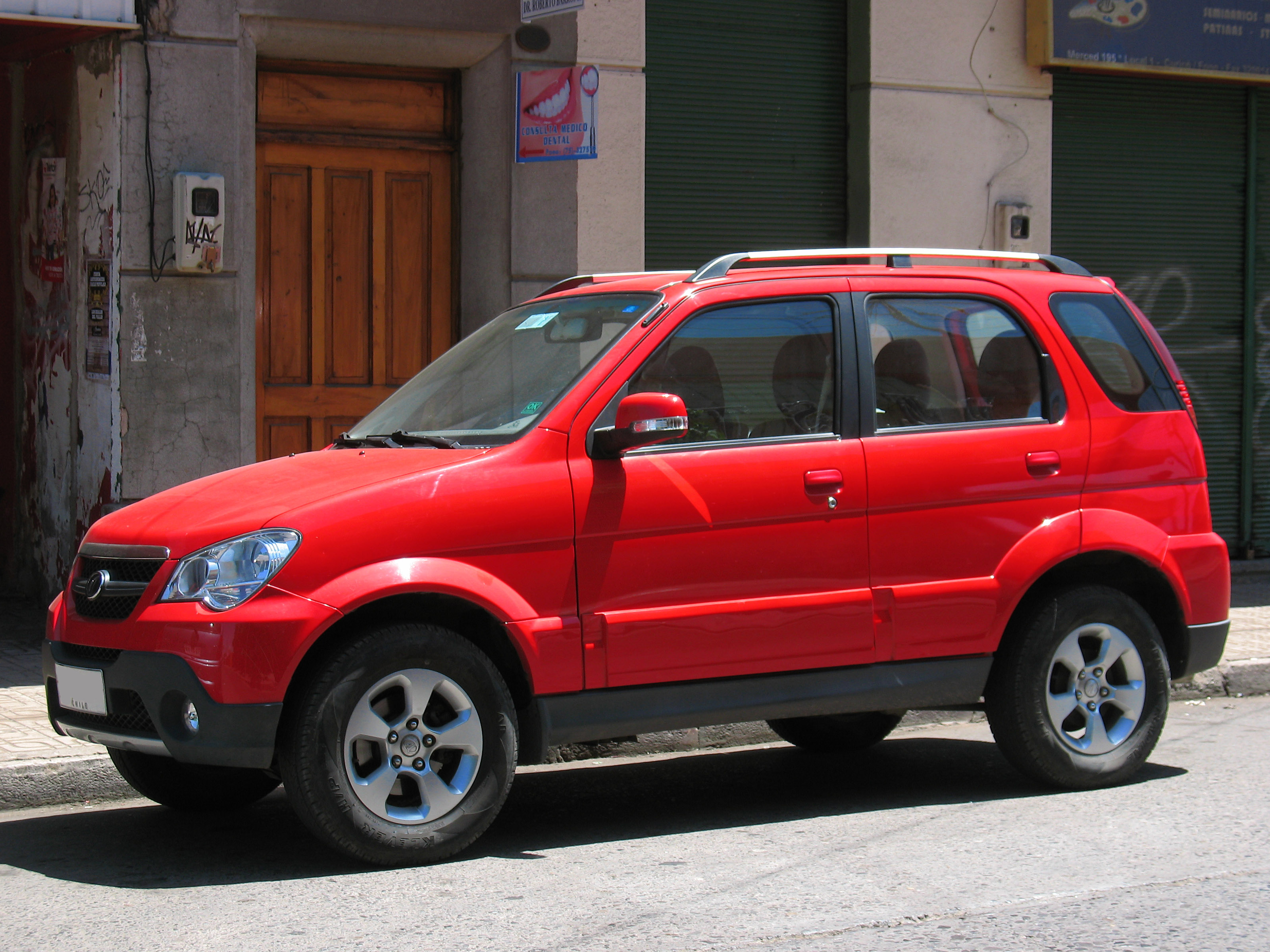
Zotye Hunter

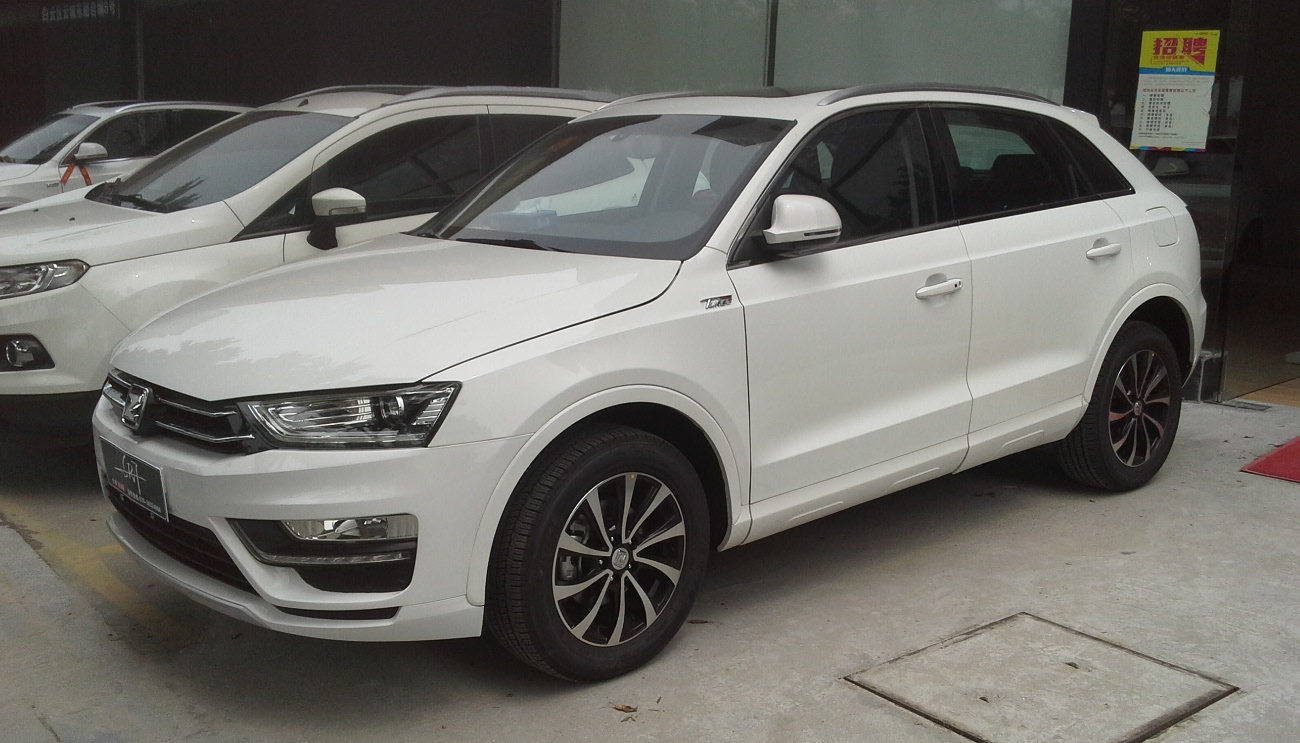
Zotye SR7

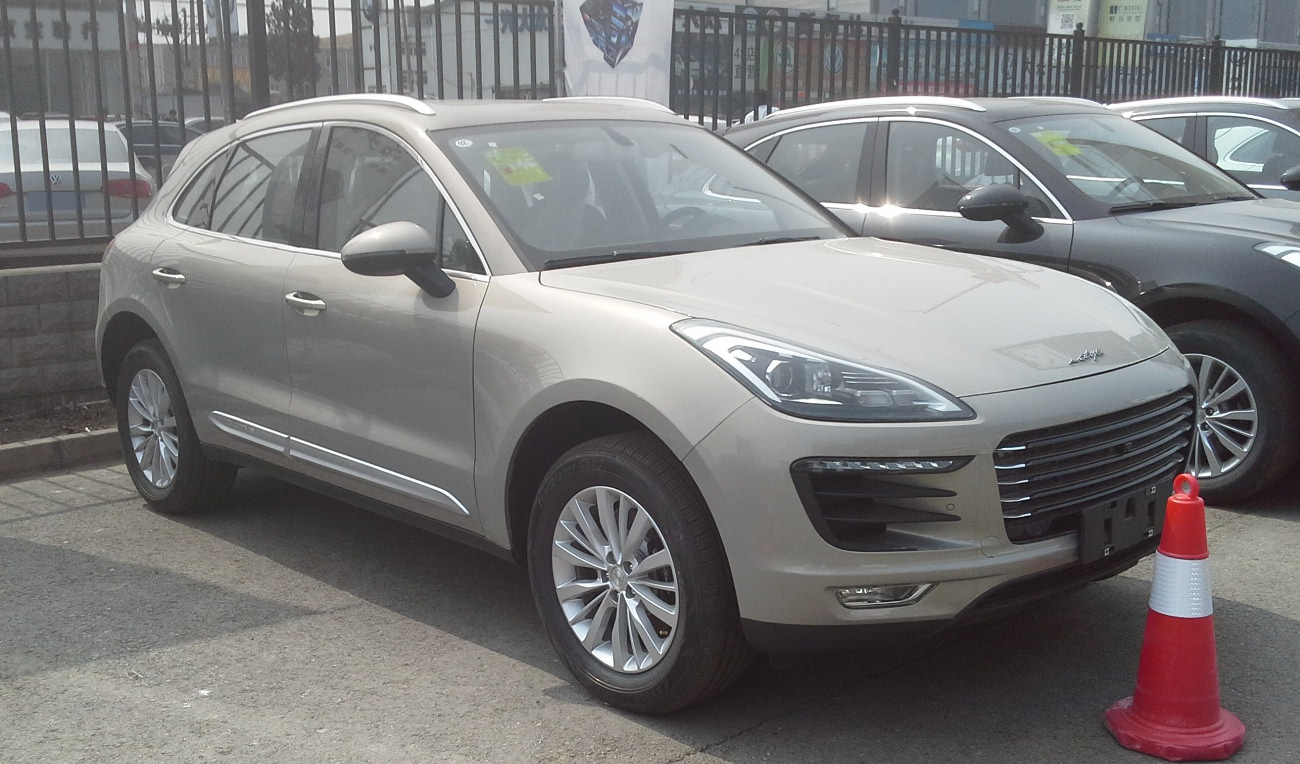
Zotye SR9

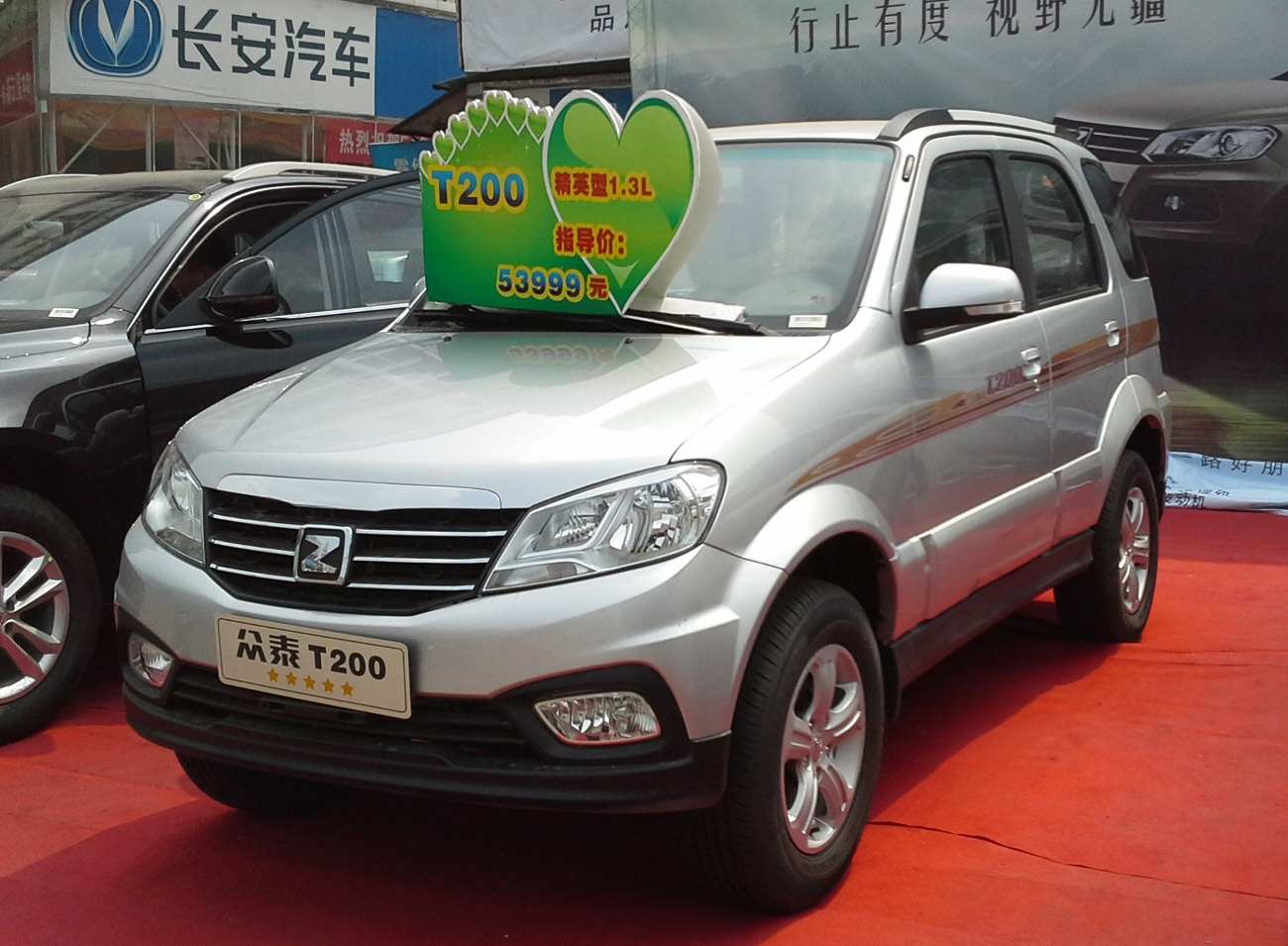
Zotye T200

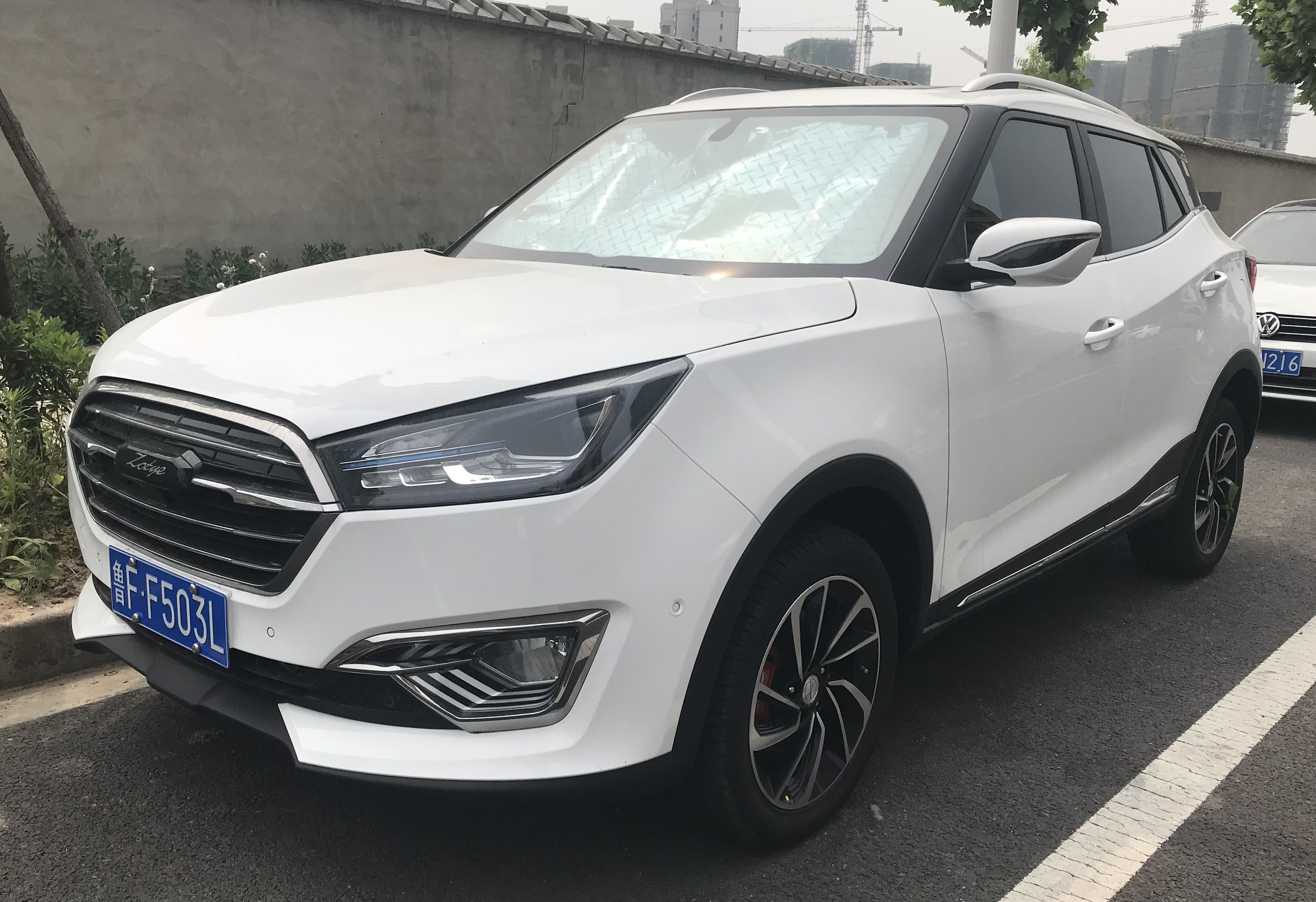
Zotye T300

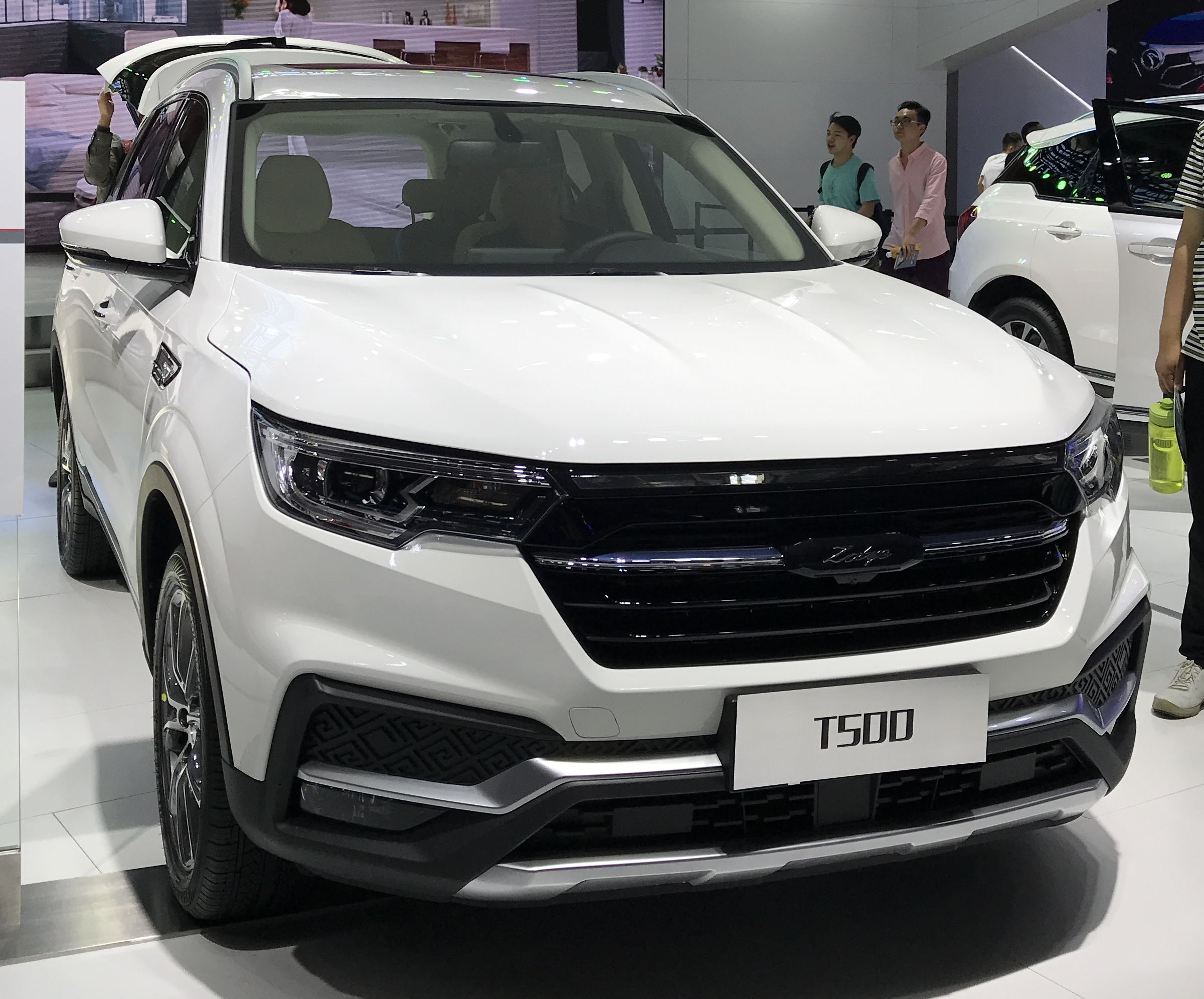
Zotye T500

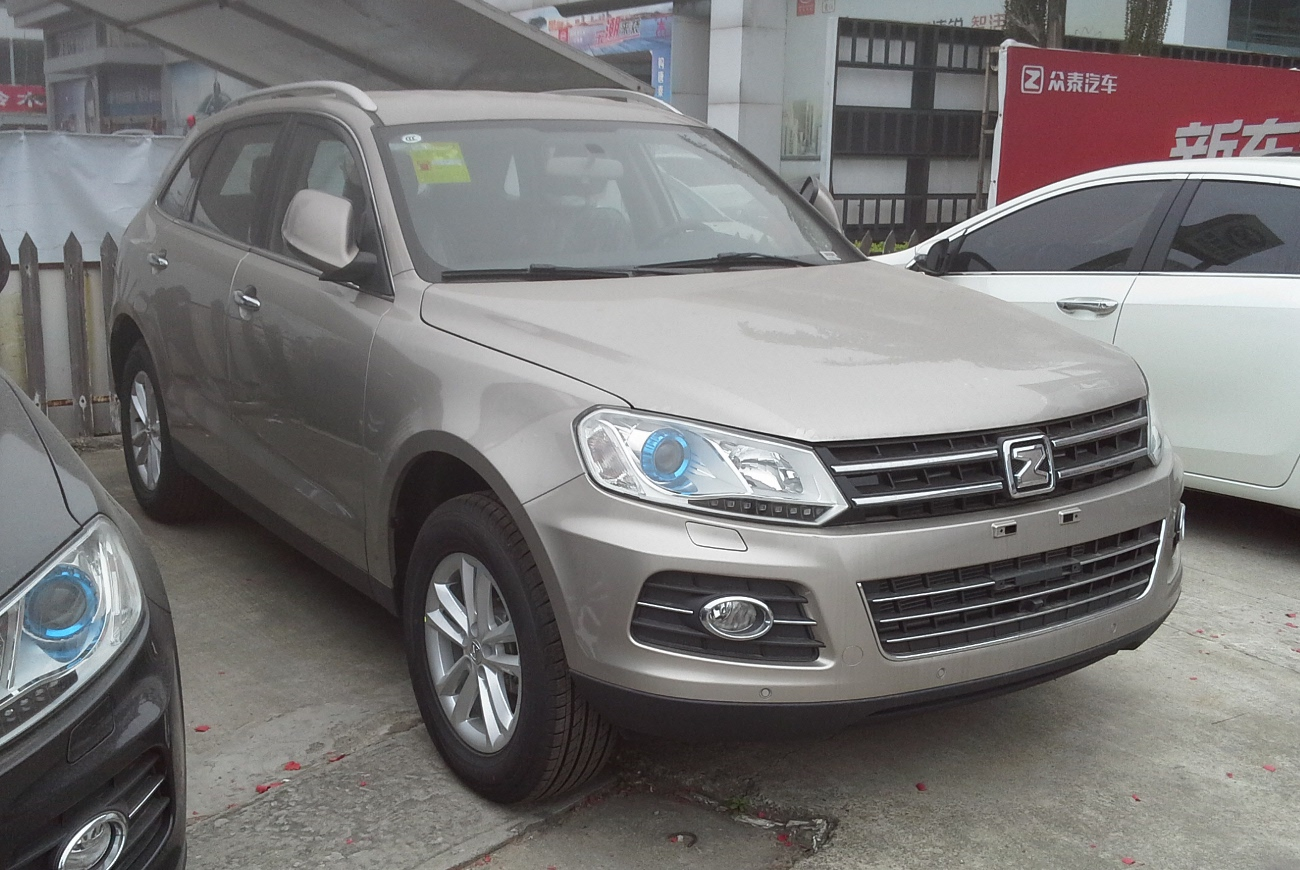
Zotye T600

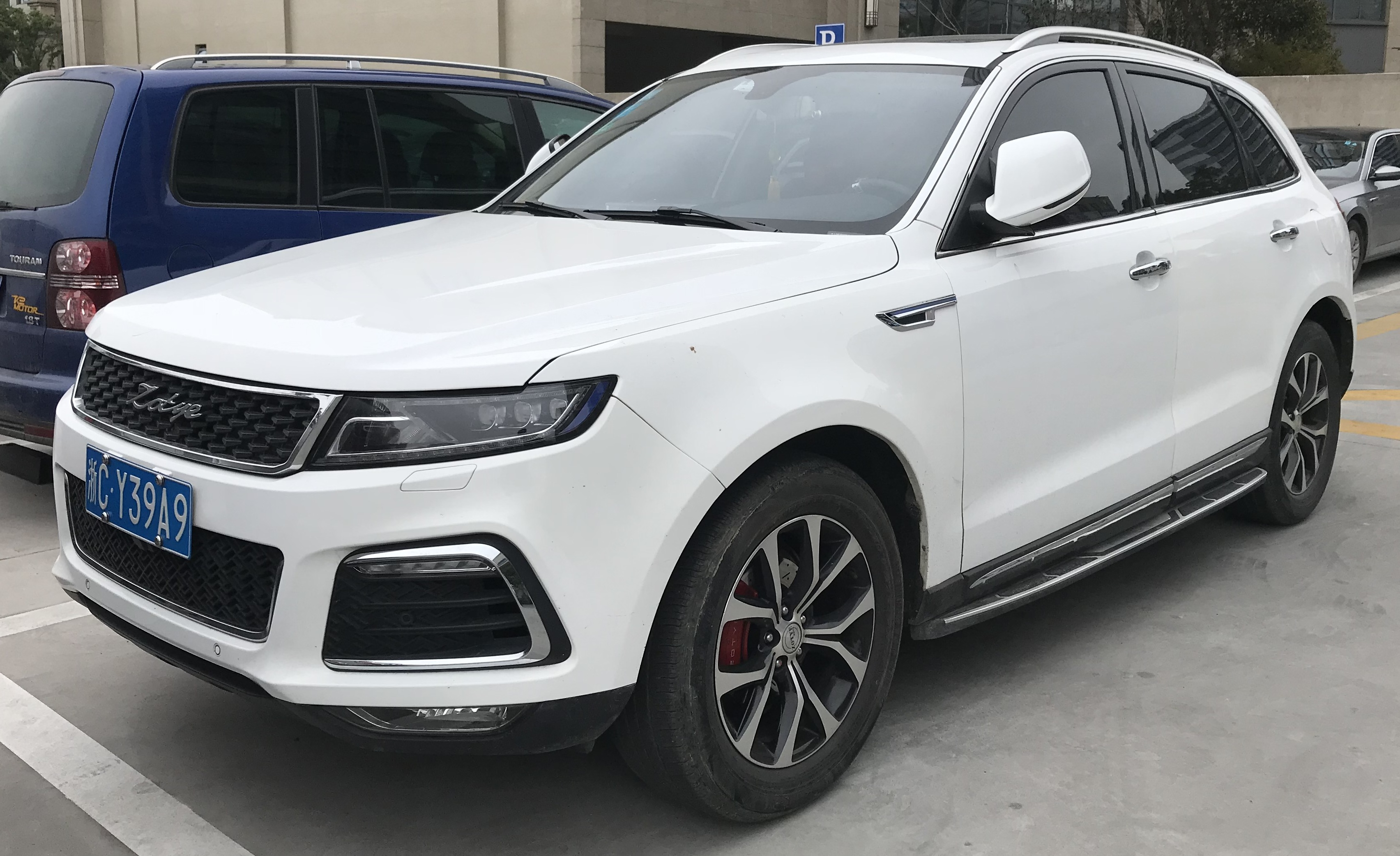
Zotye T600 Sport

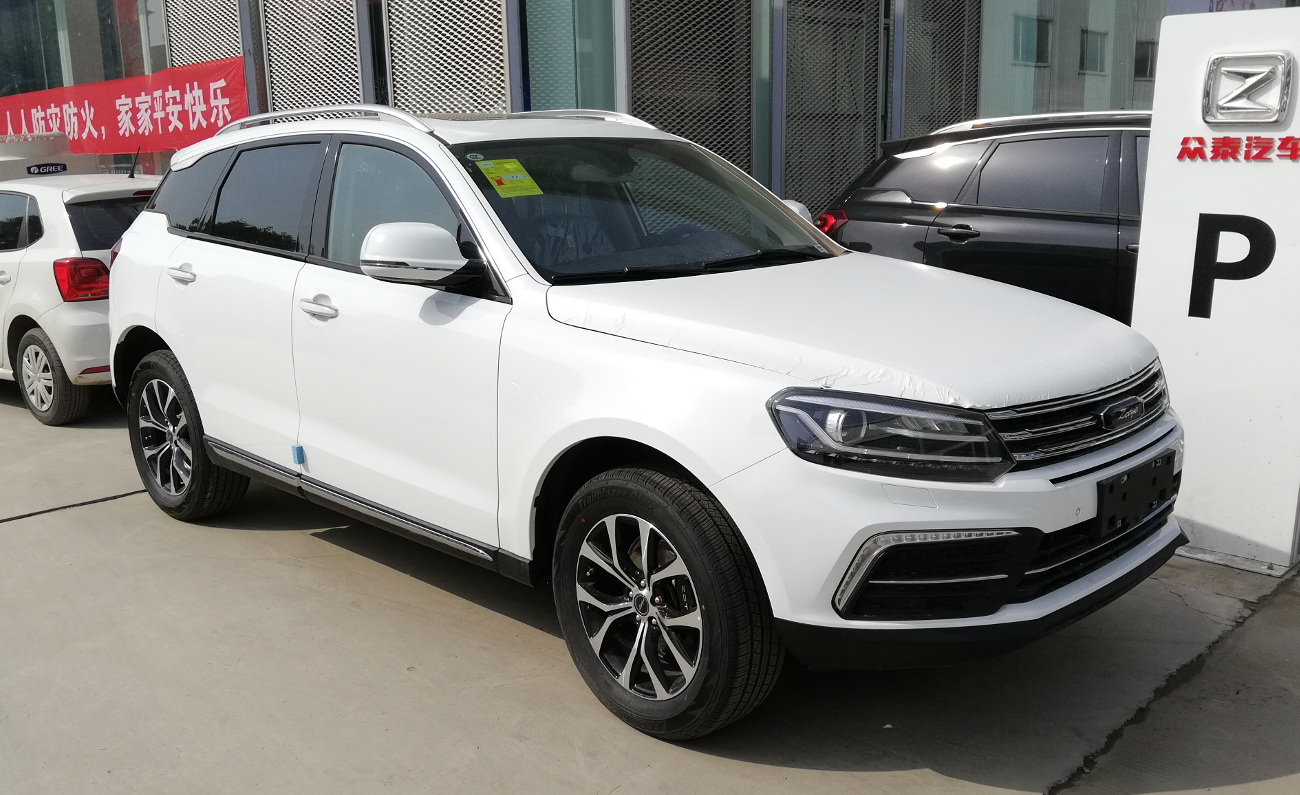
Zotye T600 Coupe

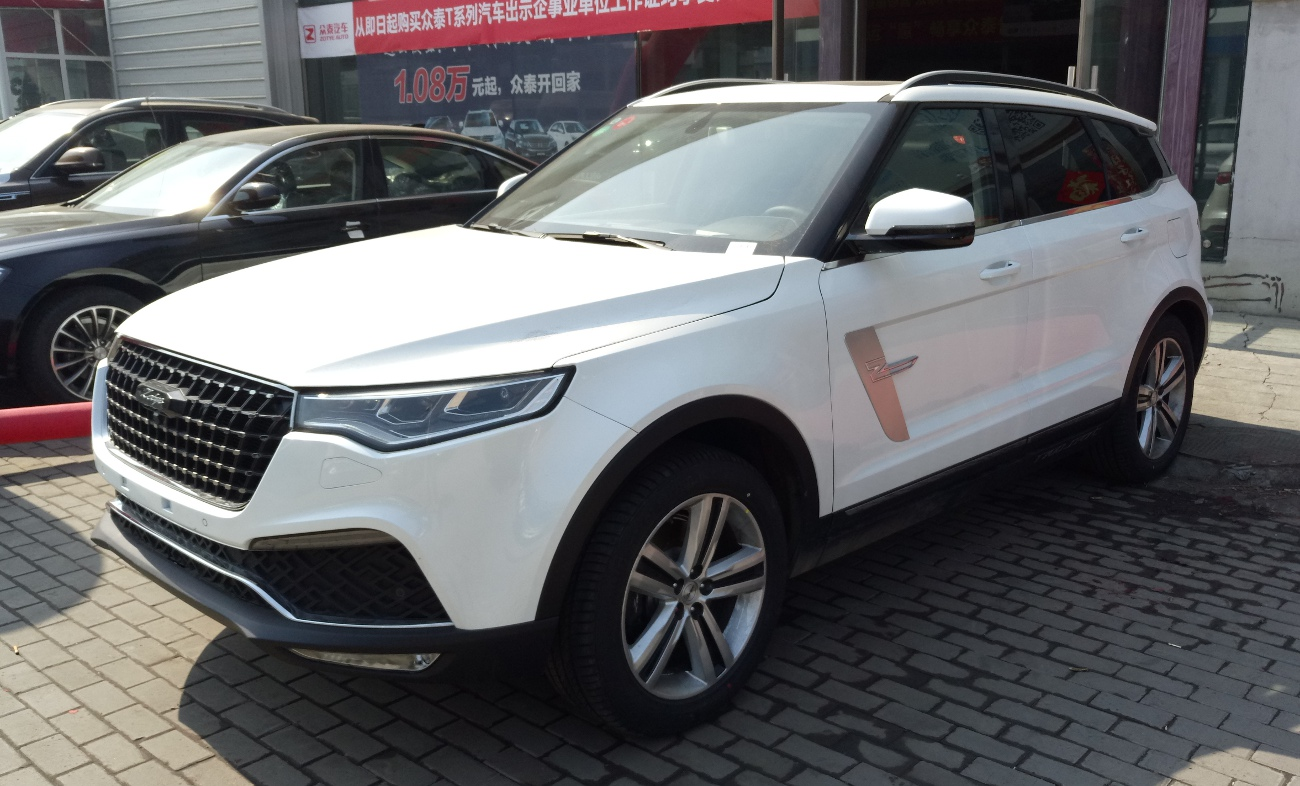
Zotye T700

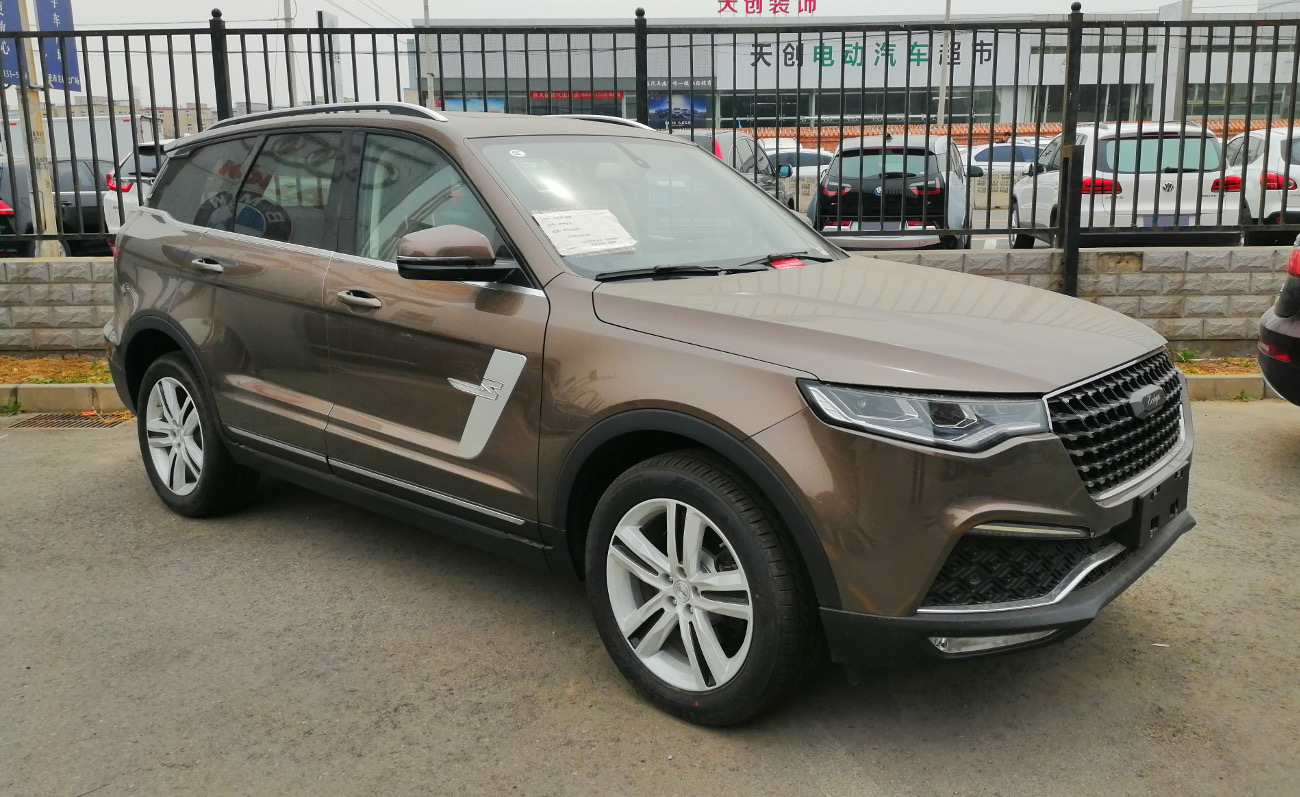
Zotye T800

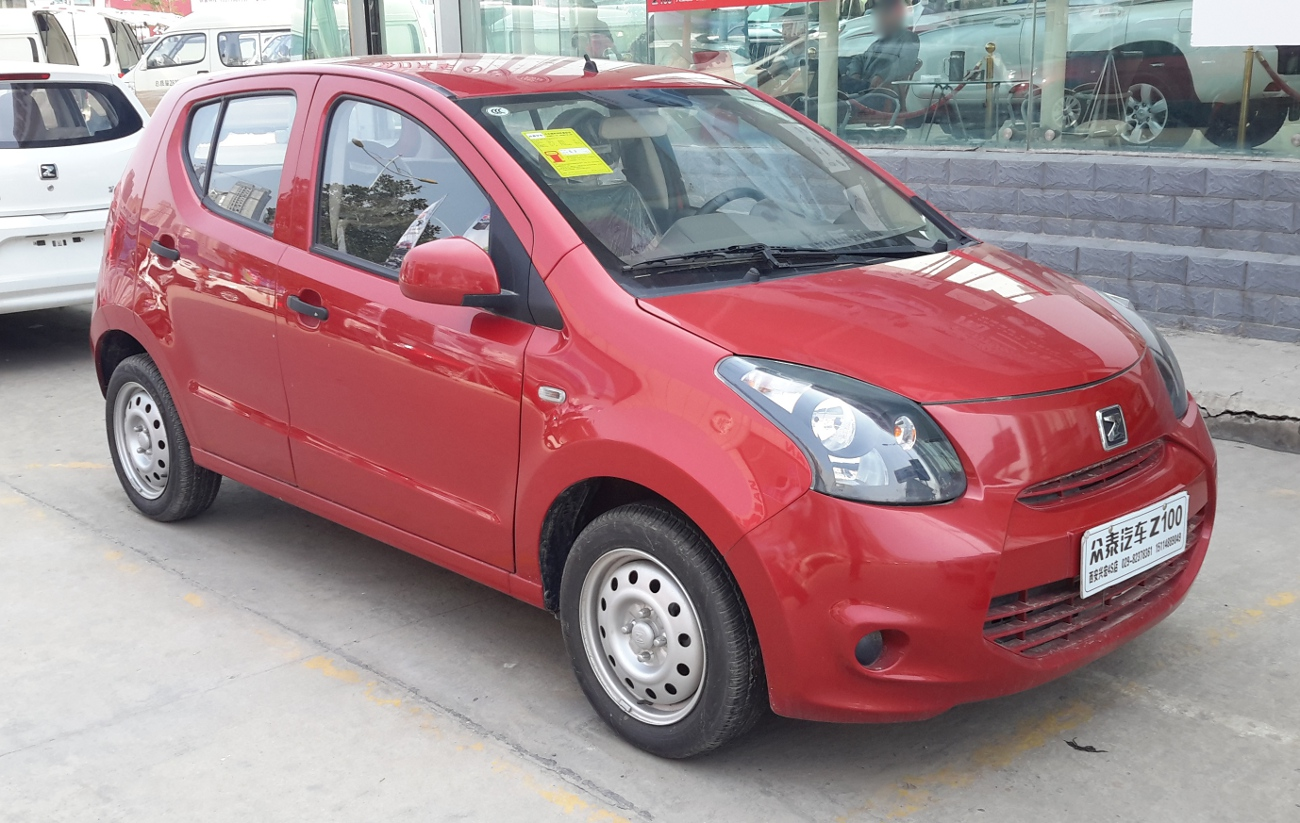
Zotye Z100

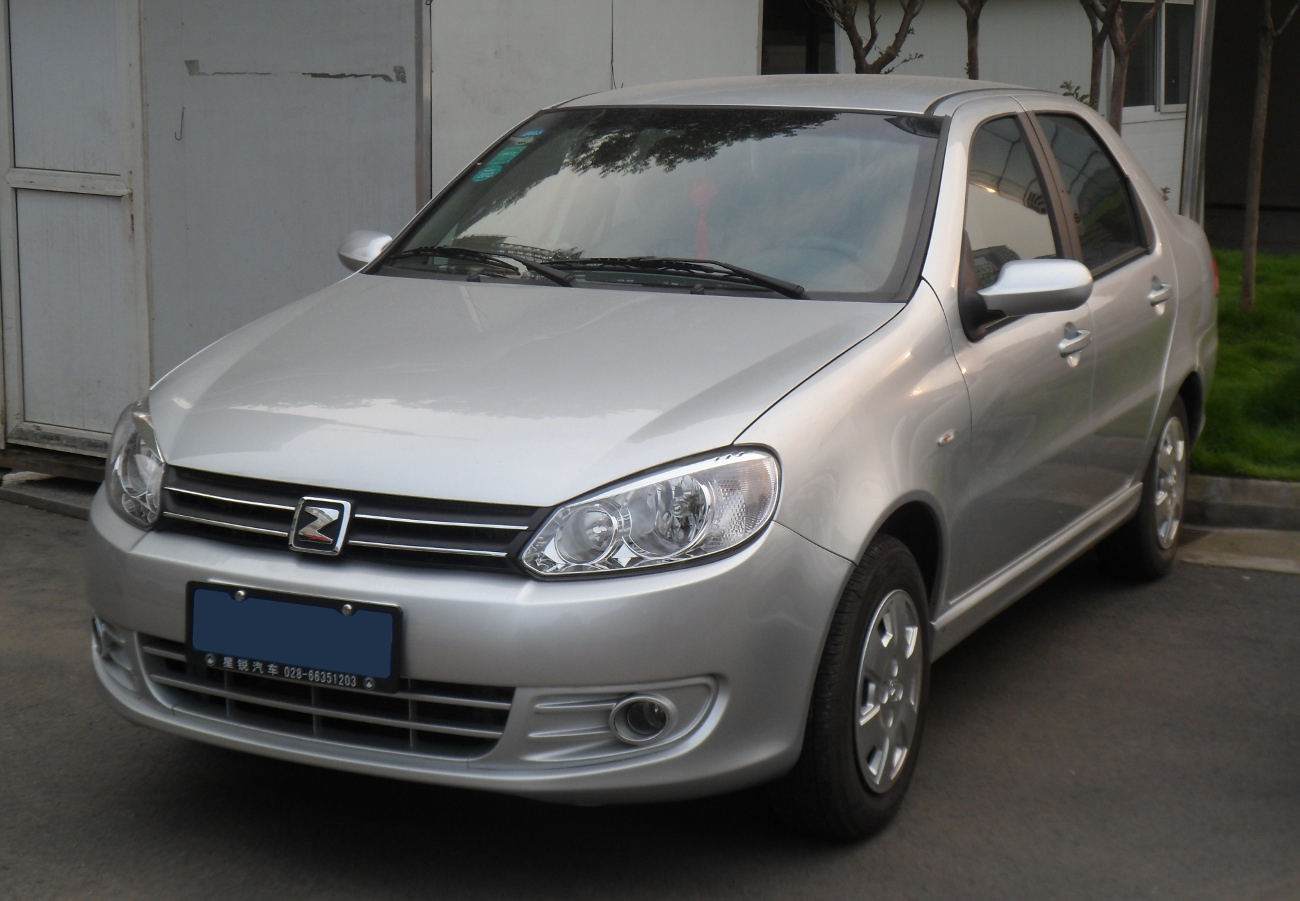
Zotye Z200

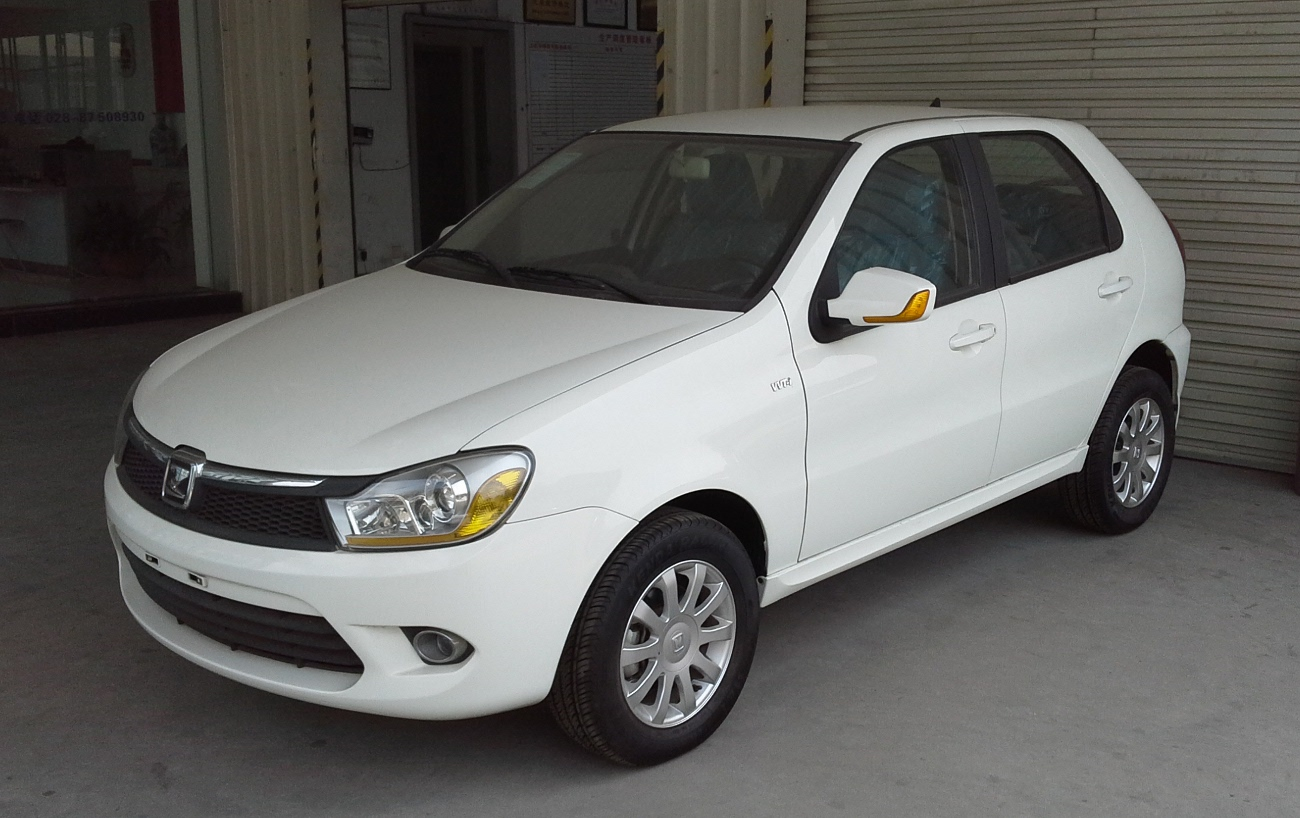
Zotye Z200HB

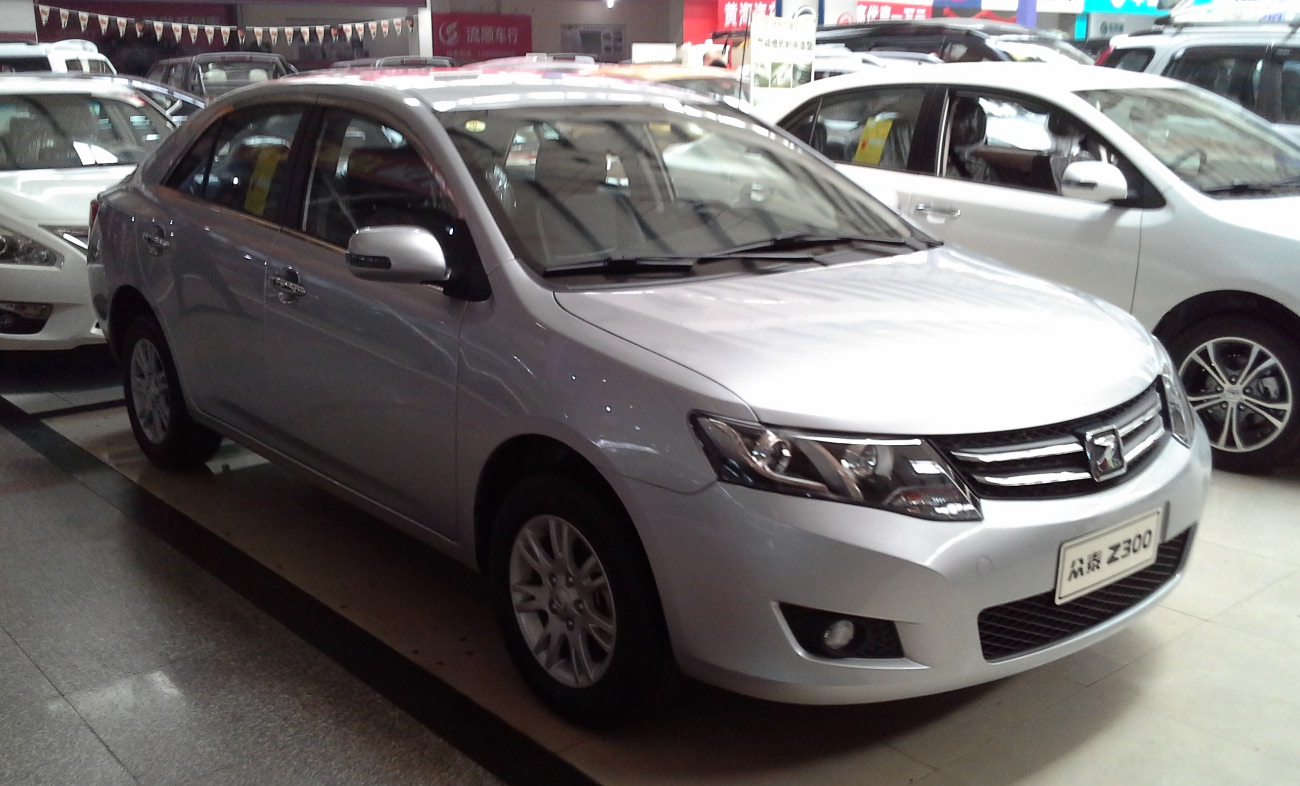
Zotye Z300

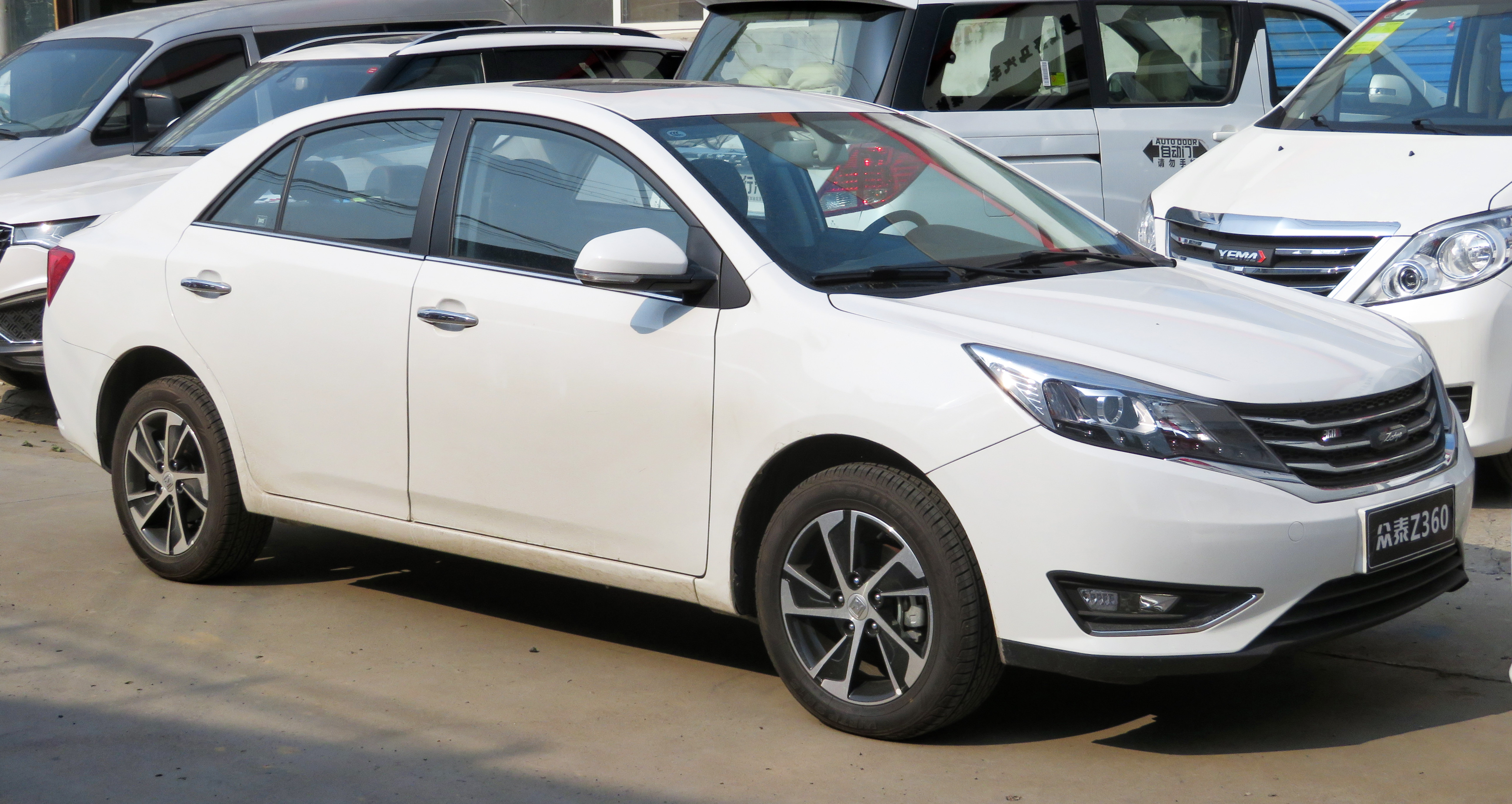
Zotye Z360

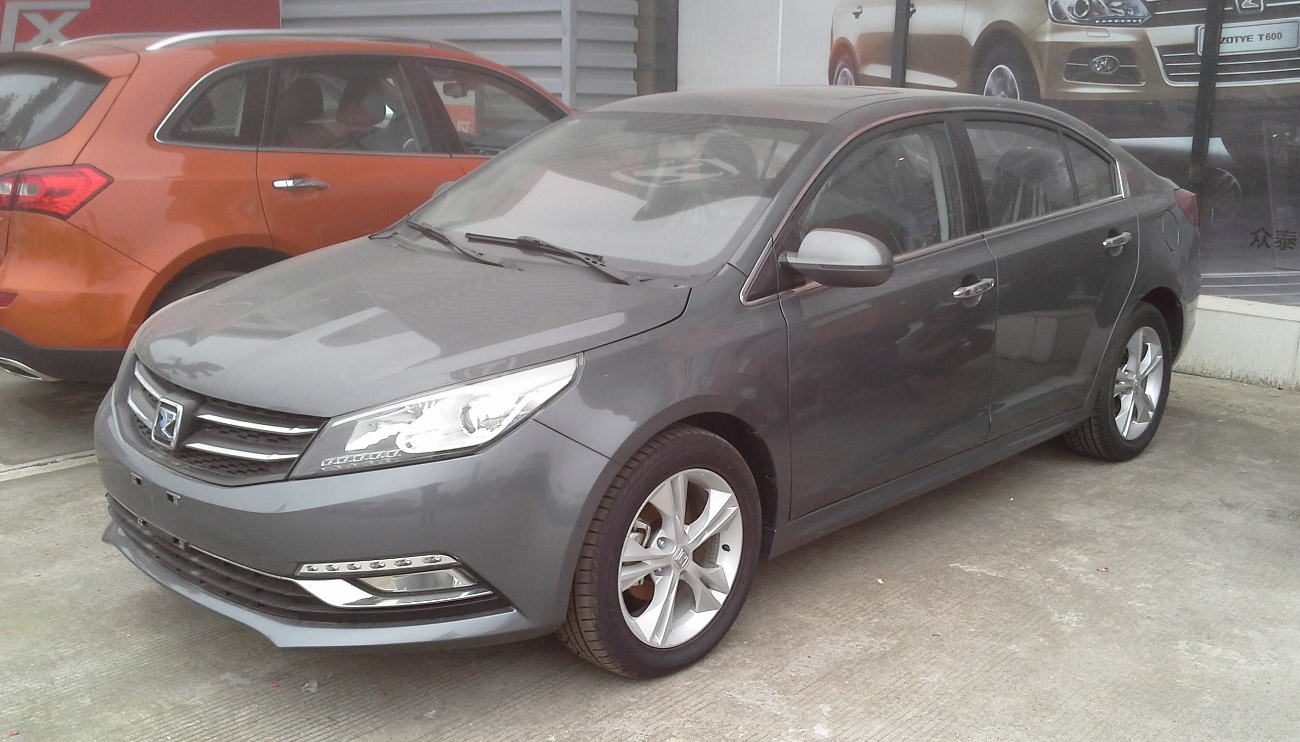
Zotye Z500

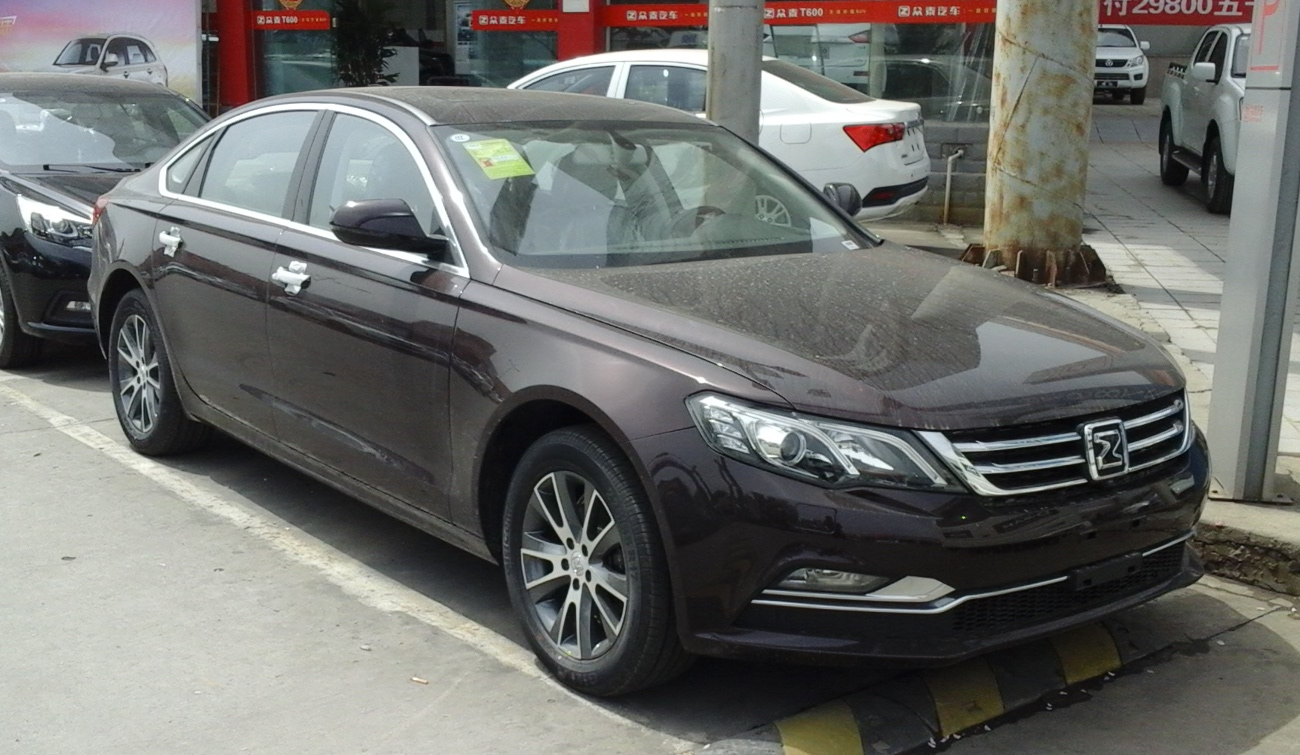
Zotye Z700

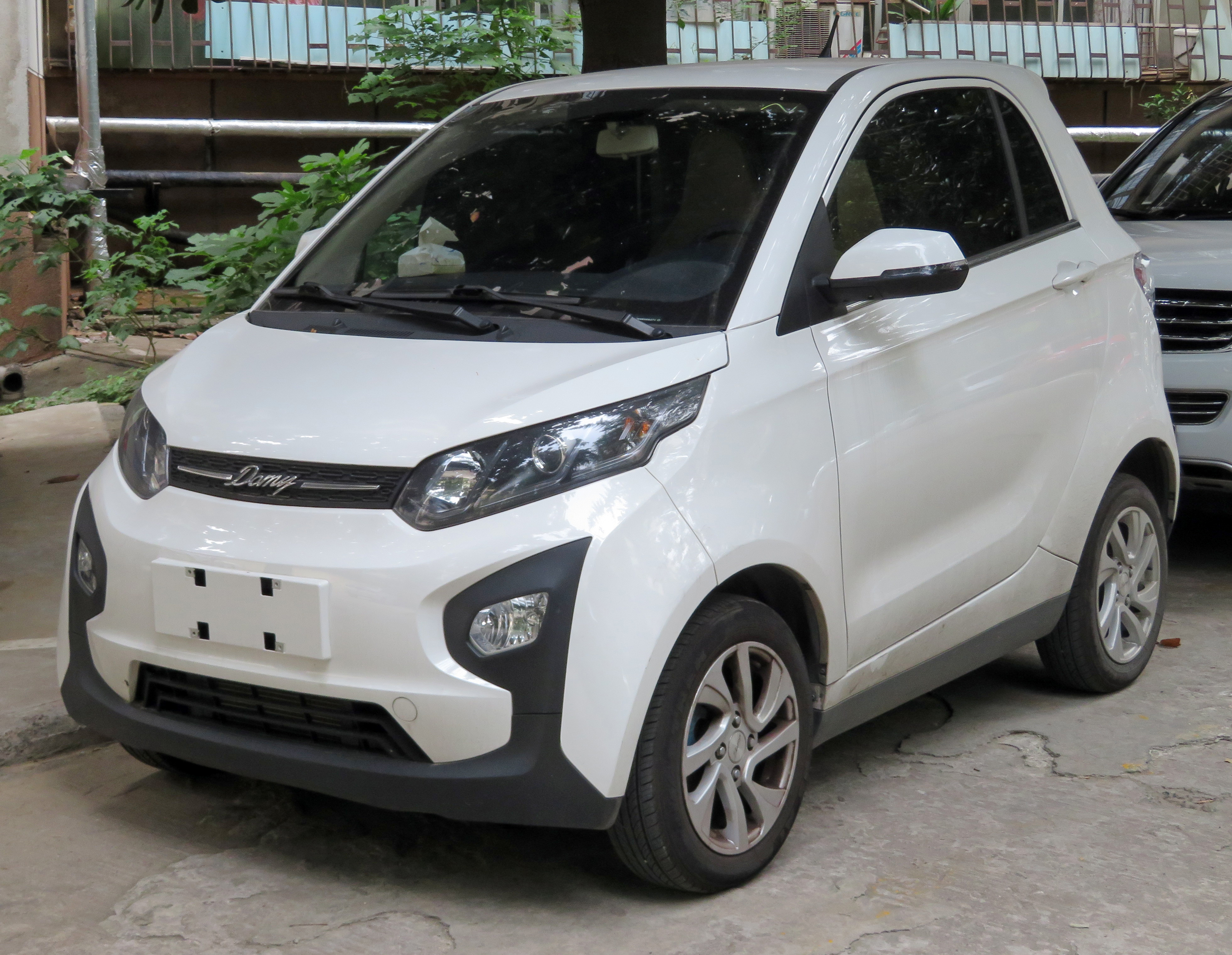
Zotye E30

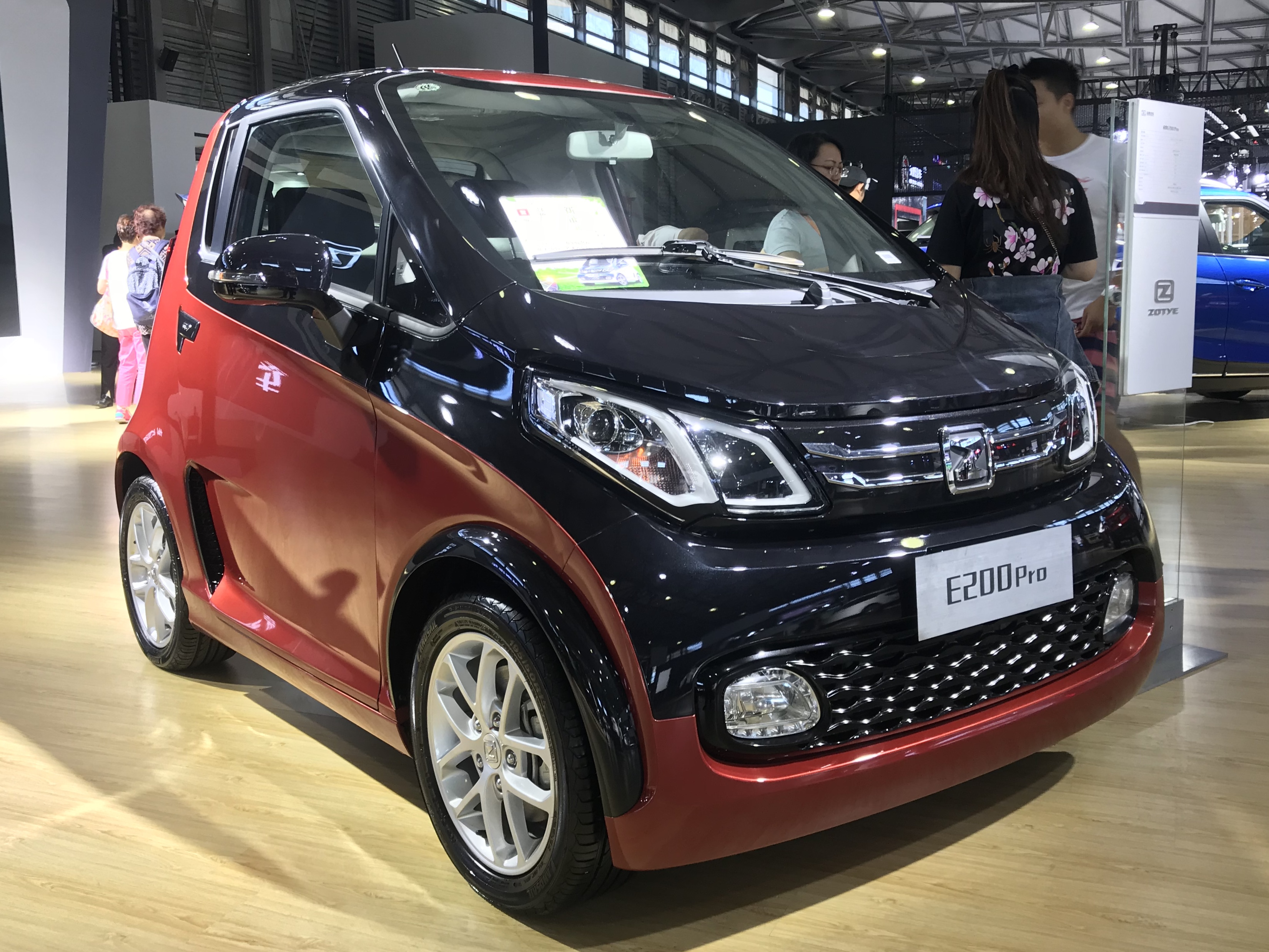
Zotye E200

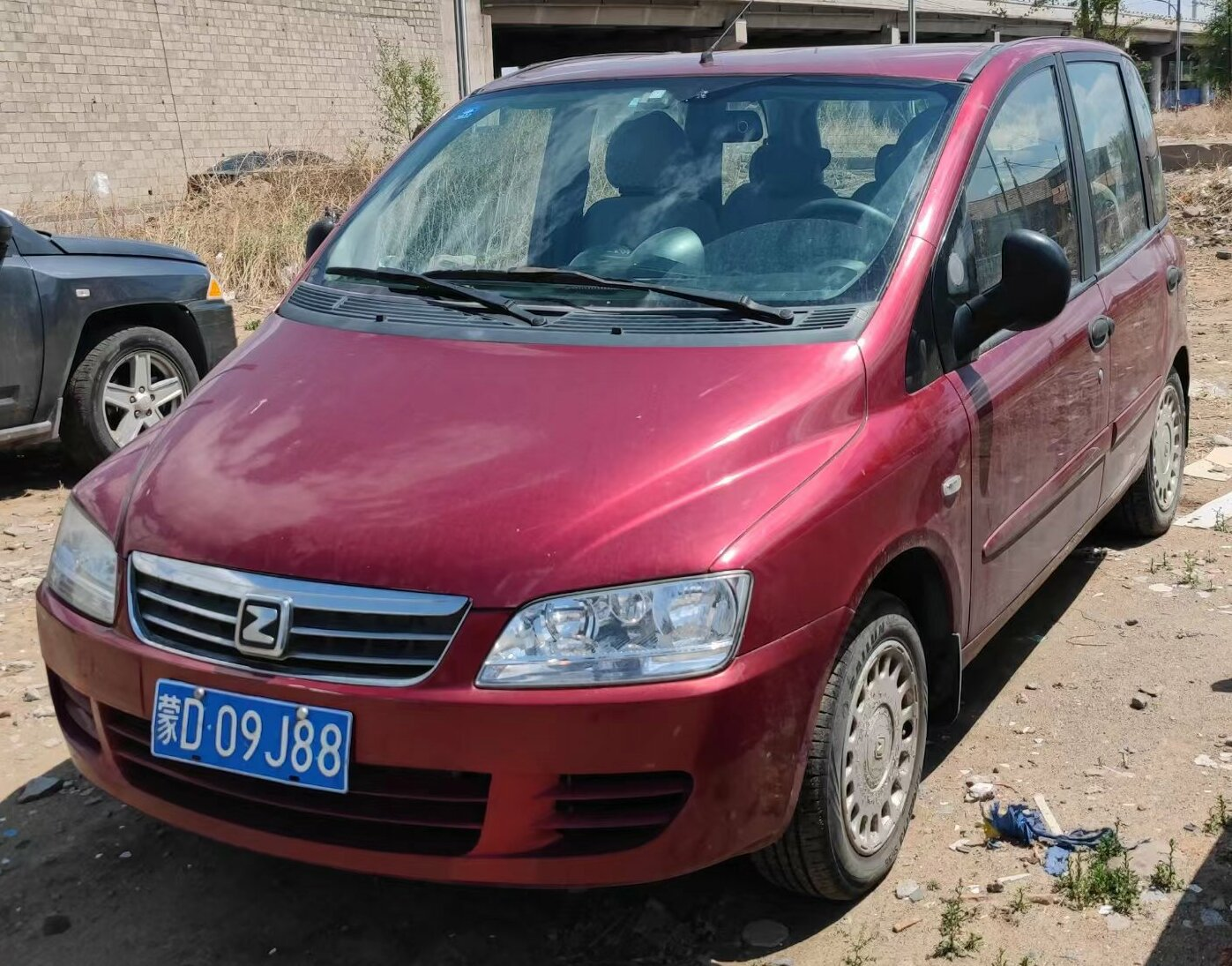
Zotye M300

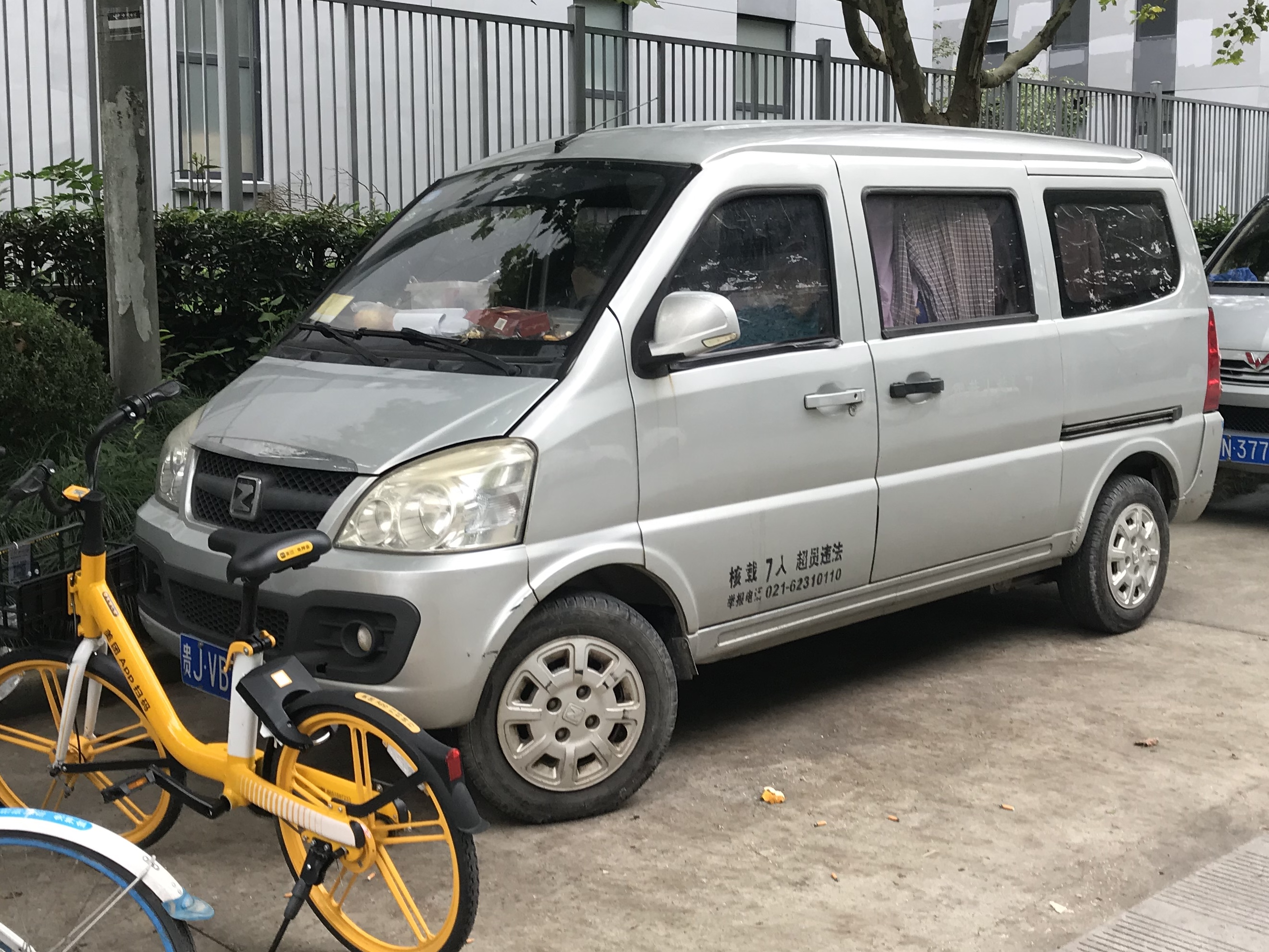
Zotye V10

== Sales ==
Calendar year	Sales (China only)
2007	28,577
2008	53,491
2009	64,510
2010	99,773
2011	99,148
2012	85,644
2013	102,920
2014	149,925
2015	223,327
2016	328,875
2017	311,266
