= Soueast DX7 =

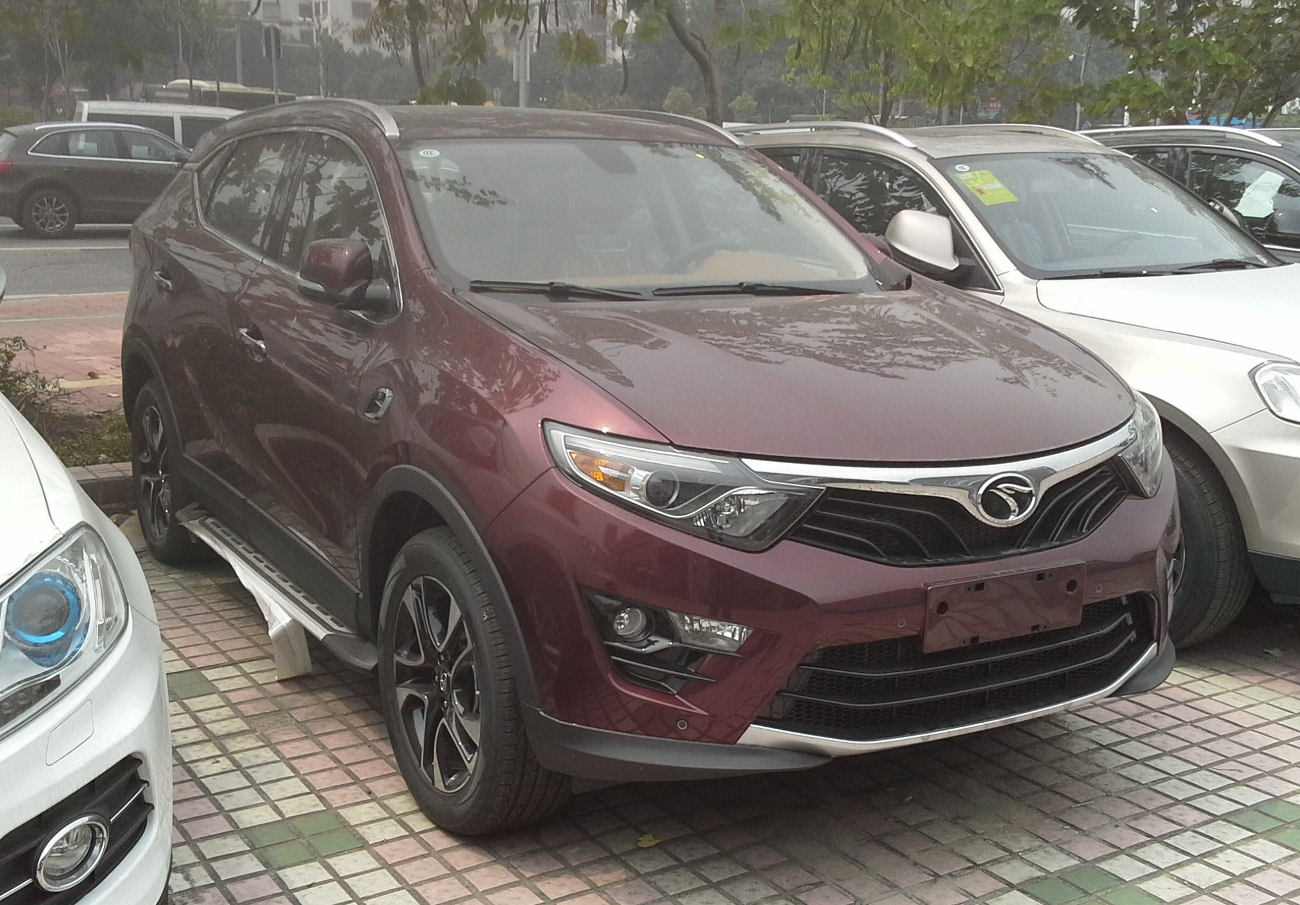
- Soueast DX7 Bolang (China)

Overview
- Manufacturer: Soueast
- Production: 2015–2023
- Designer: Pininfarina

Body and chassis
- Class: Compact SUV
- Body style: 5-door SUV
- Layout: four-wheel-drive

Powertrain
- Engine: 4A91 1.5 L turbo I4 (2015–2019); 4A95 1.5 L turbo I4 (2020–2023); 4G63 2.0 L turbo I4 (2015–2017); 4K10 1.8 L turbo I4 (2018–2019)
- Transmission: 6-speed manual 6-speed automatic DCT

Dimensions
- Wheelbase: 2,700 mm (106.3 in)
- Length: 4,537 mm (178.6 in)
- Width: 1,900 mm (74.8 in)
- Height: 1,700 mm (66.9 in)
- Curb weight: 1,485–1,495 kg (3,274–3,296 lb)

The Soueast DX7 is a mid-size crossover manufactured by Chinese automaker Soueast Motors. The model wasfirst launched as the DX7 Bolang in 2015 and received a facelift variant sold at a higher price called the DX7 Prime in 2018, and received another heavily facelifted variant called the DX7 Xingyue in 2020 with reworked chassis and performance.

== DX7 Bolang ==
The Soueast DX7 Bolang was previewed by the SouEast R7 Concept debuted during the 2014 Beijing Auto Show, while the production version of the DX7 crossover debuted on the 2014 Guangzhou Auto Show in November 2014 with the official market launch in the first quarter of 2015.

There are two inline-4 petrol engines sourced from Mitsubishi available for the Soueast DX7 including a 1.5 liter turbo engine producing 154hp and 210nm, and a 2.0 liter turbo engine producing 190hp and 250nm with both engines mated to a six-speed manual gearbox or a six-speed automatic gearbox.

Pricing ranges from 120,000 yuan to 160,000 yuan.

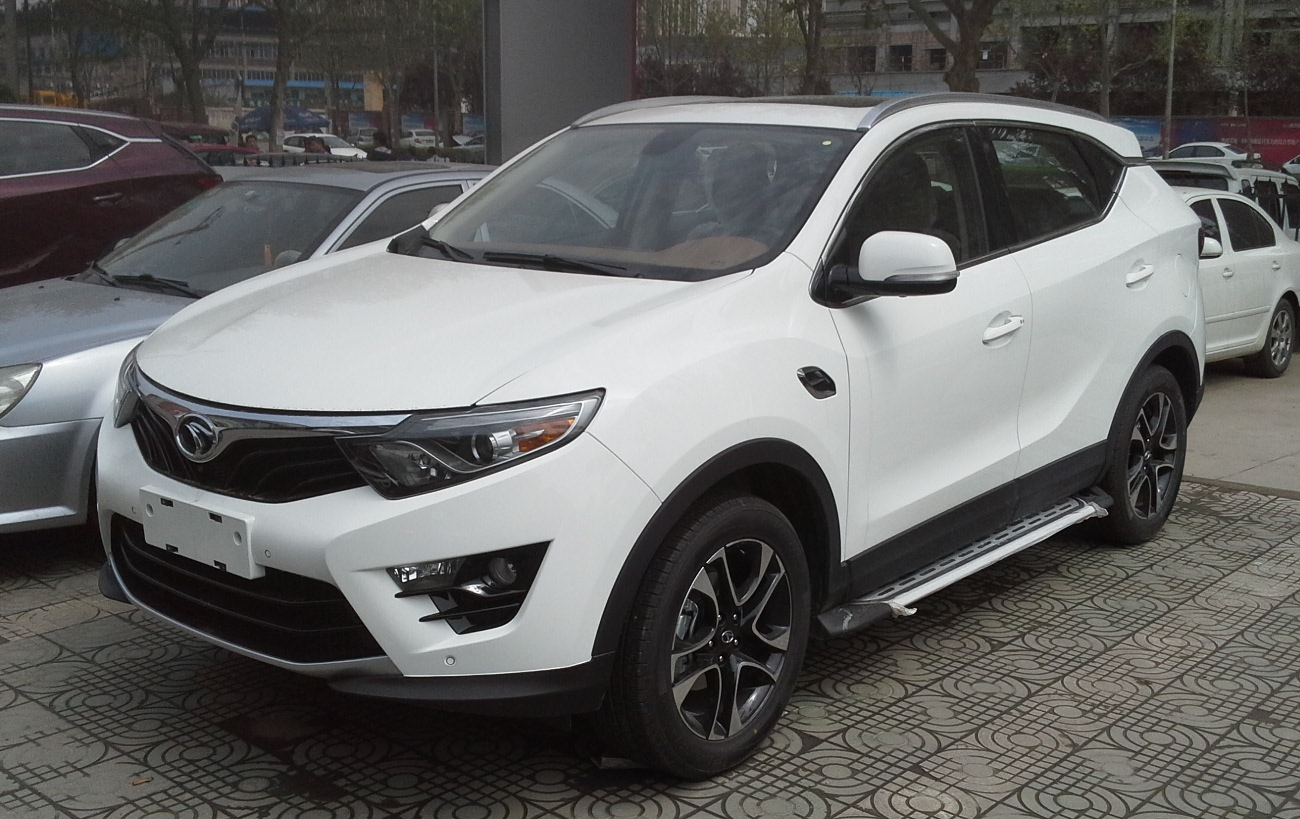
Soueast DX7 Bolang

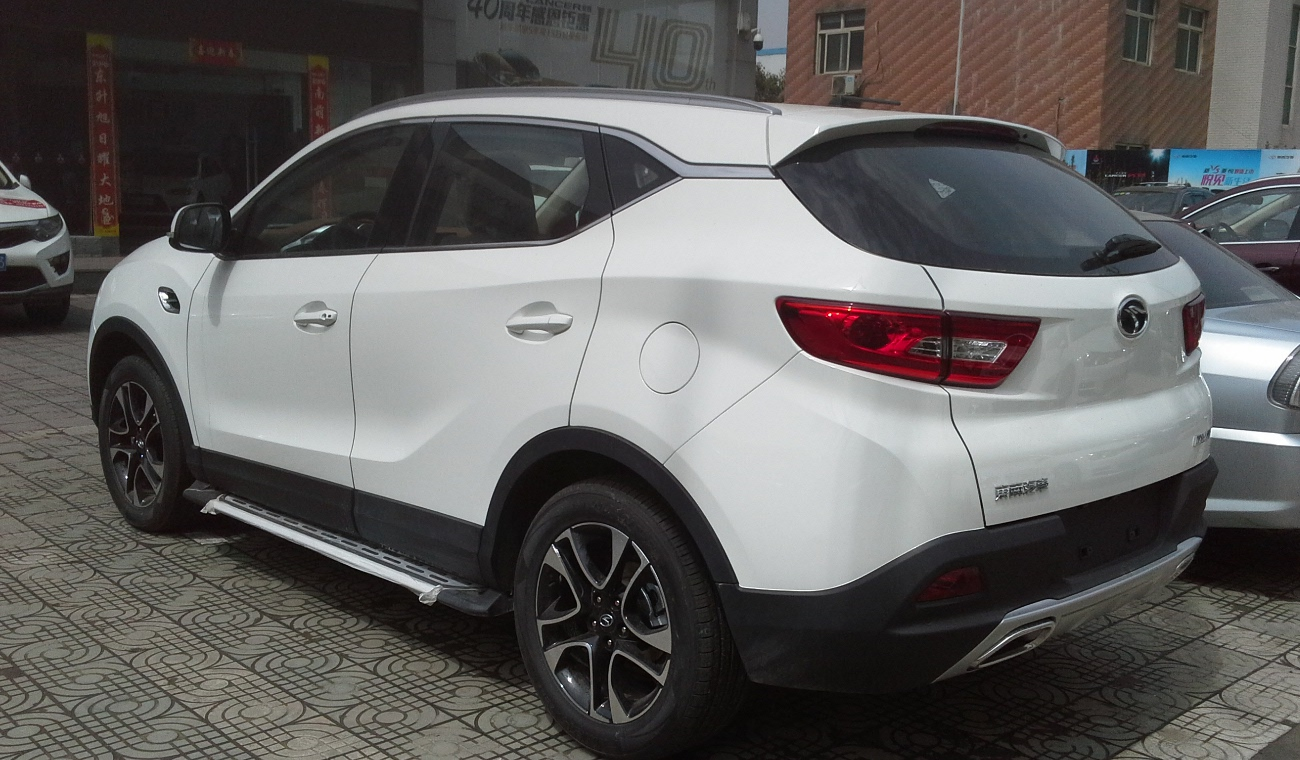
rear

== DX7 Prime (2018 facelift) ==
A sportier DX7 Prime trim was introduced later in 2018 with subtly revised front and rear styling, interior upgrades, and a DCT.

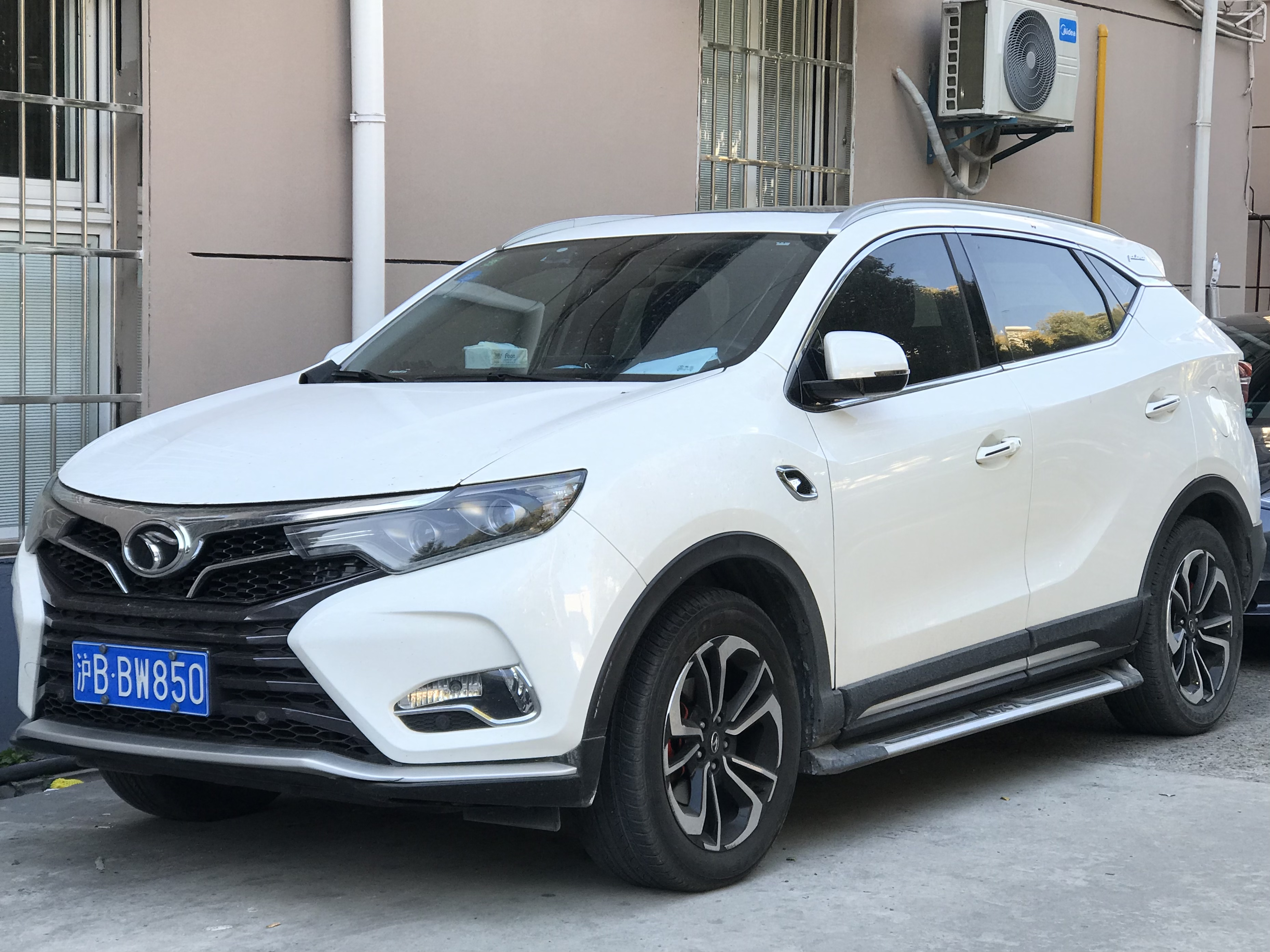
Soueast DX7 Prime (2018 facelift)

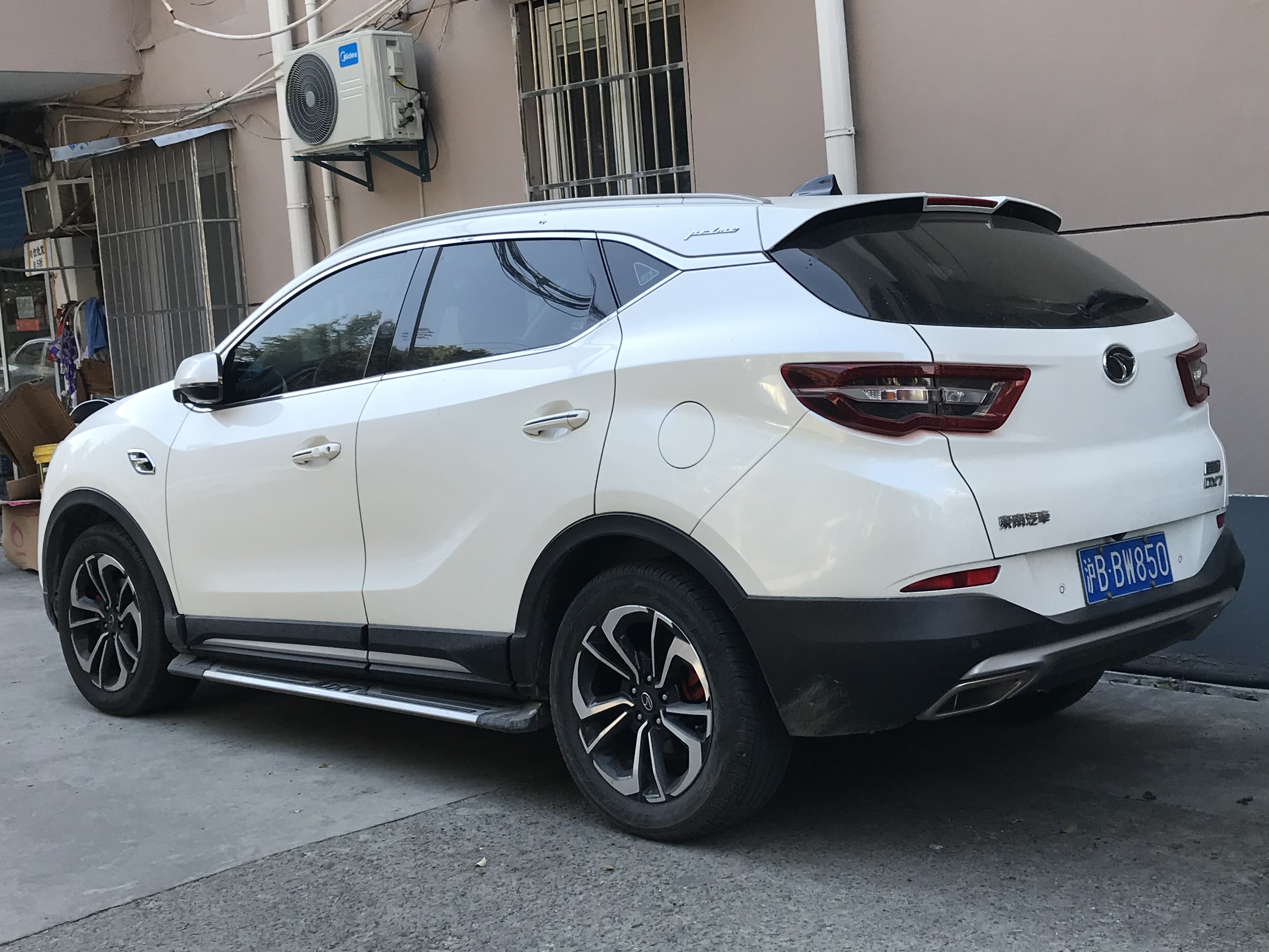
rear

== DX7 Xingyue (2020 facelift) ==
The DX7 Xingyue is the heavily updated version of the DX7 launched in 2020. The DX7 Xingyue is equipped with another 1.5-litre turbo engine producing 176 HP and 259 N • m designated by the code 4A95TD. The gearbox of the DX7 Xingyue is a Getrag 7-speed dual-clutch transmission. The chassis of the DX7 Xingyue that features McPherson and multi-link suspension system has been re-tuned and additionally, adaptive cruise control was added for level 2 semi-autonomous driving with lane-keeping, auto-braking and self-parking.

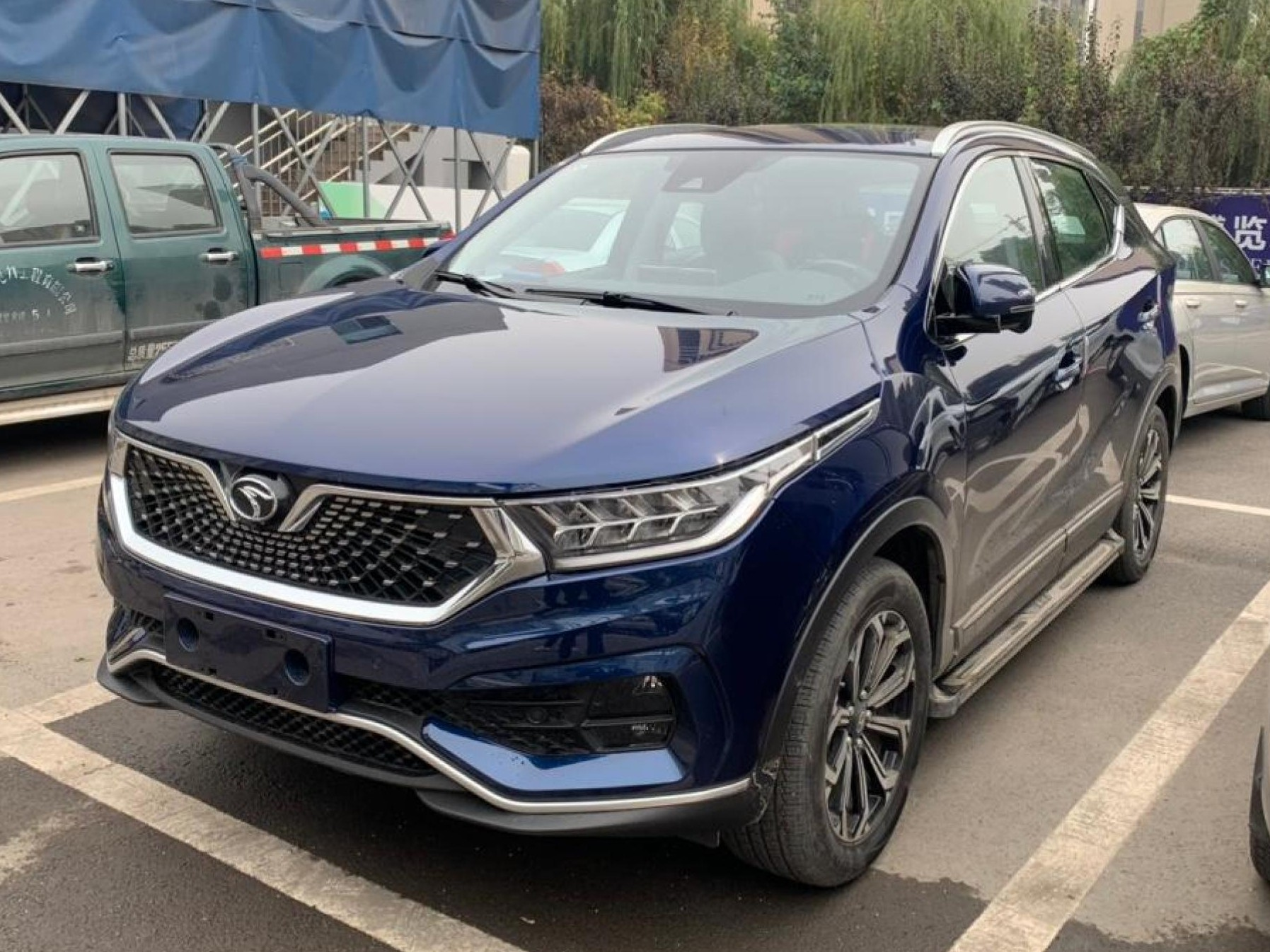
Soueast DX7 Xingyue

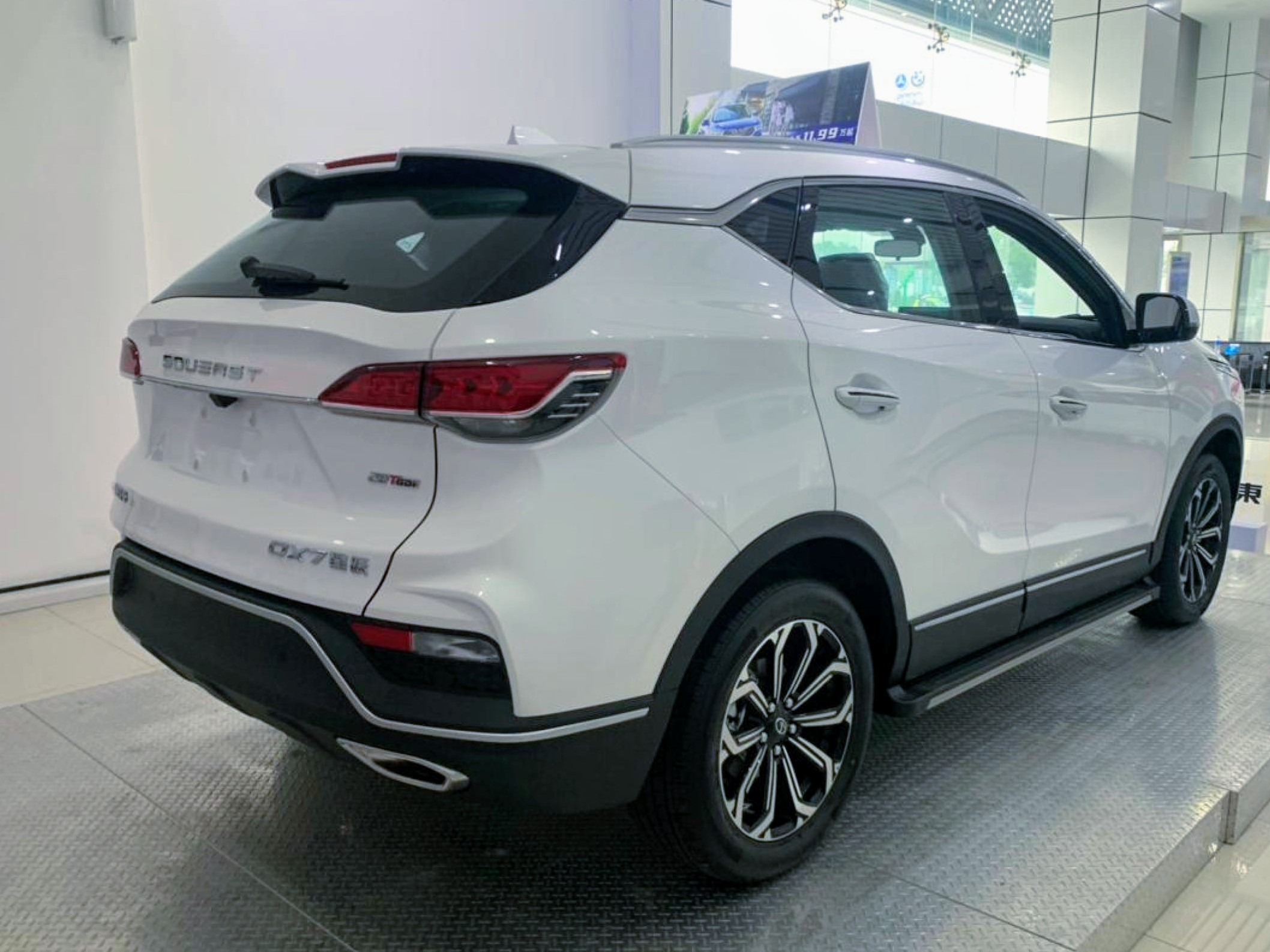
rear
