= SR9 =

SR9 may refer to:

- Heckler & Koch SR9, a semi-automatic rifle
- Ruger SR9, a semi-automatic pistol
- List of highways numbered 9
- Zotye SR9, a mid-size CUV
