= JMC Teshun =

Light commercial van

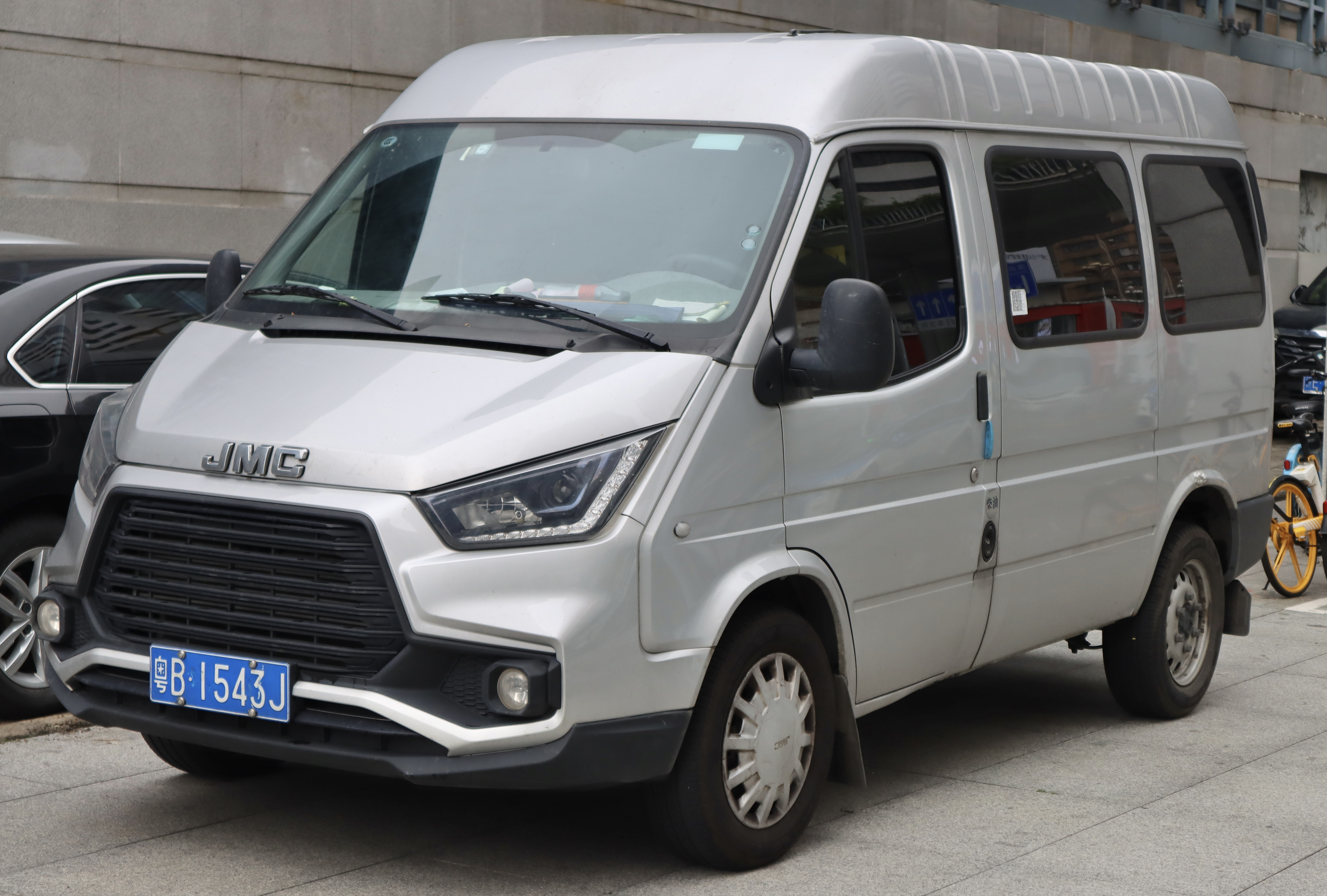

Overview
- Manufacturer: Jiangling Motors
- Also called: JMC Touring (Latin America); JMC Transporter (Philippines); JMC Jingma Fuyun EV (EV by JMC Jingma)
- Production: 2017–present
- Assembly: China: Nanchang; Philippines: Santa Rosa, Laguna (Jiangling-DreamCo)

Body and chassis
- Body style: 4-door van
- Layout: FR layout
- Platform: VE83

Powertrain
- Engine: Petrol: 2.4L 4G64 I4; Diesel: 2.8L 4JB1 I4
- Electric motor: Permanent magnet synchronous (EV)
- Power output: 81 kW (108 hp; 109 PS) (4G64); 87 kW (116 hp; 118 PS) (4JB1); 120 kW (161 hp; 163 PS) (EV)
- Transmission: 5-speed manual 1-speed direct-drive (EV)
- Battery: 85.89 kWh Li-ion CATL (EV)
- Electric range: 345 km (214 mi) (CLTC, EV)

Dimensions
- Wheelbase: 2,835 mm (111.61 in) (SWB); 3,570 mm (140.55 in) (LWB)
- Length: 5,418 mm (213.31 in)
- Width: 1,963 mm (77.27 in)
- Height: 2,232 mm (87.87 in)
- Kerb weight: 1,920–2,030 kg (4,233–4,475 lb)

Chronology
- Predecessor: Ford Transit (China)

The JMC Teshun is a light commercial van manufactured by Jiangling Motors based on the second generation Ford Transit.

== Design ==
Originally being a licensed Ford Transit production, the Jiangling-Ford model was sold from 2006 to 2017 and styling remained unchanged throughout the model years sold as a Ford product.

Starting from May 2017, a version of the old Transit manufactured by JMC was rebadged and slightly redesigned with a completely new front DRG and restyled tail lamp inserts. The rebadged version was then called the JMC Teshun. Pricing ranges from 99,800 yuan to 139,200 yuan.

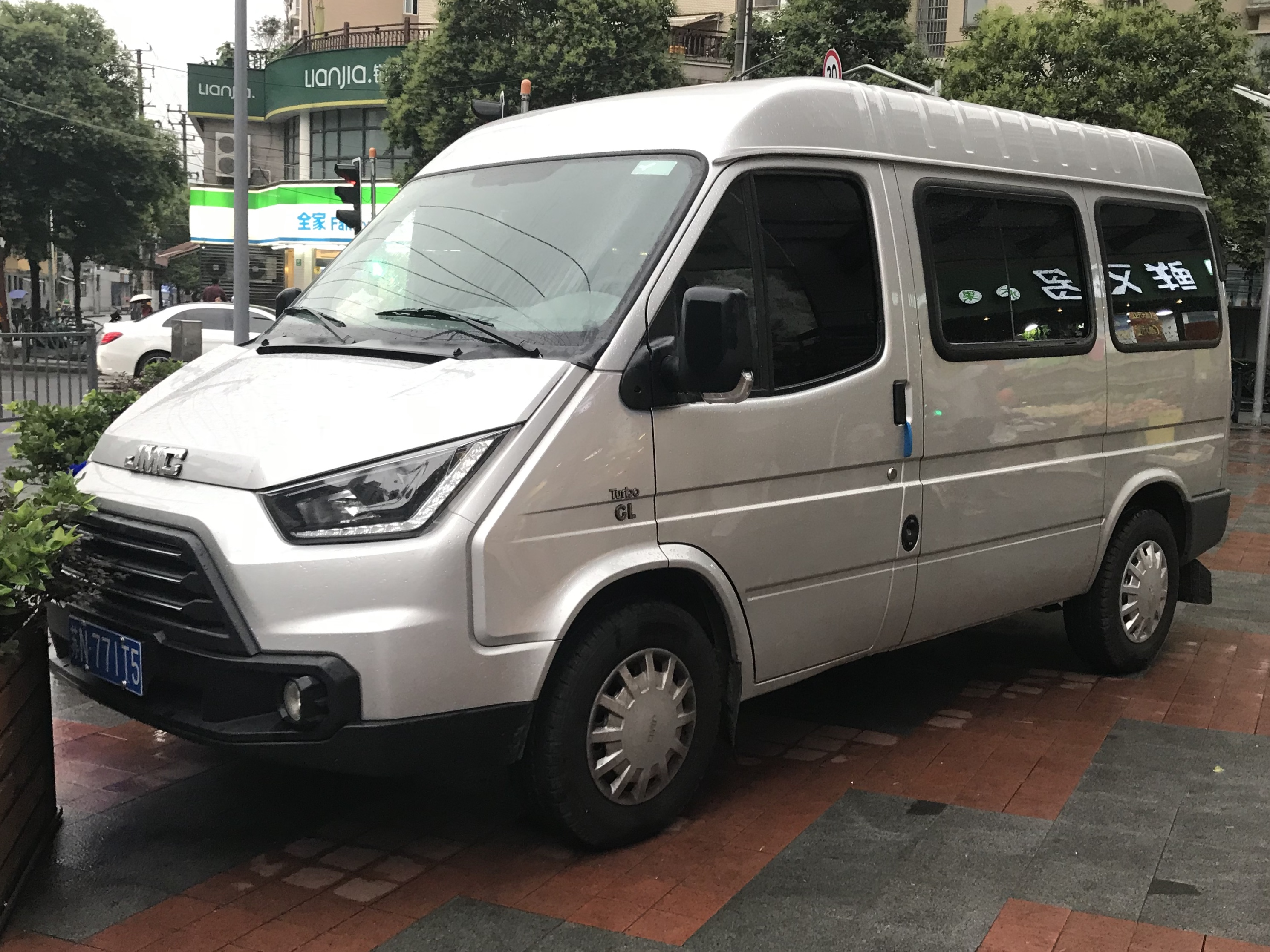
JMC Teshun front

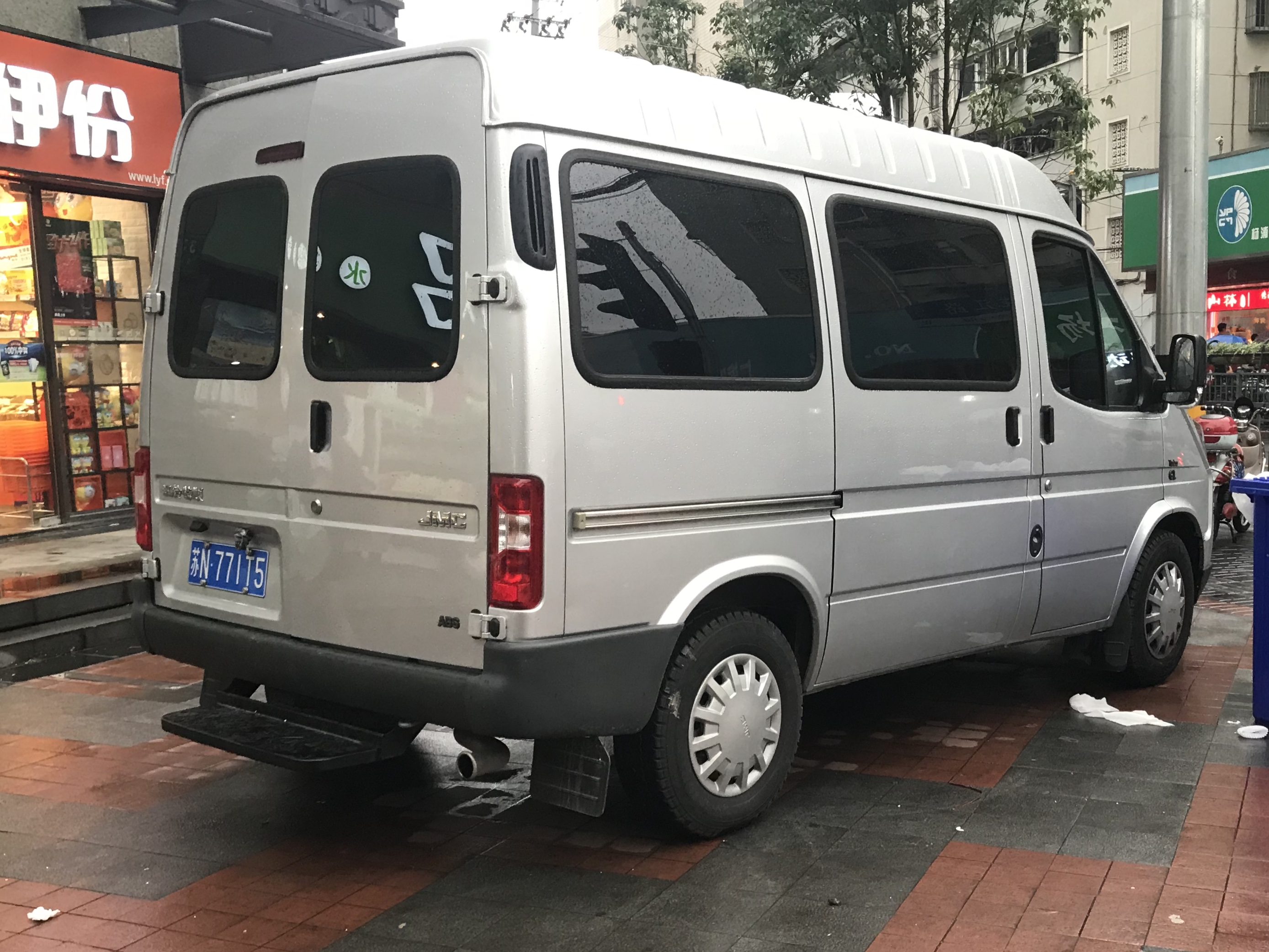
JMC Teshun rear

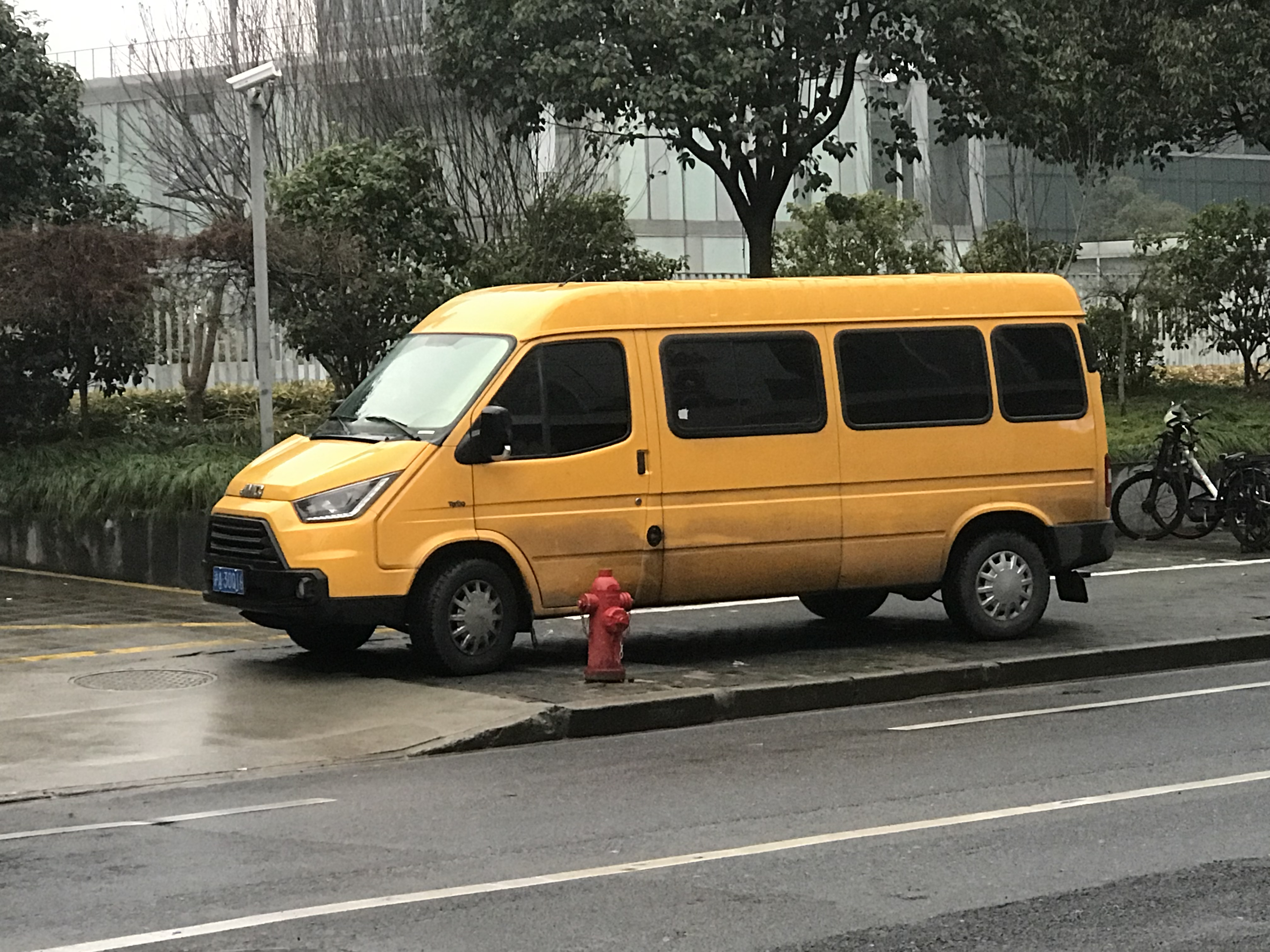
JMC Teshun LWB front

=== Specifications ===
The Teshun is powered by a range of engine options: a 2.8-liter turbodiesel engine producing 108 hp (81 kW; 109 PS), or a 4G69S4N 2.4-liter inline-4 gasoline engine producing 136 hp (101 kW; 138 PS). Both engines are mated to a 5-speed manual gearbox. The JMC Teshun is available in 3-seater, 6- to 8-seater, 10-seater, and 14- to 15-seater models matching with a selection of low, middle, and tall roof options.

=== 2020 facelift ===
A facelift of the Teshun was launched in 2020, featuring a slightly redesigned front bumper. The updated model range also features an additional 9-seater layout and engines that meet both National V and National VI emissions standards, with the engine being a 2.8-liter turbo diesel engine producing 116 hp (87 kW; 118 PS) and 285 N⋅m (210 lb⋅ft) mated to a 5-speed manual gearbox.

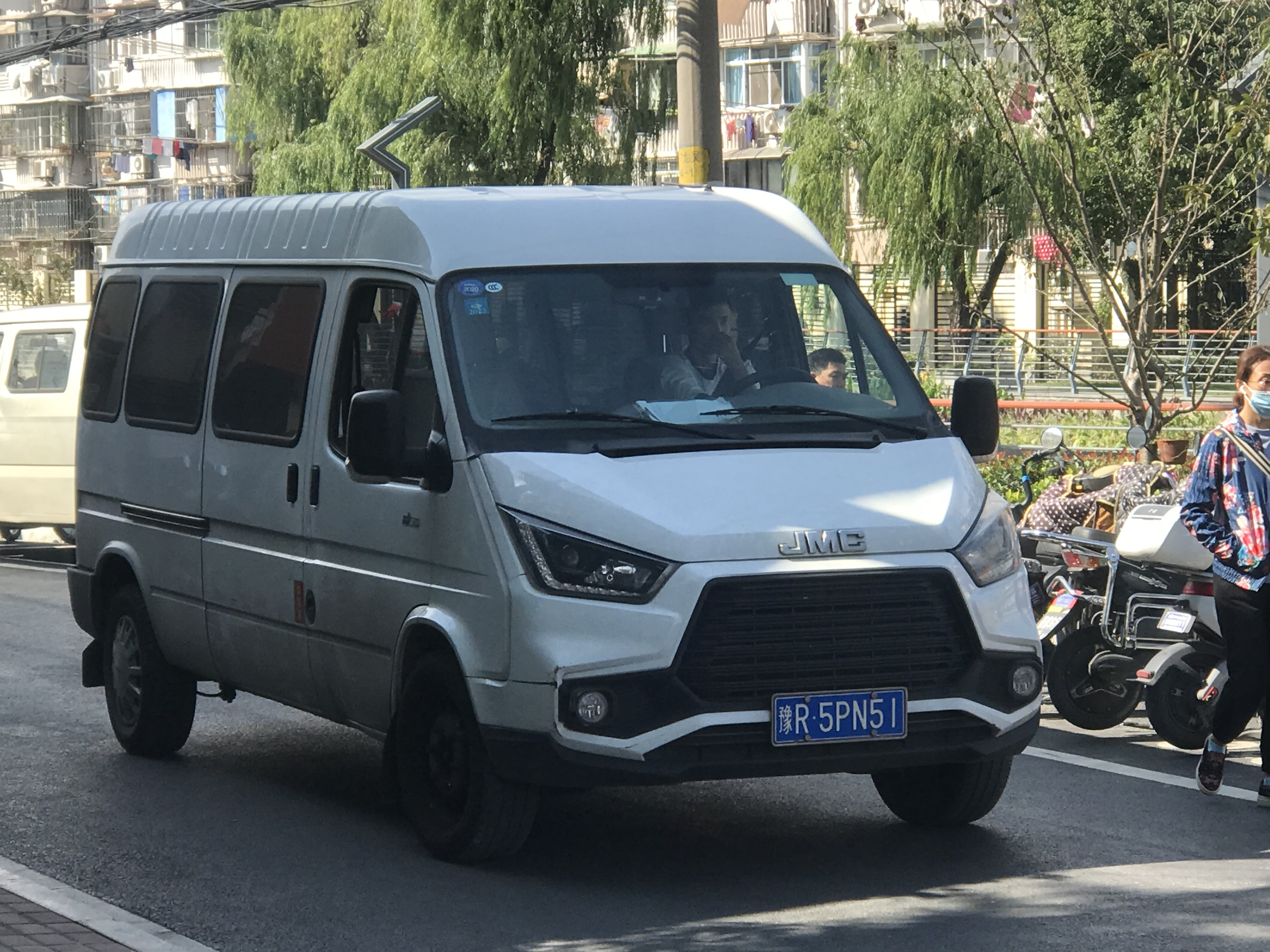
JMC Teshun 2020 facelift

=== 2021 facelift ===
Another facelift was launched in 2021, featuring a redesigned front fascia. The updated model range also features the same 2.8-liter turbo diesel engine producing 116 hp (87 kW; 118 PS) and 285 N⋅m (210 lb⋅ft) mated to a 5-speed manual gearbox. An additional Taurus Edition is also available featuring gold accents on the exterior and interior.

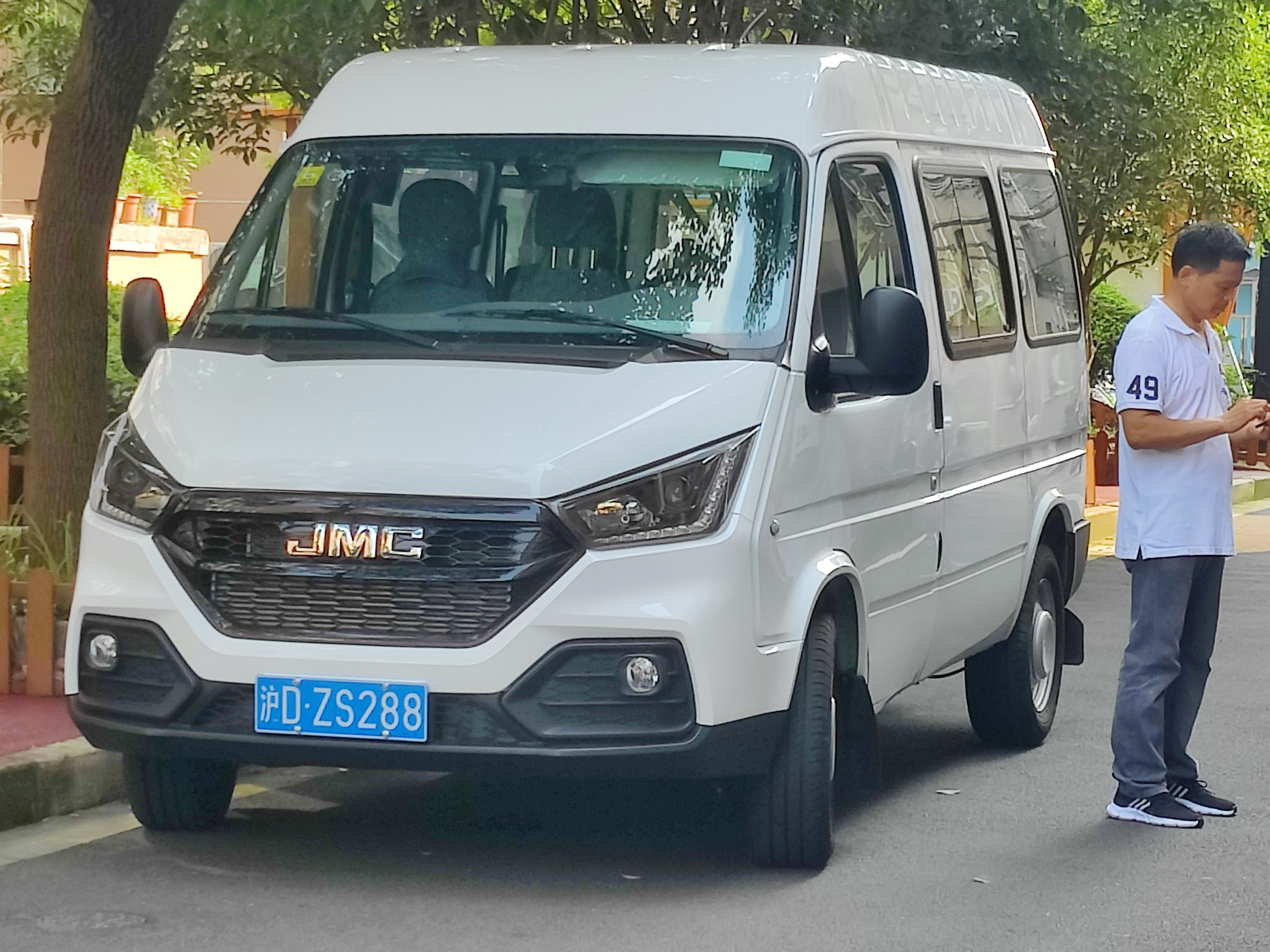
JMC Teshun 2021 facelift

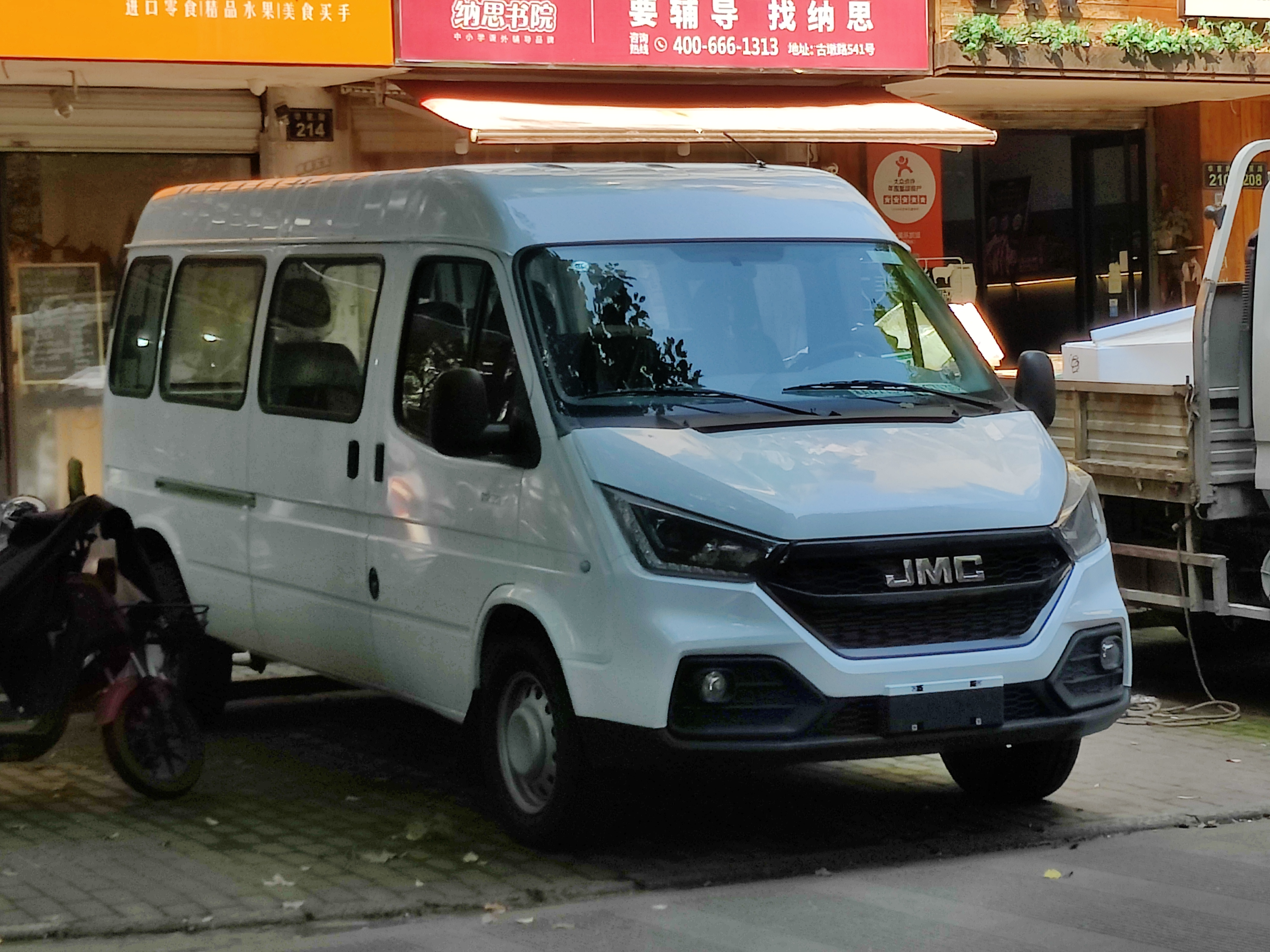
JMC Teshun LWB 2021 facelift

== JMC Jingma Fuyun EV ==
The JMC Jingma Fuyun EV (江铃晶马福运EV) is a rebadged electric van based on the pre-facelift JMC Teshun sold under the Jiangling Jingma (JMC Jingma) brand from February 2023. The Fuyun EV electric van is powered by a 120 kW (161 hp; 163 PS) electric motor with a maximum output of 320 N⋅m (236 lb⋅ft) with a 85.89 kWh battery supplied by CATL supporting a range of 345 kilometres (214 mi).

== Sales ==
In 2017, around 11,884 vans were sold. In January 2018, 2,923 vans were sold by JMC. Around 10,703 vans were sold in the fourth quarter of 2019.
