= Great Wall Wingle 7 =

Great Wall Wingle 7 (风骏)
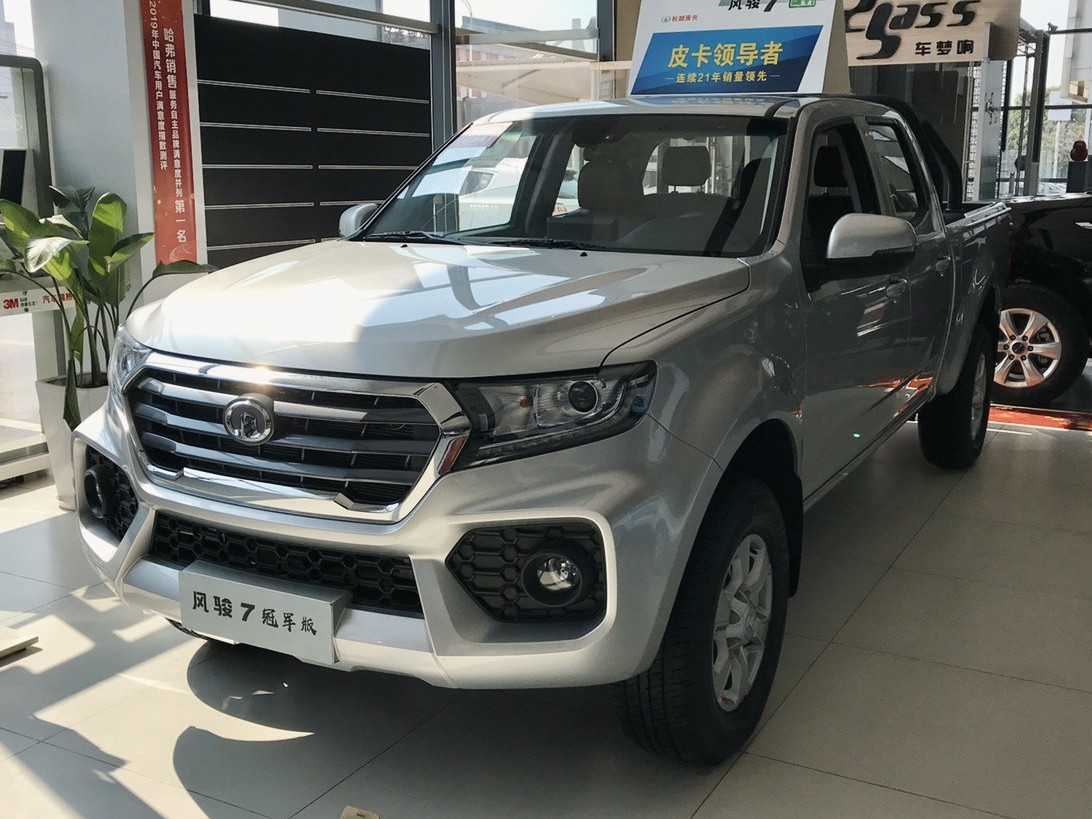

Overview
- Manufacturer: Great Wall Motors
- Production: 2018–present
- Assembly: China: Baoding

Body and chassis
- Class: Full-size pickup truck
- Body style: 4-door crew cab
- Layout: Front-engine, rear-wheel drive Front-engine, four-wheel drive Rear-motor, rear-wheel drive (Electric)

Powertrain
- Engine: 2.0L GW4D20D I4 (turbo diesel); 2.0L GW4C20B (petrol); 2.4L Mitsubishi Sirius I4 (gasoline)
- Electric motor: 201 hp (204 PS) Permanent magnet motor (Wingle 7 EV)
- Power output: 168hp (GW4C20B petrol)
- Transmission: 6-speed manual
- Battery: Ternary Lithium Battery

Dimensions
- Wheelbase: 3,350 mm (131.9 in)
- Length: 5,395 mm (212.4 in)
- Width: 1,800 mm (70.9 in)
- Height: 1,760 mm (69.3 in)
- Curb weight: 2,885 kg (6,360 lb)

The Great Wall Wingle 7 (Chinese: 风骏) is a full-size pickup truck manufactured by the Chinese company Great Wall Motors since 2018.

== Overview ==
The Wingle 7 is equipped with a two-liter 107 kW (143 hp) diesel engine, a six-speed manual transmission and all-wheel drive with a Borg Warner transfer case with a downshift and a forced locking rear differential. The cargo bed dimensions is 1680x1460x480 mm. The pickup itself is almost 5.4 meters long, and its carrying capacity is 975 kg.

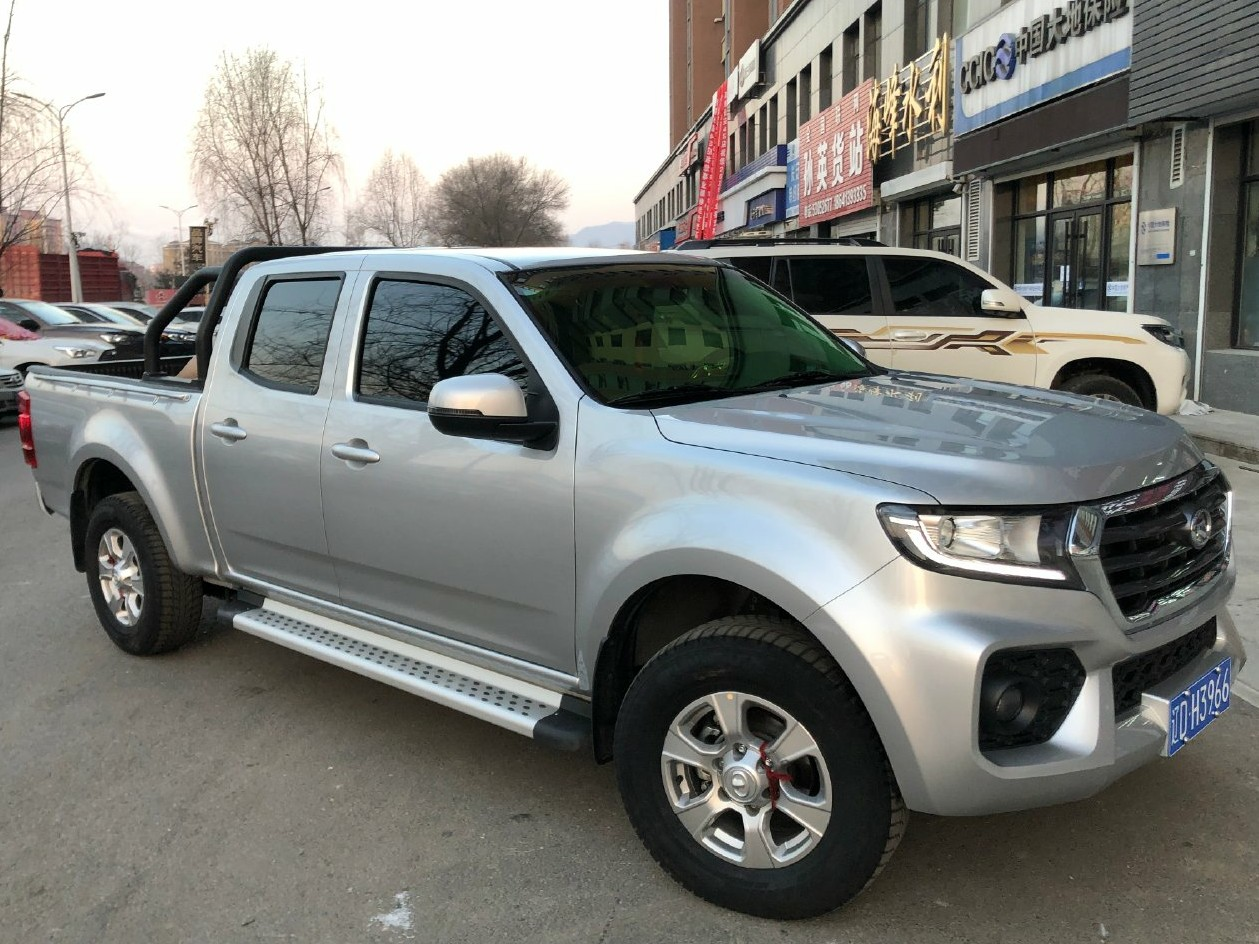
front

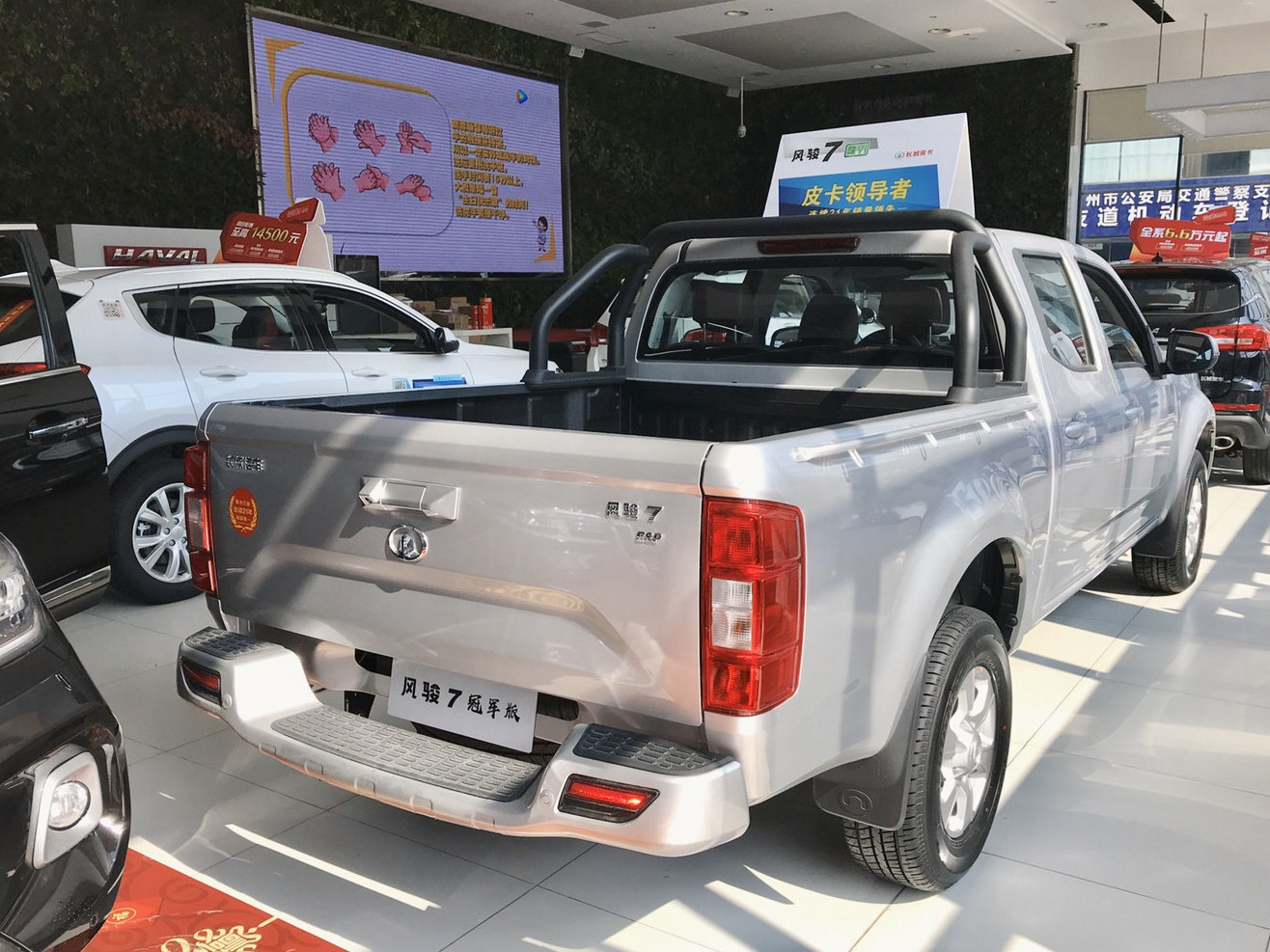
rear

== Wingle 7 EV ==
The Wingle 7 EV was announced by GWM at the 2019 Chengdu Motor Show, claimed to have a 150 kW (201 hp) motor, peak torque of 300 N⋅m (221 lb⋅ft), and a battery capacity of 60kWh.
