= Zotye SR9 =

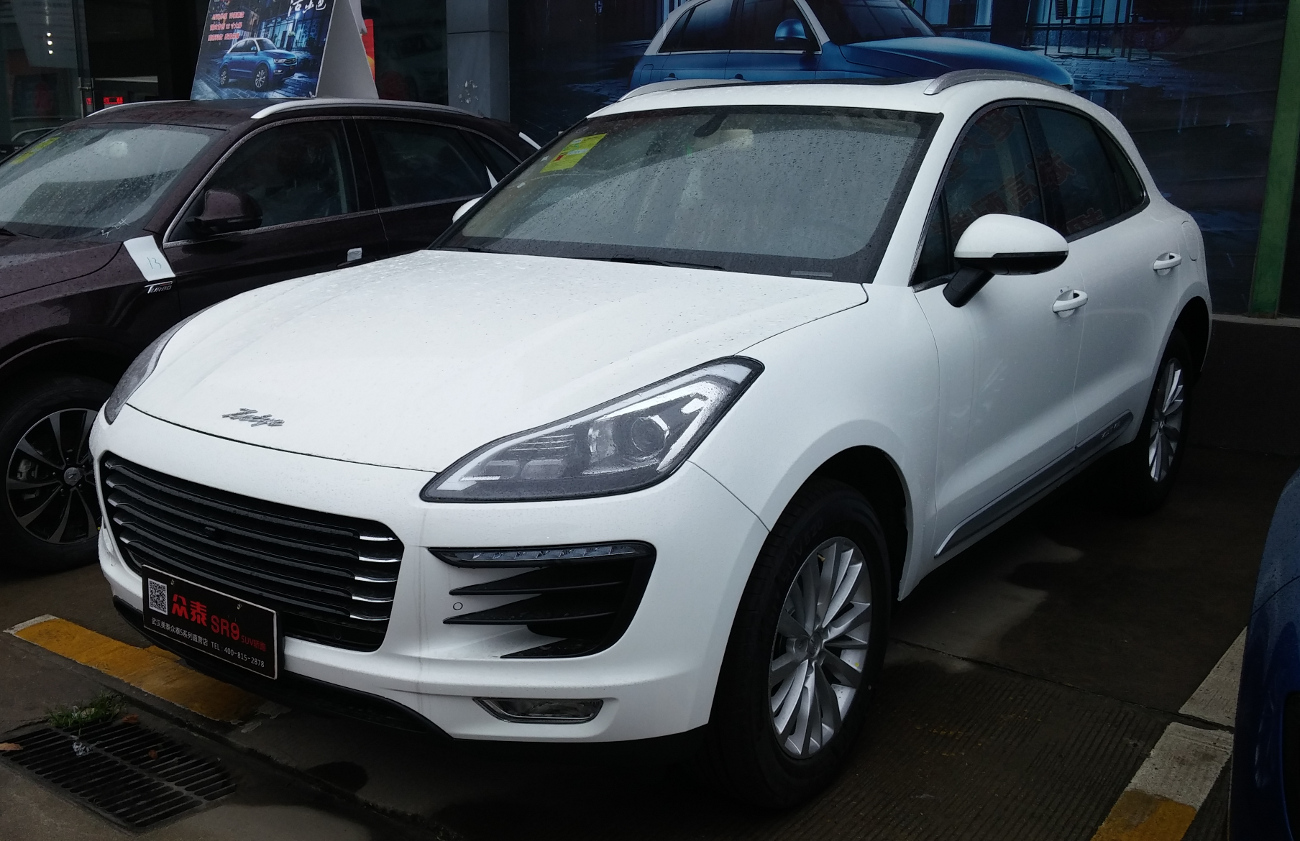

Overview
- Manufacturer: Zotye
- Production: 2016–2019
- Model years: 2017–2019
- Assembly: China

Body and chassis
- Class: mid-size CUV
- Body style: 5-door CUV
- Layout: Front-engine, front-wheel-drive layout

Powertrain
- Engine: 2.0L 4G63 I4 (turbo) (petrol)
- Transmission: 5-speed manual 6-speed DCT

Dimensions
- Wheelbase: 2,850 mm (112.2 in)
- Length: 4,744 mm (186.8 in)
- Width: 1,929 mm (75.9 in)
- Height: 1,647 mm (64.8 in)

The Zotye SR9 is a mid-size CUV produced by Zotye Auto for the Chinese market. The production car debuted in November 2016. Pricing of the SR9 ranges from 109.800 to 162.800 yuan. Just like the previously launched SR7, the SR9 is also a controversial vehicle in terms of styling, because it heavily resembles the Porsche Macan featuring same car size class as an D-segment SUV due to Zotye measuring its body size and dimensions, making it one of the unlicensed copy of a Porsche SUV. The mid-size Zotye SR9 is the second product of the Zotye S-series crossovers following the compact SR7.

== Zotye SR9 HEV ==
The Zotye SR9 HEV is the plug-in hybrid electric vehicle (PHEV) version of the Zotye SR9. Debuted on the 2017 Chengdu Auto Show in August 2017, the hybrid combines the original 190hp 2.0 turbo with an electric motor with an electric-range of 80 kilometers.

== Gallery ==
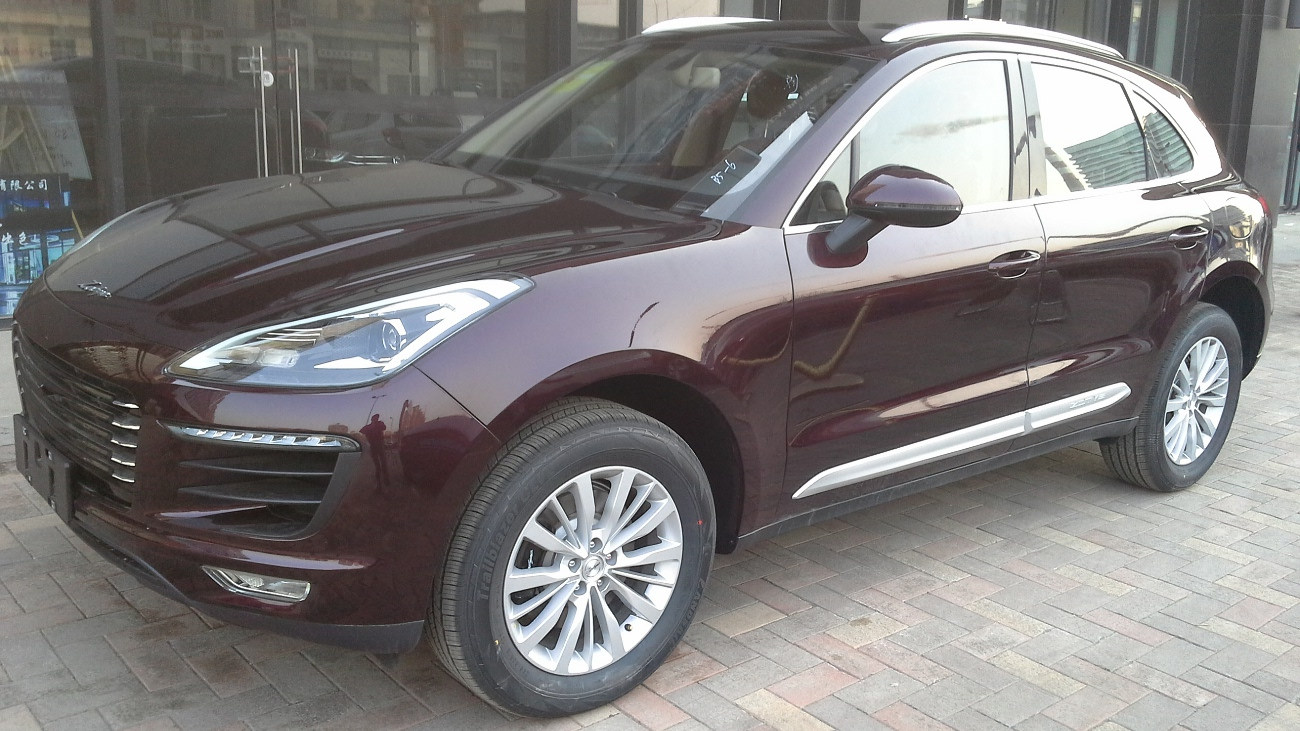
Zotye SR9 front

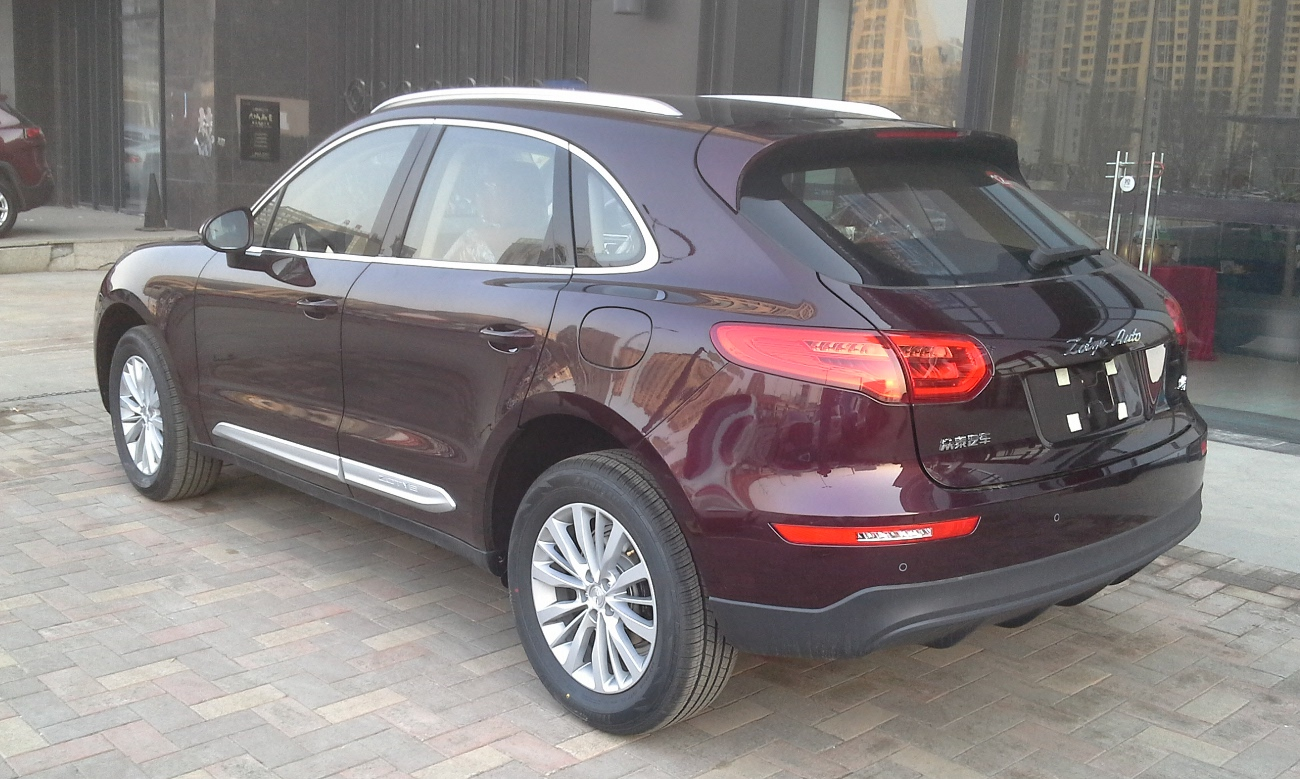
Zotye SR9 rear
