= Mitsubishi Sirius engine =

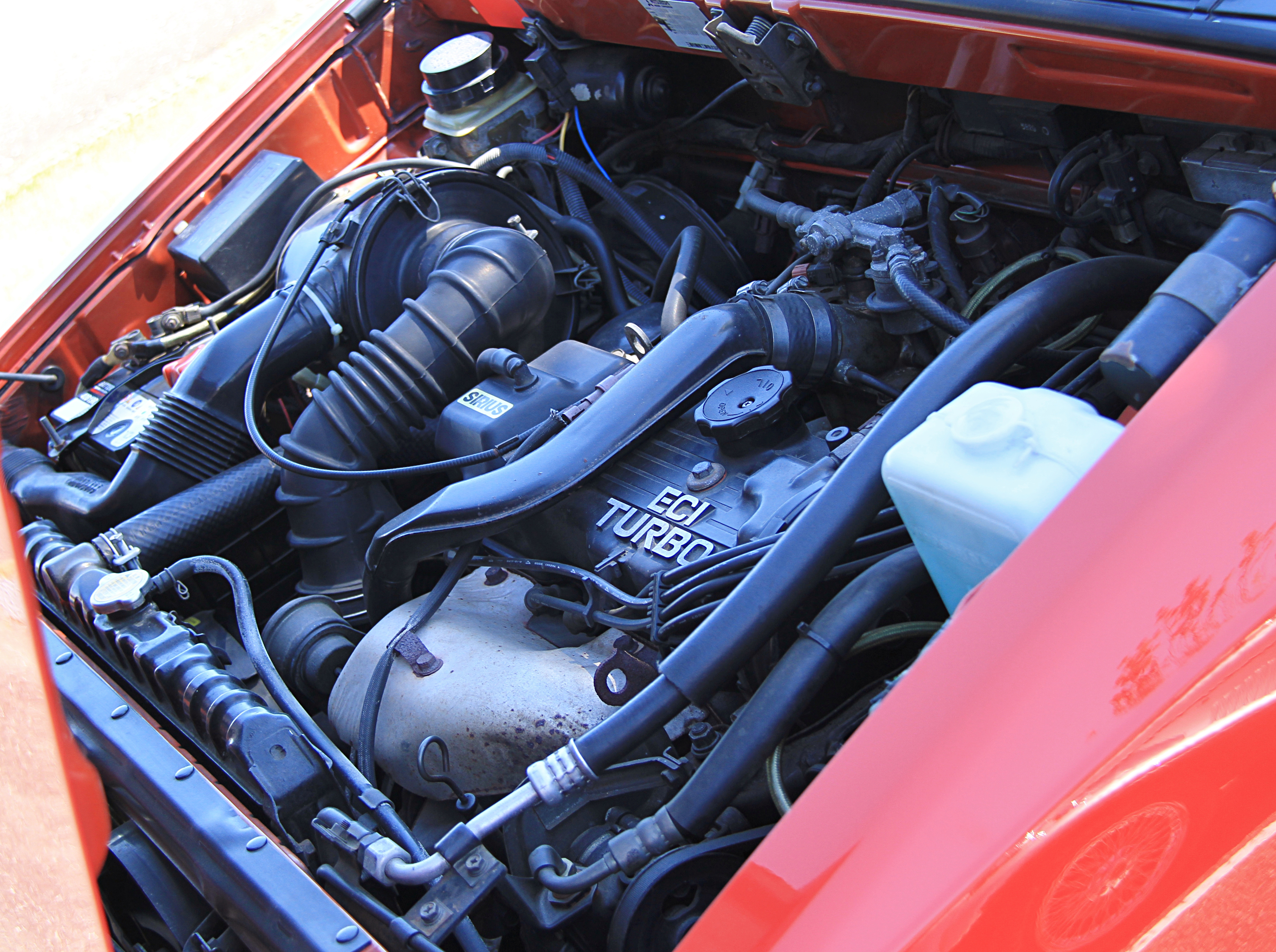
- Mitsubishi G62B engine

Overview
- Manufacturer: Mitsubishi Motors
- Also called: 4G64/4D6
- Production: 1980–2013 (4G6 & 4D6 Series); ~2010–present (4K Series: China)

Layout
- Configuration: Inline-four
- Displacement: 1.6 L; 97.3 cu in (1,595 cc); 1.8 L; 109.5 cu in (1,795 cc); 1.8 L; 112.0 cu in (1,836 cc); 2.0 L; 121.9 cu in (1,997 cc); 2.0 L; 121.9 cu in (1,998 cc); 2.4 L; 143.5 cu in (2,351 cc); 2.4 L; 145.1 cu in (2,378 cc)
- Cylinder bore: 80.6 mm (3.17 in); 81.5 mm (3.21 in); 82.3 mm (3.24 in); 82.7 mm (3.26 in); 85 mm (3.35 in); 86.5 mm (3.41 in); 87 mm (3.43 in)
- Piston stroke: 75 mm (2.95 in); 88 mm (3.46 in); 93 mm (3.66 in); 100 mm (3.94 in)
- Cylinder block material: Cast iron
- Cylinder head material: Aluminium
- Valvetrain: SOHC & DOHC, 2 & 4 valves x cyl. with MIVEC on some versions

Combustion
- Turbocharger: Some versions
- Fuel system: Carburetor, Fuel injection
- Fuel type: Gasoline, Diesel
- Cooling system: Water-cooled

Chronology
- Successor: Mitsubishi 4B1 engine (4G6 Gasoline engine); Mitsubishi 4N1 engine (4D6 Diesel engine)

The Mitsubishi Sirius or 4G6/4D6 engine is the name of one of Mitsubishi Motors' four series of inline-four automobile engines, along with Astron, Orion, and Saturn.

The 4G6 gasoline engines were the favoured performance variant for Mitsubishi. The 4G61T powered the Colt Turbo, while the 4G63T, first introduced in the 1980 Lancer EX 2000 Turbo, became noteworthy as the engine under the hood of the World Rally Championship-winning Lancer Evolution. A UK-market Evo known as the FQ400 had a 400 bhp (298 kW; 406 PS) version of the Sirius, making it the most powerful car ever sold by Mitsubishi. Since the 2010s, updated versions of the Sirius engine equipped with a new head including variable valve timing have been manufactured by Shenyang Aerospace Mitsubishi Motors Engine Manufacturing (SAME) as the 4K series.

The 4D6 diesel engines supplemented the larger 4D5. Bore pitch is 93 mm.

== 4G61 (1.6 liters) ==
The 4G61 displaces 1,595 cc (1.6 L) with bore/ full length stroke of 82.3 mm × 75 mm (3.24 in × 2.95 in). This engine was always DOHC 16-valve and used either Multi-point (MPFI) or Electronic Control (ECFI) fuel injection. A turbocharged version was also produced for the Mirage and Lancer. Unlike the other Sirius motors, the 4G61 does not have balance shafts.

=== Performance ===
- 4G61 105 hp (78 kW; 106 PS) at 6100 rpm.
- 4G61T (USA/Canada only) 135 hp (101 kW; 137 PS) at 6000 rpm and 191 N⋅m (141 lbf⋅ft) of torque at 3000 rpm.
- 4G61T (Japan, early) 145 PS (107 kW; 143 hp) at 6000 rpm and 206 N⋅m (152 lb⋅ft) of torque at 2500 rpm.

(late) 160 PS (118 kW; 158 hp) at 6000 rpm and 221 N⋅m (163 lb⋅ft) of torque at 2500 rpm.

=== Applications ===
- 1988–1992 Mitsubishi Mirage / Mitsubishi Colt (MPFI)
- 1988–1992 Dodge Colt / Plymouth Colt
- 1988–1992 Eagle Summit
- 1992–1995 Hyundai Elantra

== 4G62 (1.8 liters) ==
The larger 1.8 L 4G62 was an SOHC 8-valve unit for longitudinal rear-wheel drive and all-wheel drive use. With a bore and stroke of 80.6 mm × 88 mm (3.17 in × 3.46 in), it displaces 1,795 cc (1.8 L). It was available either in carburetor form, multi-point fuel injection, or ECI Turbo as found in the Lancer EX 1800GSR or 1800GT, and Cordia GSR.

=== Applications ===
- 1980–1987 Mitsubishi Lancer EX 1800GSR or 1800GT (A175A)
- 1981–1986 Mitsubishi Delica/L300/Express
- 1983–1987 Mitsubishi Chariot HR
- 1983–1989 Mitsubishi Cordia
- 1983–1989 Mitsubishi Tredia
- 1984–1988 Mitsubishi Galant/Eterna

=== 4G62T ===
Turbocharged version of the 4G62

== 4G63/G63B (2.0 liters) ==
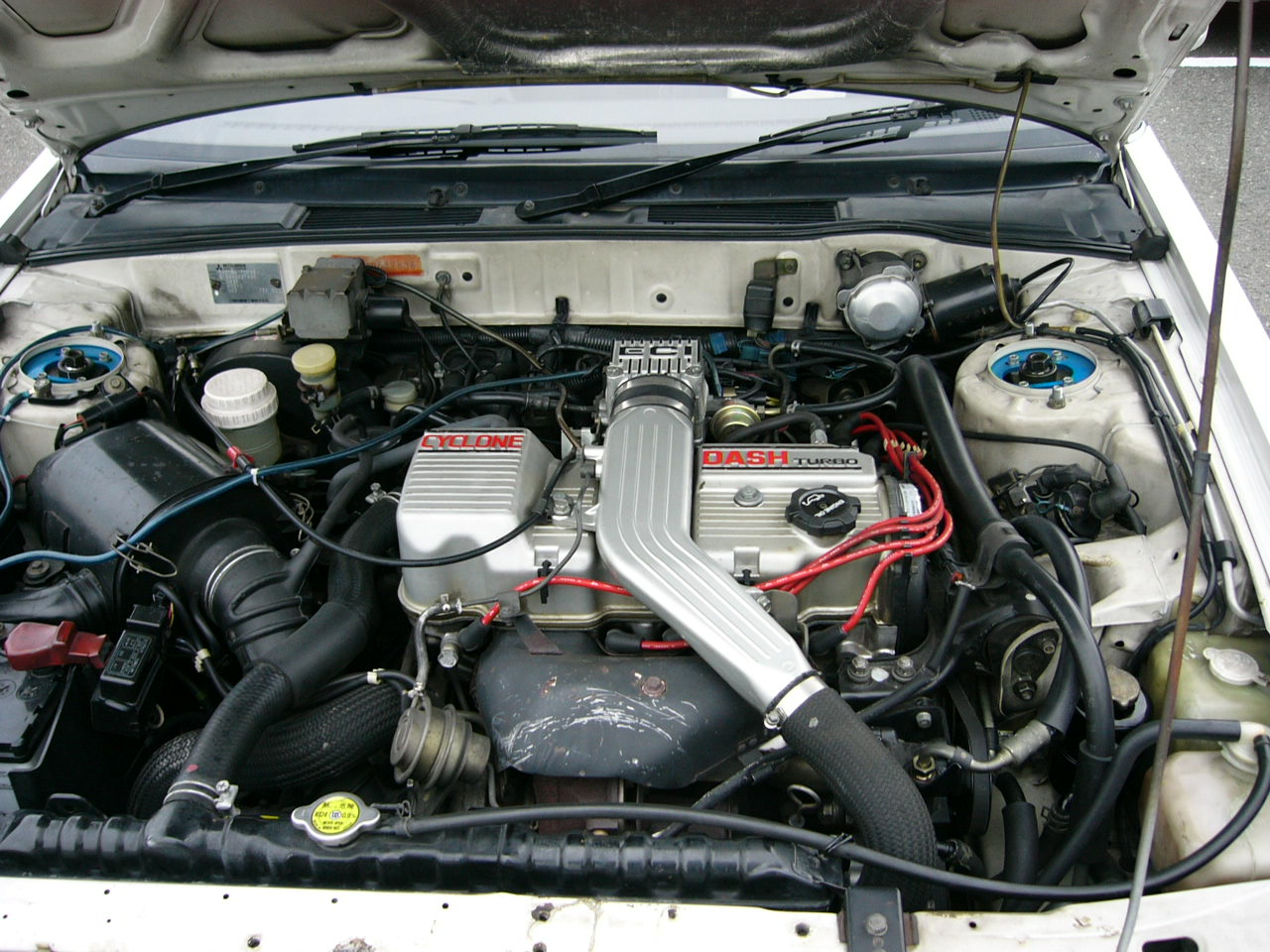
4G63B Cyclone Dash 3x2 in a fifth generation Galant

The 4G63 was a 1,997 cc (2.0 L) version.

Bore x stroke is 85 mm × 88 mm (3.35 in × 3.46 in) SOHC and DOHC were produced. Both versions were available in either naturally aspirated and turbocharged form. For front-wheel drive applications, the turbocharged Sirius' name was changed to "Cyclone Dash". As fitted to the fifth generation Galant 200 PS (147 kW; 197 bhp) JIS gross were claimed — the output claims later shrank to 170 PS (125 kW; 168 bhp) — for the turbocharged and intercooled "Sirius Dash 3x2 valve" engine. This version could switch between breathing through two or three valves per cylinder, to combine high top-end power with low-end drivability as well as allowing for economical operation. It was a modification of Mitsubishi MCA-Jet technology which used a secondary intake valve to inject air into the engine for more efficient emissions control. The DOHC version was introduced in 1987 in the Japanese market Galant, and came in turbocharged or naturally aspirated form. It is found in various models including the 1988–92 Mitsubishi Galant VR-4, the U.S. market 1990-1999 Mitsubishi Eclipse, and the Mitsubishi Lancer Evolution I–IX. Later versions also received Mitsubishi's variable valve timing system, MIVEC.

A SOHC carbureted eight-valve version (engine code G63B) was also available in Mitsubishi's pickup trucks (L200, Strada, Mighty Max, Dodge Ram 50) from the eighties until the mid-nineties. It produces 92 hp (69 kW; 93 PS) at 5500 rpm in European trim (1989). The SOHC version was also used in Mitsubishi Galant models until 1993. It has 76 kW (102 bhp; 103 PS) of output and 157 N⋅m (116 lbf⋅ft) of torque at 4,750 rpm.

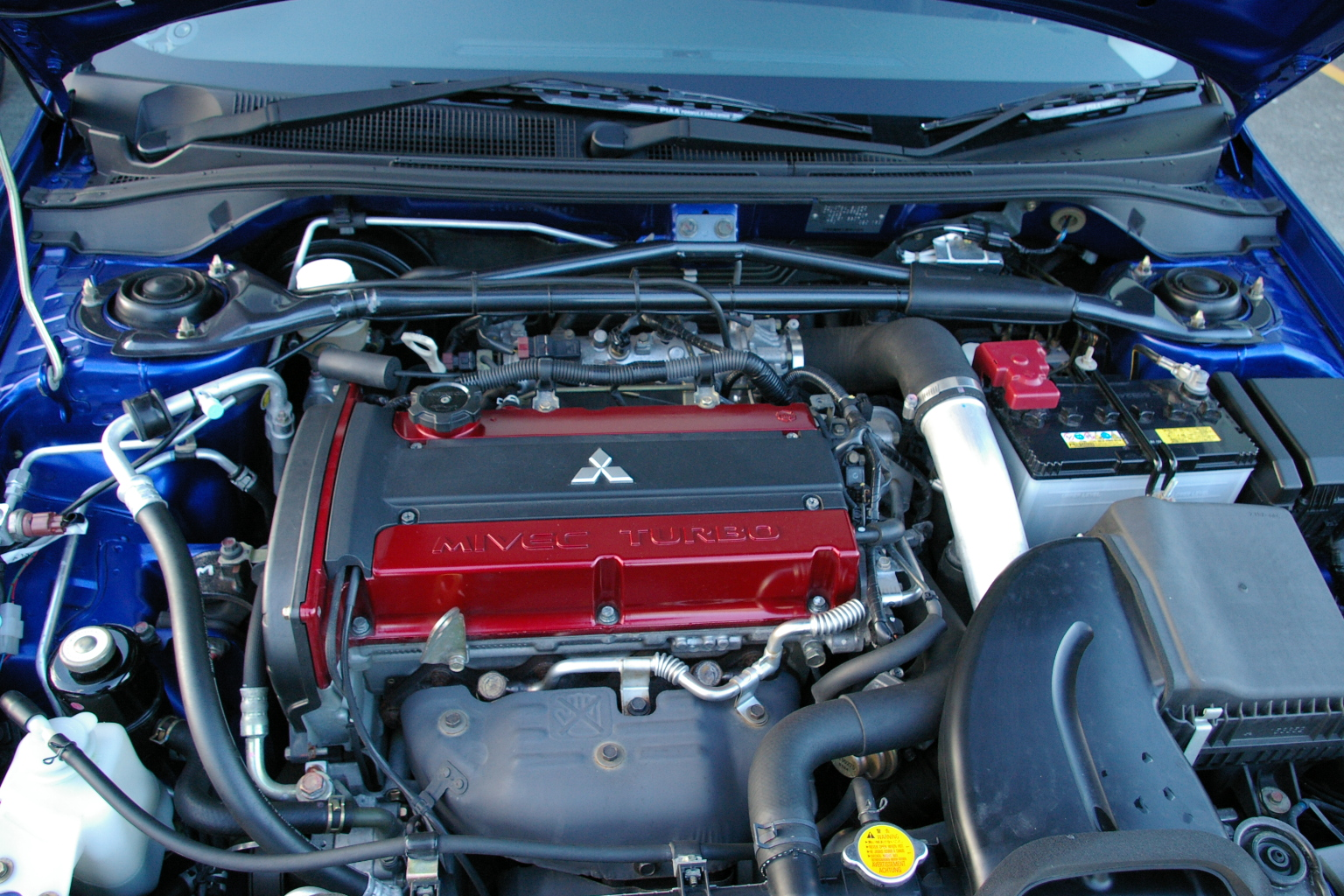
Mivec Turbo 4G63 in a Lancer Evo IX

Also, a SOHC version was produced until the late 90s and early 2000s and was used in Mitsubishi cars like the Montero and the 2.0 L 2-door Pajero with an output of 101 kW (137 PS; 135 bhp) at 4700 rpm. The N33 and N83 Space Wagons and Galant (UK and Philippine market) received the 4G63 in single-cam sixteen-valve format, with the Philippine variant outputs varying between 114 hp (85 kW; 116 PS) at 5500 rpm and 137 hp (102 kW; 139 PS) at 6000 rpm. A similar version, with 100 PS (74 kW; 99 bhp), was also used in some light duty Mitsubishi Canters from 1997 on.

The Mitsubishi Eclipse, Eagle Talon and Plymouth Laser introduced the DOHC turbocharged intercooled version to the U.S. in 1989 through Diamond Star Motors, a joint venture between Mitsubishi Motors and the Chrysler Corporation. From 1990 to late April 1992 came thicker connecting rods and the use of six bolts to secure the flywheel to the crankshaft; May 1992 to 2006 Evolution versions have lighter rods and use seven bolts to secure the flywheel to the crankshaft. They are referred to as the "six bolt" and "seven bolt" engines, respectively.

Output for the 2003 US Mitsubishi Lancer Evolution is 202 kW (271 bhp; 275 PS) at 6500 rpm with 370 N⋅m (273 lb⋅ft) of torque at 3500 rpm. It has a cast iron engine block and aluminium DOHC cylinder head. It uses multi-point fuel injection, has four valves per cylinder, is turbocharged and intercooled and features forged steel connecting rods. The final version of the engine was found in Lancer Evolution IX. It was equipped with Mitsubishi's variable valve timing system, MIVEC. This version also had a revised turbocharger, extended reach spark plugs, two-piece rings.

A SOHC 16 valve turbocharged version called 4G63S4T is produced by Shenyang Aerospace Mitsubishi Motors Engine Manufacturing (SAME) in Shenyang, China, producing a peak power of 130 kW (174 hp; 177 PS) and a peak torque of 253 N⋅m (187 lb⋅ft) for most applications, and rated 140 kW (188 hp; 190 PS) in some applications. This version is equipped with a TD04 turbocharger.

=== Racing ===
Its turbocharged variant, 4G63T (also sometimes referred to simply as the 4G63), has powered Mitsubishi vehicles in World Rally Championships (WRC) for years in the Lancer EX 2000 Turbo, Galant VR-4, Lancer Evolution, Carisma GT, and Lancer WRC04. It was the powerplant of the Lancer Evolution when Tommi Mäkinen won his four consecutive WRC championships in his Lancer. MHI and T-4 turbos were both used as power for these engines. A 1.7L variant of the 4G63 was also used in a custom made hill-climb a DDR Motorsport DDR Grullón GT4 made by Komvet Racing.

=== Applications ===
- 1980–2003 Mitsubishi Galant
- 1981–1987 Mitsubishi Lancer EX 2000 Turbo
- 1982–1987 Mitsubishi Starion
- 1983–1988 Mitsubishi Cordia
- 1983–1988 Mitsubishi Tredia
- 1983–1992 Dodge Colt Vista
- 1983–1998 Mitsubishi Chariot
- 1983–1989 Mitsubishi L200/Mighty Max
- 1983–1991 Mitsubishi Pajero (L040)
- 1985–1998 Mitsubishi Delica
- 1987–1989 Dodge Ram 50
- 1989–1992 Eagle Vista Wagon
- 1990–1998 Eagle Talon
- 1990–1999 Mitsubishi Eclipse
- 1990–1994 Plymouth Laser
- 1992–2007 Mitsubishi Lancer Evolution
- 1994–1998 Mitsubishi RVR
- 1996–1999 Proton Perdana
- 1997–2000 Mitsubishi Canter
- 1998-2007 Mitsubishi Adventure Mitsubishi Freeca Mitsubishi Jolie
- 1998 Mitsubishi FTO GT300 racecar
- 1999–2005 Mitsubishi Dion
- 2000-2006 Mitsubishi Kuda
- 2001-2014 Mitsubishi Savrin
- 2002–200? Mitsubishi Lancer
- 2003–2005 Mitsubishi Airtrek

Hyundai production - also called Hyundai Sirius engine

- 1987–1988 Hyundai Stellar (engine code G4CP)
- 1992–2005 Hyundai Sonata (engine code G4CP)
- 1998–2003 Hyundai Santamo (engine code G4CP)
- 2000–2008 Hyundai Santa Fe (engine code G4JS)
- 1999-2003 Hyundai Trajet (engine code G4JP)
- 2000–2004 Kia Joice (engine code G4CP)
- 2000–2005 Kia Optima/Magentis (engine code G4JP)

Chinese production

- 2004–2010 Brilliance BS6
- 2006 Brilliance BS4
- 2007–2011 Shuanghuan SCEO
- 2007–2015 Great Wall Coolbear
- 2009–2012 Great Wall Haval H3
- 2009 Landwind X6
- 2011–present Landwind X8 4X2 2.0
- 2011–2013 Emgrand EC8
- 2013–2018 Hawtai Lusheng E70
- 2014–2016 Zotye T600
- 2015 BAW Yusheng
- 2016–2017 Landwind X7
- 2016–2021 Zotye T700
- 2017–2019 Zotye SR9
- 2018 Beijing BJ2022 Brave Warrior

== 4G64 (2.4 liters) ==
The 4G64 is the second largest variant, at 2,351 cc (2.4 L). Early models were 8-valve SOHC, but a later 16-valve SOHC and DOHC version was also produced. All used MPFI and had a bore and stroke of 86.5 mm × 100 mm (3.41 in × 3.94 in). The 4G64 was later also available with gasoline direct injection. Output varies between 155 hp (116 kW; 157 PS) at 5,250 rpm with 163 lb⋅ft (221 N⋅m) of torque at 4,000 rpm in the Mitsubishi L200 and 152 hp (113 kW; 154 PS) at 5,500 rpm with 163 lb⋅ft (221 N⋅m) of torque at 4,000 rpm in the Chrysler Sebring/Stratus. The Chrysler version features fracture-split forged powder metal connecting rods. The DOHC and SOHC 16-valve 4G64 are interference engines, while the SOHC 8-valve 4G64 is a non interference engine. From March 1996 an LPG version with 115 hp (86 kW; 117 PS) at 5,000 rpm was available in the Mitsubishi Canter.

The 4G64 is a very popular engine in China, where it was used on the Changfeng Lièbào, a series of cars based on the Mitsubishi Pajero V20 from 2002 to 2021, and the Soueast Delica based on the Mitsubishi Delica van from 1996 to 2013. The 4G64 engine has been produced by Shenyang Aerospace Mitsubishi Motors Engine Manufacturing (SAME), in Shenyang, China where it was assembled through semi-knockdown kits in August 1998 and complete knockdown kits in September 1999. Regular assembling of the engines commenced in April 2000. The Chinese market Ford Transit and its successor, the JMC Teshun use the 4G64 engine as a standard petrol option unlike the international third generation version which uses regular Ford engines.

=== Applications ===
- 1983–1992 Dodge Colt Vista (AWD only)
- 1986–1998 Hyundai Grandeur
- 1986–2005 Mitsubishi Triton
- 1987–1990 Mitsubishi Sapporo
- 1988–2018 Mitsubishi Delica/Van
- 1989–1991 Hyundai Sonata
- 1990–present Mitsubishi L200
- 1990–1992 Dodge Ram 50
- 1990–1996 Mitsubishi Mighty Max
- 1993–1997 Mitsubishi Chariot
- 1993–2003 Mitsubishi Space Wagon
- 1996–2005 Mitsubishi Eclipse
- 1996–1998 Mitsubishi Magna (codenamed 4G64-S4 and fitted to the TE-TF series)
- 1996–2003 Mitsubishi Galant (GDI, European market)
- 1997–1999 Mitsubishi Montero Sport (North American, ES model)
- 1998–2003 Mitsubishi Space Wagon
- 1999–2005 Hyundai Sonata
- 2000–2005 Kia Optima
- 2000–2005 Mitsubishi Eclipse
- 2001–2004 Dodge Stratus Coupe
- 2001–2006 Hyundai Santa Fe
- 2001 Mitsubishi Airtrek
- 2002–2021 Changfeng Liebao (a series of cars based on the Mitsubishi Pajero V20 from China)
- 2003-2006 Kia Sorento 2.4i Manual
- 2003 Mitsubishi Outlander
- 2004 Brilliance BS6
- 2004-2006 Derways Cowboy
- 2004–2006 Chery Eastar
- 2004–2015 Hyundai Terracan
- 2005–2009 Great Wall Hover (X240 and V240)
- 2005–2009 Shuanghuan SCEO
- 2005 Mitsubishi Zinger
- 2007 Landwind X6
- 2008–2015 Chery V5
- 2006–present Ford Transit/JMC Teshun (Chinese market)
- present Generac 22-27KW Protector QS Generators

=== 4G64T ===
Turbocharged version of the 4G64.

- present Generac 32-38KW Protector QS Generators

== 4D65 (1.8 liter diesel) ==
Known as the "Sirius Diesel", the 4D65 has the same dimensions as the 4G62 1,795 cc (1.8 L). It was available either naturally aspirated or turbocharged (with an air-to-air intercooler), and was used in most Mitsubishi diesel passenger cars in the eighties and beginning of the nineties. It was developed specifically to be transversally installed in front-wheel-drive cars, unlike the preceding 4D5-series which remained in production for commercial vehicles. The 1.8 TD power figures are comparable to those of the 22 percent larger, 2.3 liter 4D55, with more low-down torque and while being much smoother. The cast-iron block was typical for Mitsubishi, but unusual for diesel engines, in being equipped with balance shafts. A number of installations combined this engine with four-wheel-drive.

=== Applications ===
4D65 (naturally aspirated)

- 1983–1987 Mitsubishi Mirage/Colt/Lancer (C14)
- 1985–1992 Mitsubishi Mirage/Lancer Van/Wagon (C14/C34)
- 1987–1991 Mitsubishi Mirage/Colt/Lancer (C64/C74)

4D65T (turbocharged)

- 1983–1989 Mitsubishi Galant/Galant Σ/Eterna Σ (E14)
- 1984–1991 Mitsubishi Chariot/Space Wagon (D09W)
- 1987–1992 Mitsubishi Galant/Eterna (E34)
- 1988–1991 Mitsubishi Lancer (C74, 4WD sedan only)
- 1991–1995 Mitsubishi Lancer/Mirage/Libero (CB7, CD7)

== 4G67 (1.8 liters) ==
The 16-valve DOHC 4G67 displaced 1,836 cc (1.8 L). Bore x Stroke: 81.5 mm × 88 mm (3.21 in × 3.46 in)

=== Applications ===
- 1989–1992 Colt/Lancer 1.8 GTI (C58A/C68A)
- 1989–1992 Mitsubishi Galant/Eterna (E35A)
- 1993–1995 Hyundai Elantra, this engine was called G4CN by Hyundai

== 4D68 (2.0 liter diesel) ==
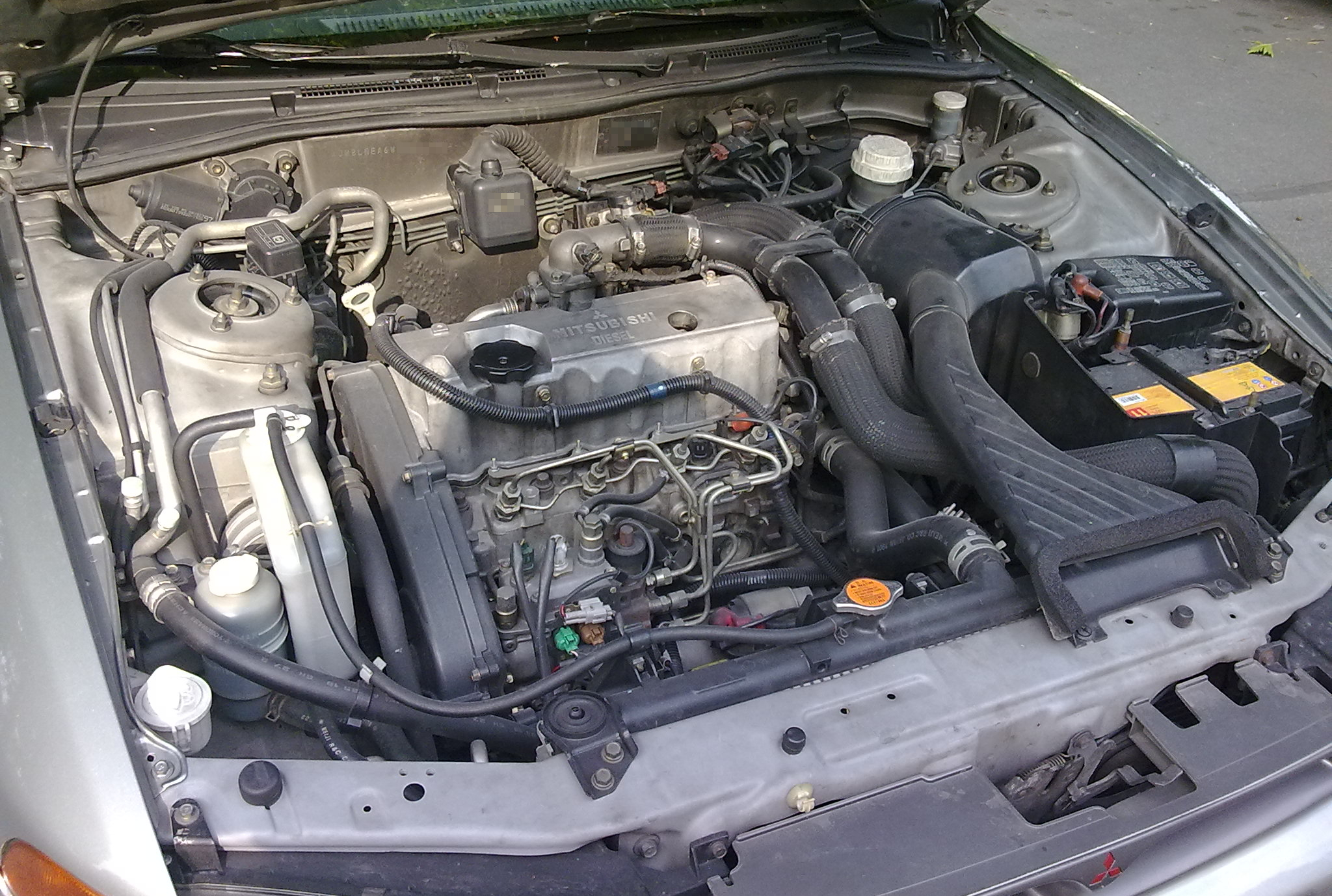
Mitsubishi 4D68 engine mounted in a 1998 Galant Station Wagon (Legnum)

Known as the "Sirius Diesel", the 4D68 version displaces 1,998 cc (2.0 L). It is fitted with a 93 mm (3.66 in) stroke crankshaft and the cylinder bore diameter is 82.7 mm (3.26 in). This engine uses pistons with a static compression ratio of 22.4:1 and piston pins are 25 mm (0.98 in) OD. It was available either naturally aspirated or turbocharged, and replaced the 4D65 as Mitsubishi's "go-to" diesel.

- Type : Diesel engine
- Number of cylinders: inline-four
- Combustion chamber: Swirl chamber
- Lubrication system: Pressure feed, full-flow filtration
- Oil pump type: External gear type
- Cooling system: Water-cooled
- Water pump type: Centrifugal impeller type
- EGR type: Single type
- Fuel system: Electronic control distributor-type injection pump
- Supercharging: Turbocharger
- Rocker arm: Roller type

=== Applications ===
- 1991-1996 Mitsubishi Mirage/Colt
- 1991-1996 Mitsubishi Lancer/Libero
- 1992-1997 Mitsubishi Chariot/Space Wagon
- 1992-1999 Mitsubishi RVR/Space Wagon
- 1996-2000 Mitsubishi Galant/Galant Wagon (Legnum)
- 1996-1999 Mitsubishi Lancer/Libero
- 1997-2002 Mitsubishi Mirage/Colt
- 1995-2000 Proton Wira 2.0D
- 2007-2008 Mitsubishi Triton/L200

== 4G69 (2.4 liters) ==
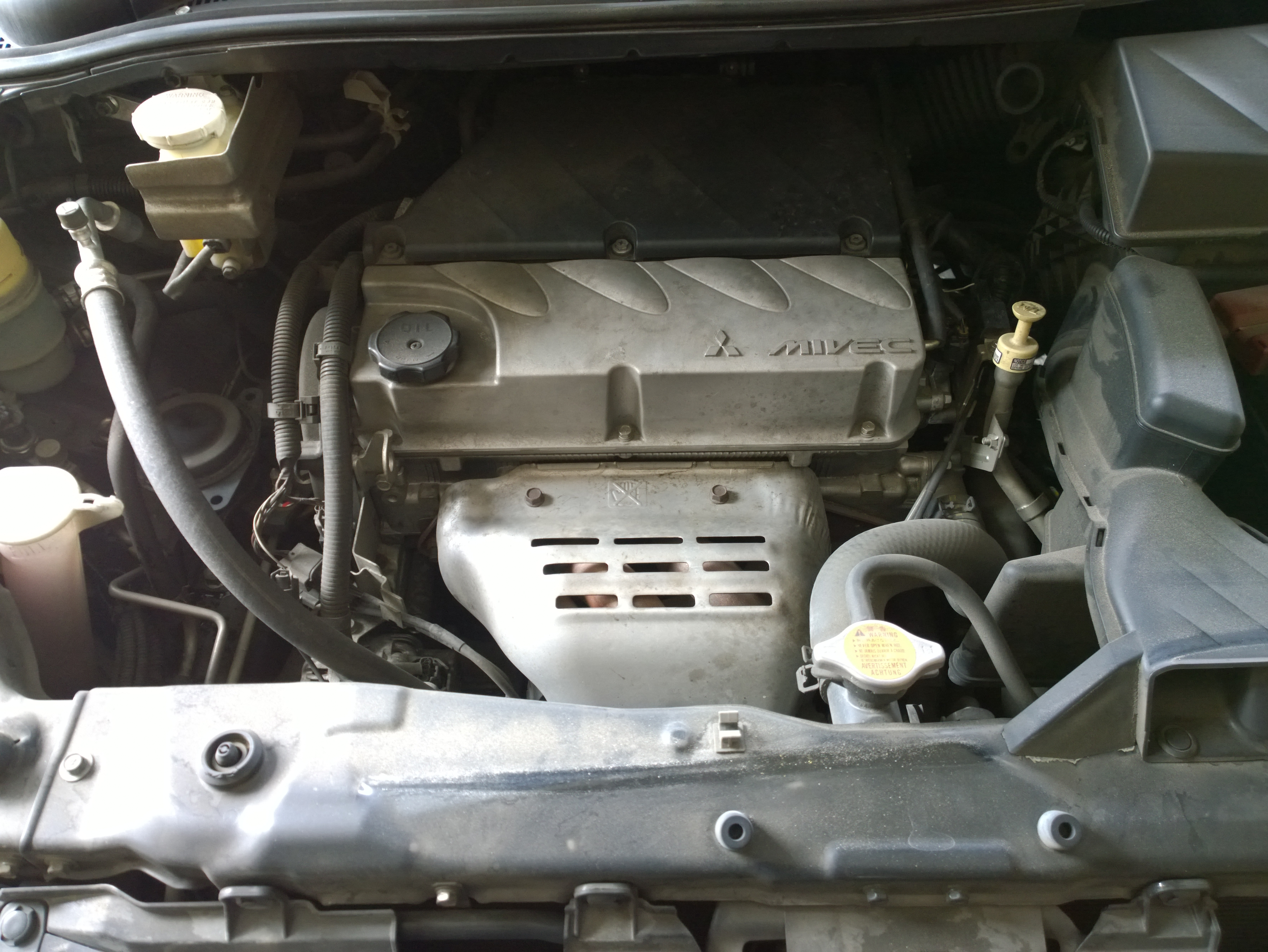
4G69 In Grandis

The 4G69 is a 2,378 cc (2.4 L) version built in Shiga, Japan and Shenyang, China. Bore and stroke is 87 mm × 100 mm (3.43 in × 3.94 in). Output is 120 kW (161 hp; 163 PS) at 5750 rpm (160 in the Sportback Wagon) with 219 N⋅m (162 lb⋅ft) of torque at 3500 rpm. It has a cast iron engine block (later switch to aluminum block) and an aluminum SOHC cylinder head. It uses multi-point fuel injection, has 4 valves per cylinder with roller followers and features forged steel connecting rods, a one-piece cast camshaft, and a cast aluminum intake manifold. The 4G69 incorporates Mitsubishi's MIVEC Variable Valve Timing technology.

Mitsubishi ceased any further development and production of Sirius engine after 2012 model year, and its Chinese joint-venture, Shenyang Aerospace Mitsubishi Motors Engine Manufacturing Co., is now the only one producing 4G69 engines. They are used by Chinese manufacturers only, but have been updated to use an aluminum block while adding a timing chain.

=== Applications ===
- 2003–2008 Mitsubishi Pajero Sport (China)
- 2003–2011 Mitsubishi Grandis
- 2004–2007 Mitsubishi Lancer

NB: From 2005 a slightly detuned version developing 115 kW (154 hp; 156 PS) and 220 N⋅m (162 lbf⋅ft) is used across the entire Lancer range in Australia.

- 2004–2006 Mitsubishi Outlander
- 2004–2012 Mitsubishi Galant
- 2004-2014 Mitsubishi Savrin
- 2006–2012 Mitsubishi Eclipse
- 2008–present Mitsubishi Zinger (automatic models only)
- 2006–2012 Great Wall Wingle 3
- 2007–2010 Great Wall Haval H3
- 2009–2020 Great Wall Haval H5
- 2010–present Great Wall Wingle 5
- 2010–2011 Shuanghuan SCEO
- 2011–2013 BYD S6
- 2012–present JMC Yuhu
- 2011–2014 Emgrand EC8
- Of further note, the Great Wall Haval uses a completely detuned variant offering only 100 kW (134 hp; 136 PS) and 200 N⋅m (148 lbf⋅ft)
- 2014–present Great Wall Wingle 6
- 2009–2015 Great Wall Coolbear
- 2015–2016 Landwind X6
- 2006–2013 Zhongxing Landmark
- 2014–present Maxus G10
- 2019–present CMC Mitsubishi Delica Van/Pickup
- 2019–present Maxus T70

== 4G6A ==
A SOHC 16 valve turbocharged engine similar to 4G63S4T, produced by SAME in Shenyang, China, utilizing a 4G63 shortblock destroked to a displacement of 1.8 L; 109.7 cu in (1,798 cc).

- Displacement: 1,798 cc
- Bore × Stroke (mm): 85 × 79.2
- Compression ratio: 9.4:1
- Multi-point intake manifold injection
- Turbocharger model: TD04
- Peak power: 120 kW (161 hp; 163 PS)
- Peak torque: 231 N⋅m (170 lb⋅ft) at 2,500 ~ 5,000 rpm
- Minimum fuel consumption rate: 255 g/kw·h

== 4K1 series ==
The 4K1 New MIVEC series is based on 4G6 shortblock but mated to a redesigned SOHC 16 valve head with VVL and MIVEC technology. Combustion chambers and piston surfaces were re-engineered to improve fuel economy by lowering friction. All 4K1 models are naturally aspirated and are currently produced by SAME in Shenyang, China.

=== 4K10 (1.8 liters) ===
Destroked 4G63 shortblock, same as 4G6A but with the new SOHC MIVEC head.

- Displacement: 1,798 cc
- Bore × Stroke (mm): 85 × 79.2
- Compression ratio: 10.5:1
- Multi-point intake manifold injection
- Peak power: 100 kW (134 hp; 136 PS) at 6,000 rpm
- Peak torque: 170 N⋅m (125 lb⋅ft) at 4,000 rpm
- Minimum fuel consumption rate: 245 g/kw·h
- No balance shaft

=== 4K11 (2.0 liters) ===
Utilized 4G63 shortblock.

- Displacement: 1,997 cc
- Bore × Stroke (mm): 85 × 88
- Compression ratio: 10.5:1
- Multi-point intake manifold injection
- Peak power: 110 kW (148 hp; 150 PS) at 6,000 rpm
- Peak torque: 190 N⋅m (140 lb⋅ft) at 4,000 rpm
- Minimum fuel consumption rate: 245 g/kw·h
- Optional balance shaft

=== 4K12 (2.4 liters) ===
Utilized 4G69 shortblock.

- Displacement: 2,378 cc
- Bore × Stroke (mm): 87 × 100
- Compression ratio: 10.5:1
- Multi-point intake manifold injection
- Peak power: 120 kW (161 hp; 163 PS) at 6,000 rpm
- Peak torque: 225 N⋅m (166 lb⋅ft) at 4,000 rpm
- Minimum fuel consumption rate: 245 g/kw·h
- Standard balance shaft

All 4K1 models are available for both longitudinal and transverse applications.

== 4K2 series ==
In 2017, Mitsubishi launched a new series of gasoline inline-four engines called the 4K2 series. Originally consisting of three models, 4K20, 4K21 and 4K22, they are available in naturally aspirated as well as turbocharged versions. This new design is based on the 4G6 shortblock, mated to a newly designed DOHC 16-valve head with MIVEC technology.

The 4K2 series is also produced by SAME in Shenyang, China.

=== 4K20 ===
Destroked 4G63 shortblock, same as 4G6A but with the new DOHC head. Only available as a turbocharged model (4K20D4T).

- Displacement: 1,798 cc
- Bore × Stroke (mm): 85 × 79.2
- Compression ratio: 9.5:1
- Multi-point intake manifold injection
- Peak power: 128 kW (172 hp; 174 PS) at 5,500 rpm
- Peak torque: 250 N⋅m (184 lb⋅ft) at 2,000 ~ 4,800 rpm
- Minimum fuel consumption rate: 251 g/kw·h
- Optional balance shaft
- Transverse application only

=== 4K21 ===
4G63 shortblock, available as a turbocharged model (4K21D4T) or two naturally aspirated models (4K21D4M & 4K21D4N)

- Displacement: 1,997 cc (4K21D4T & 4K21D4M)
  2,019 cc (4K21D4N)
- Bore × Stroke (mm): 85 × 88 (4K21D4T & 4K21D4M)
  85 × 89 (4K21D4N)
- Compression ratio: 9.4:1 (4K21D4T)
  10.5:1 (4K21D4M & 4K21D4N)
- Multi-point intake manifold injection
- Peak power: 150 kW (201 hp; 204 PS) at 5,600 rpm (4K21D4T)
  110 kW (148 hp; 150 PS) at 6,000 rpm (4K21D4M)
  117 kW (157 hp; 159 PS) at 6,000 rpm (4K21D4N)
- Peak torque: 280 N⋅m (207 lb⋅ft) at 2,000 ~ 4,800 rpm (4K21D4T)
  195 N⋅m (144 lb⋅ft) at 4,000 rpm (4K21D4M)
  201 N⋅m (148 lb⋅ft) at 4,000 rpm (4K21D4N)
- Minimum fuel consumption rate: 250 g/kw·h (4K21D4T)
  242 g/kw·h (4K21S4M)
  244 g/kw·h (4K21D4N)
- Optional balance shaft for naturally aspirated models (4K21D4M & 4K21D4N), standard on the turbocharged model (4K21D4T)
- Longitudinal application only

=== 4K22 ===
4G69 shortblock, available as a turbocharged model (4K22D4T) or a naturally aspirated model (4K22D4M)

- Displacement: 2,378 cc
- Bore × Stroke (mm): 87 × 100
- Compression ratio: 9.6:1 (4K22D4T)
  10.5:1 (4K20D4M)
- Multi-point intake manifold injection
- Peak power: 160 kW (215 hp; 218 PS) at 5,600 rpm (4K22D4T)
  118 kW (158 hp; 160 PS) at 6,000 rpm (4K22D4M)
- Peak torque: 320 N⋅m (236 lb⋅ft) at 2,400 ~ 4,000 rpm (4K22D4T)
  218 N⋅m (161 lb⋅ft) at 4,000 rpm (4K22D4M)
- Standard balance shaft
- Longitudinal application only

=== Applications ===
- 2020 Peugeot Landtrek
- Great Wall Wingle 5
- 2022 Great Wall Wingle 7
- 2018 JAC Shuailing T8
- 2019 ZX Auto Terralord

== 4K3 series ==
=== 4K31 ===
In 2022, Mitsubishi (SAME in Shenyang, China) launched the new generation of in-Line 4 cylinder Turbo supercharged gasoline direct injection engine (TGDI). It also has six technologies, including variable displacement oil pump, double vortex turbocharger, intake and exhaust door timing variable, high compression ratio, lightweight design, mute technology, etc. It is more efficient and more fuel-efficient.

Displacement: 1,997 cc (4K31TD)

- Bore × Stroke (mm): 85 × 88
- Compression ratio: 10.5:1
- Peak power: 168 KW (225 hp, 228 PS)
- Peak torque: 360 N.m

Applications:

- 2022 Zhengzhou Nissan Rich 7 (Pickup Ruiqi 7).
- 2022 Zhengzhou Nissan Palaso/Palasso.
- 2023 Zhengzhou Nissan New Paladin (based on Nissan Terra).

== See also ==
- List of Mitsubishi engines
- Hyundai Sirius engine
- List of engines used in Chrysler products
