= Mitsubishi Debonair =

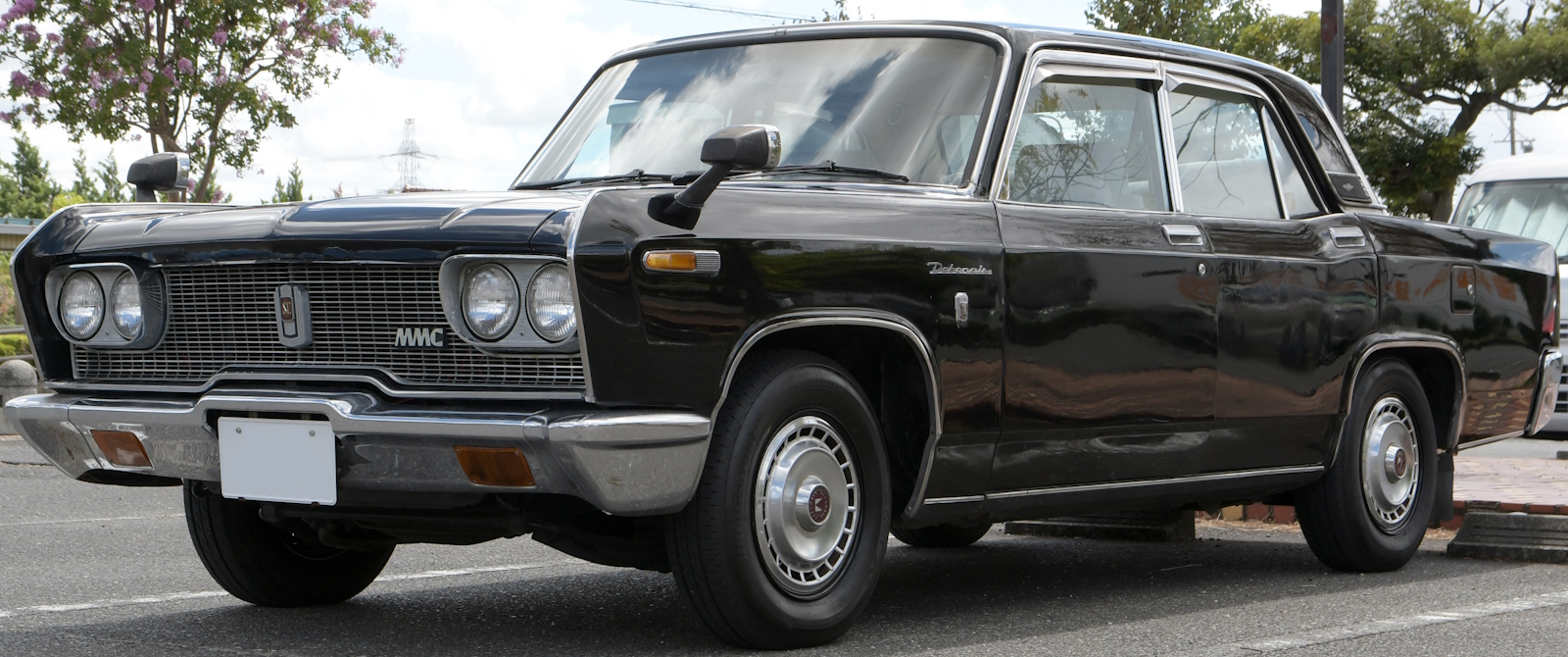
- 1976–1986 Mitsubishi Debonair Executive SE

Overview
- Manufacturer: Mitsubishi Motors
- Production: 1964–1999
- Assembly: Japan: Okazaki, Aichi (Nagoya Plant)

Body and chassis
- Class: Executive car
- Body style: 4-door sedan
- Layout: Front-engine, rear-wheel-drive (1964–1986); Front-engine, front-wheel-drive (1986–1999)

Chronology
- Successor: Mitsubishi Proudia; Mitsubishi Dignity

The Mitsubishi Debonair (Japanese: 三菱・デボネア, Hepburn: Mitsubishi Debonea) is a four-door executive sedan introduced by Mitsubishi Motors in 1964 to serve as their flagship passenger vehicle in the Japanese market. The word "debonair" means gentle, courteous, suave, lighthearted, or nonchalant. Three distinct generations were available during its 35-year production run until it was discontinued in 1999. The first and second generation models were built mainly for senior level executives of the Mitsubishi Group and affiliated companies, essentially a Mitsubishi senior executive company car made by the motor vehicle division of Mitsubishi.

== Overview ==
The Debonair was first introduced at the 10th All Japan Motor Show (later renamed the Tokyo Motor Show) in October 1963. Its appearance at the time was described as "dignified". It was one of the first Japanese-built luxury sedans, using a 2.0-liter six-cylinder engine, with exterior dimensions just under the Japanese government dimension regulations for "compact" vehicles while offering a spacious interior.

At its introduction, it was the largest sedan Mitsubishi had built to date. In Japan, it was sold at a specific retail chain called the Galant Shop starting in 1969 with the introduction of the Galant. At the time of the Debonair's introduction, Mitsubishi had a market reputation of building small, economical sedans, letting other manufacturers build larger, more expensive sedans. The Debonair was seen as a special purpose vehicle, and was not widely marketed towards the general motoring public. Production began in time for the 1964 Summer Olympics held in Tokyo in October 1964.

Three distinct generations were available during its 35-year production run until it was replaced in 1999 with the Proudia in an attempt to continue to offer a top-level luxury sedan. The first and second-generation models were predominantly used by senior level executives of the Mitsubishi Group and affiliated companies. Aside from a very minor export push in the 1960s, the Debonair was mainly sold in Japan, although the second and third generations met with considerable success in South Korean license production.

As a result of the Debonair's perceived primary purpose as a "senior executive vehicle", it did not undergo regular improvements to its exterior appearance, while the mechanicals were routinely updated with the latest advancements as the years progressed. The engine displacement was held to the 2.0-liter limit to minimize the annual road tax bill, and if it could be justified that the car was for business use, the tax liability was further reduced.

== First generation (A30/A31/A32/A33; 1964) ==
First generation (A30/A31/A32/A33)
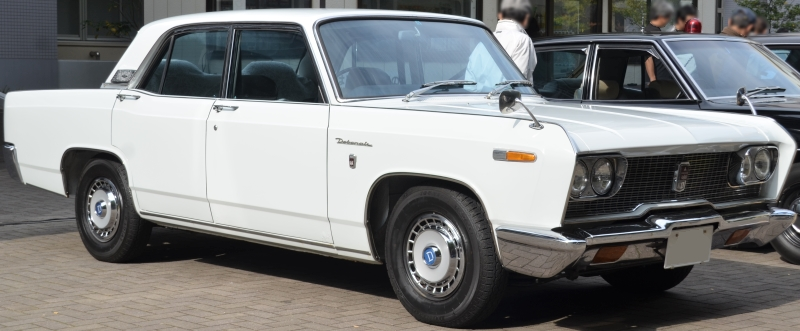
- Debonair Executive

Overview
- Production: 1964–1986
- Designer: Hans Bretzner

Body and chassis
- Layout: Front-engine, rear-wheel-drive

Powertrain
- Engine: Gasoline: 2.0 L KE64 OHV I6 (A30; 1964–1970); 2.0 L 6G34 SOHC I6 (A31; 1970–1976); 2.6 L 4G54/G54B SOHC I4 (A32/A33; 1976–1986)
- Transmission: 4-speed manual (1964–1976); 3-speed Borg-Warner BW-35 automatic

Dimensions
- Wheelbase: 2,690 mm (105.9 in)
- Length: 4,670 mm (183.9 in)
- Width: 1,690 mm (66.5 in)
- Height: 1,465 mm (57.7 in)
- Curb weight: 1,330 kg (2,932 lb)

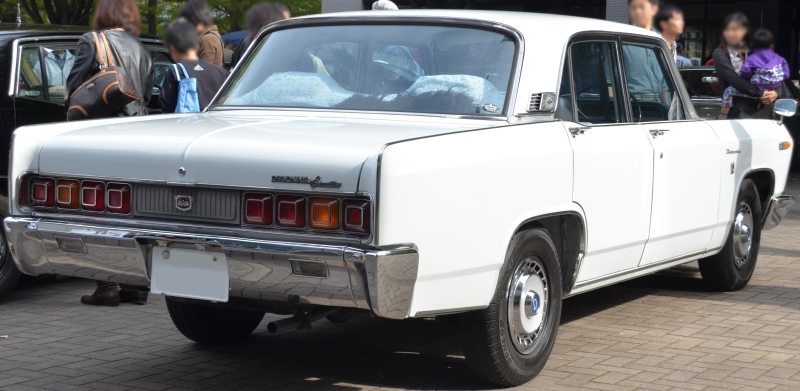
Debonair Executive (A31; 1973–1976, rear view)

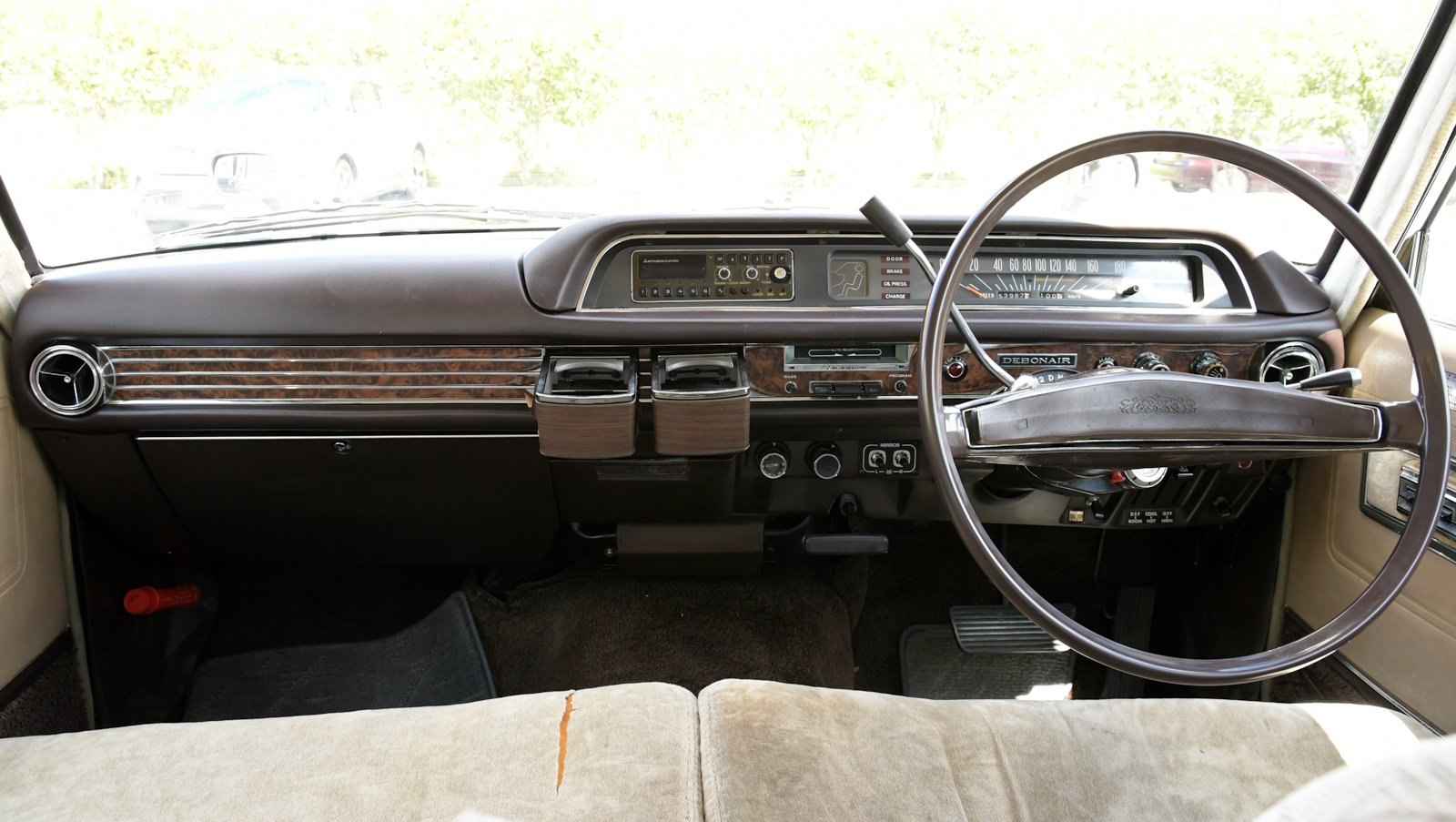
Debonair interior.

The Debonair was Mitsubishi's competitor to the Nissan Cedric, Prince Gloria, Isuzu Bellel and Toyota Crown, and during the first generation's production, the appearance remained generally unchanged from 1964 until 1986, sharing a tradition with the Toyota Century, that being also recognized as a senior executive sedan exclusive to the Japanese market. Although it received several minor redesigns (denoted I through IV), the vehicle proved popular enough in the Japanese market to remain in production for 22 years without major appearance modifications.

The Debonair was largely the result of former General Motors designer Hans S. Bretzner, while the result was largely influenced by the 1961 Lincoln Continental designed by Elwood Engel, as evidenced by the slab-sided body panels, squared wheel wells, extended protrusions at the front of the vehicle, wraparound turn signals in the front, and tapered fins at the rear, with a rear taillight cluster, exhibiting a "Continental-esque" appearance. It used a double wishbone front suspension with leaf springs and a differential for the rear axle for the entire generation.

Powered initially by the KE64 1,991 cc six-cylinder engine with twin carburetors and dual exhausts, the original A30 series developed 105 PS (77 kW; 104 hp) at 5,000 rpm, and had a maximum speed of 155 km/h (96 mph). This engine has overhead valves and a high mounted camshaft (not overhead), similar to Opel's cam-in-head design. The front grille had an "MMC" badge, denoting the newly formed Mitsubishi Motors Corporation. From September 1970 the 6G34 "Saturn 6" (1,994 cc) engine was installed, increasing the engine's power output to 130 PS (96 kW; 128 hp) which gave the car a top speed of 180 km/h (112 mph). From now on, the Debonair was only available in an "Executive" trim package. The badge on the front grille was changed to signify the Saturn engine was installed, and a "MCA-Jet" badge was also included. This model received the A31 model code. In October 1973, the Debonair underwent a facelift: the front turn signals were made smaller and moved upwards on the fenders, the front ventilation windows were deleted, and the L-shaped taillights were replaced by rectangular units. The model code was not changed.

The 1976 model saw the removal of a manual transmission, leaving the only choice of a 3-speed automatic unit, sourced from Borg-Warner. When the 4G54 "Astron" (2,555 cc) four-cylinder engine was introduced June 1976, the trim package was renamed "Executive SE" and the model code became A32. The Debonair received additional technical advancements such as anti-lock braking system in 1979. The badge on the front grille was again changed to signify the engines displacement of "2600" and the "Astron 80" update. These were replaced by "MMC" badges in November 1982.

In April 1978, responding to tightened emissions standards, Mitsubishi introduced a de-smogged model using Mitsubishi MCA and the chassis code was changed to A33.

The first-generation Debonair continued in production until the first quarter of 1986. By the end, its availability was largely academical: in its last full year of production (1985), 205 units were sold in Japan. In total, 21,703 first-generation Debonairs were built in just over 22 years.

== Second generation (S11A/S12A; 1986) ==
Second generation (S11A/S12A)
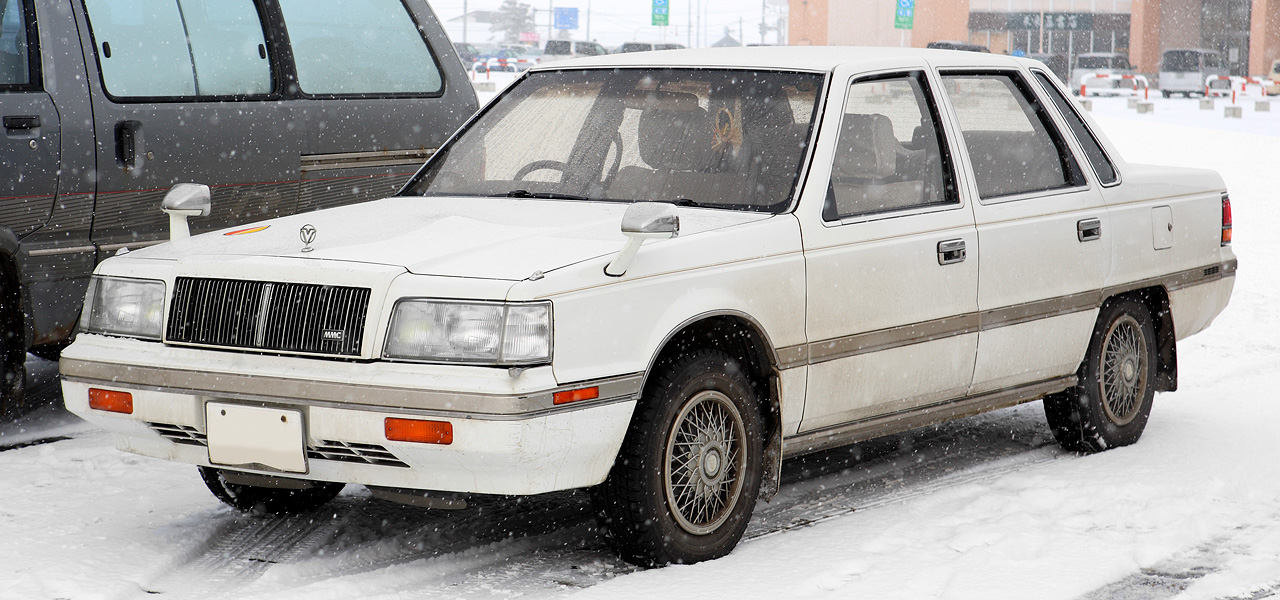
- Debonair V 2.0 Exceed (S11A)

Overview
- Also called: Hyundai Grandeur
- Production: 1986–1992

Body and chassis
- Layout: Front-engine, front-wheel-drive

Powertrain
- Engine: Gasoline: 2.0 L 6G71 SOHC supercharged V6 (S11A); 3.0 L 6G72 SOHC V6 (S12A); 3.0 L 6G72 DOHC V6 (S12A)
- Transmission: 4-speed automatic

Dimensions
- Wheelbase: 2,735 mm (107.7 in) (2.0/3.0 L); 2,885 mm (113.6 in) (Royal 150)
- Length: 4,690 mm (184.6 in) (2.0 L); 4,865 mm (191.5 in) (3.0 L); 5,015 mm (197.4 in) (Royal 150)
- Width: 1,695 mm (66.7 in) (2.0 L); 1,725 mm (67.9 in) (3.0 L)
- Height: 1,425 mm (56.1 in) (2.0 L); 1,460 mm (57.5 in) (3.0 L)
- Curb weight: 1,400 kg (3,086 lb) (2.0 L); 1,620 kg (3,571 lb) (3.0 L)

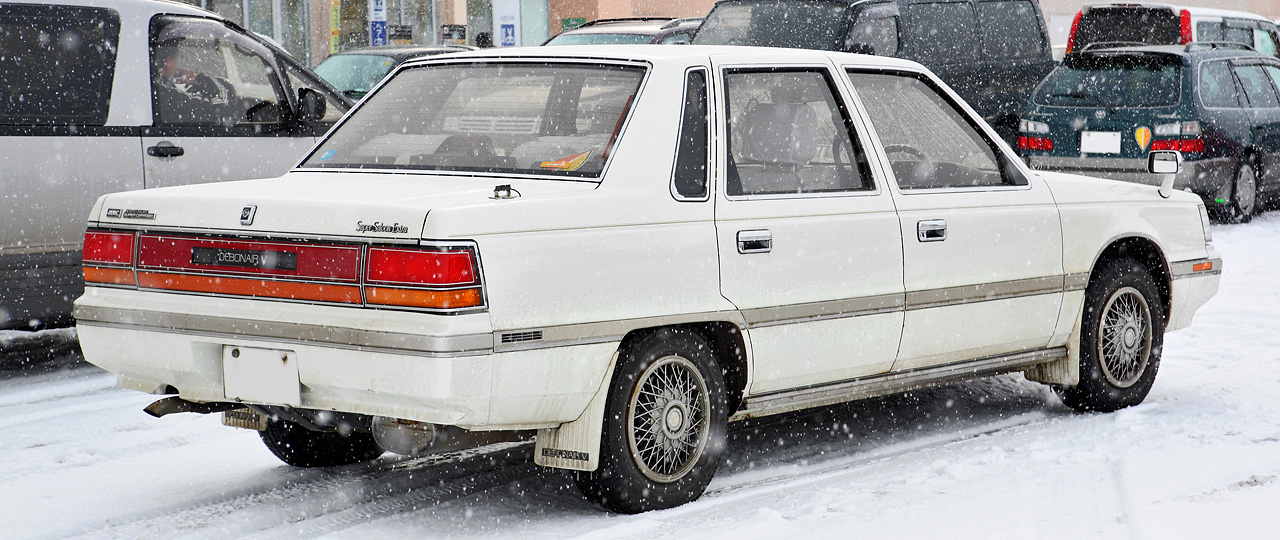
Rear view

In July 1986, Mitsubishi changed the appearance of the Debonair, as its previous version was seen as extremely rare and not a sales leader or image maker of Mitsubishi vehicles. The second-generation Debonair adopted a front-wheel drive layout, a cost-effective way to increase interior space without investing money on engineering in an executive sedan, shared with the E11 Galant. It also came with Mitsubishi's first V6 engines, the 6G71 2.0-liter and the 6G72 3.0-liter under the "Cyclone" moniker, which were shared with the Galant model line later. So as to comply with the Japanese government regulations concerning exterior dimensions and engine displacement, vehicles installed with the 2.0-liter engine were installed in a shorter and narrower body–accomplished by fitting smaller bumpers. Fitted with the 150 PS (110 kW; 148 hp) 3.0-liter V6 engine, the Debonair could reach 195 km/h (121 mph), if it wasn't for the mandatory 180 km/h (110 mph) limiter used in Japanese cars.

The Debonair took advantage of the front-wheel drive layout to allow for more passenger space. The trunk was also designed so as to ensure that two sets of golf clubs could be carried. The Debonair was a reasonable success; sales in its first full year (1987) were 6,230 cars in Japan, compared to 205 by its predecessor in 1985.

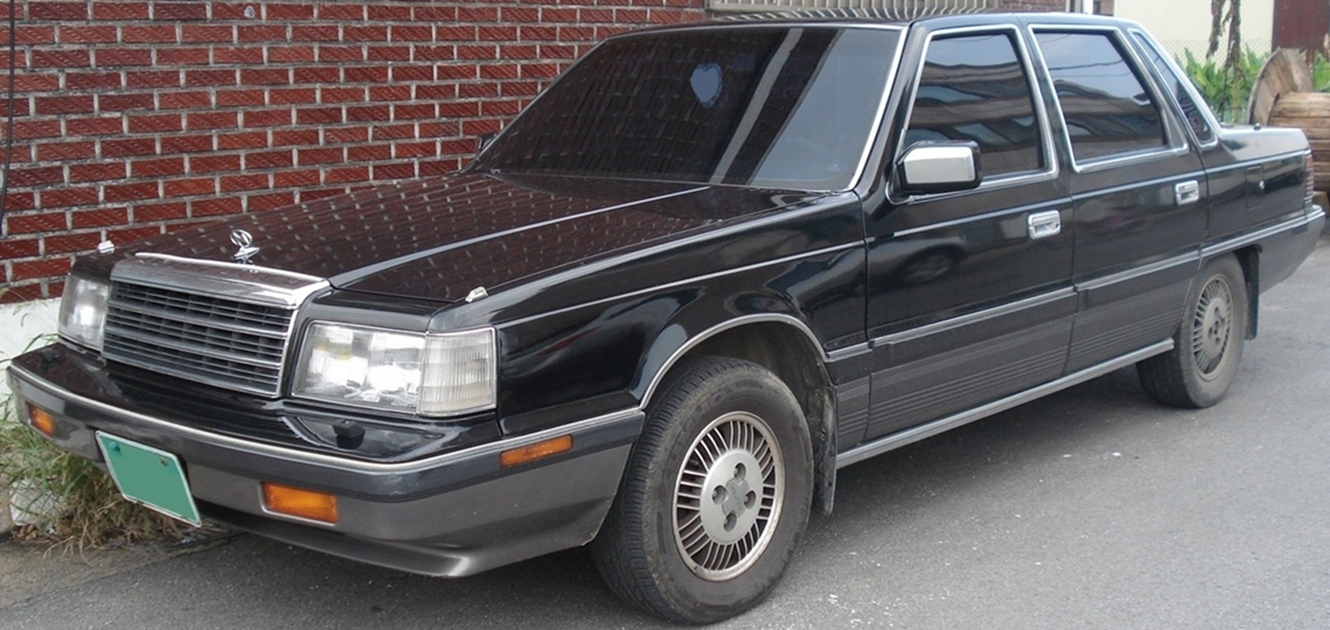
Hyundai Grandeur

A 150 PS (110 kW; 148 hp) supercharged version of the 2.0-liter engine was added to the lineup in February 1987, using the world's first needle roller rocker arm assembly. This generation was badge engineered and was introduced to the Asian luxury car market as the Hyundai Grandeur, giving Hyundai a luxury sedan to shuttle foreign dignitaries during the 1988 Seoul Olympics. As Mitsubishi and Chrysler had a business relationship where automotive technology was being shared and used in both Chrysler and Mitsubishi products, this generation Debonair does have some superficial similarities with the Chrysler New Yorker of the same time period. The Debonair's platform, however, shares nothing with the Chrysler "E", "Y", or "K" platforms. The suspension was upgraded to MacPherson struts for the front suspension, and the rear suspension used a three-link torsion axle. The only transmission available was a four-speed automatic unit.

Unusually for Japan, there was also a full stretch limousine version available briefly, beginning in 1987. These were largely handbuilt by Mitsubishi's Aichi dealership chain and were stretched between the doors by 600 mm (24 in) for a total overall length of 5,465 mm (215 in).

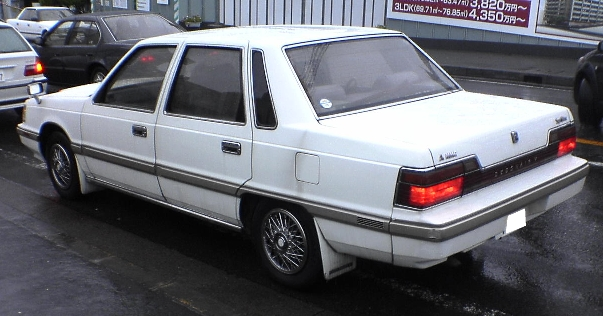
Rear view of a 3.0-liter Debonair V, with the larger "class 5" bumpers

This generation was also the first to install a V6 engine, and the car was called the Debonair V, with a badge on the back of the trunk, and a "V" hood ornament. The name also continued the naming of the various iterations of the previous generation Debonair by Roman numerals I, II, III, and IV, an approach shared with the North American Lincoln Mark series and the Jaguar Mark 1 on a luxury car. The Roman numeral identification approach was also used on Mitsubishi's top-of-the-line sports car, the Starion to identify specific trim packages. In the third quarter of 1989, a twin-cam version of the 3.0-liter V6 engine with four valves per cylinder was introduced, by which time the supercharged 2.0-liter unit was dropped as the regular 2.0-liter engine received a power upgrade. Power for this version jumped from 155 PS (114 kW; 153 hp) to 200 PS (147 kW; 197 hp). This engine became the only option for the AMG version. Top speed for the 24-valve 3.0-liter V6 engine is 215 km/h (134 mph) according to period sources.

In 1990, the Debonair was joined by a newer, more modern looking and sporting executive sedan, called the Diamante (also known as the Sigma) in an attempt to keep Mitsubishi competitive with newer executive sedans, such as the Honda Legend and other Japanese luxury sedans as the Debonair continued to be perceived as dated in appearance. The motivation to introduce a modern looking, executive level luxury sedan also took place in what has become known as the Japanese asset price bubble period that began after the Plaza Accord agreement in 1985.

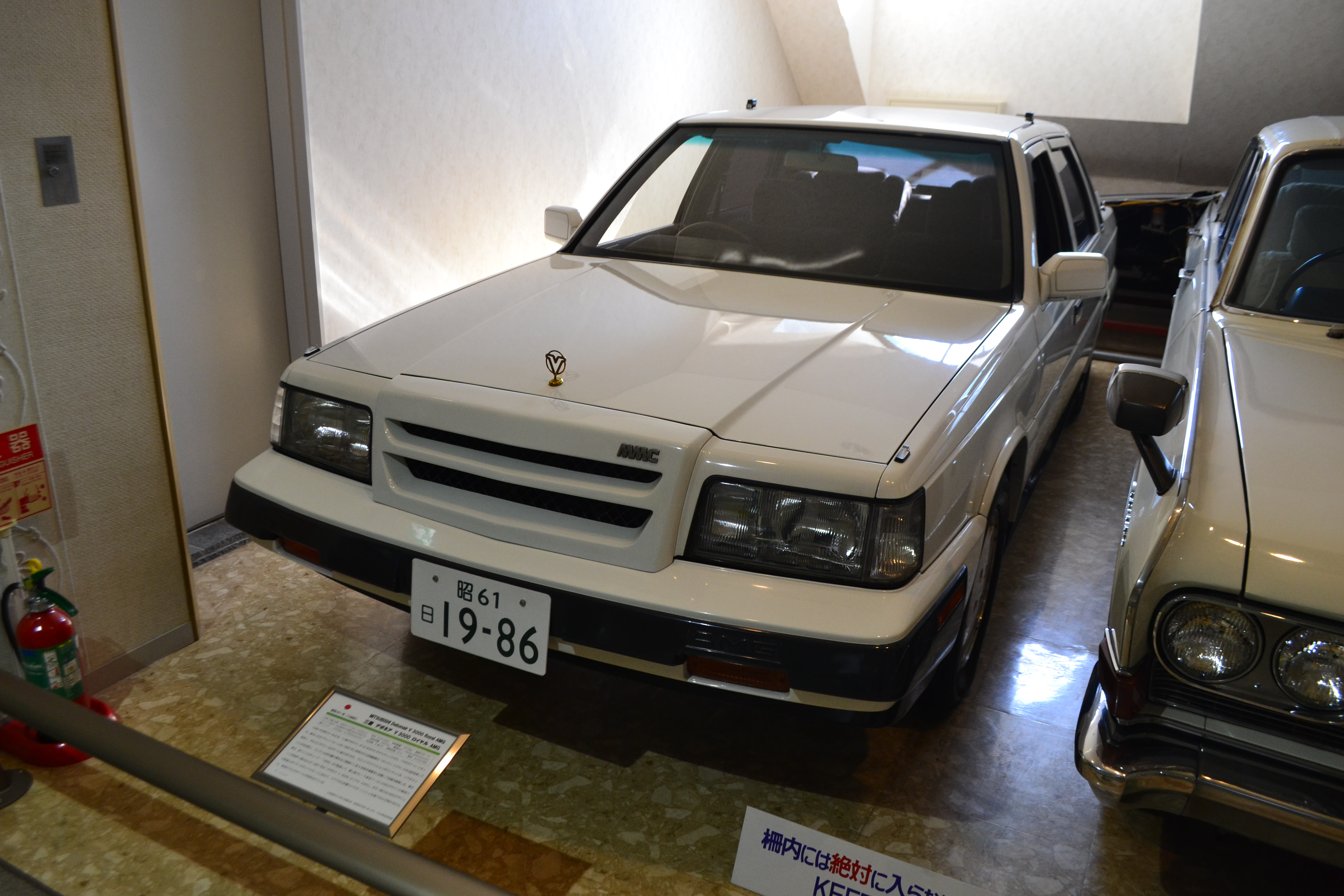
Debonair V 3000 Royal AMG

German tuner AMG was brought in to enhance this version of the Debonair, which primarily consisted of exterior body treatments. The AMG version came in two configurations; the standard length and later the Debonair V 150 AMG, with 150 mm (5.9 in) added to the wheelbase. The "150" limousine (only with the 3.0-liter engine) was first shown in October 1990. In the Japanese crime drama TV show Gorilla, a Debonair AMG is used. British luxury apparel manufacturer Aquascutum was also commissioned to design an exclusive interior appearance package for the Debonair, soon after the company had been purchased by Japanese textile conglomerate company Renown Incorporated; the supercharger was installed optionally with this particular trim package.

Even after the introduction of the more modern Diamante, the Debonair underwent one last facelift, mostly in order to update the passive safety of the car. Along with light cosmetic changes, this took place in May 1991. It included a slight power upgrade for the 24-valve 3.0-liter V6 engine to 210 PS (154 kW; 207 hp). By October 1992, production of the second-generation model had ended as the third-generation Debonair was being introduced.

Second generation engines
type	layout	displ.	output			dates
type	layout	displ.	PS	kW	at (rpm)	dates
6G71	V6, ECI	1998 cc	105	77	5000	1986.07 – / 1989.10
6G71	V6, ECI Multi	1998 cc	120	88	5500	1989.10 – / 1992.10
6G71	supercharged V6 ECI	1998 cc	150	110	5,000	19 / 87.02 – / 1989.10
6G72	SOHC V6 ECI	2972 cc	150	110	5000	1986.07 – / 1989.10
6G72	SOHC V6 ECI multi	2972 cc	155	114	5000	1989.10 – / 1992.10
6G72	DOHC V6 ECI Multi	2972 cc	200	147	6000	1989.10 – / 199 / 1.05
6G72	DOHC V6 ECI Multi	2972 cc	210	154	6000	1991.05 – 199 / 2.10

== Third generation (S22A/S26A/S27A; 1992) ==
Third generation (S22A/S26A/S27A)
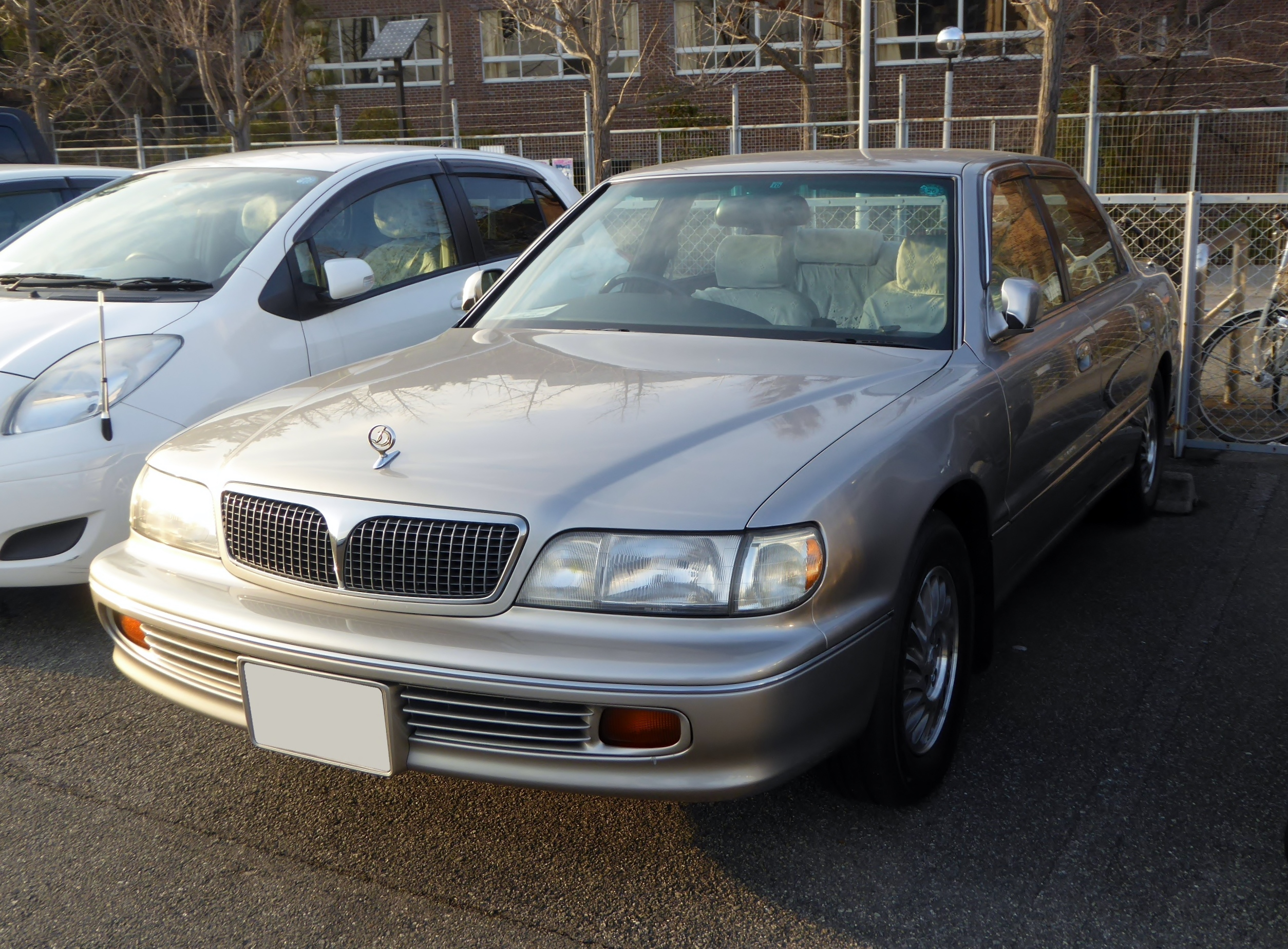
- Debonair Executive I (S22A)

Overview
- Also called: Hyundai Grandeur
- Production: 1992–1999

Body and chassis
- Layout: Front-engine, front-wheel-drive
- Related: Hyundai Dynasty

Powertrain
- Engine: Gasoline: 3.0 L 6G72 SOHC V6 (S22A); 3.0 L 6G72 LPG V6 (S22A); 3.5 L 6G74 DOHC V6 (S26A/S27A)
- Transmission: 5-speed INVECS automatic

Dimensions
- Wheelbase: 2,745 mm (108.1 in); 2,895 mm (114.0 in)
- Length: 4,975–5,125 mm (195.9–201.8 in)
- Width: 1,815 mm (71.5 in)
- Height: 1,440 mm (56.7 in)
- Curb weight: 1,590–1,840 kg (3,505–4,057 lb)

The third-generation Debonair debuted in late 1992, which were longer and wider than its predecessors. The wider range of available engines was topped by a 260 PS (191 kW; 256 hp) 3,496 L 6G74 DOHC V6 engine, and as Mitsubishi's domestic flagship incorporated much of the company's technology. It was introduced after the more mainstream 1990 Diamante.

Some of the technologies used were:

- Four-wheel steering
- Four-wheel anti-lock braking system
- Electronically-controlled suspension
- GPS-guided automotive navigation system
- Rear-focused camera
- Self-closing doors
- Lidar-based distance detection system (Japanese market only). Marketed as "distance warning", this early system only warned the driver about vehicles ahead, without influencing throttle, brakes or gear shifting.
- INVECS 5-speed automatic transmission with traction control system

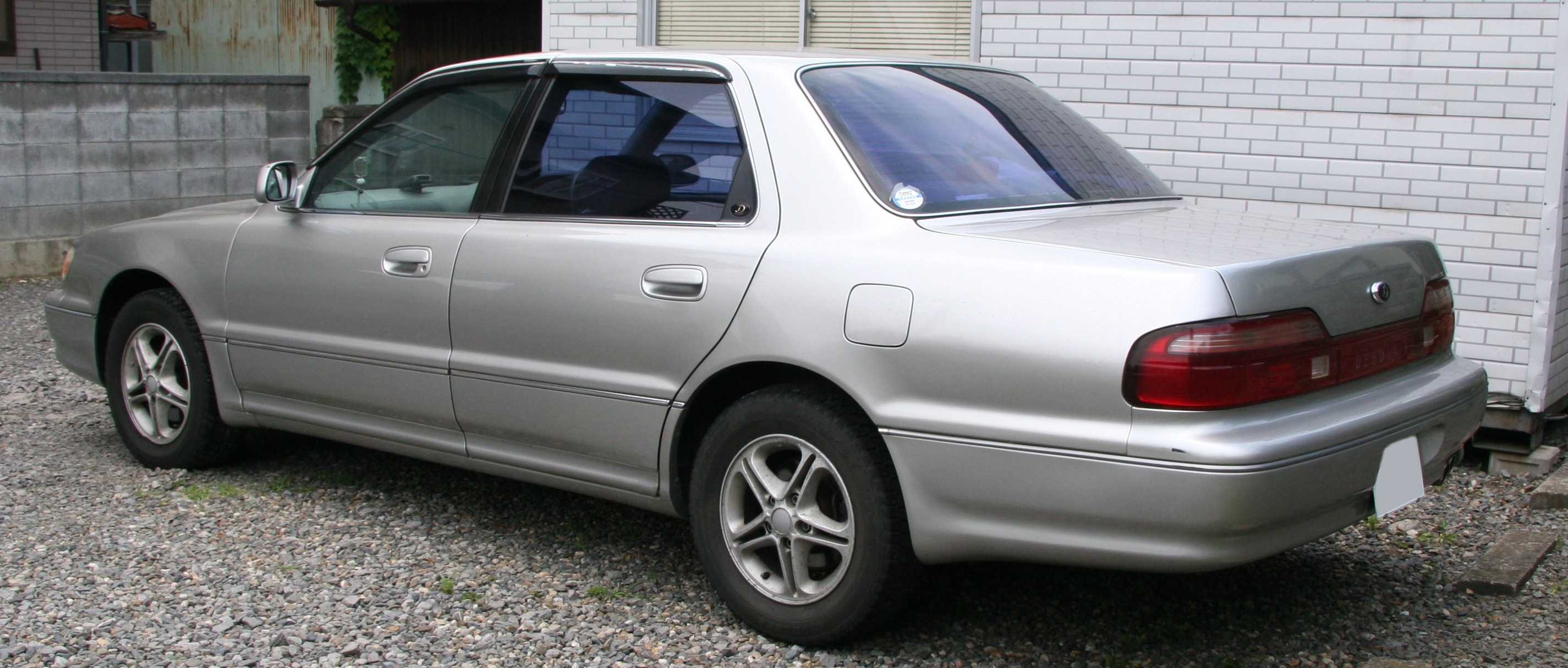
Rear view

In July 1993, a limited edition, long wheelbase model called the Debonair 150 (as it was extended by 150 mm) was added to the lineup. It was only available in a single model with the 3.5-liter V6 engine and the top, Executive III equipment grade. The Debonair 150 was discontinued in September 1994, when the lineup underwent a gentle update and rearrangement. As this generation was Mitsubishi's flagship model, the body style that was compliant with Japanese government regulations concerning exterior dimensions and engine displacement was no longer offered. The rear suspension was upgraded to a multilink setup. Much of the technology installed in this generation Debonair was shared with the GTO/3000GT.

There were a multitude of trim packages with varying levels of equipment. The trim level names started with Executive (I, II, and III), Exceed, Exceed Contega, and Exceed Type A, B, and C. Each model year rearranged the trim level names according to the perceived market conditions.

The Debonair was discontinued in November 1999 and directly replaced by the Proudia. However, Mitsubishi also developed its first V8 engine for the Dignity limousine around this time, and it was this latter model which took position as the domestic flagship of the company.
