= Mitsubishi Proudia =

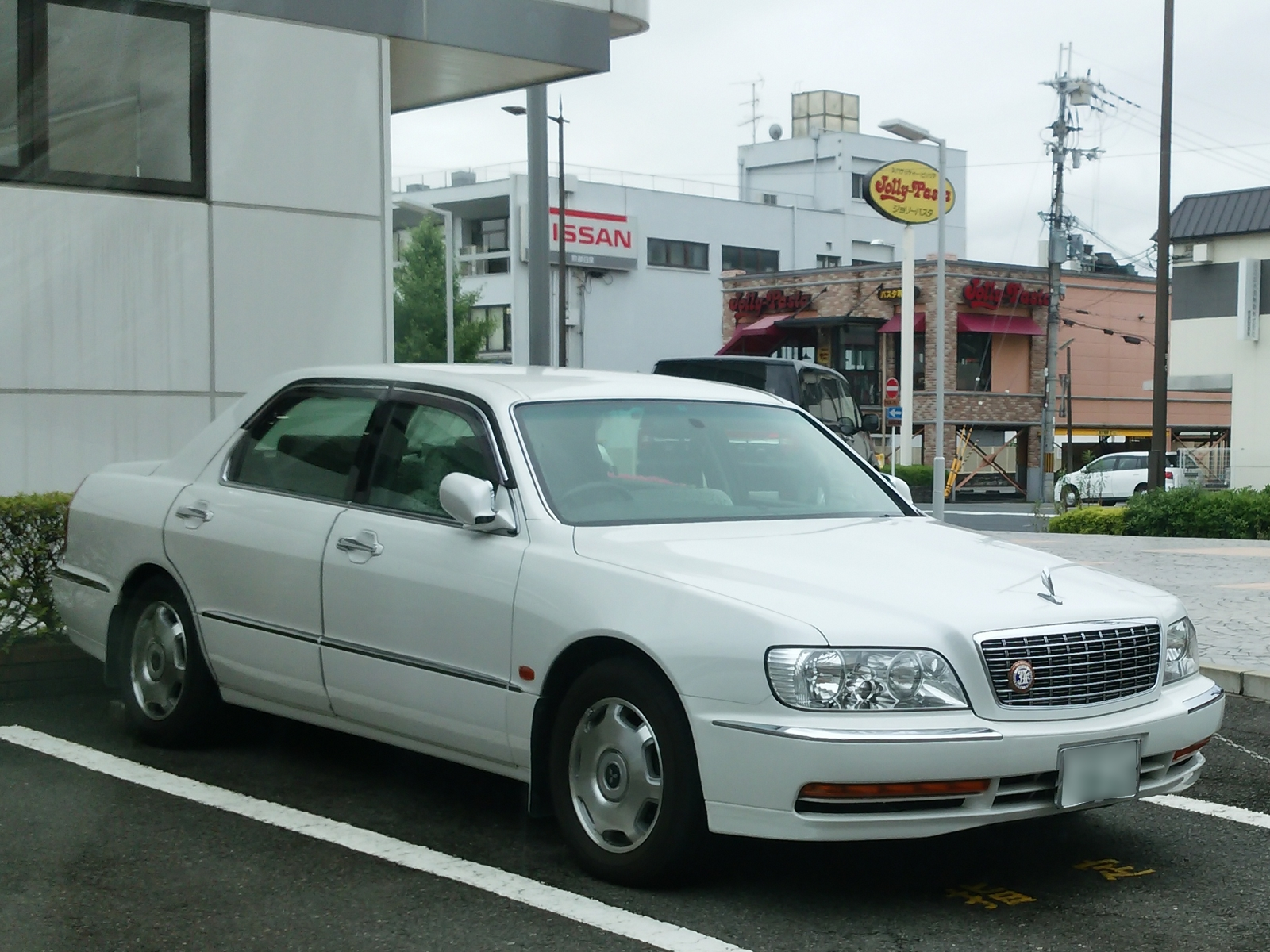
- First-generation Mitsubishi Proudia (S32A)

Overview
- Manufacturer: Mitsubishi Motors (1999–2001); Nissan (2012–2016)
- Production: 1999–2001; 2012–2016

Body and chassis
- Class: Full-size luxury car (1999–2001); Executive car (2012–2016)
- Body style: 4-door sedan
- Layout: Front-engine, front-wheel-drive (1999–2001); Front-engine, rear-wheel-drive (2012–2016); Front-engine, four-wheel-drive (2012–2016)
- Related: Mitsubishi Dignity; Hyundai Equus

Chronology
- Predecessor: Mitsubishi Debonair

The Mitsubishi Proudia (Japanese: 三菱・プラウディア, Hepburn: Mitsubishi Puraudia) is a luxury sedan manufactured by Mitsubishi Motors, positioned below the flagship Dignity limousine (itself a lengthened version of the Proudia) in the company's range. Its name is a portmanteau derived from the English word "proud" and "diamond" (referring to the company's logo). The first generation was produced from late 1999 to 2001, while the second generation (a rebadged second-generation Nissan Fuga) was produced from 2012 to 2016.

== First generation (S32A/S33A; 1999) ==
First generation (S32A/S33A)
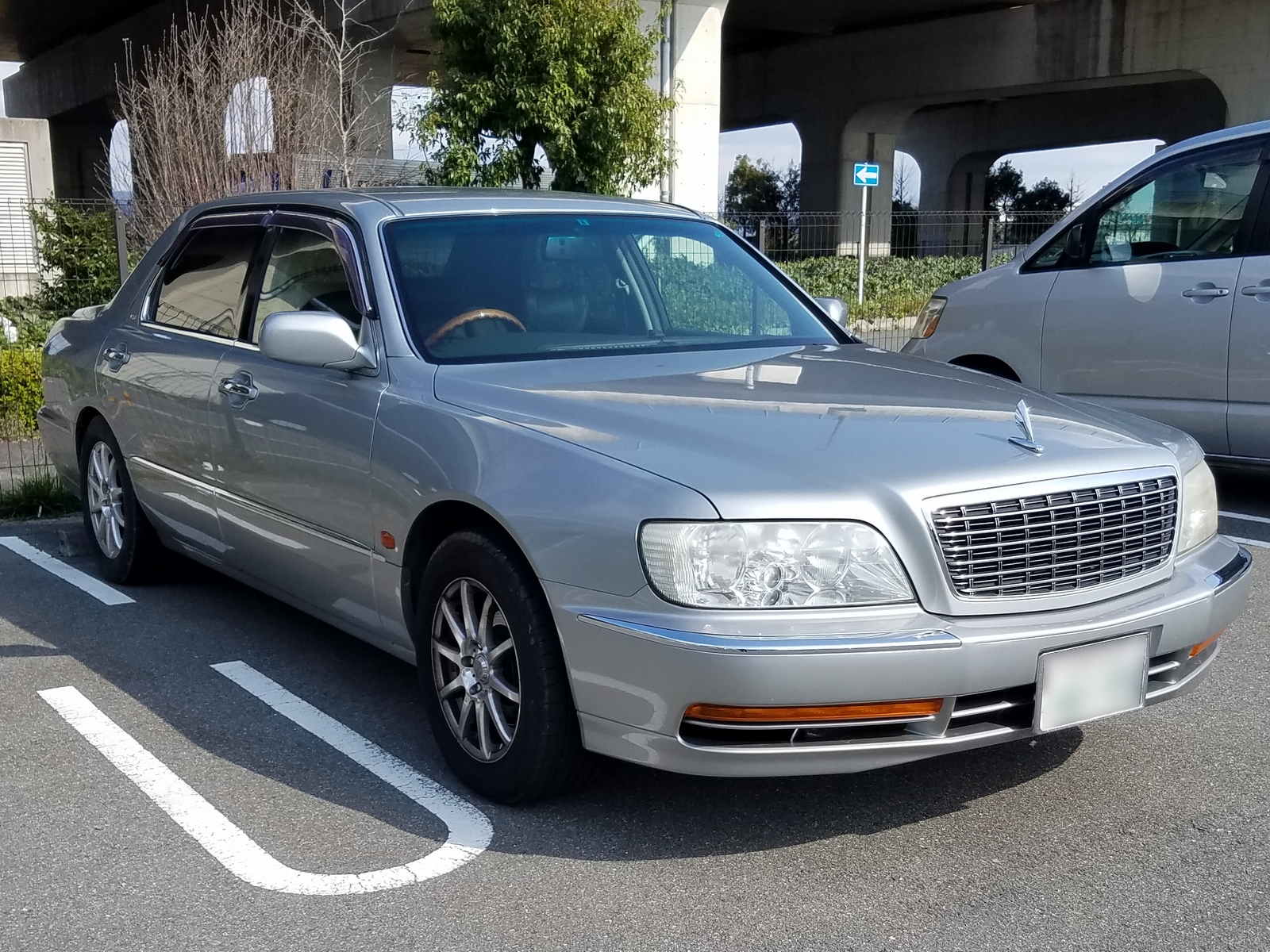

Overview
- Also called: Hyundai Equus
- Production: 1999–2001; 1,227 produced
- Assembly: Japan: Nagoya, Aichi (Ōe Plant)

Body and chassis
- Layout: Transverse Front-engine, front-wheel-drive
- Related: Mitsubishi Dignity (S43A)

Powertrain
- Engine: Gasoline: 3.5 L 6G74 V6 (S32A); 4.5 L 8A80 V8 (S33A)
- Power output: 177 kW (237 hp; 241 PS) (6G74); 206 kW (276 hp; 280 PS) (8A80)
- Transmission: 5-speed INVECS-II automatic

Dimensions
- Wheelbase: 2,830 mm (111.4 in)
- Length: 5,050 mm (198.8 in)
- Width: 1,870 mm (73.6 in)
- Height: 1,475 mm (58.1 in)
- Curb weight: 1,950–2,265 kg (4,299–4,993 lb)

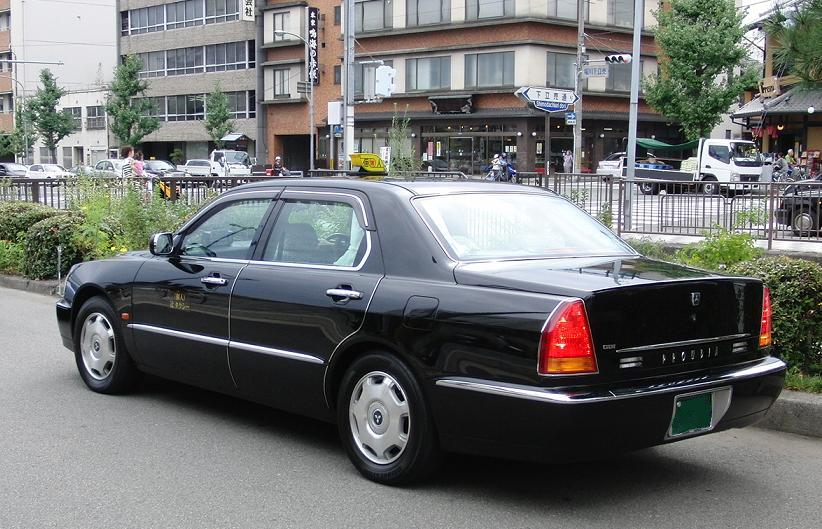
Rear view

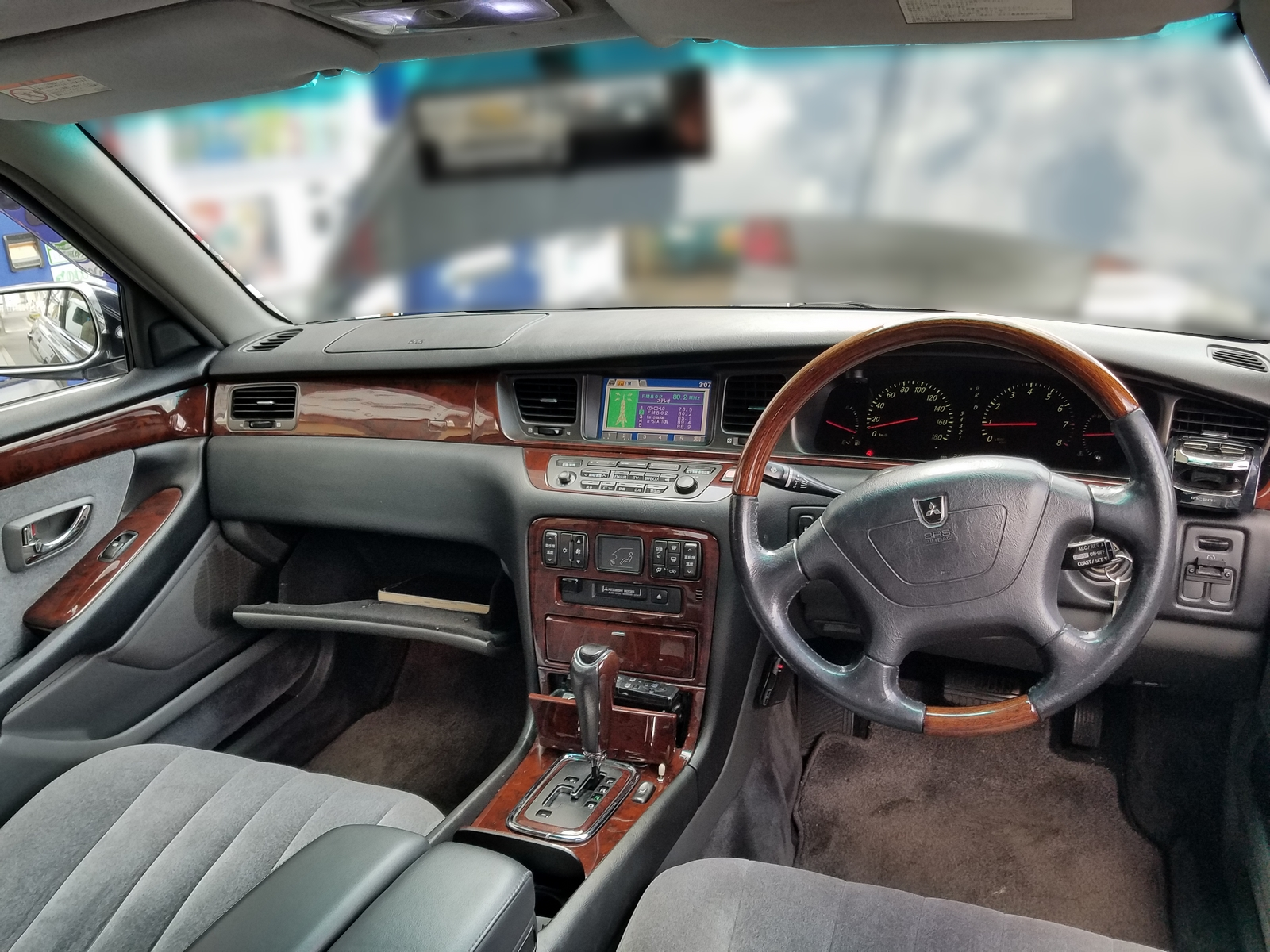
Interior

The Proudia/Dignity range was designed by Mitsubishi Motors and co-manufactured with Hyundai of South Korea, who marketed their own version as the Hyundai Equus from 1999 to 2009. The Proudia was introduced as a competitor to the Nissan Cima and the Toyota Crown Majesta as a full-size luxury car, however Mitsubishi chose to use a transversely installed engine with front-wheel drive.

The Proudia came in three specifications labeled A, B, or C. The A and B types were powered by Mitsubishi's 6G74 3,497 cc GDi V6 engine producing 177 kW (237 hp; 241 PS) at 5,500 rpm and 343 N⋅m (253 lb⋅ft) of torque at 2,500 rpm, while the type C specification was powered by the 8A80 4,498 cc GDi V8 engine producing 206 kW (276 hp; 280 PS) at 5,000 rpm and 412 N⋅m (304 lb⋅ft) of torque at 4,000 rpm. The car was equipped with several features like CCD cameras to monitor adjacent lanes and behind the car, and a lidar activated adaptive cruise control. It used MacPherson struts for the front suspension and a multi-link suspension for the rear wheels.

The Dignity and Proudia's combined volumes fell far shy of Mitsubishi's estimated 300 sales per month, and they were available for only fifteen months from their introduction on February 20, 2000, before Mitsubishi's financial difficulties forced the company to discontinue both models in an effort to streamline its range and reduce costs. Production was discontinued after only 1,227 vehicles were produced during three years. On the contrary, the Equus proved more commercially successful and would remain in production until replaced in 2008.

=== Production and sales ===
Year	Production	Sales
1999	383	-
2000	759	852
2001	85	97 (+1 export)

(Sources: Fact & Figures 2000, Fact & Figures 2005, Mitsubishi Motors website)

== Second generation (BY51; 2012) ==
Second generation (BY51)
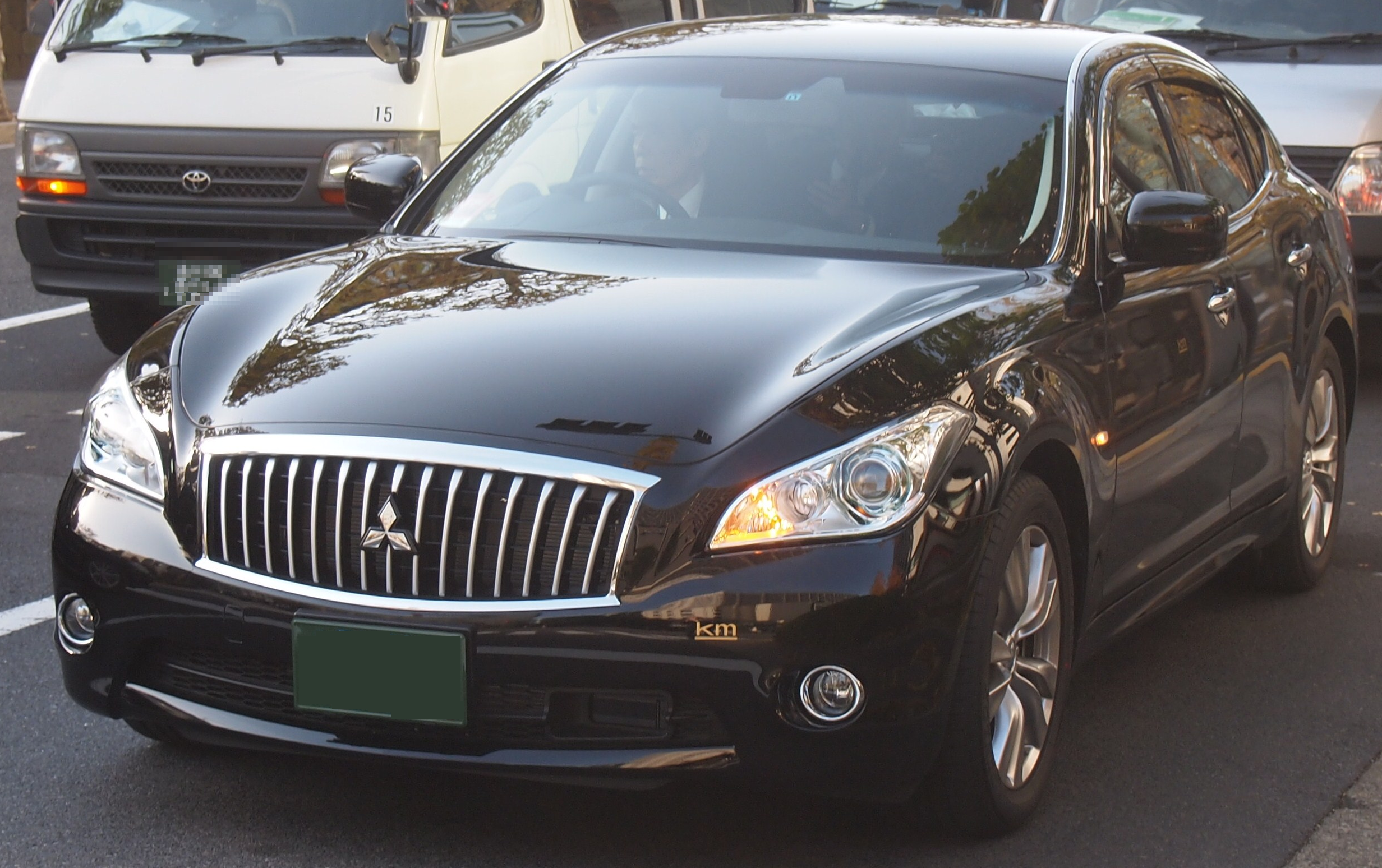

Overview
- Also called: Nissan Fuga/Infiniti M/Q70
- Production: 2012–2016
- Assembly: Japan: Kaminokawa, Tochigi

Body and chassis
- Platform: Nissan FM platform
- Related: Mitsubishi Dignity/Nissan Cima (Y51)

Powertrain
- Engine: Gasoline: 2.5 L Nissan VQ25HR V6 (BY51); 3.7 L Nissan VQ37VHR V6 (BKY51/BKNY51)
- Power output: 165 kW (221 hp; 224 PS) (VQ25HR); 245 kW (329 hp; 333 PS) (VQ37VHR)
- Transmission: 7-speed automatic

Dimensions
- Wheelbase: 2,900 mm (114.2 in)
- Length: 4,945 mm (194.7 in)
- Width: 1,845 mm (72.6 in)
- Height: 1,500 mm (59.1 in)
- Curb weight: 1,720–1,820 kg (3,792–4,012 lb)

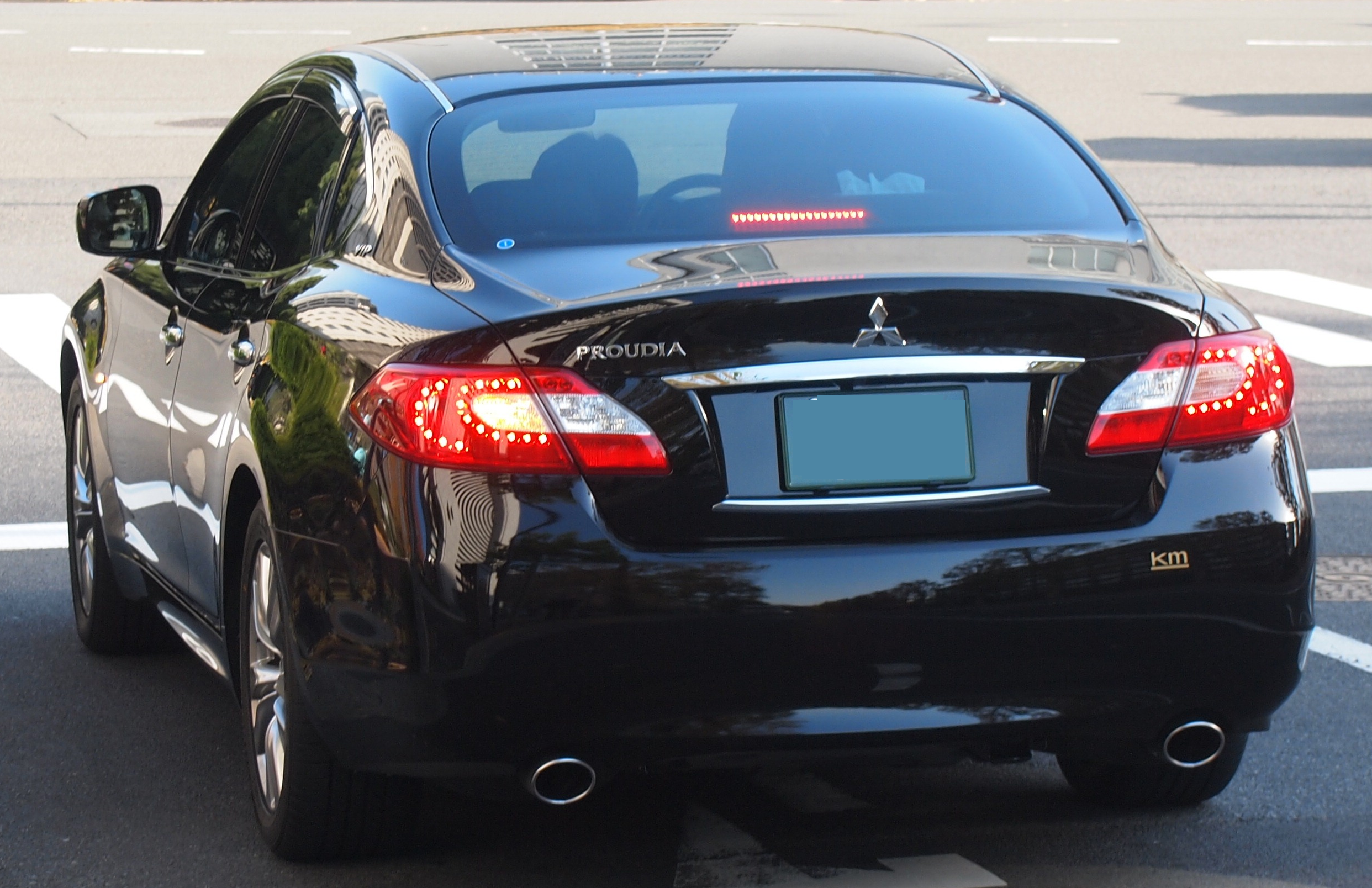
Rear view

In early 2012, Mitsubishi Motors was cooperating with Nissan to sell their own version of the second-generation Nissan Fuga under the Proudia name after an 11-year hiatus, and sales of the Fuga-based Proudia started July 26, 2012. A stretched wheelbase hybrid version was also sold as the Dignity.

Compared to its predecessor, the height is slightly higher; however the length and width have been reduced, resulting in a reduced weight. In addition, all models were in compliance with the 2005 emission standards, resulting in a 75% reduction level over the previous model. The Proudia trim packages were aligned with the Fuga counterparts. The Proudia 250 is equivalent of the Fuga 250GT, along with the 250 VIP to the Fuga 250 VIP, the 370 VIP to the Fuga 370 VIP, and the 370 4WD to the Fuga 370 GT Four. The 4WD model also marked the first time the Proudia had been offered with all-wheel drive. The hybrid engine option offered on the Fuga was not offered on the Proudia, and was only available on the longer Dignity limousine.

The Proudia is cosmetically different from the Fuga, using a Mitsubishi specific grille and appearance items. Many of the items in the Fuga were also available in the Proudia, to include the pollen filter, Nissan's "Safety Shield" packages, such as intelligent cruise control, ECO pedal, intelligent brake assist, with optional items on Nissan-branded products also available on equivalent Proudia trim packages. Nissan's Garnet Black Pearl paint was not offered on the Proudia, with Mitsubishi offered a different color. Some of the optional interior equipment includes heated and ventilated front seats, power reclining rear seats, power ottoman for the rear passenger opposite the driver, and HDD navigation combined with a telematics subscription service called "CarWings" in Japan.

The Proudia/Dignity nameplates were discontinued for the second time in November 2016.

== See also ==
- Mitsubishi Dignity, the longer variation of the Proudia
