= Mitsubishi Dignity =

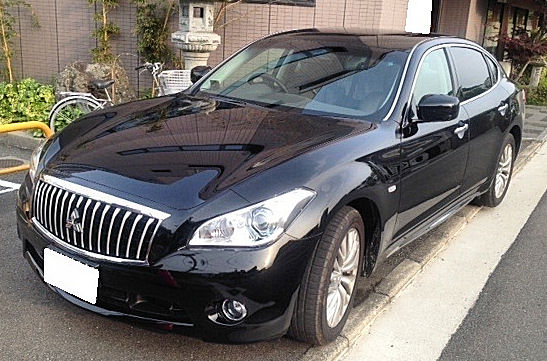
- Second-generation Mitsubishi Dignity (BHGY51)

Overview
- Manufacturer: Mitsubishi Motors (1999–2001); Nissan (2012–2016)
- Production: 1999–2001; 2012–2016

Body and chassis
- Class: Full-size luxury car
- Body style: 4-door limousine (1999–2001); 4-door sedan (2012–2016)
- Layout: Front-engine, front-wheel-drive (1999–2001); Front-engine, rear-wheel-drive (2012–2016)
- Related: Mitsubishi Proudia

Chronology
- Predecessor: Mitsubishi Debonair

The Mitsubishi Dignity (Japanese: 三菱・ディグニティ, Hepburn: Mitsubishi Diguniti) is a full-size luxury car originally manufactured by Mitsubishi Motors from late 1999 to 2001 as the flagship of the company's domestic range, alongside the shorter Proudia, and was reintroduced 2012 to Japanese buyers as a rebadged fifth-generation Nissan Cima. The Dignity was discontinued for the second time in 2016. In Japan, it was sold at a specific retail chain called Galant Shop.

The name "Dignity" was used to describe the "peerless grandeur and majestic stateliness" of the model.

== First generation (S43A; 1999) ==
First generation (S43A)
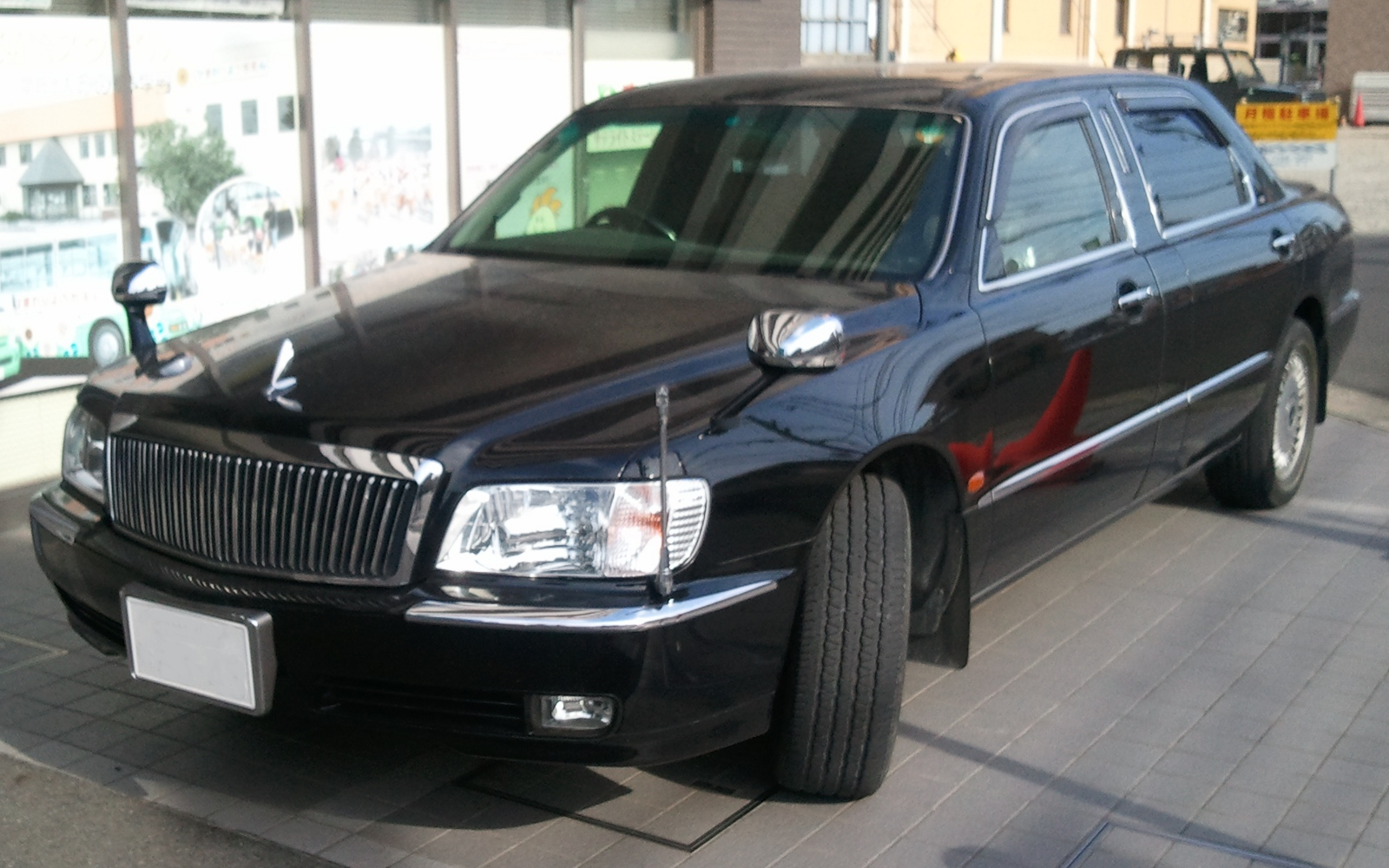

Overview
- Also called: Hyundai Equus
- Production: 1999–2001; 59 produced
- Assembly: Japan: Okazaki, Aichi (Nagoya Plant)

Body and chassis
- Body style: 4-door limousine
- Layout: Transverse Front-engine, front-wheel-drive
- Related: Mitsubishi Proudia (S33A)

Powertrain
- Engine: Gasoline: 4.5 L 8A80 V8
- Power output: 206 kW (280 PS)
- Transmission: 5-speed INVECS-II automatic

Dimensions
- Wheelbase: 3,080 mm (121.3 in)
- Length: 5,335 mm (210.0 in)
- Width: 1,870 mm (73.6 in)
- Height: 1,485 mm (58.5 in)
- Curb weight: 2,370 kg (5,225 lb)

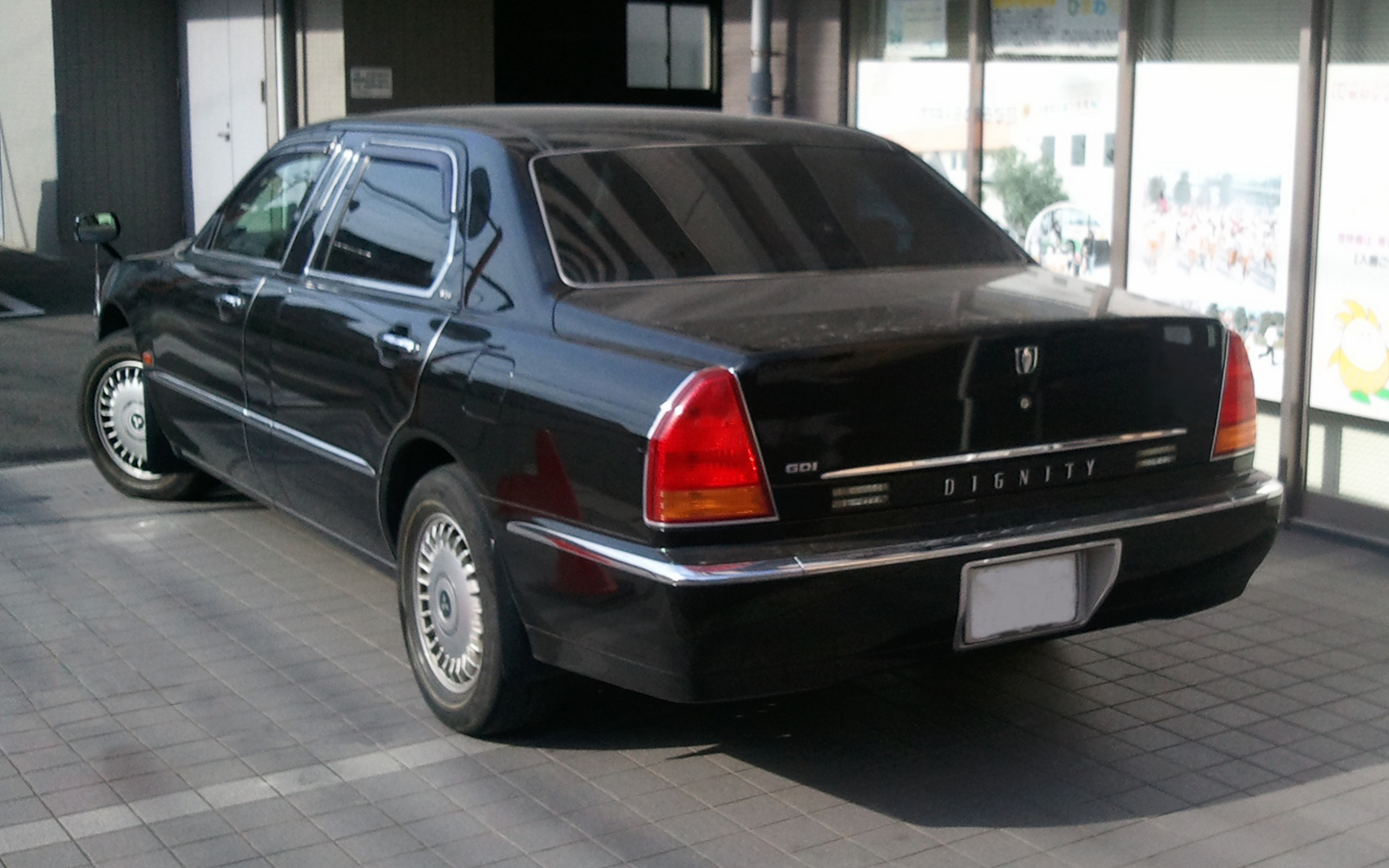
Rear view

The Dignity/Proudia range was designed by Mitsubishi Motors and co-manufactured with Hyundai of South Korea, who marketed their own version as the Hyundai Equus (from 1999 to 2009). The Dignity was introduced as a competitor to the Nissan President, the Toyota Celsior, and the Toyota Century as the company's top level flagship, however Mitsubishi chose to use a transversely installed engine with front-wheel drive. A first-generation Dignity is used by Fumihito, Prince Akishino, the second son of Emperor Emeritus Akihito.

The first-generation Dignity was powered by Mitsubishi's 8A80 4,498 cc, 90-degree, aluminum-block GDi V8 engine producing 206 kW (280 PS) at 5,000 rpm and 412 N⋅m (304 lb⋅ft) of torque at 4,000 rpm, and featured an extension of the Proudia's exterior dimensions in order to liberate more interior space for the rear occupants; the roofline was raised by 10 mm (0.4 in) and the wheelbase was extended by 250 mm (9.8 in). It used MacPherson struts for the front suspension and a multi-link suspension for the rear wheels. The car was equipped with several features like Driver Support System (CCD cameras to monitor adjacent lanes and behind the car for lane departure warning system and blind spot monitor, and a lidar activated adaptive cruise control), self-levelling multi-link air suspension with electronic damping control.

The Dignity and Proudia's combined volumes fell far shy of Mitsubishi's forecasted 300 sales per month, and they were available for only fifteen months from their introduction on February 20, 2000, before Mitsubishi's financial difficulties forced the company to discontinue both models in an effort to streamline its range and reduce costs. However, the Equus proved more commercially successful and would remain in production until replaced in 2008.

=== Production and sales ===
| Year | Production | Sales |
|---|---|---|
| 1999 | 15 | 11 |
| 2000 | 42 | 45 |
| 2001 | 2 | 3 |

== Second generation (BHGY51; 2012) ==
Second generation (BHGY51)
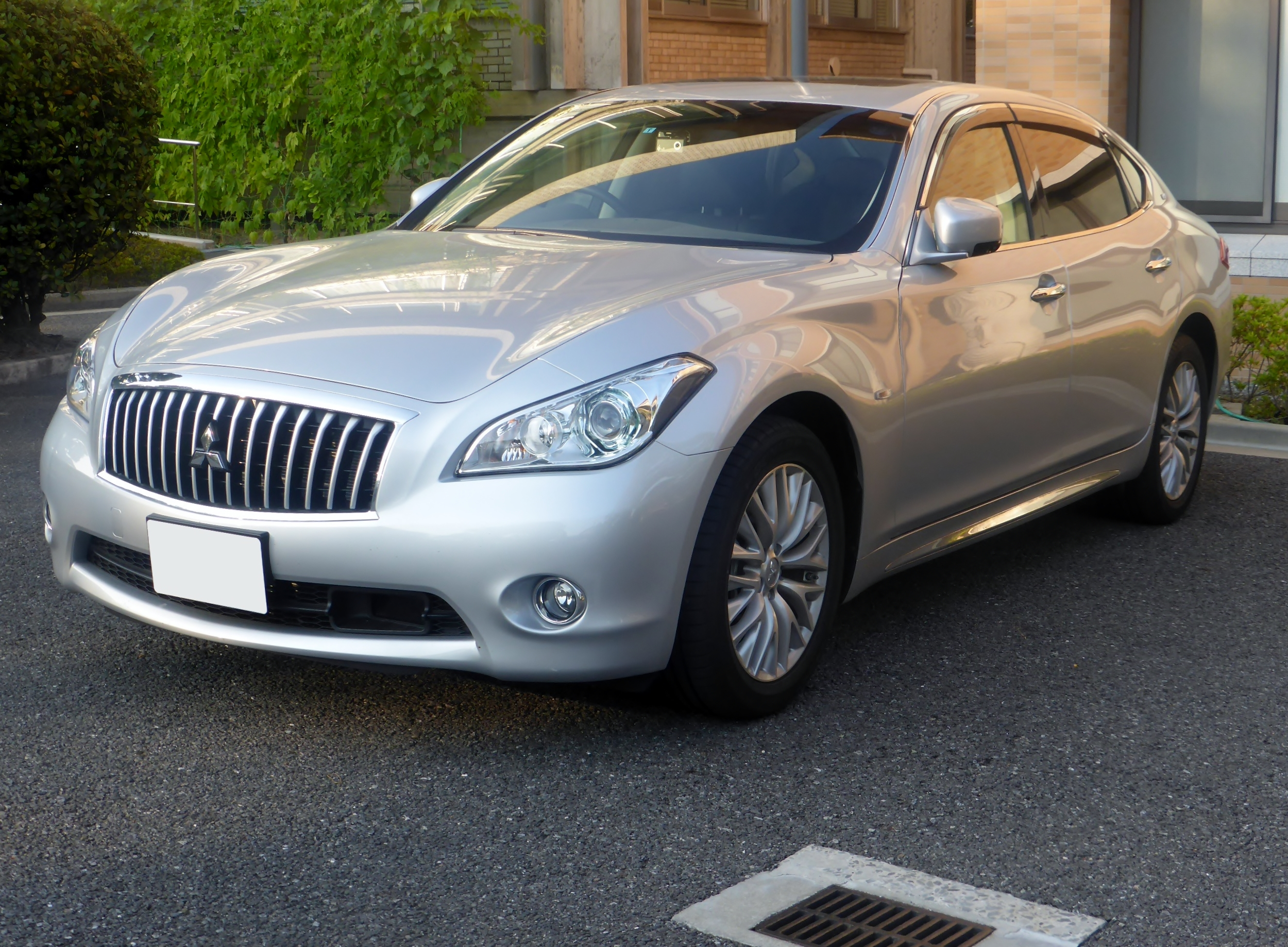

Overview
- Also called: Nissan Cima; Infiniti M/Q70L hybrid
- Production: April 2012 – November 2016
- Assembly: Japan: Kaminokawa, Tochigi

Body and chassis
- Body style: 4-door sedan
- Layout: Front-engine, rear-wheel-drive
- Platform: Nissan FM platform
- Related: Mitsubishi Proudia/Nissan Cima (Y51)

Powertrain
- Engine: Gasoline hybrid: 3.5 L Nissan VQ35HR V6
- Power output: 225 kW (302 hp; 306 PS) (combined system output)
- Transmission: 7-speed automatic

Dimensions
- Wheelbase: 3,050 mm (120.1 in)
- Length: 5,095 mm (200.6 in)
- Width: 1,845 mm (72.6 in)
- Height: 1,510 mm (59.4 in)
- Curb weight: 1,950 kg (4,299 lb)

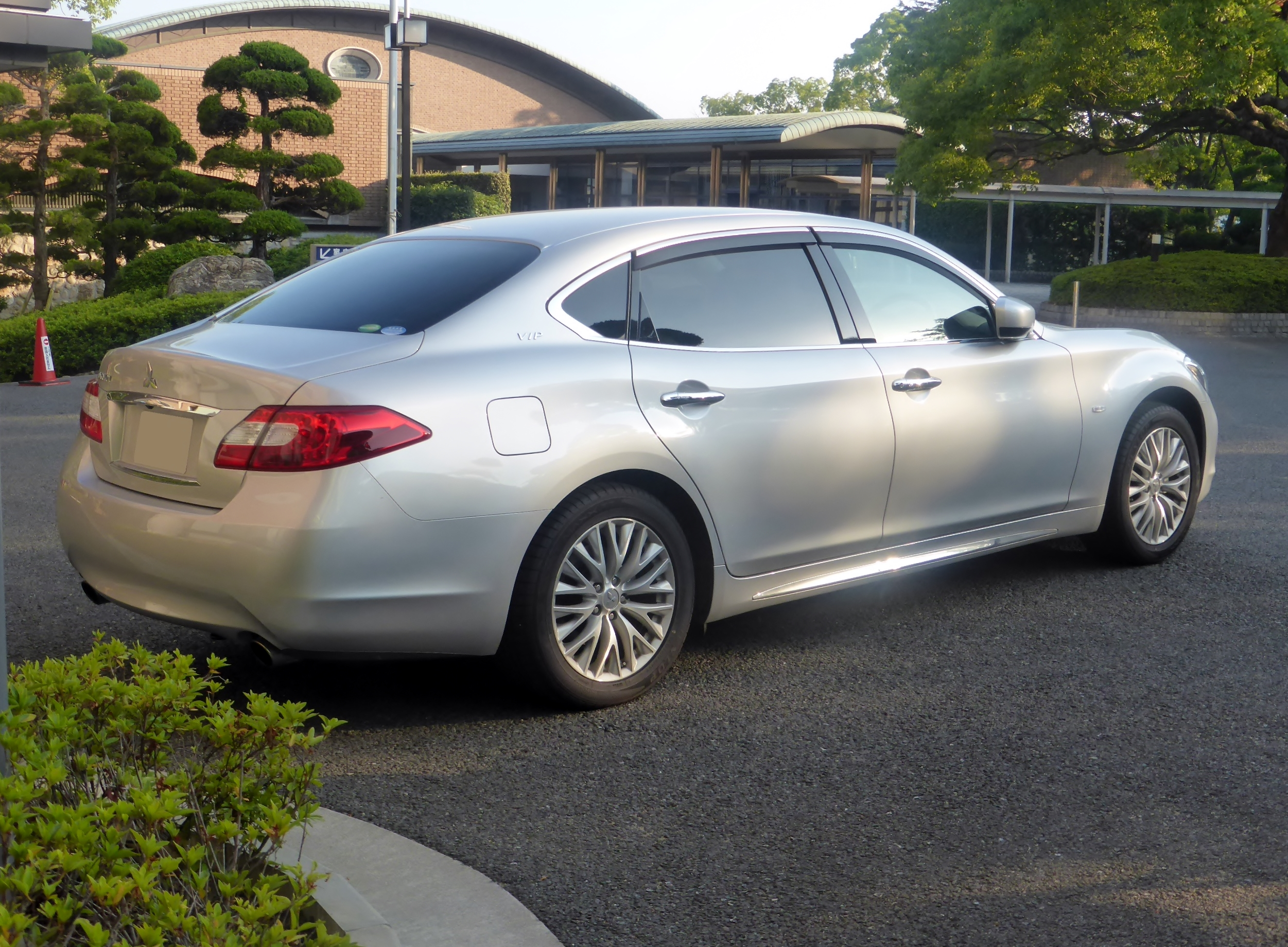
Rear view

The Dignity nameplate was revived as a rebadged rear-wheel drive, fifth-generation Nissan Cima to Japanese customers only starting April 26, 2012. As with the preceding generation, the Dignitys were used as official cars by the Akishino branch of Japan's Imperial family.

The second-generation Dignity is slightly taller, but narrower and shorter, and is lighter by 200 kg (441 lb) over the previous model. It was the first hybrid electric Mitsubishi Motors model to be sold in Japan, and it complied with the 2005 emission standards, achieving a 75% reduction level over the previous model, and achieving the 2003 Japanese government fuel economy standards. While the Dignity was only offered with one engine option, which is the Nissan's 3,498 cc VQ35HR V6 engine, the "Pure Drive/Hybrid" badge is not installed, and it was differed cosmetically from the Cima on which it is based. Many items offered on the Dignity were carried over from the Cima, including the lattice rear retractable window screen. The Dignity was offered in only one trim package, called the "VIP", which is equivalent to the Cima's VIP G trim. However, the Dignity was not available with all-wheel drive system, unlike the Cima. Nissan's GPS navigation system called CarWings was also included.

The Dignity/Proudia nameplates were discontinued for the second time in November 2016. Sales were extremely low - between July 2012 and February 2015, 98 examples were sold in Japan, the car's only market.

== See also ==
- Mitsubishi Proudia, the shorter variation of the Dignity
