= Mitsubishi 8A8 engine =

Overview
- Manufacturer: Mitsubishi Motors
- Production: 1999–2008

Layout
- Configuration: Naturally aspirated 90° V8
- Displacement: 4.5 L (4,498 cc)
- Cylinder bore: 86 mm (3.39 in)
- Piston stroke: 96.8 mm (3.81 in)
- Cylinder block material: Aluminium
- Cylinder head material: Aluminium alloy
- Valvetrain: DOHC
- Compression ratio: 10.7:1

Combustion
- Fuel system: Direct injection
- Fuel type: Gasoline
- Cooling system: Water-cooled

Output
- Power output: 280 PS (206 kW; 276 hp)
- Specific power: 62.2 PS (45.7 kW; 61.3 hp) per litre
- Torque output: 412 N⋅m (304 lb⋅ft)

The Mitsubishi 8A8 engine is a range of V8 powerplants produced by Mitsubishi Motors since 1999. The only variant to date is the 8A80, a 4.5 L (4,498 cc) with double overhead camshafts and gasoline direct injection (GDI) technology. Financial pressures forced the company to discontinue sales of the Proudia and Dignity, the only vehicles in its range to which it was fitted, after only fifteen months.

However, the two vehicles were developed in partnership with the Hyundai Motor Company of South Korea, with whom Mitsubishi has had a longstanding relationship. While Mitsubishi makes the cylinder heads and other GDI-related equipment, Hyundai casts the aluminium block, and other major internal components. Hyundai's version of the Proudia/Dignity, the Equus, proved more successful, and this has been the sole application of the powerplant since 2001. Hyundai replaced the engine with its newly developed Tau V8 in 2008 when the second generation rear wheel drive Equus replaced the first model.

== 8A80 (1999–2008) ==
- Bore pitch — 95 mm (3.74 in)
- Stroke -- 96.8 mm (3.81 in)
- Power — 280 PS (206 kW; 276 hp) at 5000 rpm
- Torque — 412 N⋅m (304 lb⋅ft) at 4000 rpm

== Application ==
- Mitsubishi Proudia
- Mitsubishi Dignity
- Hyundai Equus First generation (LZ/YJ; 1999–2009)

== See also ==
- List of Mitsubishi engines
