= Hyundai Equus =

Luxury sedan manufactured by Hyundai

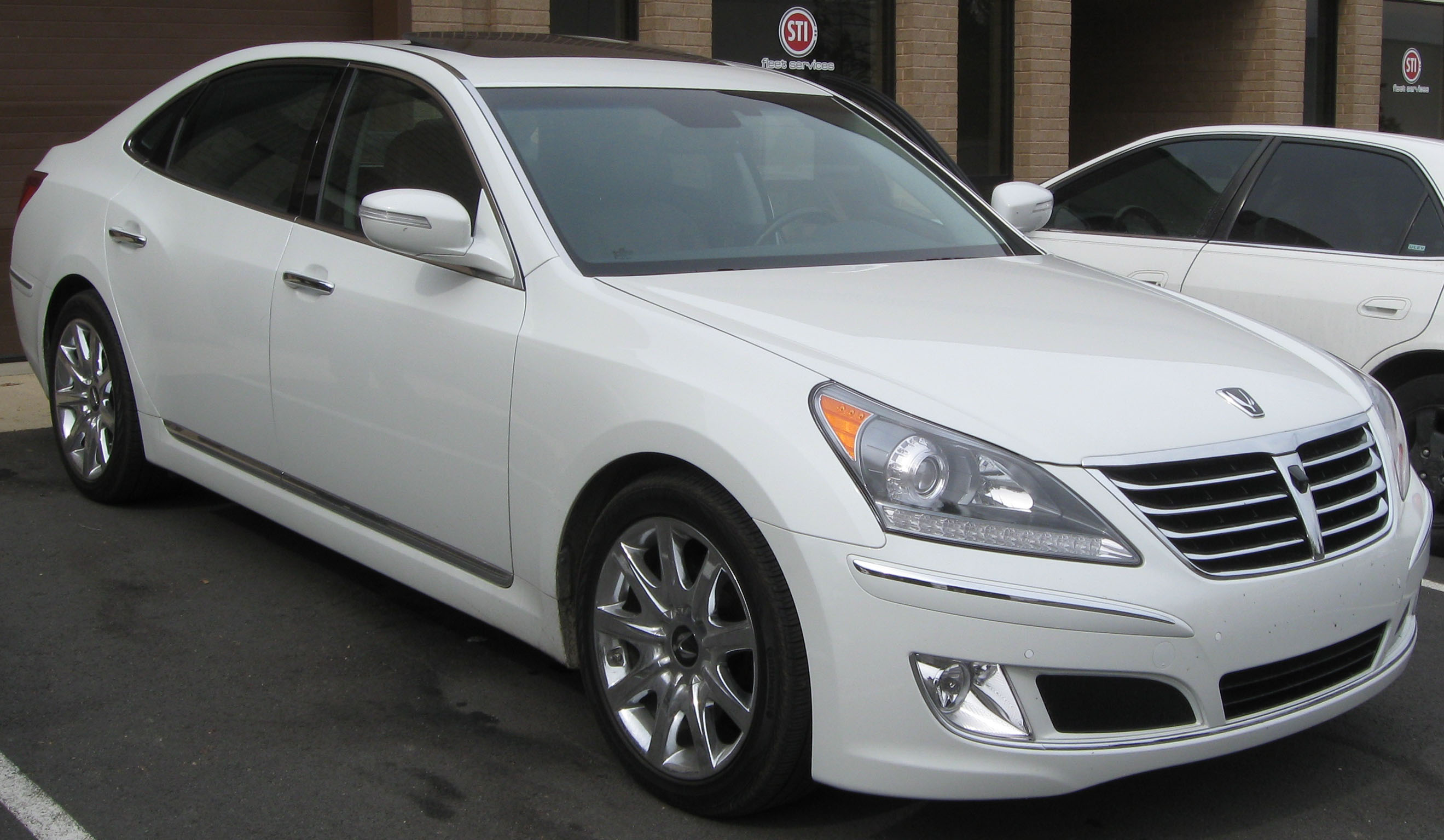

Overview
- Manufacturer: Hyundai
- Production: 1999–2016
- Assembly: South Korea: Ulsan (Hyundai Motor Company Ulsan Plant); Russia: Kaliningrad (Avtotor: 2013–2016)

Body and chassis
- Class: Full-size luxury car (F)
- Body style: 4-door sedan
- Layout: Front-engine, front-wheel-drive (1999–2009); Front-engine, rear-wheel-drive (2009–2016)

Chronology
- Successor: Genesis G90

The Hyundai Equus (Korean: 현대 에쿠스; RR: Hyundai Equus) is a full-sized, front-engine, rear-wheel-drive luxury sedan manufactured and marketed by Hyundai Motor Company from 1999 to 2016. It was produced over two generations in a four-door, five passenger configuration. The nameplate derives from the Latin equus, meaning "horse."

A second generation was released in 2009. As of August 2014, it was sold in South Korea, Russia, China, United States, Canada, Central America, and South America — as well as in the Middle East under the Hyundai Centennial (현대 센테니얼) nameplate.

On November 4, 2015, Hyundai officially announced it would move the Genesis model to Hyundai's new luxury vehicle division, Genesis Motor. The 2016 successor to the Hyundai Equus was rebranded as Genesis G90 (EQ900 in Korea until 2018).

== First generation (LZ/YJ; 1999) ==
First generation
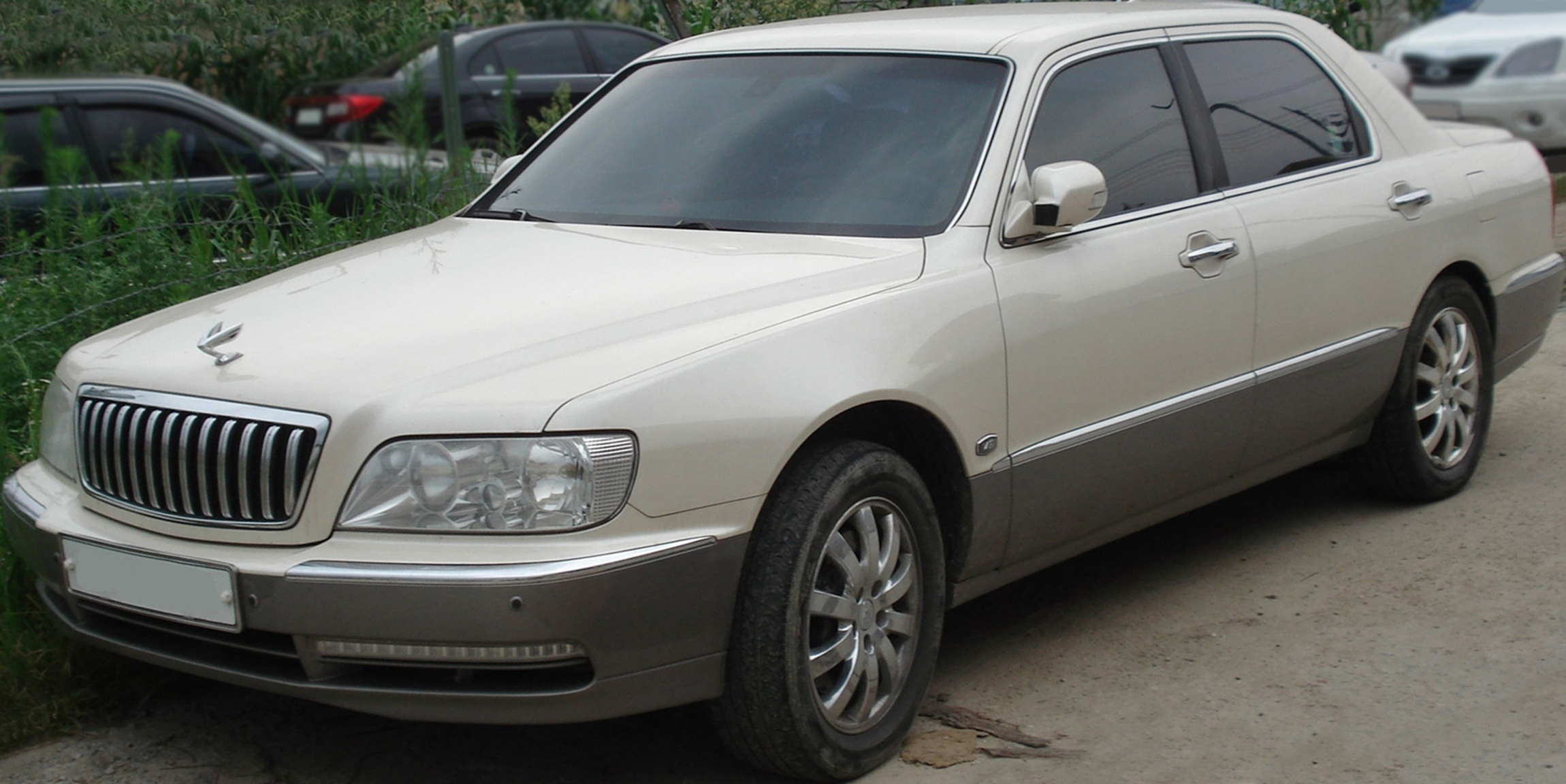

Overview
- Manufacturer: Mitsubishi Motors Corporation; Hyundai Motor Company
- Model code: LZ/YJ
- Also called: Hyundai Centennial; Mitsubishi Proudia; Mitsubishi Dignity
- Production: 1999–2009
- Assembly: South Korea: Ulsan

Body and chassis
- Layout: Transverse Front-engine, front-wheel-drive
- Related: Mitsubishi Proudia; Mitsubishi Dignity

Powertrain
- Engine: Petrol: 3.0 L Sigma V6; 3.3 L Lambda MPi V6; 3.5 L Sigma V6; 3.8 L Lambda MPi V6; 4.5 L Omega GDi V8; 4.5 L Omega MPi V8
- Transmission: 5-speed automatic

Dimensions
- Wheelbase: 2,840–2,850 mm (111.8–112.2 in) (Sedan); 3,080–3,090 mm (121.3–121.7 in) (Limousine)
- Length: 5,065 mm (199.4 in) (1999–2003 Sedan); 5,335 mm (210.0 in) (1999–2003 Limousine); 5,120 mm (201.6 in) (2003–2008 Sedan); 5,390 mm (212.2 in) (2003–2008 Limousine)
- Width: 1,870 mm (73.6 in)
- Height: 1,465 mm (57.7 in) (1999–2003 Sedan); 1,475 mm (58.1 in) (1999–2003 Limousine); 1,480 mm (58.3 in) (2003–2008 Sedan); 1,485 mm (58.5 in) (2003–2008 Limousine)
- Curb weight: 1,865–2,055 kg (4,112–4,530 lb) (Sedan); 2,035–2,185 kg (4,486–4,817 lb) (Limousine)

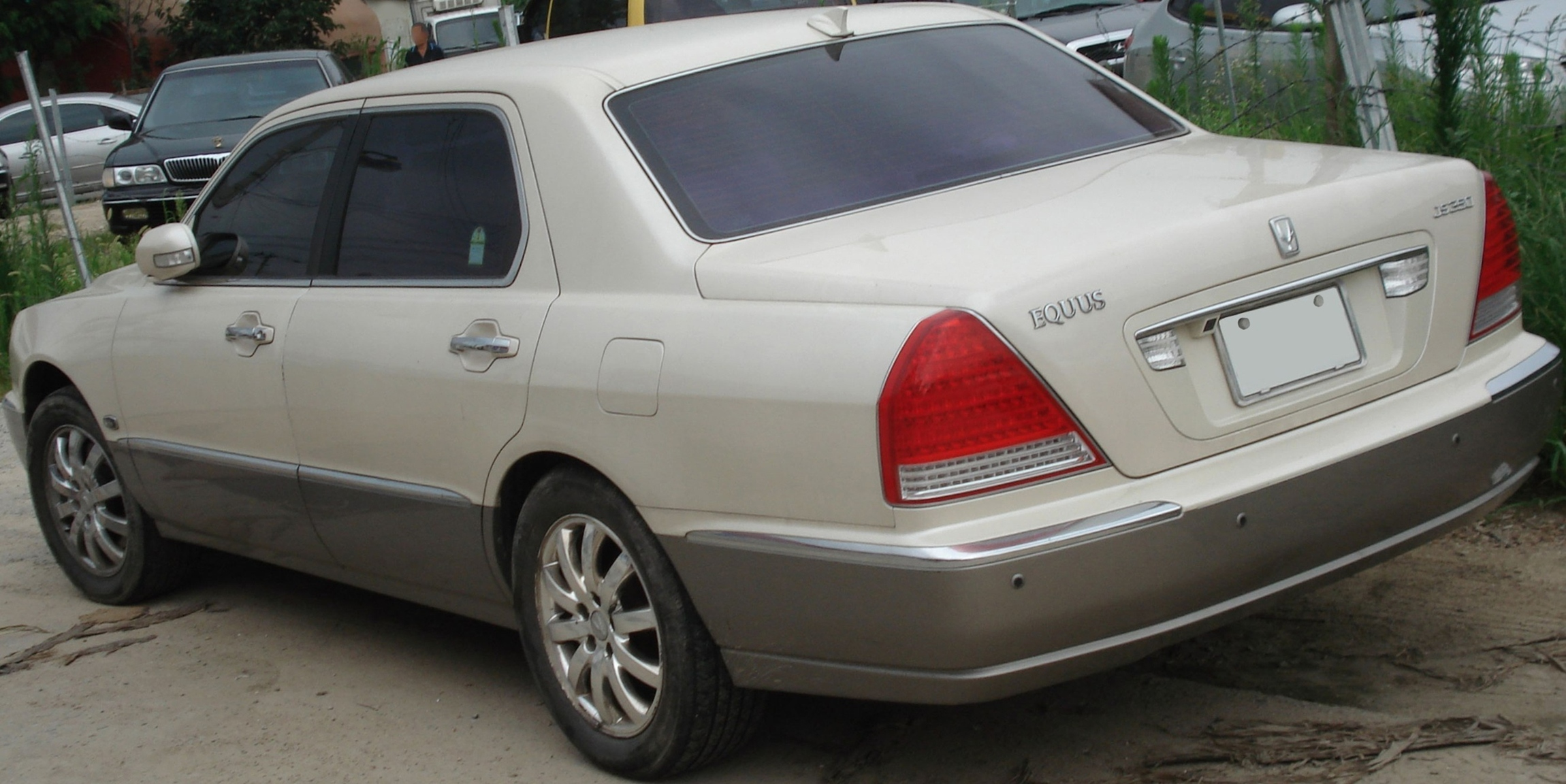
Hyundai Equus

In 1999, Hyundai Motors and Mitsubishi Motors presented their full-size sedan. Hyundai said that it was making a full-size sedan to compete with Mercedes-Benz S-Class and BMW 7 Series in the Korean market. In reality, it was competing against its domestic rival, the SsangYong Chairman. Hyundai had great success with the Equus in South Korea, but very few were exported to other countries. One was exported for the 2001 New York International Auto Show to gauge the reaction of U.S. consumers. Hyundai identified the car to the U.S. consumers as the Hyundai LZ450 luxury sedan but it was not sold in the United States.

The first generation was designed by Mitsubishi Motors, who had their own version called the Proudia. It was jointly manufactured by both companies. The first-generation model was introduced in 1999 as a front-wheel-drive car measuring 5.1 m (200.8 in) long and 1.9 m (74.8 in) wide. A long-wheelbase limousine model was available exclusively for the Korean domestic market, and at ₩92,510,000 South Korean won for the 2008 model with a V8 and no options, was the most expensive model in the company's lineup. The first-generation Equus extended-length limousine was also mechanically related to the Mitsubishi Dignity limousine for the Japanese market. The first-generation Equus were sold in South Korea, China, and the Middle East. A very limited number, badged as the Centennial, were made available for some western European markets in the early and mid-2000s. At first, there were two engine types: a 3.5 Sigma V6 and 4.5 8A80 (Omega) V8 engine. After a few months, the 3.0 Sigma V6 engine type was added. Two versions were available: a sedan (3.0, 3.5 and 4.5) and a limousine (3.5 and 4.5). In Japan, under the name of Mitsubishi Dignity (limousine version) and Mitsubishi Proudia (sedan version), about 2,000 units were sold.

The 4.5-litre 8A80 (Omega) V8 engine was a GDI (Gasoline Direct Injection) type engine, which was designed and developed by Mitsubishi Motors. This engine was optimized for premium unleaded gasoline fuel, but there was little opportunity to get this type of fuel in Korea at that time. So, most of these engines used normal unleaded gasoline fuel, which caused significant performance issues, resulting in complaints from drivers. Finally, Hyundai Motors modified this engine from a GDI Type to a MPI (Multi Point Injection) type to solve the issue. Hyundai also added curtain airbags in 2001 and active head restraints in 2002.

=== New Equus ===
In 2003, Hyundai presented their 'New Equus', changing the hood design and some of interior. A 7-inch screen for the rear seat, Xenon headlamps, front parking sensors, etc. were newly offered. It introduced seat ventilation cooling and heating, climate control with air purifier (2003), Alcantara leather seats (2007). From 2005, 3.0 and 3.5 Sigma V6 engine types were changed to 3.3 and 3.8 Lambda V6 engine types which were designed and developed by Hyundai Motors. But the automatic transmission was not changed. Hyundai officially ceased the production of 1st generation Equus in November 2009. A new bigger, rear-wheel drive Equus was launched in March 2009. Instead of continuing production like Hyundai, Mitsubishi Motors ended the production of the Proudia and the Dignity around the time of the introduction of this model.

=== Limousine model ===
A limousine model was made for the Korean market. Equus Limousines have been used by famous company owners in Korea as well as foreign VIPs.

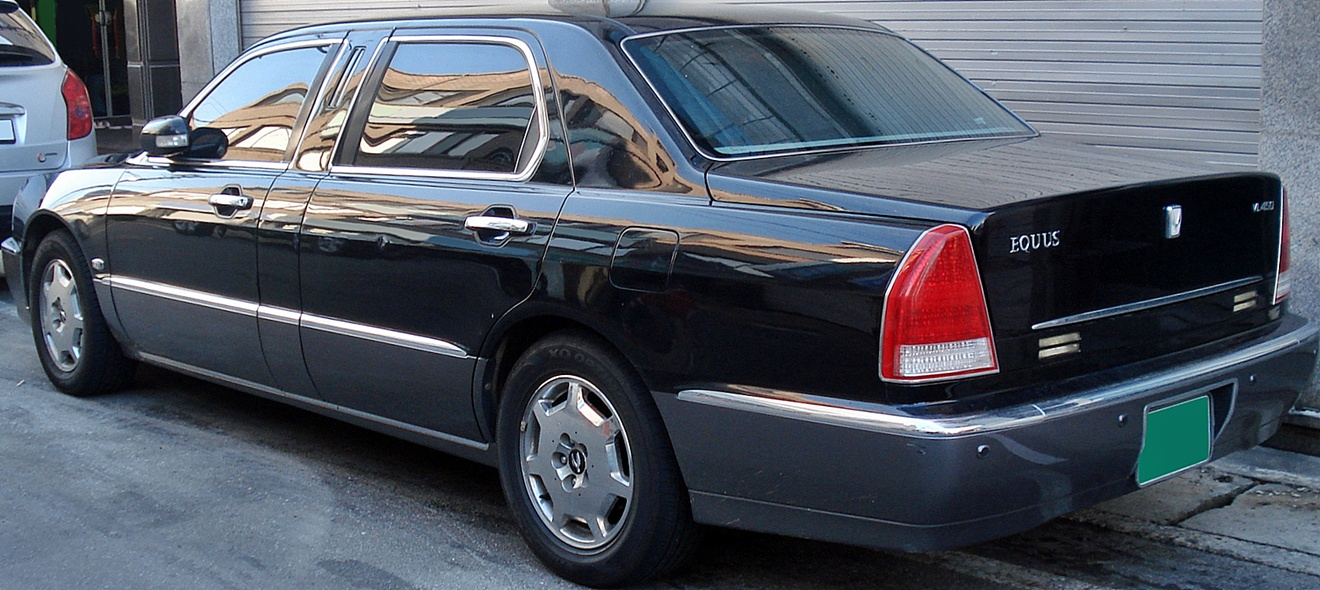
Equus Limousine, first generation

Back seat of Equus Limousine - designed to maximize the comfort of the occupant of the right rear seat

== Second generation (VI; 2009) ==
Second generation
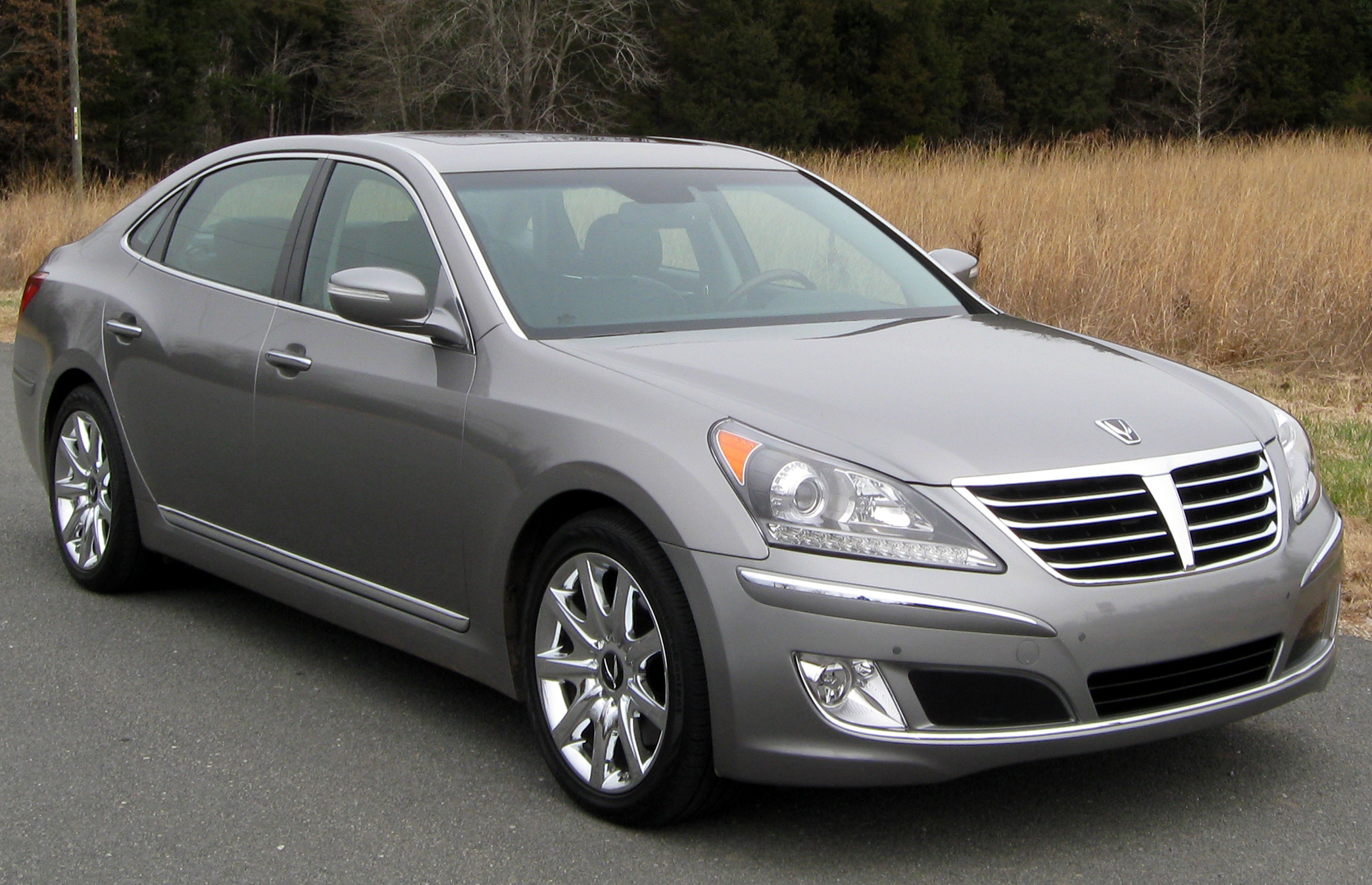

Overview
- Model code: VI
- Also called: Hyundai Centennial
- Production: 2009–2015
- Model years: 2010–2016
- Assembly: South Korea: Ulsan; Russia: Kaliningrad (Avtotor)

Body and chassis
- Layout: Front-engine, rear-wheel-drive
- Platform: Hyundai BH
- Related: Hyundai Genesis; Kia Quoris/K900/K9

Powertrain
- Engine: Petrol: 3.8 L Lambda II MPi V6; 3.8 L Lambda II GDi V6; 4.6 L Tau MPi V8; 5.0 L Tau MPi V8; 5.0 L Tau GDi V8
- Transmission: 6-speed automatic; 8-speed automatic

Dimensions
- Wheelbase: 3,045 mm (119.9 in) (Sedan); 3,345 mm (131.7 in) (Limousine)
- Length: 5,160 mm (203.1 in) (Sedan); 5,460 mm (215.0 in) (Limousine)
- Width: 1,900 mm (74.8 in)
- Height: 1,490–1,495 mm (58.7–58.9 in)
- Curb weight: 1,875–2,040 kg (4,134–4,497 lb) (Sedan); 2,040–2,150 kg (4,497–4,740 lb) (Limousine)

=== Initial version ===
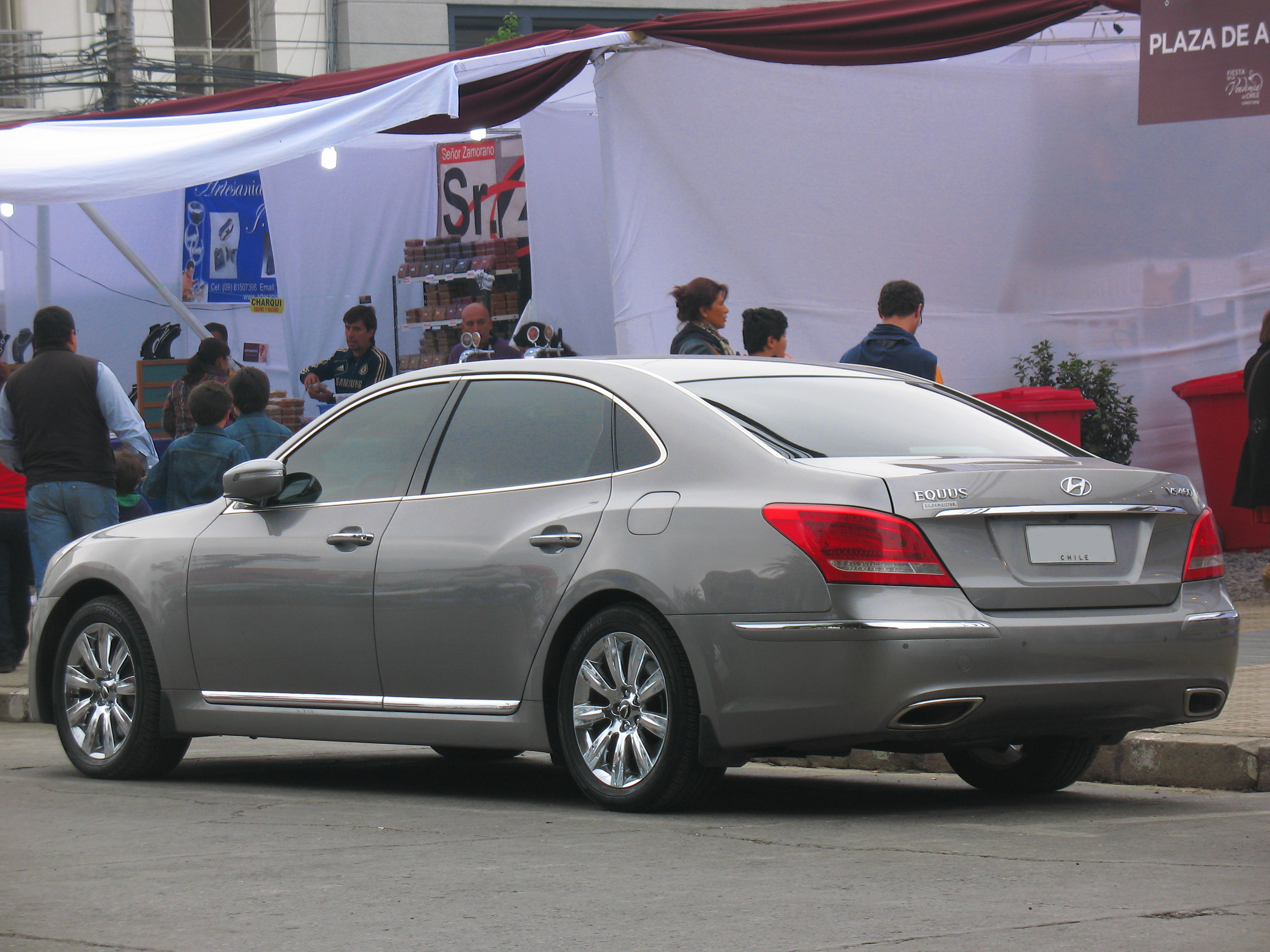
Hyundai Equus VS460 GLS (Chile)

The second generation Equus, codename "VI", was unveiled at the Grand Hyatt Seoul. Unlike the old Equus, the VI has a rear-wheel drive architecture, a longer wheelbase, and a different engine. The VI is based on an all-new platform, developed in-house by the Hyundai Motor Corporation.

The South Korean domestic market Equus was available as a 3.8L "Prime" and a 4.6L "Prestige." It is the most expensive model in the company's lineup. It launched in the People's Republic of China in August 2009. The Hyundai Equus was listed in the '10 exciting cars for 2010' from Forbes.

The US model was announced in 2009 Pebble Beach Concours d'Elegance, and was unveiled in 2010 New York Auto Show. Early US model includes the same 4.6L V8 engine as the Genesis except with 10 hp (7 kW) more than the current version. This puts the total engine output at 385 hp (287 kW) with 333 lb⋅ft (451 N⋅m). The North American Equus features a badge attached on the hood as opposed to the hood ornament, the grille features a horizontal grid pattern like its Genesis sibling as opposed to the vertical one on international models, and an included iPad device with an Equus user's guide application pre-installed as opposed to a traditional owner's manual.

It was the first Hyundai with an Electronically controlled air suspension (EAS) and Continuous Damping Control (CDC). It was also the first Hyundai with Vehicle Stability Management (VSM) collision avoidance system that manages electronic stability control, the electronic parking brake, radar smart cruise control and the seatbelt tensioning system for optimal safety.

=== Equus Limousine ===
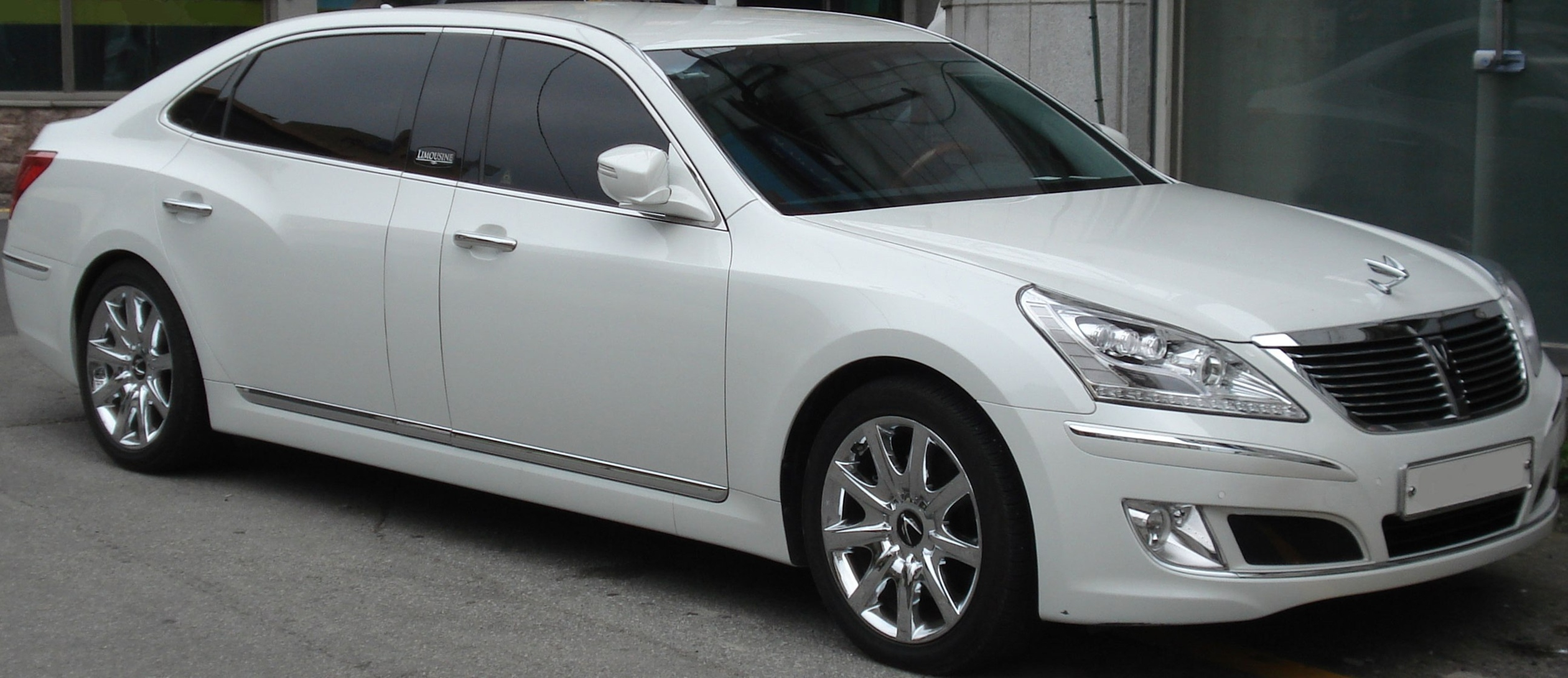

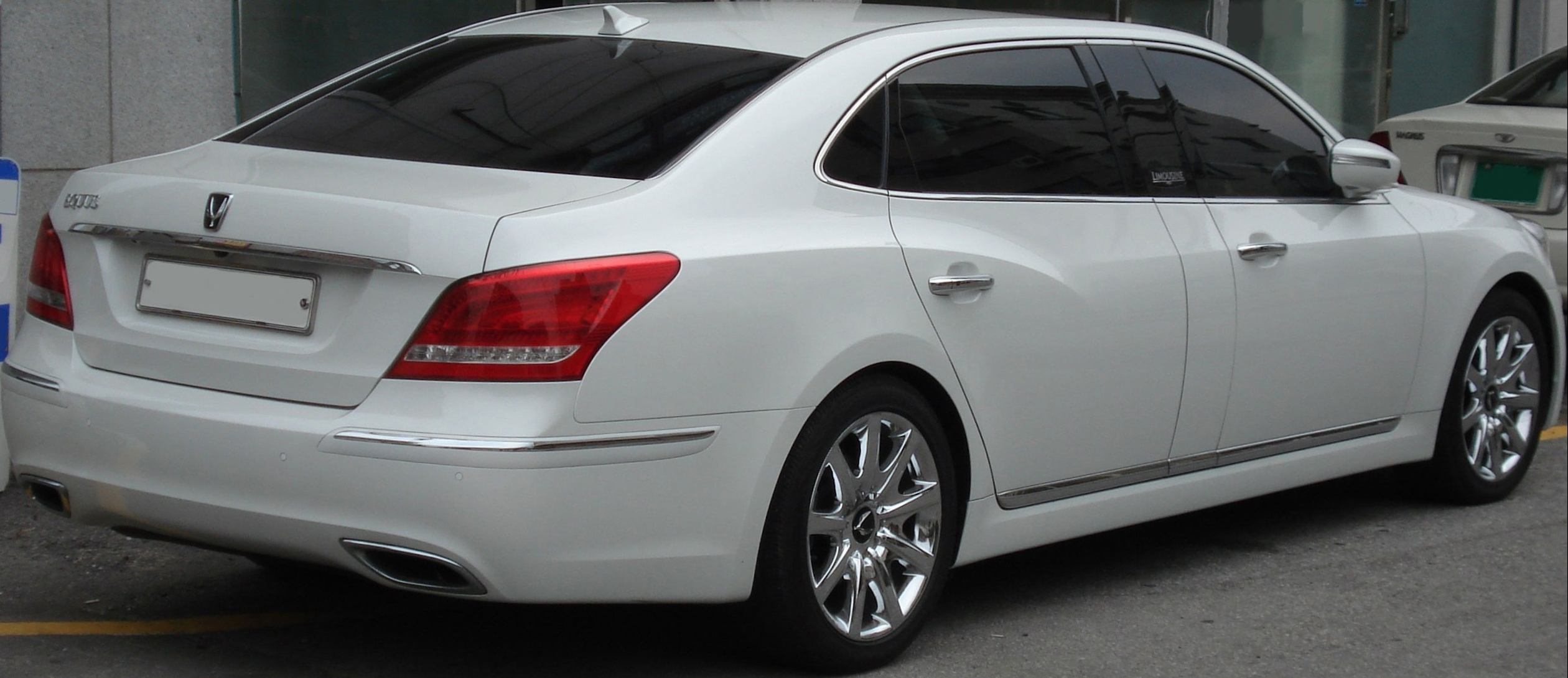
2010 Hyundai Equus Limousine

The long-wheelbase version Equus was unveiled in September 2009. It is 300 mm (11.8 in) longer than the sedan version. Engine choices include Lambda 3.8L and Tau 5.0L engines. The limousine model has an exclusive horizontal cross-bar radiator grille, as well as features such as a power-driven footrest, rear-seat leg support and a massage system.

Hyundai also developed an armoured vehicle based on the limousine, with an enlarged 5.5L version of the V8 engine. In September 2009, Hyundai delivered three bulletproof limousine versions of the luxury sedan Equus to the South Korea Presidential Security Service to be used as the official state car. Hyundai designed this vehicle with a special alloy, with an automatic cooling system in case of fire as well as bulletproof windows.

The first-built armoured limousine was donated to Blue House. A modified Hyundai Equus was donated to Costa Rica and is currently used as the presidential car.

The limousine was available only in South Korea and Russia. The Russian version had the same price tag as the South Korean version.

=== Powertrain update (2011) ===
Hyundai introduced 3.8 L and 5.0 L GDi engines to replace the existing 3.8 L, 4.6 L and 5.0L MPi engines with a new 8-speed automatic transmission replacing the older 6-speed transmission on all applications. For North America, the updated Equus debuted as a 2012 model year with the 5.0L V8 engine rated 429 hp (320 kW) and 376 lb⋅ft (510 N⋅m). The engine updates carried over to the facelifted Hyundai Genesis as well.

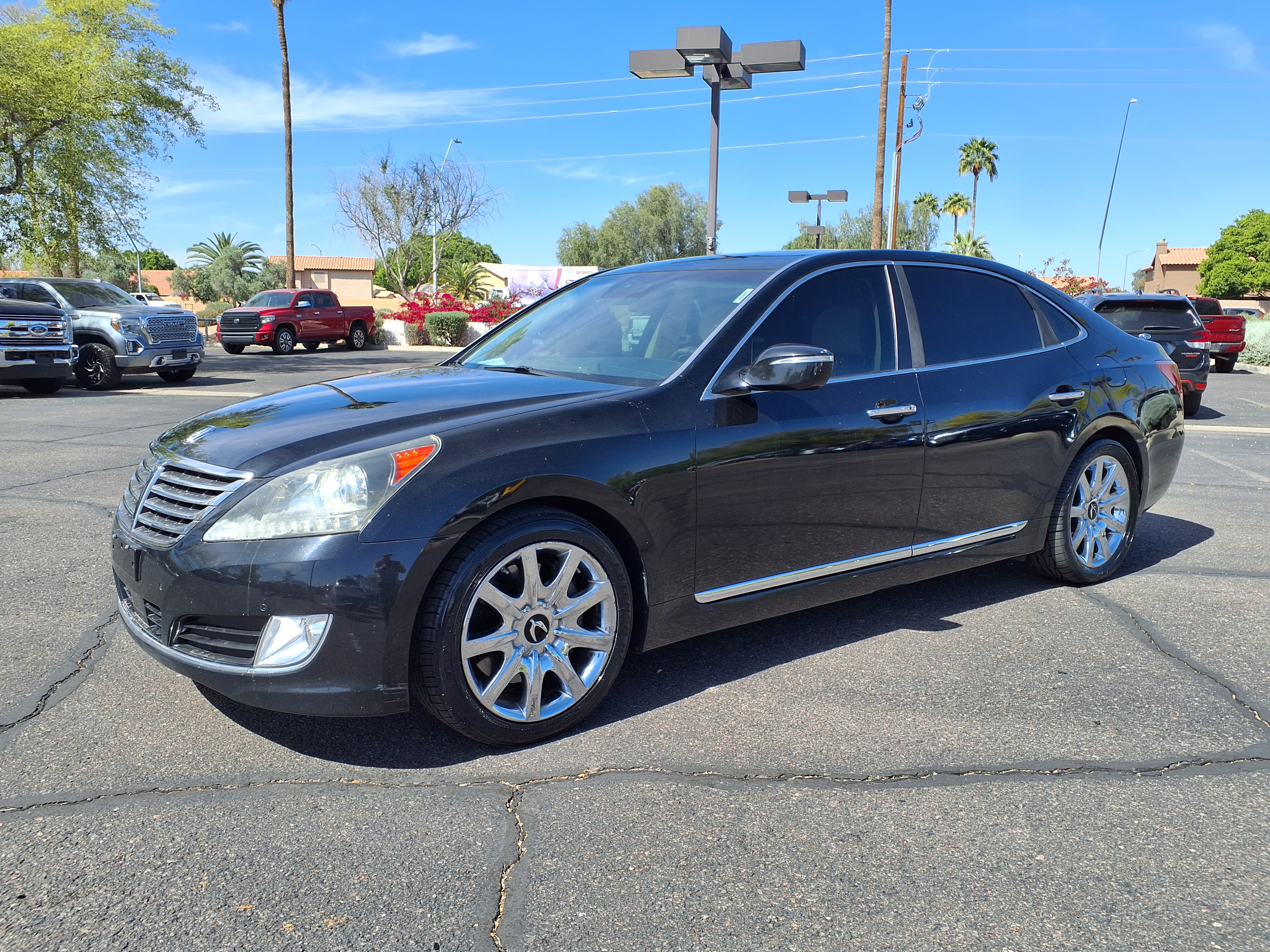
facelift (2013-2016)

=== Facelift (2013) ===
Updates included new 19-inch alloy wheels, front fascia and grille design, side mirrors, tail lamp graphics, standard LED fog lamps, instrumental panel and center stack, center console and shift lever design, steering wheel control layout with vehicle settings, genuine wood trim selections, rear seat center console controls, ride tuning, sport mode, front suspension bushings, standard Assurance Connected Care & Blue Link, 7-inch TFT LCD cluster display (Signature), 12.3-inch fully digital TFT LCD cluster display (Ultimate), larger 9.2-inch upper center stack LCD, climate control system offers three distinct cabin temperature zones, standard smart cruise control with stop/start (from 0 mph), proximity smart key with both key fob and card-key types, dual 9.2-inch rear seat entertainment monitors, power door closure, power lumbar for rear outboard seats, standard Assurance Connected Care (3-year complimentary services), standard Rear Cross-traffic Alert, standard Blind Spot Detection (BSD), heads-up display, vehicle multi-view camera system.

This Equus was unveiled at the 2013 New York Auto Show. US models went on sale in 2013 as 2014 model year vehicles. The Tau 5.0 GDi engine is the only engine offered in the US.

In 2013, a shipment of 61 2014 Hyundai Equus sedans carried by South Korean freighter Morning Spruce destined for the United States was adrift for days after the ship had lost engine power in Pacific Ocean.

On 11 March 2014, an Equus sedan was used in the Chilean inauguration ceremony.

=== Body style ===
| Model | Sedan (VSxx0) | Limousine (VLxx0) |
|---|---|---|
| Lambda II 3.8 MPi | 2009–2011 | 2009–2011 |
| Lambda II 3.8 GDi | 2011–2015 | 2011–2015 |
| Tau 4.6 MPi | 2009–2011 | N/A |
| Tau 5.0 MPi | N/A | 2009–2011 |
| Tau 5.0 GDi | 2011–2015 | 2011–2015 |

US, Canadian models include only sedan (VS500).

South Korean models include sedan (VS380, VS460, VS500) and limousine (VL380, VL500).

=== Powertrain ===
Petrol engines
| Model | Years | Type/code | Transmission | Power | Torque |
|---|---|---|---|---|---|
| Lambda II 3.8 MPi | 2009–2011 | 3,778 cc (230.5 cu in) V6 | 6-speed automatic | 290 PS (213 kW; 286 hp) at 6,200 rpm | 36.5 kg⋅m (358 N⋅m; 264 lbf⋅ft) at 4,500 rpm |
| Lambda II 3.8 GDi | 2011–2015 | 3,778 cc (230.5 cu in) V6 | 8-speed automatic | 334 PS (246 kW; 329 hp) at 6,400 rpm | 40.3 kg⋅m (395 N⋅m; 291 lbf⋅ft) at 5,100 rpm |
| Tau 4.6 MPi | 2009–2011 | 4,627 cc (282.4 cu in) V8 | 6-speed automatic | 366 PS (269 kW; 361 hp) at 6,500 rpm | 44.8 kg⋅m (439 N⋅m; 324 lbf⋅ft) at 3,500 rpm |
| Tau 4.6 MPi | 2010–2011 | 4,627 cc (282.4 cu in) V8 | 6-speed automatic | 383 PS (282 kW; 378 hp) at 6,500 rpm 390 PS (287 kW; 385 hp) at 6,500 rpm (Premium fuel) | 44.8 kg⋅m (439 N⋅m; 324 lbf⋅ft) at 3,500 rpm 46.0 kg⋅m (451 N⋅m; 333 lbf⋅ft) at 3,500 rpm (Premium fuel) |
| Tau 5.0 MPi | 2009–2011 | 5,038 cc (307.4 cu in) V8 | 6-speed automatic | 400 PS (294 kW; 395 hp) at 6,400 rpm (Premium fuel) | 51.0 kg⋅m (500 N⋅m; 369 lbf⋅ft) at 3,500 rpm (Premium fuel) |
| Tau 5.0 GDi | 2013–2015 | 5,038 cc (307.4 cu in) V8 | 8-speed automatic | 416 PS (306 kW; 410 hp) at 6,400 rpm | 52.0 kg⋅m (510 N⋅m; 376 lbf⋅ft) at 5,000 rpm |
| Tau 5.0 GDi | 2011–2015 | 5,038 cc (307.4 cu in) V8 | 8-speed automatic | 423 PS (311 kW; 417 hp) at 6,400 rpm | 50.5 kg⋅m (495 N⋅m; 365 lbf⋅ft) at 5,000 rpm |
| Tau 5.0 GDi | 2011–2013 | 5,038 cc (307.4 cu in) V8 | 8-speed automatic | 430 PS (316 kW; 424 hp) at 6,400 rpm | 52.0 kg⋅m (510 N⋅m; 376 lbf⋅ft) at 5,000 rpm |
| Tau 5.0 GDi | 2011–2015 | 5,038 cc (307.4 cu in) V8 | 8-speed automatic | 430 PS (316 kW; 424 hp) at 6,400 rpm (Regular); 435 PS (320 kW; 429 hp) at 6,400 rpm (Premium) | 52.0 kg⋅m (510 N⋅m; 376 lbf⋅ft) at 5,000 rpm |

South Korean models include Lambda 3.8 MPi, Lambda II 3.8 GDi, Tau 4.6 MPi (366PS), Tau 5.0 MPi engines and the Tau 5.0 GDi (416PS) and (430PS) engines.

US models include only the Tau 4.6 MPi (390PS) for the 2011 mode year with the Tau 5.0 GDi (435PS) installed from 2012 model year forward.

=== Customized versions ===
==== RMR Signature Edition Equus (2010) ====
The RMR Signature Edition Equus is a concept vehicle customized by Rhys Millen Racing, based on an Equus with the 4.6 Tau engine. It included a bolt-on RMR Signature Edition air intake and stainless exhaust, increased engine power by 30 hp, RMR Signature Edition embroidered headrests and floor mats, and ostrich hide leather seats with suede accents.

The vehicle was unveiled in the 2010 SEMA Show.

==== DUB Edition Hyundai Equus (2010) ====
The DUB Edition Equus is based on the 2011 Equus sedan and built by Mummbles Marketing and DUB Magazine. It included Trex DUB Design mesh grille, DUB Design custom body kit, tinted windows and tail lights, a custom two-tone gloss black-and-matte charcoal body colour, DUB Edition custom suspension, 24-inch TIS modular style 10 wheels with Pirelli Pzero Nero Tires, custom trunk enclosure with Infinity Kappa audio (9 Infinity Kappa Series speakers, KAPPA ONE mono and KAPPA FOUR four-channel amplifiers), DUB Design custom leather and suede upholstery, DUB Design illuminated headliner and custom rear bucket seats.

The vehicle was unveiled in the 2010 SEMA Show.

==== Armoured Limousine (2012) ====
On 17 December 2012, an armoured Equus Limousine was delivered to Secretary-General of the United Nations (UN) Ban Ki-moon at the UN Headquarters in New York, U.S.

==== Equus by Hermès (2013) ====
A limited (3 units) version of 2013 Hyundai Equus limousine was built in collaboration with French fashion label Hermès.

The vehicle was unveiled in the 2013 Seoul Motor Show.
