= INVECS =

Automatic transmission by Mitsubishi

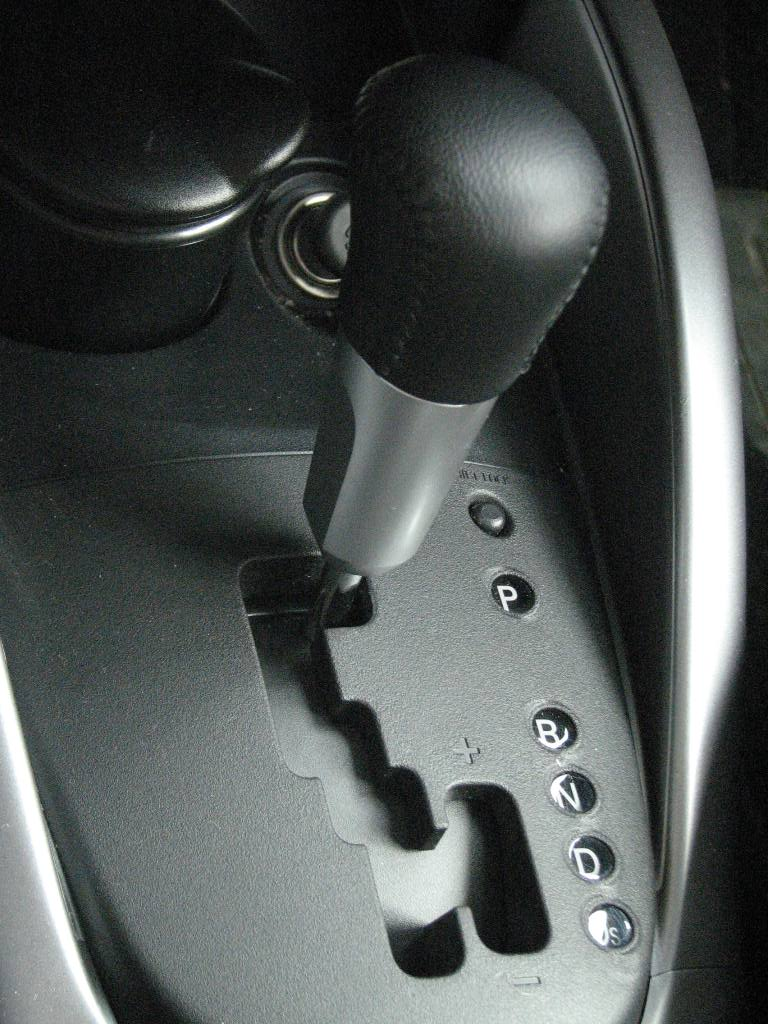
The gear lever on a second generation Mitsubishi Outlander, showing the INVECS-III transmission's standard stepped automatic gate on the left, and the manual sequential shift gate to the right.

INVECS (Intelligent & Innovative Vehicle Electronic Control System) is the brand name used by Mitsubishi Motors for its electronic automatic transmission technology.

== INVECS ==
The first generation of INVECS debuted in the seventh generation of the Mitsubishi Galant, which was introduced in 1992. An array of sensors continuously monitored six parameters and, using "fuzzy logic", adapted the shift patterns in the automatic gearbox "on the fly" according to the driver's style. The four-wheel drive, four-wheel steering, traction control system and suspension were all similarly adapted based on the same sensor data. INVECS would, for example, downshift to increase engine braking while travelling downhill, or similarly automate transmission processes which were previously only controlled manually by the driver.

== INVECS-II ==
Despite sharing its name with the previous system, the second version of INVECS was a radical development, based on Porsche's Tiptronic technology. As with Porsche's version it allowed for either a fully-automatic mode, or a clutchless manual mode if the driver wished to control the up- and down-shift points. It also offered the same Adaptive Shift Control software which monitored and "learned" the driver's habits over time and adjusted the smoothness or aggression of the gearshifts to suit their driving style. It was first implemented in the new Mitsubishi FTO in 1994.

== INVECS-III ==
The third version of INVECS was further advanced, and now offered a continuously variable transmission when in fully-automatic mode, or a simulated six-speed clutchless manual if the driver wished to control the up- and down-shift points. A further innovation for Mitsubishi was the introduction of paddle-shifters allowing the driver to make manual gear changes while their hands remain on the steering wheel.

INVECS-III was introduced in 2000, in the eighth generation of the Mitsubishi Lancer. The paddle-shift option was first seen on the second generation Mitsubishi Outlander which debuted in 2005.
