= Mitsubishi Galant GTO =

Mitsubishi Colt Galant GTO
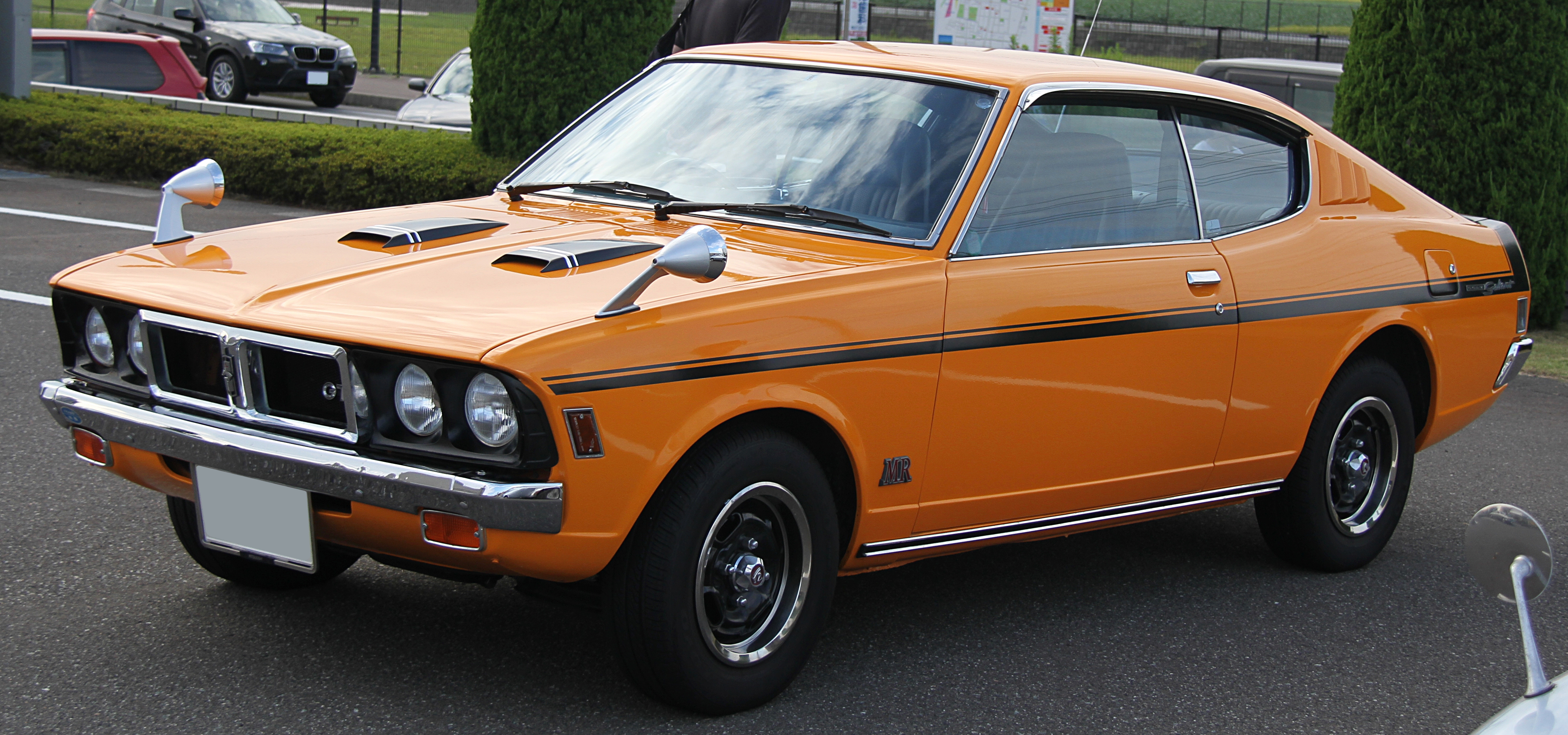

Overview
- Manufacturer: Mitsubishi Motors
- Production: 1970–1977
- Assembly: Japan: Okazaki, Aichi (Nagoya Plant)
- Designer: Hiroaki Kamisago

Body and chassis
- Class: Sports car
- Body style: 2-door hardtop
- Layout: FR
- Related: Mitsubishi Galant (1969–1976); Mitsubishi Galant FTO

Powertrain
- Engine: 1597 cc 4G32 I4 (A53, 1970–1973); 1686 cc 4G35 I4 (A55, 1972–1977); 1995 cc 4G52 I4 (A57, 1973–1977)
- Transmission: 4/5-speed manual; 3-speed automatic

Dimensions
- Wheelbase: 2,420 mm (95.3 in)
- Length: 4,125 mm (162.4 in)
- Width: 1,580 mm (62.2 in)
- Height: 1,310 mm (51.6 in)
- Curb weight: 980 kg (2,160 lb)

Chronology
- Successor: Mitsubishi Galant Lambda

The Mitsubishi Colt Galant GTO (Gran Turismo Omologato) is an automobile which was produced by Mitsubishi Motors from 1970 to 1977. It was first shown as the Galant GTX-1 showcar at the 1969 Tokyo Motor Show. Sales began in November 1970, when it was the flagship hardtop variant of Mitsubishi Heavy Industries's then-new Colt Galant sedan. The nameplate was revived in 1990 for the Mitsubishi GTO, although this name was only used in the Japanese domestic market.

== History ==
The Colt Galant GTO exterior was penned by Hiroaki Kamisago, who had previously been sent by Mitsubishi to study at the Art Center College of Design, then located in Los Angeles, California. The design incorporates a number of stylistic cues from contemporary American muscle cars such as the Mustang, Firebird and Cougar, including a long hood, raised cut-off ducktail rear, and rounded quad-headlamps and tail-lamps. The GTO was Mitsubishi's second production car to have full, roll down, side windows and a pillarless design and after the Toyota T40 series Corona of 1966 and Mitsubishi's own Galant Hardtop launched earlier in 1970; the GTO was the third such Japanese car.

Mitsubishi Racing Development (AKA Colt Speed) intended for the Colt Galant GTO to compete in the prestigious JCCA Grand Prix circuit. However, the OPEC oil embargo of 1973 sounded the demise of GP racing, so the GTO race program was mothballed.

Initially, there were three Colt Galant GTO (A53C) models offered, all powered by the Saturn engine: the M1 (1600 cc SOHC, 4-speed single carb), the M2 (1600 cc SOHC, 4-speed, using twin Mikuni-built Solex carburetors for a total of 110 hp)(SAE).and the top-spec MR (1600 cc twin-carb, DOHC five-speed), a 125 PS (92 kW) version only available in Japan.

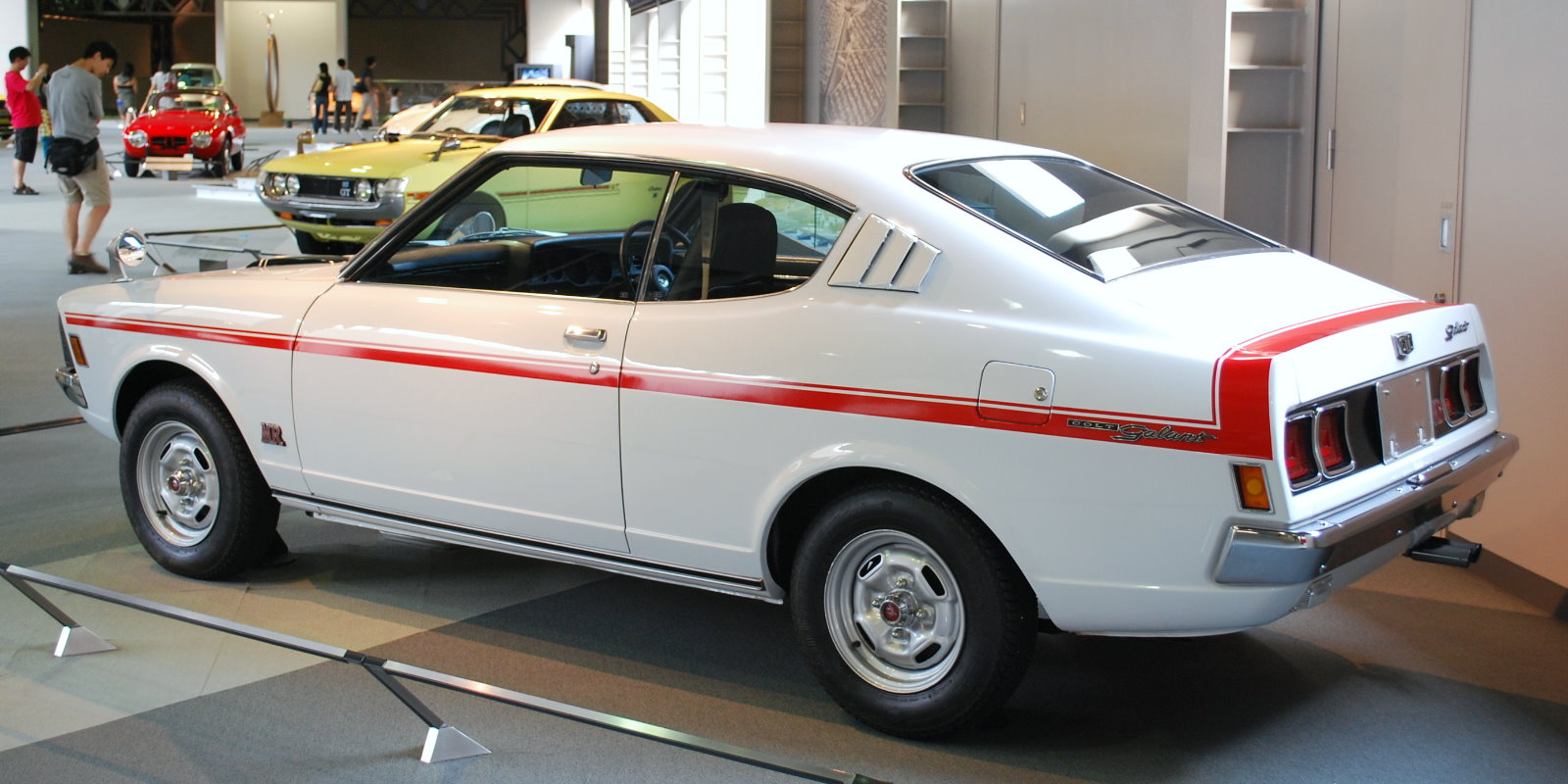
1970 Galant GTO MR, the top-of-the-line version

In February 1972 Mitsubishi upgraded the power plants, replacing the lower powered versions with a somewhat larger (1.7 litre) version of the Saturn engine. These cars received the A55C chassis code, while the twin-cam MR continued to use the smaller but more powerful 4G32 engine until January 1973, when stricter emissions standards made it obsolete. The higher-end versions then received Mitsubishi's all new Astron engine, with either 110 or 125 PS (81 or 92 kW), along with a new A57C chassis code. The range now consisted of the SL (2000 cc single-carb, four- or five-speed manual or automatic transmission), GS-5 (2000 cc twin-carb, 5-speed manual) and GS-R for "Grand Sport Rallye" (2000 cc twin-carb, five-speed manual). The lowest priced 1700 SL model remained with the 1.7, with 105 PS (77 kW). The lineup was also given a mild facelift to signal the changes, comprising a one-piece slats-type grille with a central dividing molding and three-piece tail lights. Additionally, the more sporting GSR had wider 185-section tires, flared guards and a black-painted rear panel between the lights.

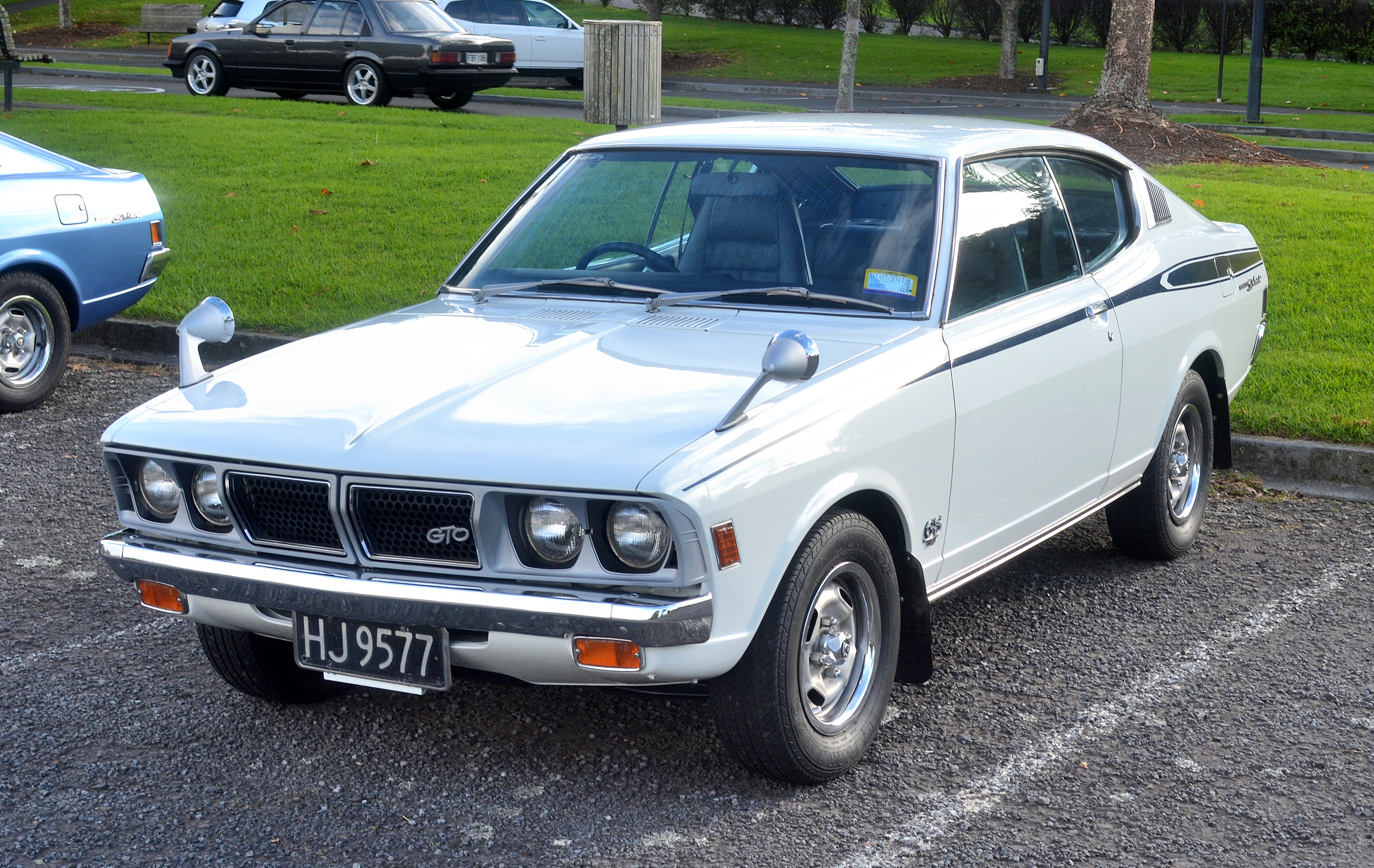
1975 Galant GTO GS; this new grille arrived in 1975

There were some minor adjustments to safety equipment in October 1973, and the automatic transmissions were dropped in August 1974. This was followed by a second styling tweak in February 1975 when the car gained a honeycomb-style front grille, enough to be labelled the "New Galant GTO" in promotional material. Two-litre GTOs built after this date also gained the Astron 80 engine with Mitsubishi's Silent Shaft system, while the four-speed manual transmission was now only available with the smallest engine. In October 1975 the engines were updated with Mitsubishi's MCA emissions control system with an exhaust gas recirculation valve and a thermal reactor, all to pass the upcoming 1976 emissions standards. The four-speed transmission was discontinued entirely at this time, leaving only five-speed manuals. Power was now 97 PS (71 kW) for the 1700 SL-5 and 105 PS (77 kW) for the 2000 SL-5.

The GS-R was briefly unavailable after the late 1975 change, but was revived with a cleaner MCA-80 engine in February 1976, with power now down to 115 PS (85 kW). Three months later the entire range received some minor exterior modifications, with the GS-R receiving a new, large front air dam with a mirrored "GS-R" script. After a relatively long production run, the GTO was finally replaced by Galant Lambda/Sapporo in December 1976, although production continued into 1977.

== Export ==
Mitsubishi chose not to aggressively export the Colt Galant GTO. Besides the home market of Japan, few examples (all right hand drive) were sold abroad. Most were distributed to New Zealand, and smaller numbers ended up in various Asian countries including Papua New Guinea. It was also exported to the United Kingdom and Ireland between January 1975 and late 1976. Retailing at almost £3,000 (£600 more than a Celica GT coupé) it failed make a UK market impact. At the time, Mitsubishi rarely used their own brand name abroad, so all were sold simply as the "Colt Galant GTO". In Japan, the few remaining good examples have reached "collector" money status, recent examples at auction have commanded over ¥1,000,000, with MR variants reaching almost twice that amount.

== GTO name revived ==
After Colt Galant GTO production ceased in 1977, the name lay dormant for 13 years, but it retained sufficient cachet that Mitsubishi resurrected it for their flagship Mitsubishi GTO sports GT in 1990. However, in order to avoid offending automotive connoisseurs, who might have objected to the evocative nameplate from the highly regarded Ferrari 250 GTO (1962), and Pontiac GTO being used on a Japanese vehicle, it was sold as the Mitsubishi 3000GT in overseas markets.
