= Mitsubishi Astron engine =

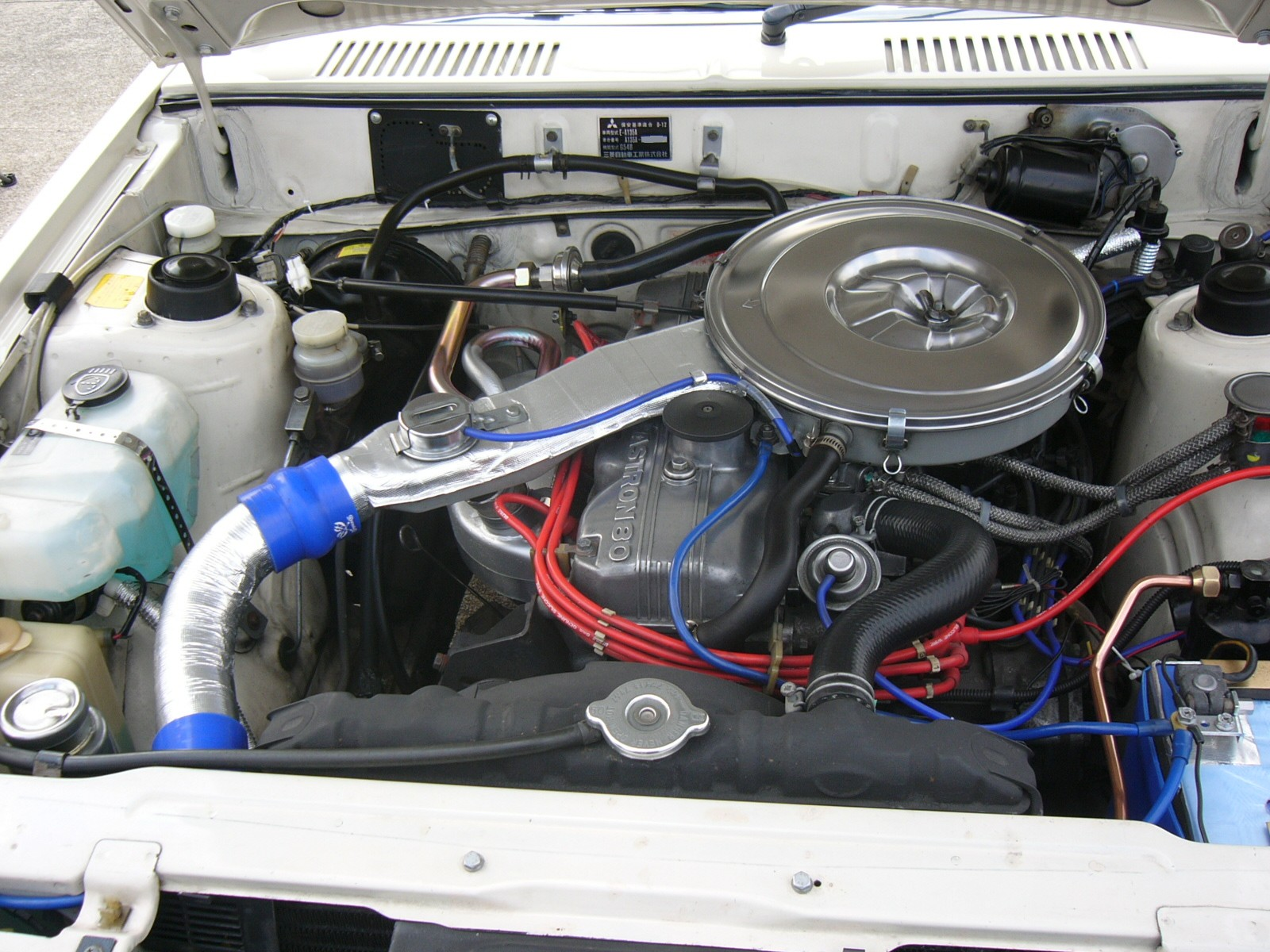
- Mitsubishi G54B engine

Overview
- Manufacturer: Mitsubishi Motors
- Also called: 4G5/4D5
- Production: 1972–Present

Layout
- Configuration: Four-cylinder
- Displacement: 1.9–2.6 L (1,850–2,555 cc)
- Cylinder bore: 84 mm (3.31 in); 88 mm (3.46 in); 91.1 mm (3.59 in)
- Piston stroke: 90 mm (3.54 in); 95 mm (3.74 in); 98 mm (3.86 in)
- Cylinder block material: Cast-iron
- Cylinder head material: aluminium
- Valvetrain: SOHC 2 valves x cyl.; DOHC 4 valves x cyl.
- Compression ratio: 8.8:1-21.0:1

Combustion
- Turbocharger: TD04, TD05 or TF035HL2 variable geometry with intercooler (on some versions)
- Fuel system: Carburetor; Multi-point fuel injection Throttle-body fuel injection Indirect injection Common rail Direct Injection
- Fuel type: Gasoline, Diesel
- Cooling system: Water-cooled

Output
- Power output: 46–178 PS (34–131 kW)
- Torque output: 137–400 N⋅m (101–295 lb⋅ft)

Chronology
- Successor: Sirius 4G64 (Gasoline engine)

The Mitsubishi Astron or 4G5/4D5 engine, is a series of straight-four internal combustion engines first built by Mitsubishi Motors in 1972. Engine displacement ranged from 1.8 to 2.6 litres, making it one of the largest four-cylinder engines of its time.

== Design ==
It employed a hemispherical cylinder head, chain-driven single overhead camshaft (SOHC) and eight valves (two per cylinder). United States passenger car versions had a small secondary intake valve referred to as the "Jet Valve". This valve induced swirl in the intake charge, enabling the use of leaner fuel/air mixtures for lower emissions. It was designed as a cartridge containing the valve spring and seat which simply screwed into a threaded hole in the head, similar to a spark plug but inside the cam cover. The rocker arms for the intake valve were widened on the valve end to accommodate the cartridge, which was equipped with a very soft valve spring in order to avoid wear on the camshaft intake lobe. Modifications to the head were thereby reduced as the Jet Valve negated the necessity for a three-valve-per-cylinder design.

In 1975, the Astron 80 introduced a system dubbed "Silent Shaft": the first use of twin balance shafts in a modern engine. It followed the designs of Frederick Lanchester, whose original patents Mitsubishi had obtained, and proved influential as Fiat/Lancia, Saab and Porsche all licensed this technology.

The 4D5 engine is a range of four-cylinder belt-driven overhead camshaft diesel engines which were part of the "Astron" family, and introduced in 1980 in the then new fifth generation Galant. As the first turbodiesel to be offered in a Japanese passenger car, it proved popular in the emerging SUV and minivan markets where Mitsubishi was highly successful, until superseded by the 4M4 range in 1993. However, production of the 4D5 (4D56) continued throughout the 1990s as a lower-cost option than the more modern powerplants. Until now it is still in production, but made into a modern powerplant by putting a common rail direct injection fuel system into the engine.

== 4G51 (1.85 liters) ==
The 4G51 displaces 1.9 L (1,850 cc).

Applications:

- 1977–1979 Chrysler Sigma (GE)

== 4G52 (2.0 liters) ==
The 4G52 displaces 2.0 L (1,995 cc). Peak power for a 1975 Canter is 100 PS (74 kW), but power increased to as much as 125 PS (92 kW) for the twin-carb version fitted to the Galant GTO GSR and A115 Galant GS-II.

Used an 84 mm × 90 mm (3.31 in × 3.54 in) bore and stroke. In Australia this engine was used in the Sigma, Scorpion and L200.

Applications:
- 1975.01–19?? Mitsubishi Canter (third generation)
- 1977–1981 Mitsubishi Lancer Celeste
- 1973-1977– Mitsubishi Galant GTO (A57)
- 1973-1987 Mitsubishi Galant
- 1973–1987 Mitsubishi Sigma (GE, GH, GJ, GK, GN)
- 1979-1986 Mitsubishi L200/Dodge Ram 50 (L020)
- 1974–1977 Dodge Colt
- 1975–1978 Plymouth Arrow

== 4G53 (2.4 liters) ==
The SOHC eight-valve 4G53 displaces 2.4 L (2,384 cc), with bore & stroke at 88 mm × 98 mm (3.46 in × 3.86 in). Peak power is 110 PS (81 kW) at 5000 rpm, as fitted to the Rosa bus or the Canter cabover truck. This engine shares its dimensions with the contemporary Fuso 4DR1 diesel engine.

Applications

- 1975.01–19?? Mitsubishi Canter
- Mitsubishi Fuso Rosa (2nd generation)
- Mitsubishi Jeep
- Mitsubishi FG30 3-ton forklift; 46 PS (34 kW)

== 4G54 (2.6 liters) ==
The SOHC eight-valve 4G54 (also known as the G54B) displaces 2.6 L (2,555 cc), with bore & stroke at 91.1 mm × 98 mm (3.59 in × 3.86 in). The G54B for the US market had a cylinder head with additional jet valves to improve emissions (MCA-Jet system). The engine was fitted to various Mitsubishi models from 1978 to 1997 and to the American Chrysler K-cars and their derivatives between 1981 and 1987. It was primarily set up longitudinally for use in rear-wheel drive and all-wheel drive platforms but also as a transverse engine in the front-wheel drive platform of the Mitsubishi Magna and Chrysler K platform. Chrysler commonly marketed the engine "Hemi", whereas the Australian-made version was marketed as the "Astron II" and featured "Balance Shaft" technology, which was subsequently licensed to Porsche and other automakers. The original engine featured a Mikuni two-barrel carburetor with a secondary vacuum actuator; later versions adopted EFI. Chrysler commonly paired this engine with its A470 3-speed automatic transmission; in Australia, Mitsubishi adapted it to a 5-speed manual transmission and its "ELC" (Electronic Control) 4-speed automatic transmission, featuring electronic overdrive. Chrysler eventually replaced the 4G54 with its own 2.5 L engine, whereas Mitsubishi replaced it with a 2.4 L engine codenamed 4G64.

Specifications:

=== ECI-Multi ===
Multi-point fuel injection

- 98 kW (131 hp) at 4750 rpm (91 RON)
- 102 kW (137 hp) at 4750 rpm (95 RON)
- 212 N⋅m (156 lb⋅ft) at 3750 rpm (91 RON)
- 220 N⋅m (162 lb⋅ft) at 4000 rpm (95 RON)
- Compression ratio: 9.2:1

=== Carburetor ===
Single two-Venturi downdraught carburetor. 85 kW (114 hp) at 5000 rpm (91 RON), 198 N⋅m (146 lb⋅ft) at 3000 rpm (91 RON). Compression ratio: 8.8:1

Applications:
- 1978-1980 Plymouth Fire Arrow
- 1978-1983 Dodge Challenger/Mitsubishi Sapporo/Plymouth Sapporo
- 1978-1986 Mitsubishi Debonair
- 1979-198? Mitsubishi Canter FC 35
- 1979-1989 Dodge Ram 50
- 1980-1987 Chrysler/Mitsubishi Sigma
- 1981-1985 Dodge Aries/Plymouth Reliant
- 1982-1985 Chrysler LeBaron
- 1982-1985 Chrysler Town and Country
- 1983-1986 Chrysler Executive
- 1982-1991 Mitsubishi Pajero
- 1982-1983 Dodge 400
- 1982-1989 Mitsubishi Starion (turbocharger and Throttle-body fuel injection)
- 1983-1984 Chrysler E-Class
- 1983-1985 Chrysler New Yorker/Dodge 600
- 1984-1987 Dodge Caravan/Plymouth Voyager
- 1984-1986 Dodge Conquest/Plymouth Conquest (turbocharger and Throttle-body fuel injection)
- 1985 Plymouth Caravelle
- 1985-1996 Mitsubishi Magna (1985-1996 TM-TS series carburetor; 1987-1996 TP-TS series Multi-point fuel injection)
- 1986-1989 Mazda B2600
- 1987-1989 Chrysler Conquest (turbocharger and Throttle-body fuel injection)
- 1987-1989 Dodge Raider
- 1987-1998 Jeep Sahra-Pars Khodro Iran
- 1991-1997 Mitsubishi Pajero China market version

== 4G55 (2.3 liters) ==
The 4G55 displaces 2.3 L (2,346 cc).

== 4D55 (2.3 liters diesel) ==
Displacement - 2.3 L (2,346 cc)
Bore x Stroke - 91.1 mm × 90 mm (3.59 in × 3.54 in)
Fuel Type - Diesel
Valves per cylinder - 2

=== Non-Turbo ===
- Power - 55 kW (75 PS) at 4200 rpm (JIS)

48 kW (65 hp) at 4200 rpm (SAE)

- Torque - 147 N⋅m (108 lb⋅ft) at 2500 rpm (JIS)

137 N⋅m (101 lb⋅ft) at 2000 rpm (SAE)

- Engine type - Inline four-cylinder SOHC
- Compression ratio - 21.0:1 (384 psi (26.5 bar))
- Applications
  - 1980-1983 Mitsubishi Galant Σ/Eterna Σ
  - 1982-1986 Mitsubishi Pajero
  - 1982-1986 Mitsubishi Delica/L300
  - Mitsubishi L200/Forte (first generation)
  - 1985-1987 Ford Ranger (first generation)

=== Turbo (TC05 non-wastegated turbo) ===
- Power - 60 kW (80 hp) at 4000 rpm (SAE)
- Torque - 169 N⋅m (125 lb⋅ft) at 2000 rpm (SAE)
- Engine type - Inline 4-cylinder SOHC
- Compression ratio - 21.0:1 (384 psi (26.5 bar))
- Applications - 1980-1983

=== Turbo (TD04 wastegated turbo) ===
- Power - 70 kW (95 PS) at 4200 rpm (JIS)

62 kW (84 PS) at 4200 rpm (DIN)
64 kW (86 hp) at 4200 rpm (SAE)

- Torque - 181 N⋅m (133 lb⋅ft) at 2500 rpm (JIS)

175 N⋅m (129 lb⋅ft) at 2500 rpm (DIN)
182 N⋅m (134 lb⋅ft) at 2000 rpm (SAE)

- Engine type - Inline 4-cylinder SOHC
- Compression ratio - 21.0:1 (384 psi (26.5 bar))
- Applications:
  - 1980-1983 Mitsubishi Galant Σ/Eterna Σ
  - 1980-1984 Mitsubishi Galant Λ/Eterna Λ
  - 1982-1986 Mitsubishi Pajero
  - 1985-1987 Ford Ranger
  - 1983-1985 Dodge Ram 50

== 4D56 (2.5 liters diesel) ==
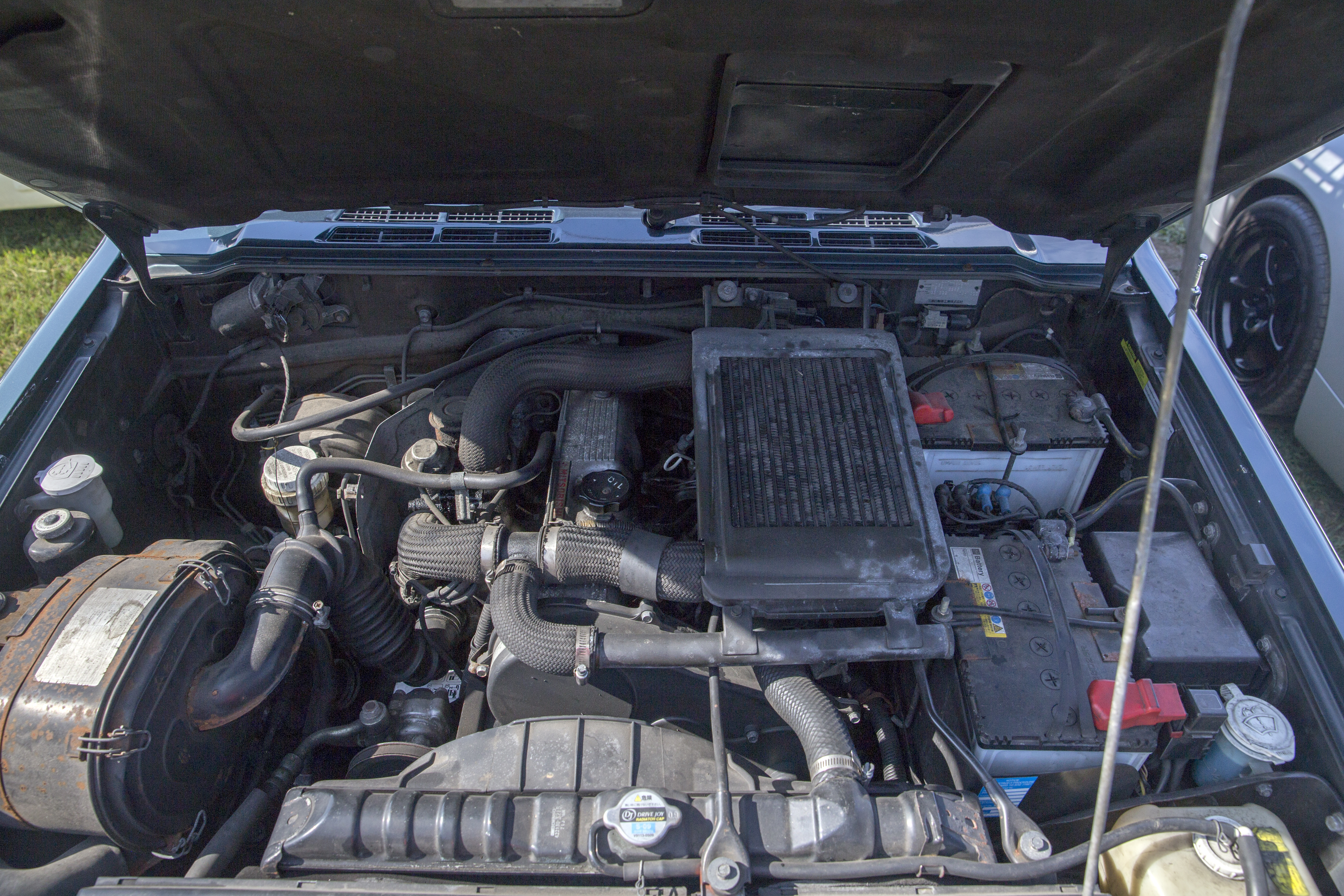
Turbocharged and intercooled 4D56 engine in a 1991 Mitsubishi Pajero

Displacement - 2.5 L (2,477 cc)
Bore x Stroke - 91.1 mm × 95 mm (3.59 in × 3.74 in)
Fuel type - DIESEL

This engine is also built by Hyundai in South Korea, meaning it also sees use in some products made by their Kia subsidiary. Hyundai calls it the D4BA/D4BX (normally aspirated), D4BF (non-intercooled turbo), or D4BH (intercooled turbo).

=== Non-Turbo ===
- Power - 74 hp (55 kW) at 4200 rpm
- Torque - 105 lb⋅ft (142 N⋅m) at 2500 rpm
- Engine type - Inline 4-cylinder SOHC
- Fuel system - Distribution type jet pump
- Compression ratio - 21.0:1

=== Non-intercooled Turbo ===
- Power - 84 PS (62 kW) at 4200 rpm
- Torque - 148 lb⋅ft (201 N⋅m) at 2000 rpm
- Engine type - Inline 4-cylinder SOHC

=== Intercooled Turbo (TD04 Turbo) ===
- Power - 90 hp (67 kW) at 4200 rpm
- Torque - 145 lb⋅ft (197 N⋅m) at 2000 rpm
- Engine type - Inline 4-cylinder SOHC
- Fuel system - Distribution type jet pump
- Compression ratio - 21.0:1

=== Intercooled Turbo (TD04 water-cooled Turbo) ===
- Power - 99 hp (74 kW) at 4300 rpm
- Torque - 177 lb⋅ft (240 N⋅m) at 2000 rpm
- Engine type - Inline 4-cylinder SOHC
- Rocker arm - Roller Follower type
- Fuel system - Distribution type jet pump (indirect injection)
- Combustion chamber - Swirl type
- Bore x Stroke - 91.1 mm × 95 mm (3.59 in × 3.74 in)
- Compression ratio - 21.0:1
- Lubrication System - Pressure feed, full flow filtration
- Intercooler Type - Aluminium Air-to-Air, Top-mounted
- Turbocharger - Mitsubishi TD04-09B

Also known as Hyundai D4BH

=== Intercooled Turbo TF035HL2 (1st Generation DI-D) ===
- Power - 114 PS (84 kW) at 4000 rpm
- Torque - 182 lb⋅ft (247 N⋅m) at 2000 rpm
- Engine type - Inline 4-cylinder
- Fuel system - 1st Generation Common Rail Direct Injection (CRDi)
- Compression ratio - 17.0:1

=== Intercooled Turbo (2nd Generation DI-D) ===
- Power - 136 PS (100 kW) at 4000 rpm
- Torque - 236 lb⋅ft (320 N⋅m) at 2000 rpm.
- Engine type - Inline 4-cylinder DOHC 16 valve
- Fuel system - 2nd Generation Common Rail Direct Injection (CRDi)
- Compression ratio - 17.0:1
- application: Mitsubishi Challenger, Mitsubishi Triton

=== Intercooled Turbo (3rd Generation DI-D with variable geometry turbo) ===
- Power - 178 PS (131 kW) at 4000 rpm
- Torque - Manual transmission: 295 lb⋅ft (400 N⋅m) at 2000 rpm

- Automatic transmission: 258 lb⋅ft (350 N⋅m) at 1800 rpm

- Engine type - Inline 4-cylinder
- Fuel system - 2nd Generation Common Rail Direct Injection (CRDi)
- Compression ratio - 16.5:1
- Turbocharger - Variable Geometry (VG) technology
- application: Mitsubishi Challenger, Mitsubishi Triton

== See also ==
- Mitsubishi Motors engines
- List of engines used in Chrysler products
