= Mitsubishi Saturn engine =

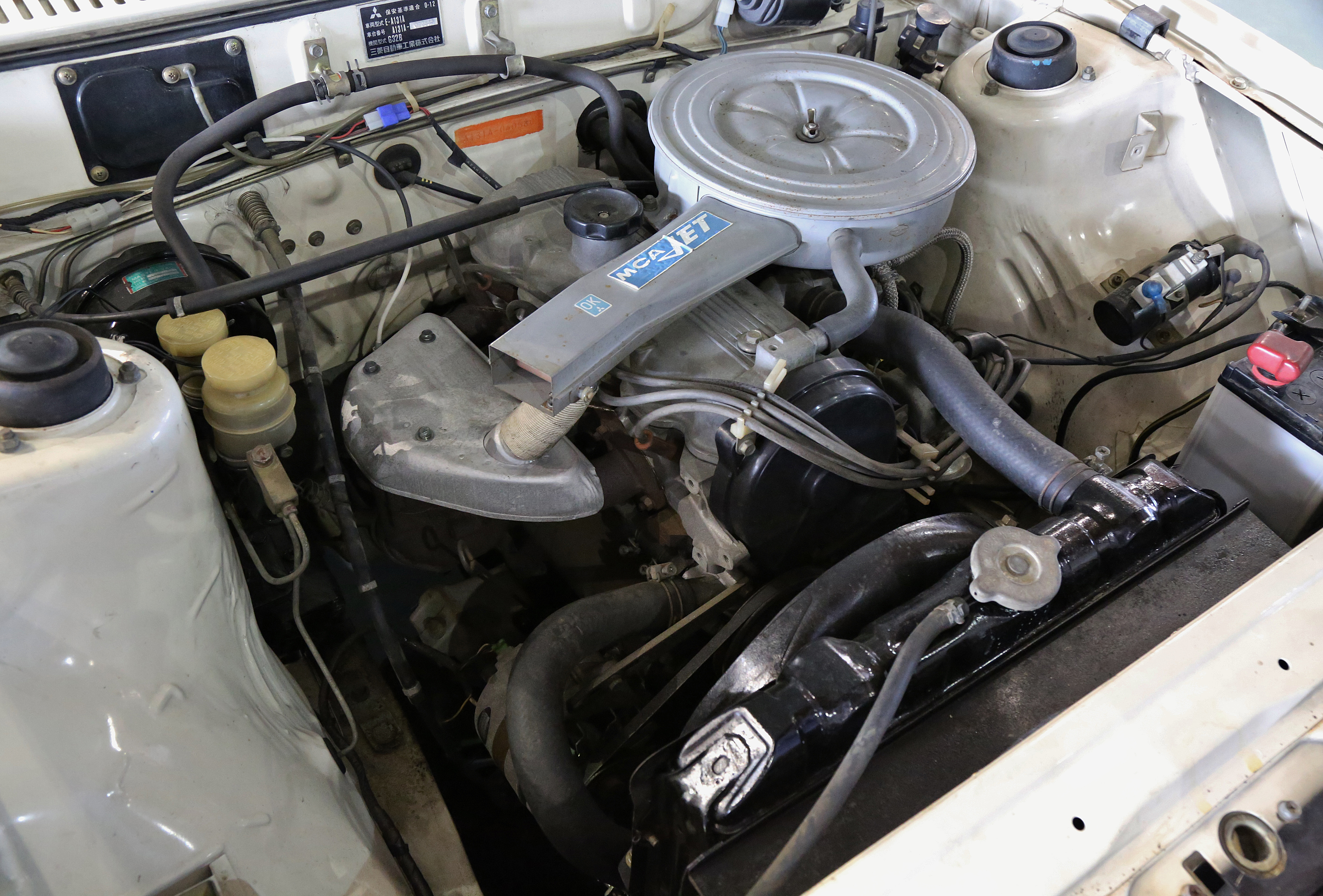

Overview
- Manufacturer: Mitsubishi Motors
- Also called: 4G3
- Production: 1969–1999

Layout
- Configuration: Straight-4 & Straight-6
- Displacement: 1.2–2.0 L (1,239–1,994 cc)
- Cylinder bore: 73 mm (2.87 in); 74.5 mm (2.93 in); 77 mm (3.03 in); 79 mm (3.11 in); 80.6 mm (3.17 in)
- Piston stroke: 74 mm (2.91 in); 77 mm (3.03 in); 86 mm (3.39 in)
- Cylinder block material: Cast iron
- Cylinder head material: Aluminium
- Valvetrain: SOHC & DOHC, 2 valves x cyl.
- Compression ratio: 9.5:1

Combustion
- Turbocharger: On G32B & 4G32T
- Fuel system: Mikuni-built Solex carburetor Central-point EFI
- Fuel type: Gasoline
- Cooling system: Water-cooled

Output
- Power output: 37–115 hp (28–86 kW)

The Mitsubishi Saturn or 4G3 engine is series of overhead camshaft (OHC) straight-four internal combustion engines introduced by Mitsubishi Motors and saw first service in the 1969 Colt Galant. Displacement ranges from 1.2 to 1.8 L (1,239 to 1,755 cc), although there was also a rare 2-litre (1,994 cc) inline-six version built from 1970 until 1976. The early versions have chain driven valvetrain while the later versions are belt driven and equipped with balance shafts.

== 4G30 ==
The 4G30 displaces 1.3 L (1,289 cc). It is an 8-valve SOHC design with an aluminium head and iron block. The engine has five main bearings. Power was 87 hp (65 kW).

Bore x Stroke: 73 mm × 77 mm (2.87 in × 3.03 in)

=== Applications ===
- 1969.12-1971.09 Mitsubishi Galant A I (A51)

== 4G31 ==
The 4G31 displaces 1.5 L (1,499 cc). It is an 8-valve SOHC design with an aluminium head and iron block. The engine has five main bearings. Power was 95–105 hp (71–78 kW) depending on which carburetor combo was used. An updated version with central-point electronic fuel injection was installed in Mirages and Lancers from 1986 on. A version for industrial use has 37 PS (27 kW) at 3000 rpm.

Bore x Stroke: 74.5 mm × 86 mm (2.93 in × 3.39 in)

=== Applications ===
- 1969.12 – 1971.09 Mitsubishi Galant A II, A III (A52)
- 1986–1987 Mitsubishi Mirage
- Mitsubishi FG20 Forklift

== 4G32 ==
In 1970, the 4G32 was introduced, and it displaces 1.6 L (1,597 cc). It is an eight-valve SOHC design with an aluminium head and iron block. The engine has five main bearings, a cross flow head and a single down draught carburetor. Firing order is 1-3-4-2. The GSR versions used two twin-barrel Mikuni-built Solex carburetors for a total of 110 hp (82 kW) (SAE).

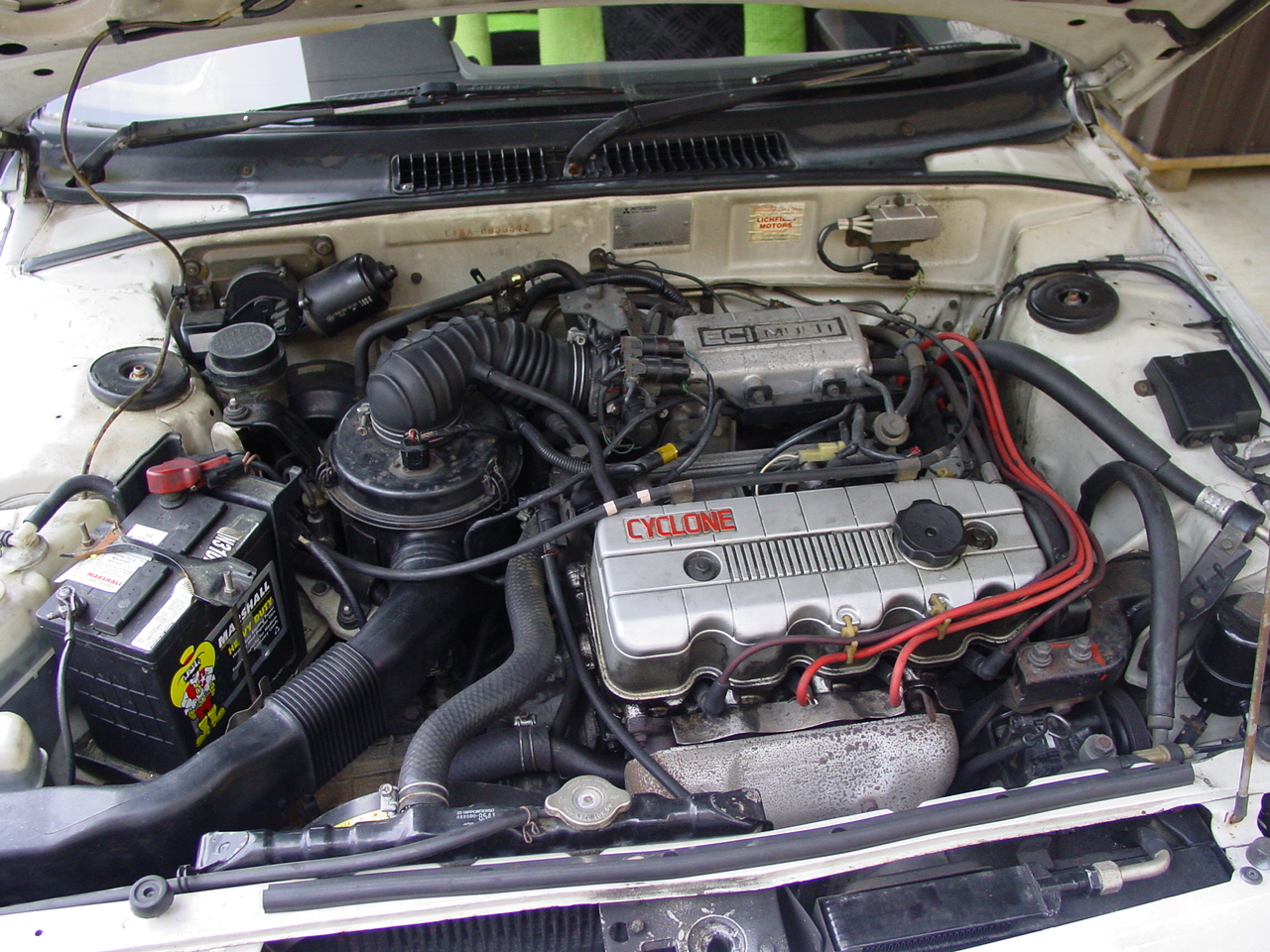
4G32 ECI engine in a Mitsubishi Mirage

A version with an early iteration of Mitsubishi's MCA lean-burn system (MCA-IIB), fulfilling the intermediate Japanese exhaust regulations for 1975, was called G32A. This was built for less than one year, as the new MCA engine arrived in November 1975. Those with the later, cleaner yet, "MCA-Jet" system were called G32B. Later, the G32B also came in a fuel injected, turbocharged model. For competition, a version of the 4G32 engine was made with a DOHC eight-valve cylinder head, and fitted with two twin-choke 40 mm (1.6 in) Solex sidedraft carburettors.

Bore x Stroke: 77 mm × 86 mm (3.03 in × 3.39 in)

Applications:
- Mitsubishi Celeste
- Mitsubishi Galant
- Mitsubishi L200
- Mitsubishi L300
- 1973.02 – 1979.03 Mitsubishi Lancer (A73A)
- 1977.06 – 1979.03 Mitsubishi Lancer (A144A, G32B)
- 1975.03 – 1979.06 Mitsubishi (Lancer) Celeste (A73A)
- 1975.03 – 1975.11 Mitsubishi (Lancer) Celeste (A77A, G32A)
- 1977.07 – 1981.07 Mitsubishi (Lancer) Celeste (A144, G32B)
- 1980–1987 Mitsubishi Lancer EX (A174A)
- Mitsubishi Galant Lambda/Sapporo
- Mitsubishi Sigma
- Mitsubishi Sapporo
- Mitsubishi Cordia
- Mitsubishi Tredia
- Mitsubishi Mirage
- Dodge Colt
- Eagle Vista Turbo
- Hyundai Pony
- Hyundai Stellar
- Mazda Familia
- Plymouth Arrow

=== 4G32T ===
Turbocharged version of the 4G32.

== 4G33 ==
The 4G3 displaces 1.4 L (1,440 cc) from a 73 mm × 86 mm (2.87 in × 3.39 in) bore and stroke. There was also an MCA-Jet equipped G33B developed to fulfill the 1978 Japanese emissions regulations.

Applications:
- Mitsubishi Celeste
- 1979.06-1989.01 Mitsubishi Delica
- Mitsubishi Galant
- 1973.02-1977.06 Mitsubishi Lancer (A72A)
- 1977.06-1978.04 Mitsubishi Lancer (A143A, G33B)
- 1973.09-1979.03 Mitsubishi Lancer (A72V)
- 1975.03-1977.06 Mitsubishi (Lancer) Celeste (A72A)
- 1977.07-1978.03 Mitsubishi (Lancer) Celeste (A143, G33B)
- Hyundai Pony
- Hyundai Stellar
- Plymouth Arrow
- Mitsubishi FG15T Forklift (1979)

== 4G35 ==
The 4G35 displaces 1.7 L (1,686 cc). It is an 8-valve SOHC design with an aluminium head and iron block. The engine has five main bearings. Power was 105–115 hp (78–86 kW) depending on which carburetor combo was used.

Bore x Stroke: 79 mm × 86 mm (3.11 in × 3.39 in)

Applications:

- 1973.01-1973.06 Mitsubishi Galant GS (A55)
- 1972.02-1976 Mitsubishi Galant GTO (A55C)

== 4G36 ==
The 4G36 displaces 1.2 L (1,239 cc). 73 mm × 74 mm (2.87 in × 2.91 in) bore and stroke.

Applications:

- Mitsubishi Celeste
- Mitsubishi Colt
- Mitsubishi Lancer

== 4G37 ==
The 8-valve SOHC 4G37 displaces 1.8 L (1,755 cc).

Bore x Stroke: 80.6 mm × 86 mm (3.17 in × 3.39 in)

Compression Ratio: 9.5:1

Applications:

- Mitsubishi Chariot/Space Wagon 1983–91
- Mitsubishi Cordia
- Mitsubishi Galant
- Mitsubishi Eclipse 1990–1994
- Mitsubishi Lancer/Lancer Fiore/Mirage - 4WD only
- Mitsubishi Tredia

By other brands:

- Eagle Talon DL 1993–1994
- Plymouth Laser 1990–1994

== 6G34 ==
The 6G34, referred to by Mitsubishi as the Saturn 6, is a 12-valve SOHC straight-6 of 2.0 L (1,994 cc) displacement.

The 6G34 was used only in the Mitsubishi Debonair Executive from September 1970 to June 1976, and saw very limited production. Effectively, the design was that of the standard Saturn four-cylinder block with two additional cylinders grafted on to replace the KE64.

Applications:

- Mitsubishi Debonair 1970.09-1976.06 (Japan only)

== See also ==
- List of Mitsubishi engines
- List of Hyundai engines
- List of engines used in Chrysler products
