= Sapporo (disambiguation) =

Sapporo is a Japanese city.

Sapporo may also refer to:

- Sapporo Breweries
- Sapporo Station
- Sapporo Ichiban
- Mitsubishi Sapporo
- Sapporo Television Broadcasting
