= Mitsubishi Galant Lambda =

Mitsubishi Galant Λ (Lambda)
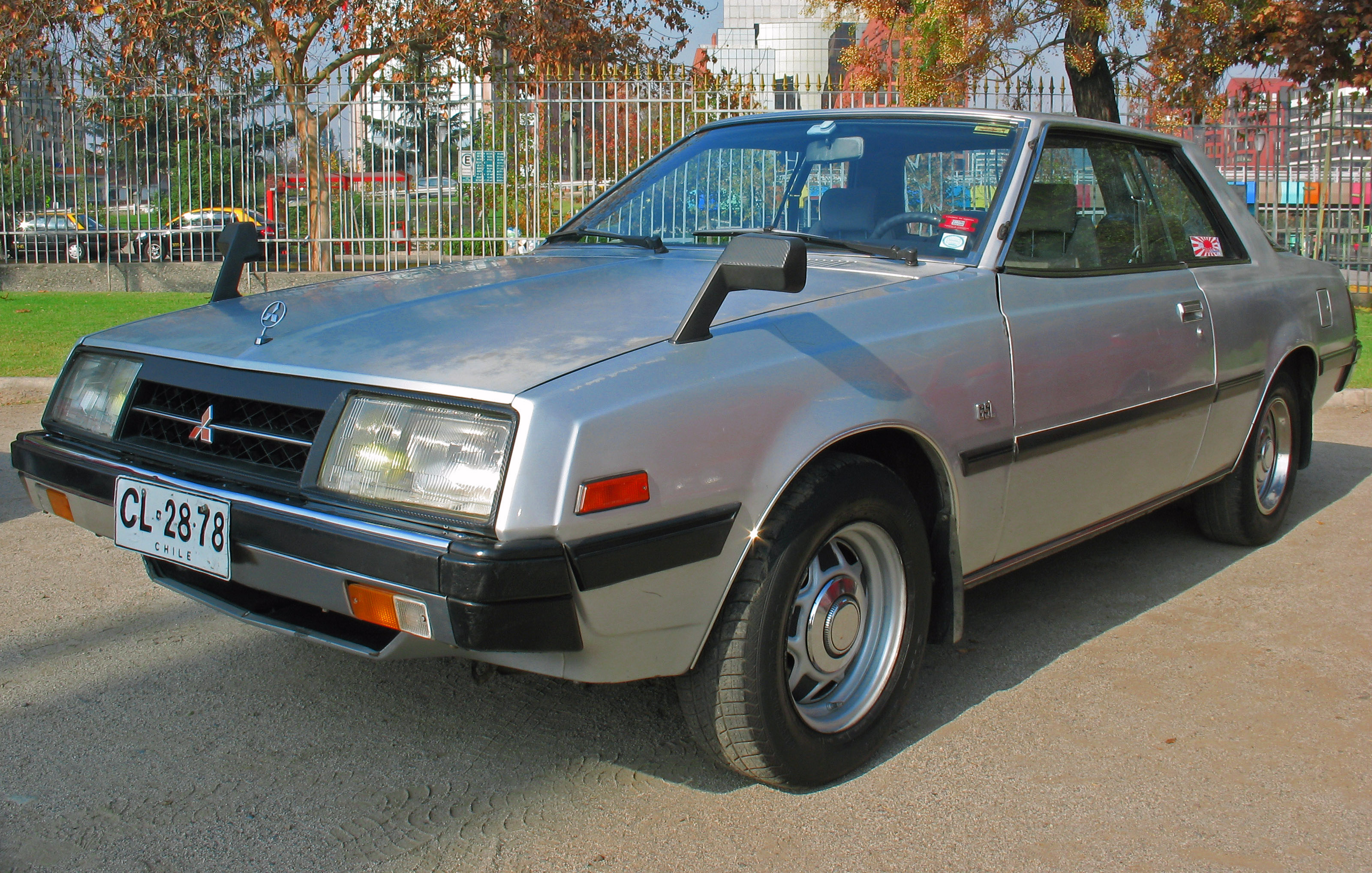
- 1982 Mitsubishi Sapporo 2000 GSL

Overview
- Manufacturer: Mitsubishi Motors
- Also called: Mitsubishi Eterna Λ (Lambda); Mitsubishi Sapporo; Mitsubishi Scorpion; Chrysler Sigma Scorpion; Chrysler Scorpion; Colt Sapporo; Dodge (Colt) Challenger; Plymouth Sapporo
- Production: 1976–1984
- Assembly: Japan: Okazaki, Aichi (Nagoya Plant)

Body and chassis
- Class: Mid-size
- Body style: 2-door hardtop/notchback coupé
- Layout: Longitudinal front-engine, rear-wheel drive
- Related: Mitsubishi Galant

Chronology
- Predecessor: Colt Galant, Galant GTO, Dodge Challenger (1970) (for Dodge Challenger)
- Successor: Starion (Japan); Galant/Eterna Σ hardtop (Europe)

The Mitsubishi Galant Λ (Lambda) is a two-door, four-seat hardtop/notchback coupé built by Mitsubishi from 1976 until 1984. From 1978, it was exported under various names; such as the Mitsubishi Sapporo in Europe and South America (named for the Japanese city of Sapporo, which was considered to have positive international connotations after having hosted the 1972 Winter Olympics), the Dodge (Colt) Challenger and Plymouth Sapporo in North America and Puerto Rico, and the Chrysler Sigma Scorpion, Chrysler Scorpion and later the Mitsubishi Scorpion in Australia. It was also sold as a Sapporo in the United Kingdom under the Colt brand.

For the 1987 model year, Mitsubishi resurrected the Sapporo name for their Mitsubishi Galant Sapporo. However, this version was an unrelated front-wheel drive, four-door sedan.

== History ==
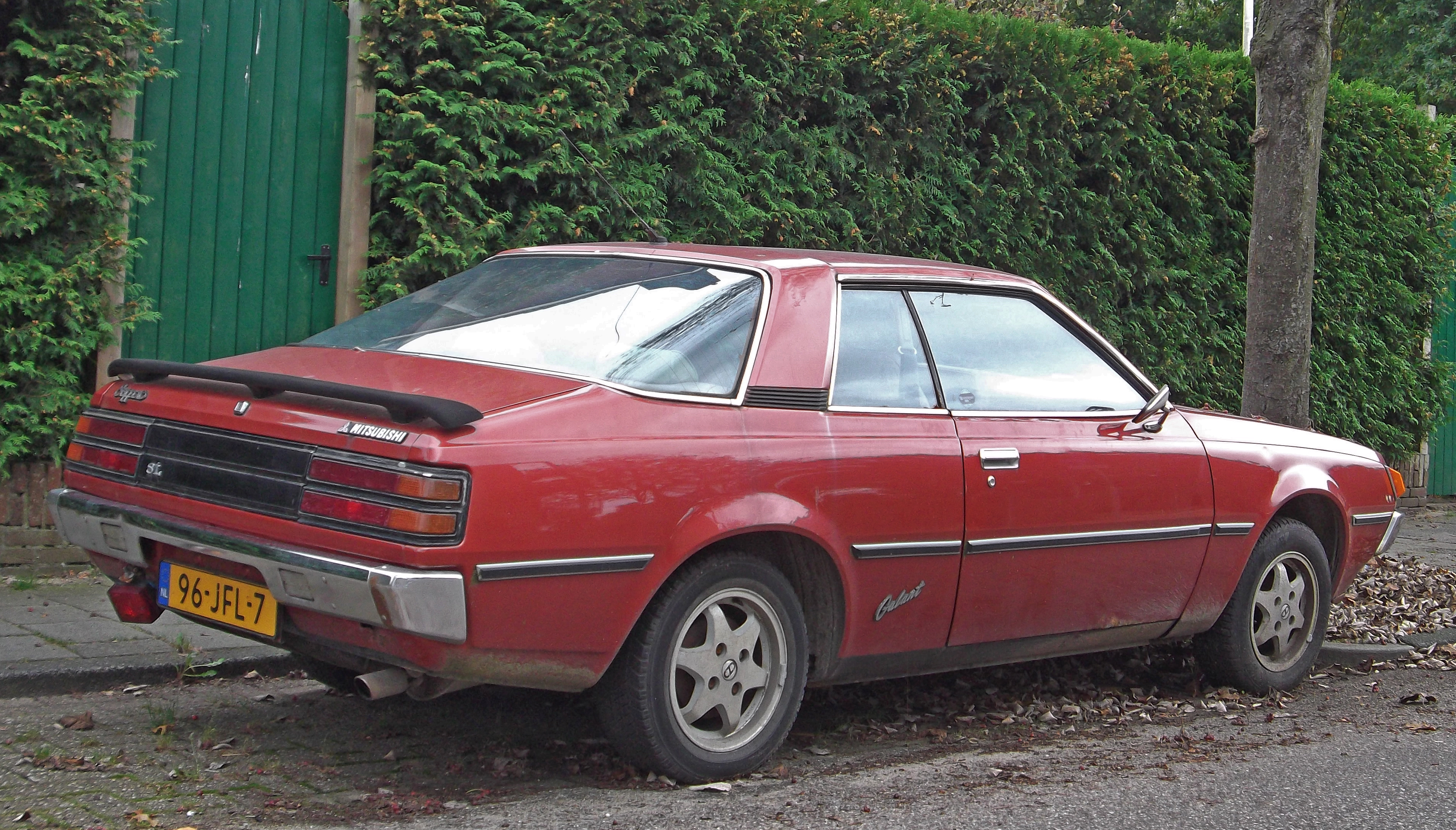
Mitsubishi Galant 1.6 SL (The Netherlands)

Introduced in Japan in December 1976, the Lambda was described not as a coupé but a "personal luxury car", as Mitsubishi already had the Lancer-based Celeste coupé in its line-up. It competed in Japan with the Toyota Crown, Nissan Cedric, Nissan Gloria, and the Mazda Cosmo coupes newly introduced to Japan. In Australia, the car was imported from Japan as a flagship model of Chrysler Australia's successful Sigma range.

Mitsubishi Galant Λ (Lambda) - 1st gen
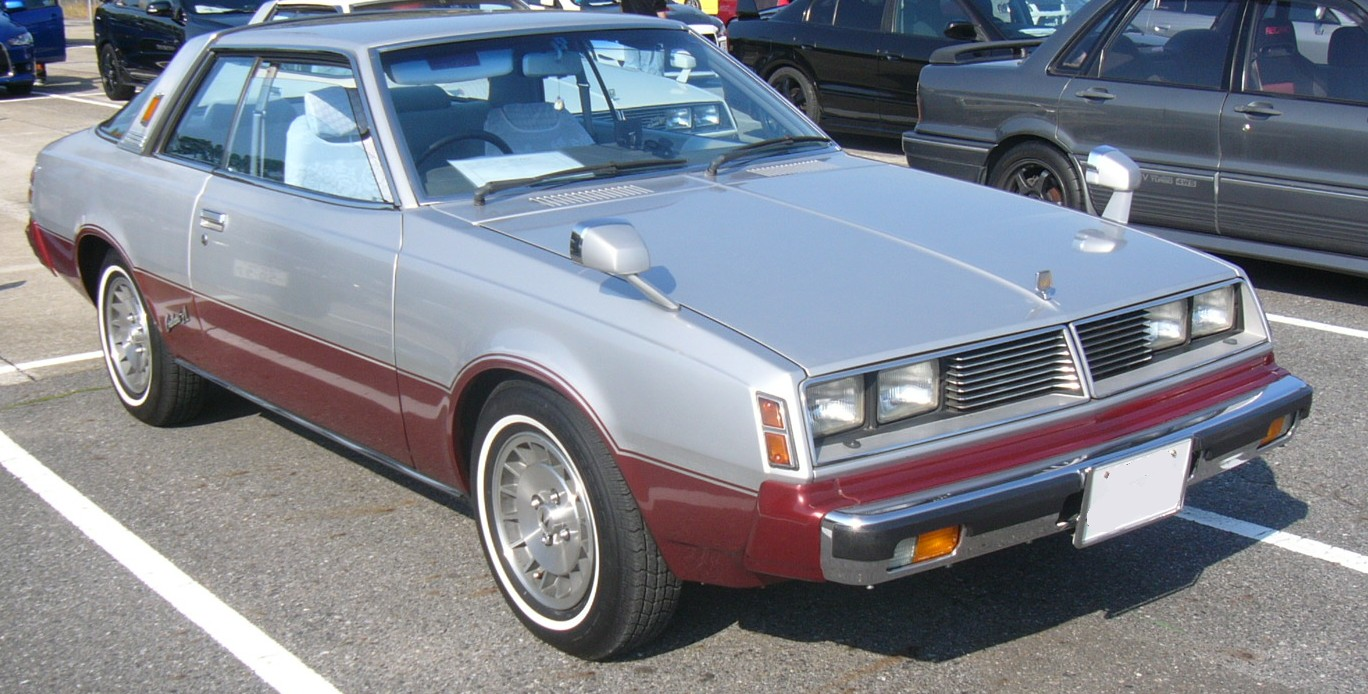
- 1976–1980 Japanese-market Mitsubishi Galant Lambda

Overview
- Manufacturer: Mitsubishi Motors
- Production: 1976–1980

Powertrain
- Engine: 1.6 L 4G32 I4; 1.8 L 4G62 I4; 2.0 L 4G52 I4; 2.0 L 4G63T turbo I4; 2.6 L 4G54 I4; 2.3 L 4D55 turbodiesel I4
- Transmission: 5-speed manual 3-speed automatic

Dimensions
- Wheelbase: 2,515 mm (99.0 in)
- Length: 4,510 mm (177.6 in)
- Width: 1,675 mm (65.9 in)
- Height: 1,330 mm (52.4 in)
- Curb weight: 1,035–1,105 kg (2,282–2,436 lb)

Mitsubishi Galant Λ (Lambda) - 2nd gen
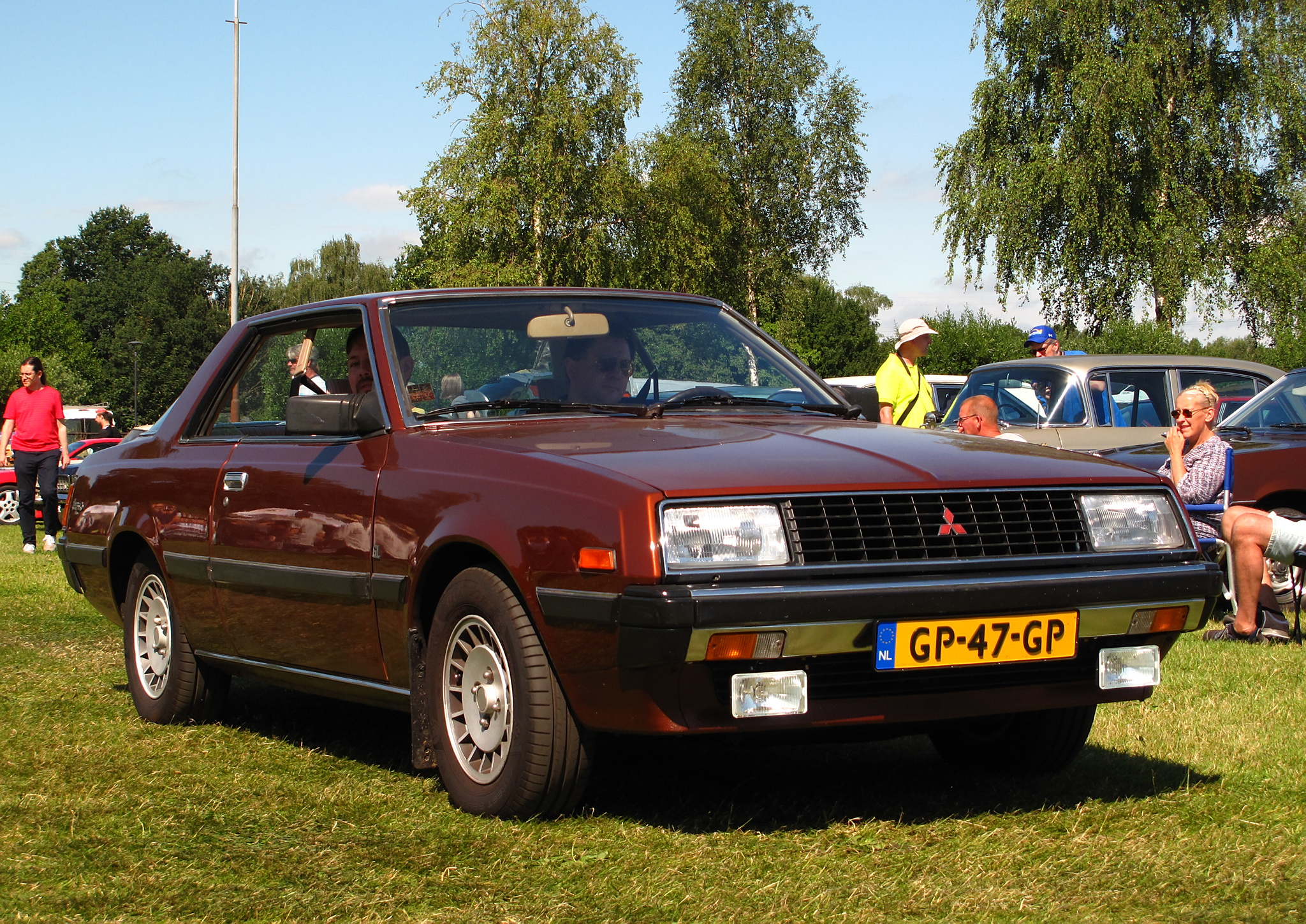
- 1981 Mitsubishi Sapporo 2000 GL

Overview
- Manufacturer: Mitsubishi Motors
- Production: 1980–1983

Dimensions
- Wheelbase: 2,530 mm (99.6 in)
- Length: 4,650 mm (183.1 in)
- Width: 1,700 mm (66.9 in)
- Height: 1,355 mm (53.3 in)
- Curb weight: 1,148–1,205 kg (2,531–2,657 lb)

== Styling ==
In the mid-1970s, smaller personal luxury cars were a growing trend. Pursuing this market segment, the Lambda/Sapporo featured frameless door glass with no B pillar between the front and rear side windows, canopy vinyl roofs, velour upholstered interiors, wheel covers with whitewall tires, and numerous power assists.

In 1980, the second generation featured styled steel wheels with blackwall tires, less chrome trim and interior courtesy lights, a fuse box with fuse built-in test light and under seat as well as console storage —' and a radio antenna incorporated into the trunk lid.

The wheelbase and bodywork were lengthened with a revised roofline while remaining within the Japanese Government dimension regulations. Revisions offered increased shoulder room, front and rear leg room, headroom and trunk capacity — and merited a new chassis code, shifting from A120 to A160. The shifter was moved closer to the driver, and ventilation was improved. The interior provided additional carpeting, acoustic dampening materials, and a double-thickness front bulkhead.

== Mechanicals ==
Japanese-market Mitsubishi Galant Lambda GSR Turbo

The Mitsubishi Galant Lambda was available with a variety of engines, including diesel, several normally aspirated gasoline engines, and one of the earliest applications of the long-running turbocharged 2.0 L 4G63T engine in the top GSR model which also featured independent rear suspension. It was available in the North American market in one basic configuration, which combined the GSR's close-ratio transmission, a live axle rear suspension, and a larger engine. Rear disc brakes and alloy wheels were available together as a package. Other US options were minimal; air conditioning, cassette player, automatic transmission, cruise control, power door locks, power mirrors, power windows, and a moonroof.

The American, Australian, and Japanese-market 2.6 L Astron engine helped introduce Mitsubishi's then-new Silent Shaft balance shaft engine technology, which minimized the inherent vibration of a large four-cylinder in-line engine. Japanese buyers were liable for more annual road tax for selecting the 2.6 L engine over the smaller engines. The US version also featured a "Jet Valve", a small secondary intake valve that improved emissions by enhancing swirl in the combustion chamber, allowing for utilizing of a leaner fuel mixture. A similar engine without the Jet Valve was available in Mitsubishi-built trucks and the Canadian versions of the Sapporo/Challenger. It was also used in many Chrysler K-cars and their derivatives.

Beginning in 1980, Japanese versions were available with electronic fuel injection, or a new 2.3 L Astron turbodiesel engine.

The suspension was revised for the 1980 model year (the second generation), with improved geometry in front and an all-new four-link rear suspension. The turbo models were introduced, of which some came with independent rear suspension (as later applied to the Starion). The second generation also brought variable-assist power steering, which provided increased assistance at low speeds and less at higher speeds. It was also slightly bigger, with increased foot room, headroom, and luggage space.

The Galant Lambda GSR was a predecessor to the more sporting Mitsubishi Starion based on the same chassis and drivetrain. The Starion continued the rear-wheel-drive Galants' model codes, being called the A180, while the new front-wheel-drive Galants started afresh from E10.

== North America ==
The car was marketed in North America as a captive import of the Dodge and Plymouth divisions of Chrysler. The cars differed only in minor details, such as taillights, interior trim, and available colors. Although mechanically identical, the Dodge Colt Challenger was positioned to appeal to the performance segment, while the Plymouth Sapporo (which, rather oddly for a captive import, was named after a Japanese city) targeted the luxury market. The earliest Dodge Colt Challengers were available only in a two-tone silver/charcoal paint to enhance its sportier nature. For the 1979 model year, four more color combinations became available. Equipment was complete for the time, with remote opening trunk, electrically controlled exterior mirrors, map lights, crushed velour seats, etcetera. Optional four-wheel disc brakes were available on larger-engined cars, as part of the "Open Road" package (which also added alloy wheels); both engines were available with a five-speed manual or a three-speed automatic.

As in other markets, the Challenger/Sapporo received all-new bodywork for the 1981 model year. Originally a 1.6 L four was also available, but the second generation North American market cars received only the 2.6 L inline-four with balance shafts and 105 hp (78 kW). The Dodge versions became simply the Dodge Challenger after 1981, dropping the "Colt" part of the name. An electric sunroof was also new.

Although the car received generally positive reviews, it was unsuccessful in the United States. The Challenger and Sapporo were discontinued after the 1983 model year to make way for the products of the newly formed Chrysler-Mitsubishi joint venture, Diamond-Star Motors, as well as the entrance of Mitsubishi into the American market under its name. The same platform and 2.6 L engine under the Challenger and Sapporo were continued through 1989 as the Conquest sports car.

== Gallery ==
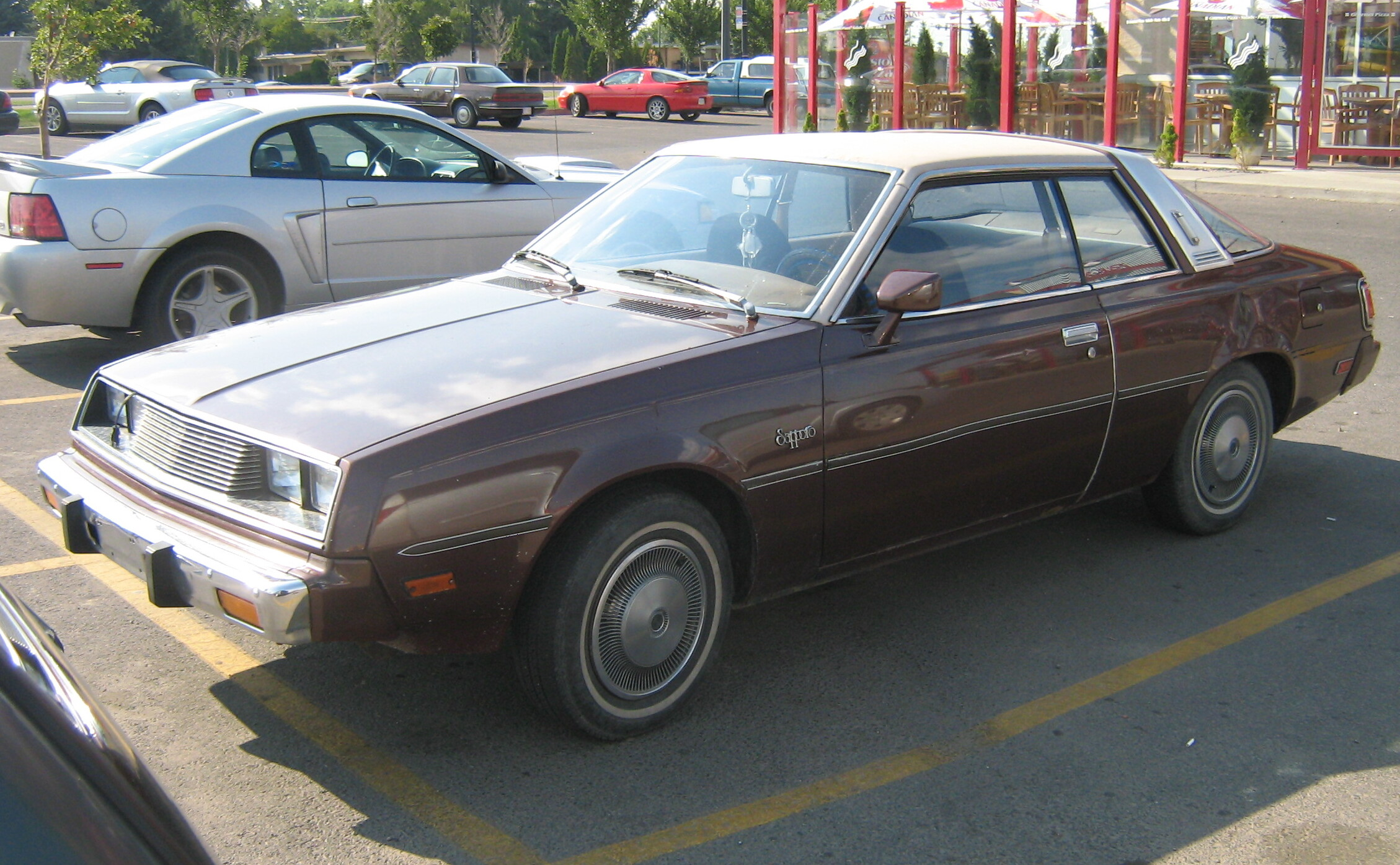
Front-view of a first generation Plymouth Sapporo

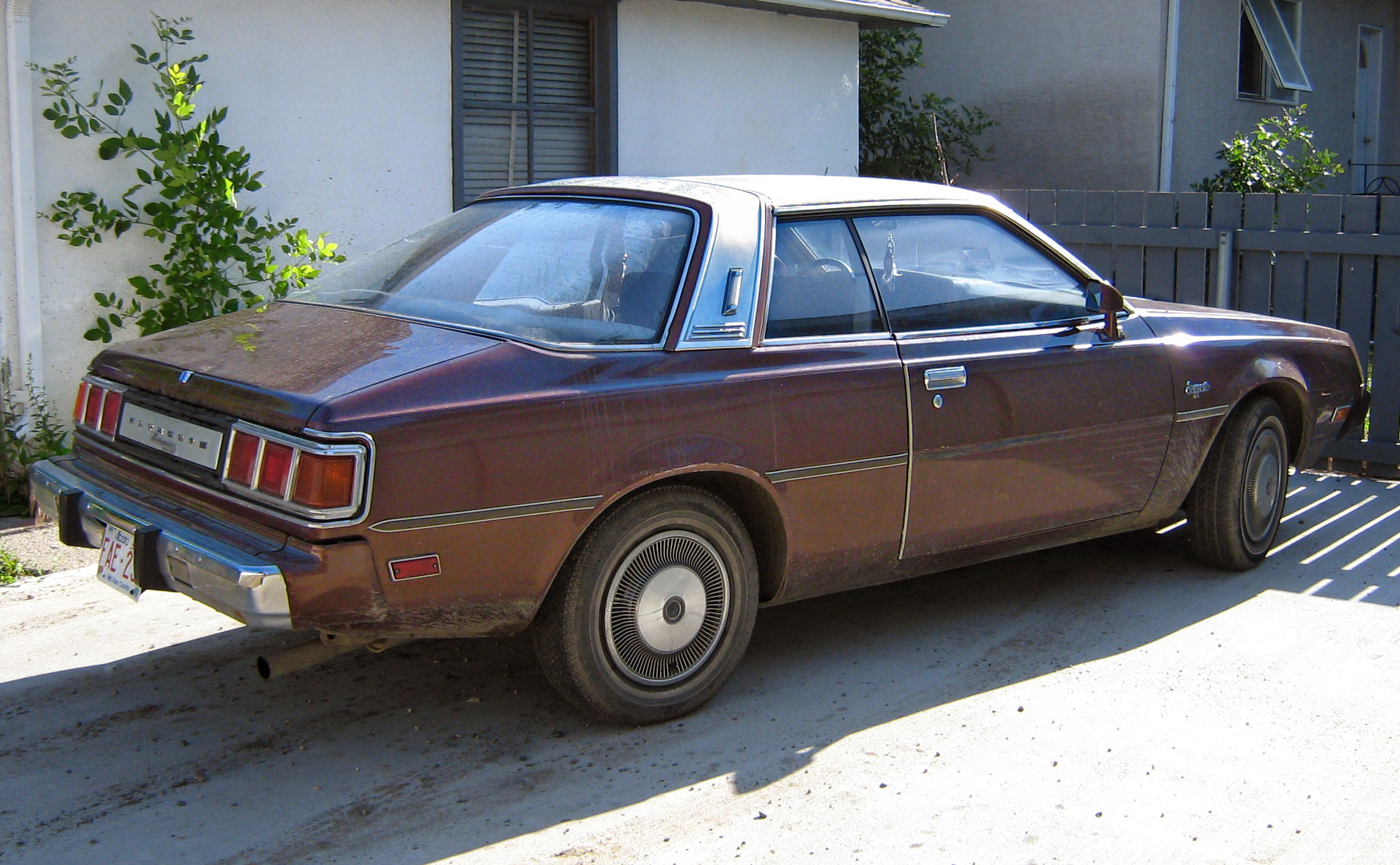
Rear-view of a first generation Plymouth Sapporo

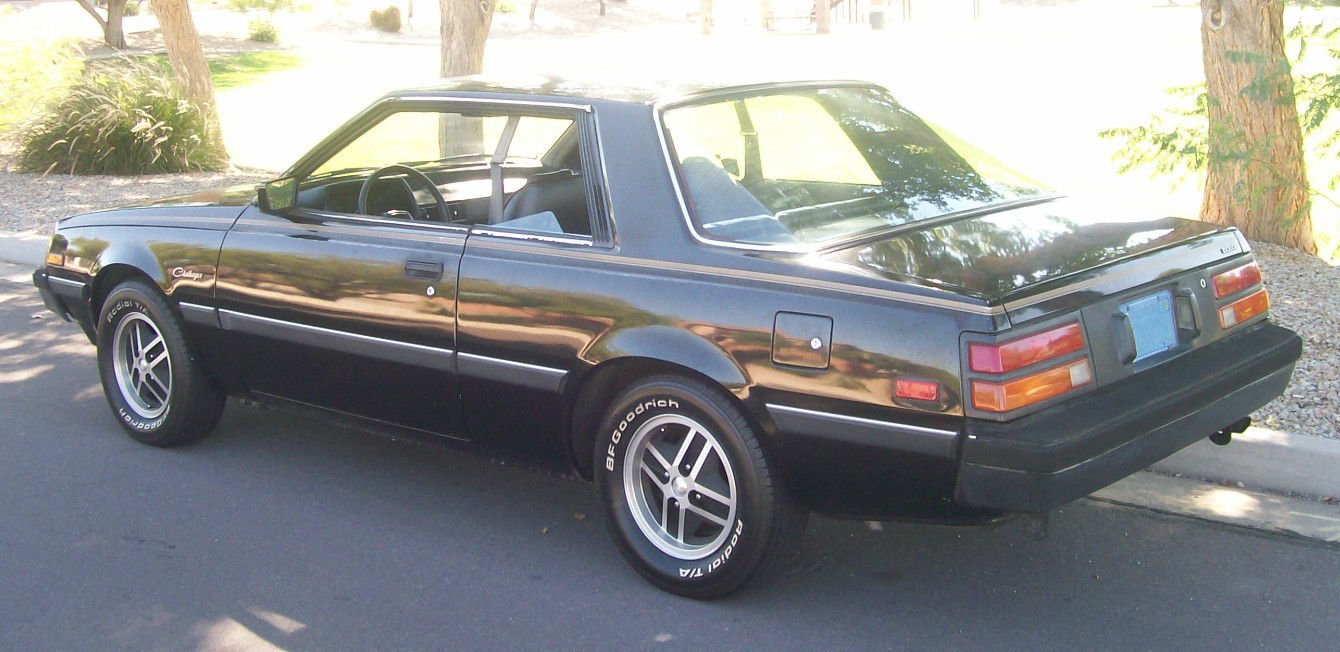
1982 Dodge Challenger (unmodified example of second generation of the Mitsubishi-based Challenger)
