= Hyundai Stellar =

South Korean family car

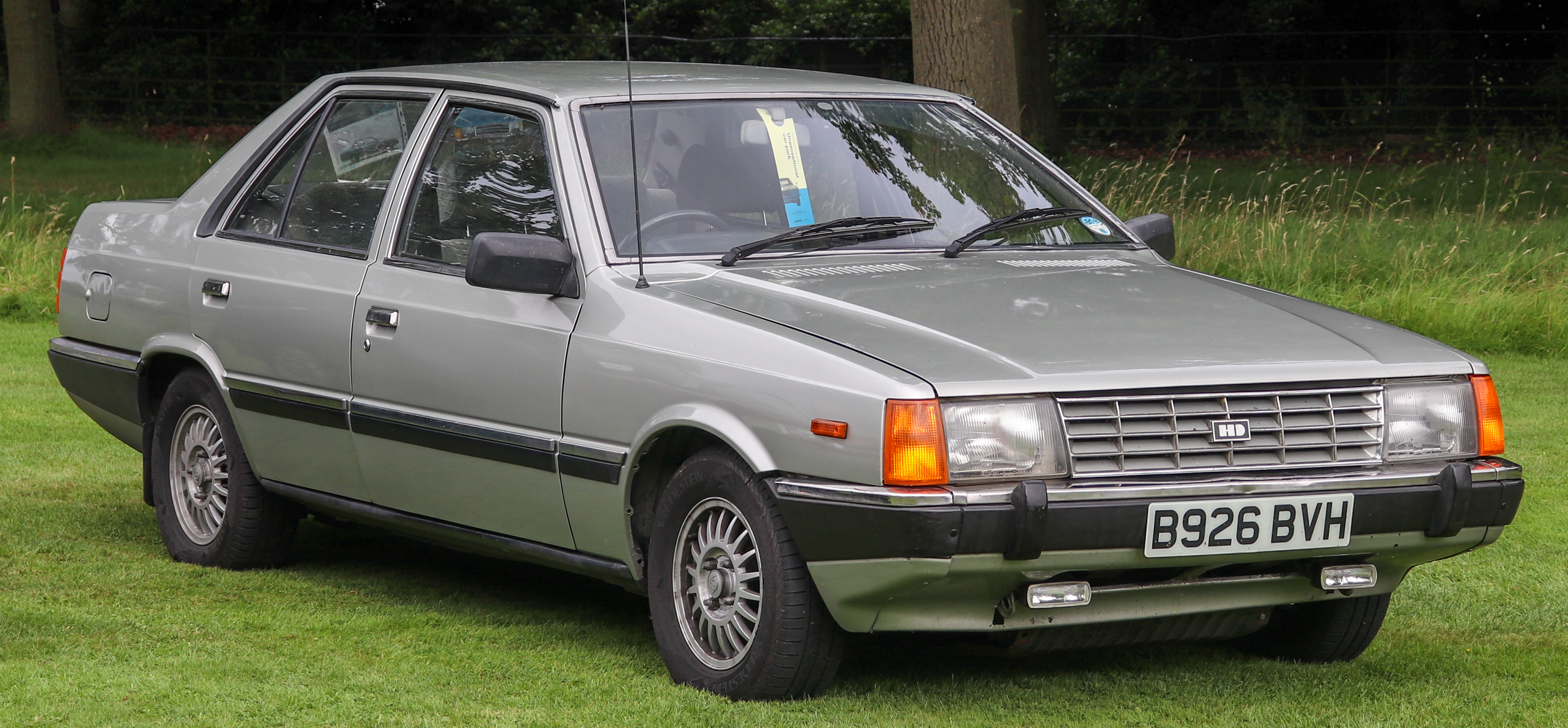

Overview
- Manufacturer: Hyundai
- Production: May 1983 – April 1992 (until January 1997 for LPG Taxi models)
- Assembly: South Korea: Ulsan
- Designer: Giorgetto Giugiaro at Italdesign

Body and chassis
- Class: Mid-size car (D)
- Body style: 4-door saloon
- Layout: Front-engine, rear-wheel drive layout
- Related: Ford Cortina Mark V Ford Taunus TC

Powertrain
- Engine: 1.4 L Mitsubishi 4G33 I4 (1983–1987); 1.5 L Mitsubishi 4G31 I4 (1984–1990); 1.6 L Mitsubishi 4G32 I4 (1983–1990); 1.8 L Mitsubishi 4G62 I4 (1990–1997); 2.0 L Mitsubishi 4G63 I4 (1987–1997)
- Transmission: 4-speed Mitsubishi KM119 manual 5-speed Mitsubishi KM119 manual 3-speed Borg-Warner 03-55L automatic 4-speed Borg-Warner 03-71 automatic with overdrive (1987–1992 models only)

Dimensions
- Wheelbase: 2,579 mm (101.5 in)
- Length: 4,416 mm (173.9 in)
- Width: 1,716 mm (67.6 in)
- Height: 1,372 mm (54.0 in)
- Curb weight: 1,000 kg (2,204 lb)

Chronology
- Predecessor: Ford Cortina
- Successor: Hyundai Elantra; Hyundai Sonata

The Hyundai Stellar (Hangul: 현대 스텔라) is a large family car produced by the South Korean Hyundai Motor Company from July 1983 until the 1992 model year. It succeeded the Ford Cortina, which Hyundai had built under license. The Stellar was designed by Giorgetto Giugiaro using a rear-wheel drive chassis from the Cortina Mark V.

== Technology ==
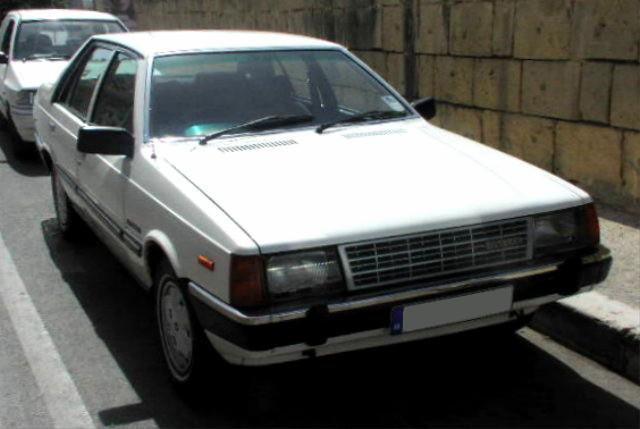
1983 Hyundai Stellar

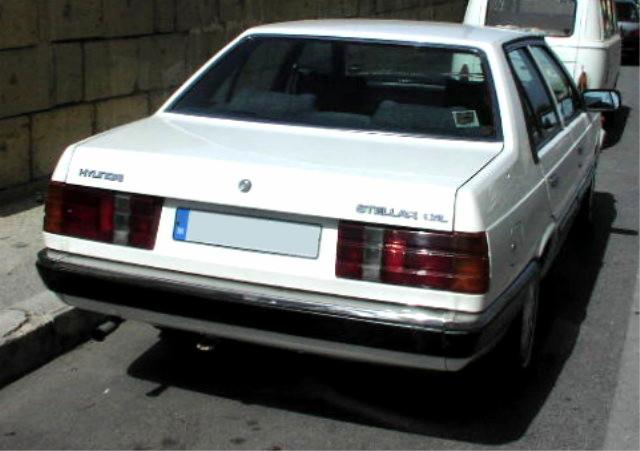
1983 Hyundai Stellar (rear view)

The engine and transmission were licensed by Mitsubishi Motors. Engines available were 1.4 L (4G33, same as the Hyundai Pony) and 1.6 L (4G32) inline-fours until 1986, using either a KM119 4- or 5-speed manual or a Borg-Warner 03-55L 3-speed automatic and a 2.0 L engine in 1987.

1985 Hyundai Stellar CXL

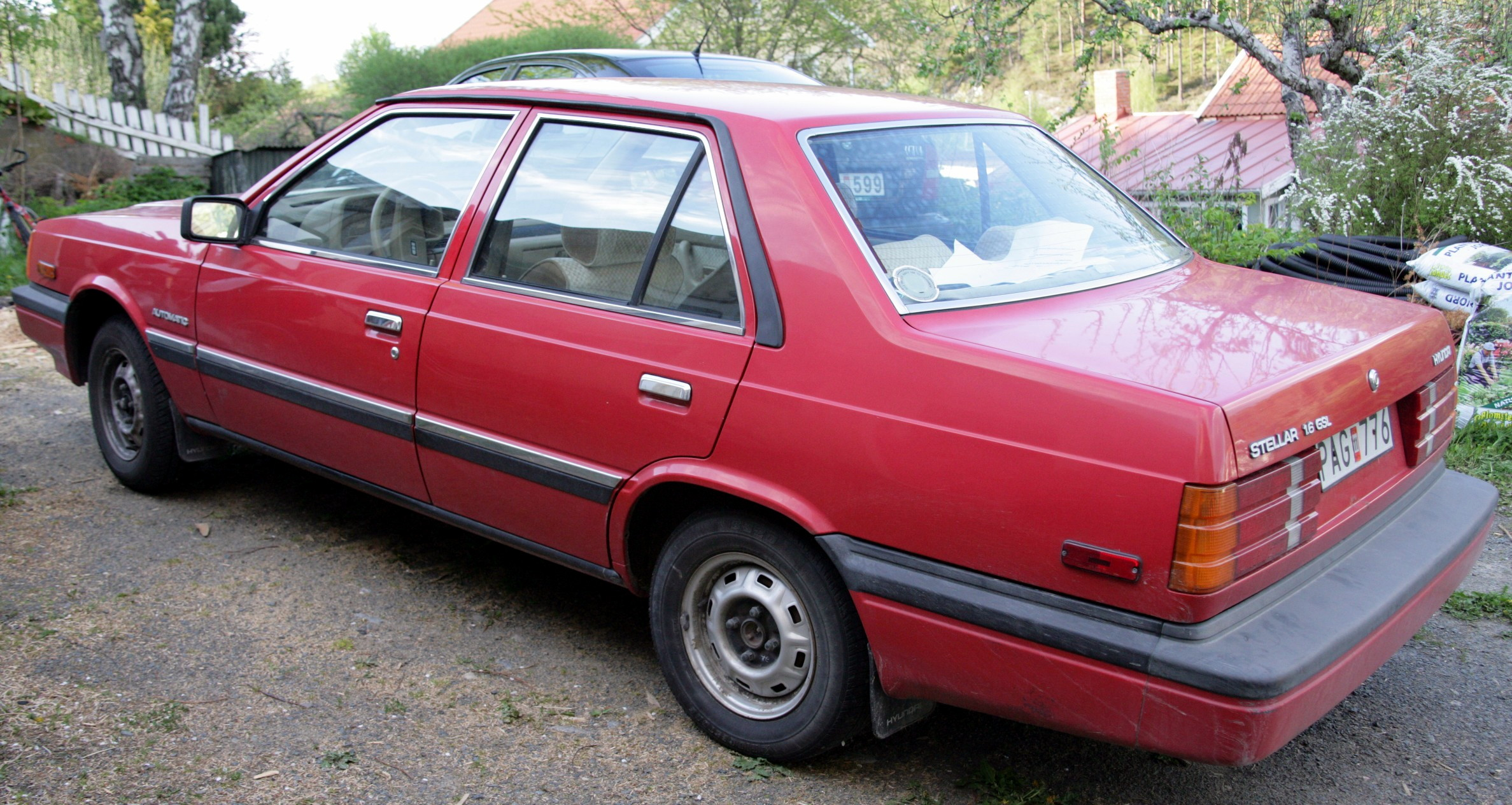
1987 Hyundai Stellar 1.6 GSL Automatic (rear view)

Trim levels included L (base), GL/CL/SL, and CXL/GSL. The CXL/GSL featured power windows, locks and mirrors, remote fuel door, remote boot, premium sound system, full instrumentation (speed, tach, fuel, water temp, volts, and oil pressure), headlamp washers, and available air conditioning. The Stellar's Ford genes and conventional design led many British observers to compare it with the then recently discontinued Cortina - where conservative buyers were scared off by the Sierra's radical styling, a fact played upon by Hyundai's advertising agency with print advertisements depicting a jelly mould shaped like the Sierra above a picture of the Stellar. Like the Cortina, the Stellar also has wishbone suspension up front with a coil-sprung live rear axle. As well as being comparable to the Cortina, which had been Britain's best-selling car, it also found favour with buyers due to its competitive asking price, which meant that it was priced comparably to a smaller Escort rather than a Sierra. It was sold in the UK from June 1984 until the arrival of the Lantra in 1991. It was the second Hyundai model to be imported to Europe, two years after the launch of the smaller Pony.

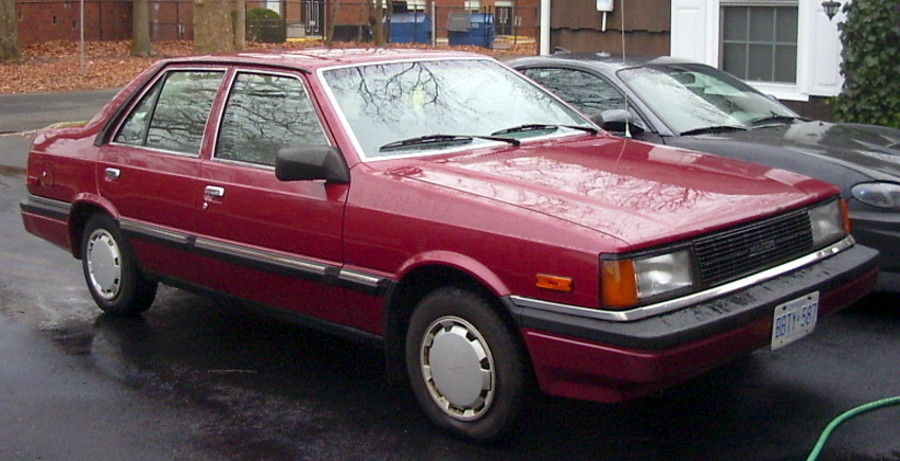
1987 Hyundai Stellar CXL (Canada)

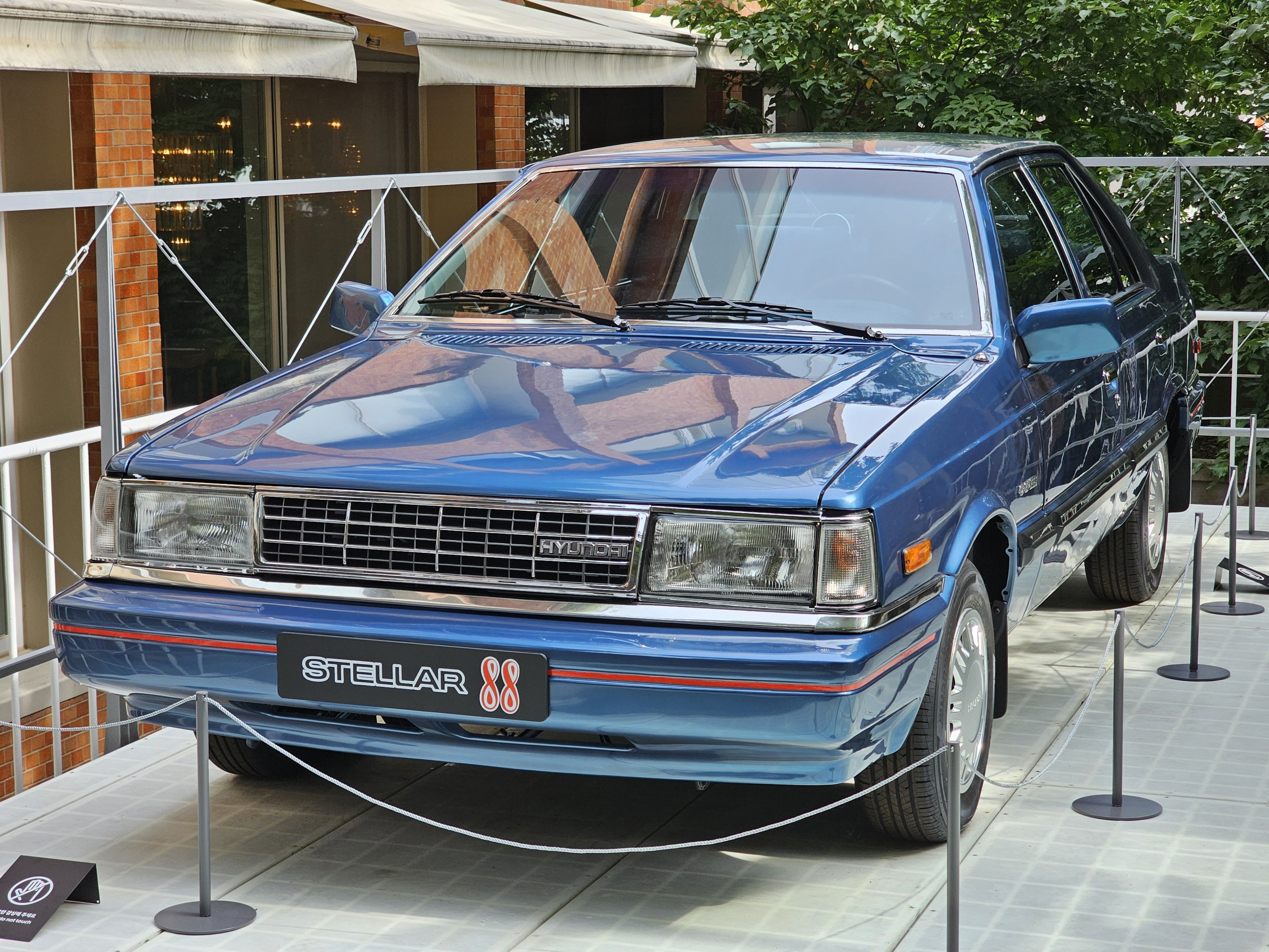
1988 Hyundai Stellar 1.5 88 (South Korea)

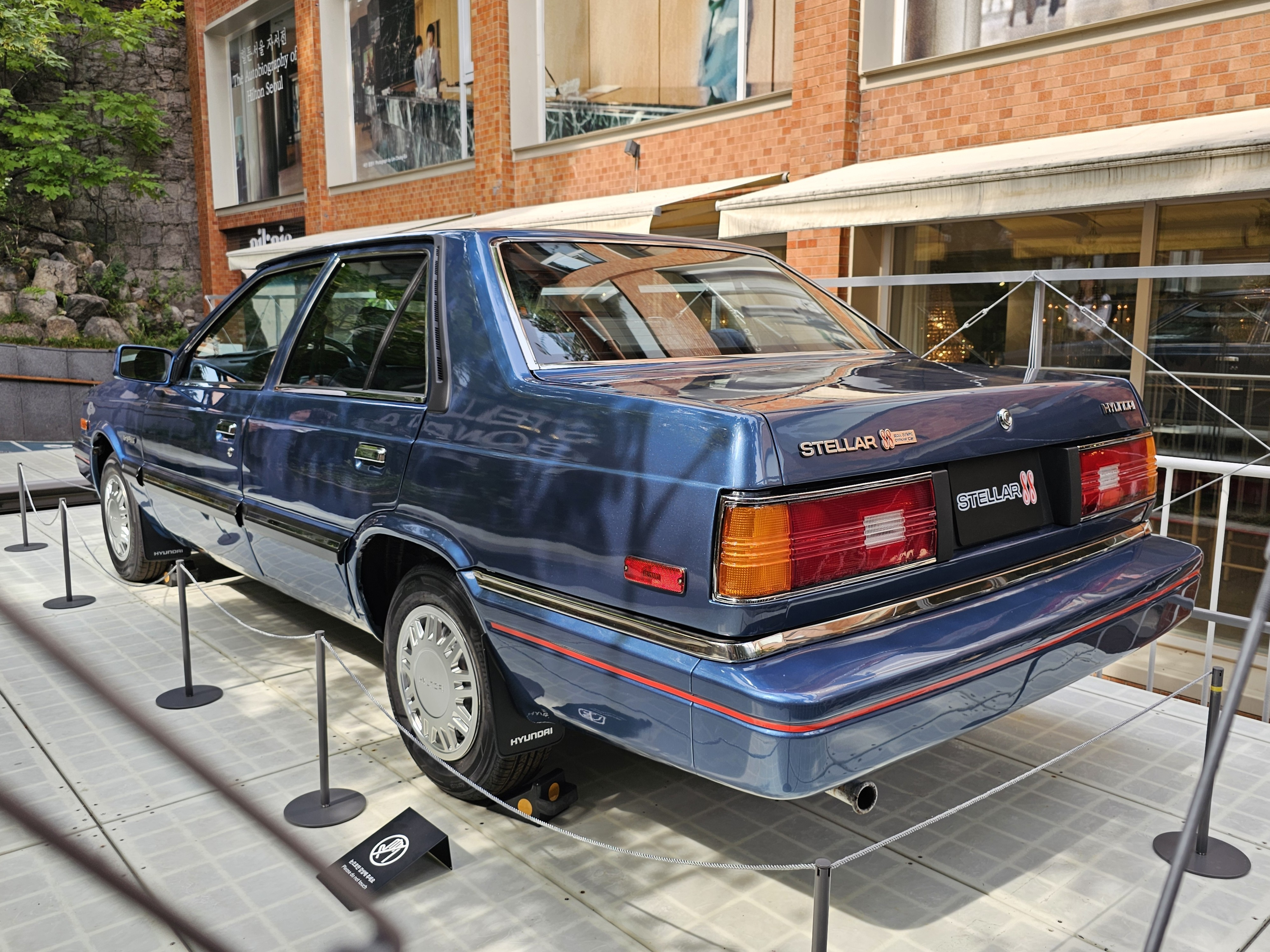
1988 Hyundai Stellar 1.5 88 (South Korea; rear view)

1987 Hyundai Sonata 2000 5 Speed (South Korea)

1987 Hyundai Sonata 2000 5 Speed (South Korea; rear view)

In 1987, the car was refreshed with the name changed to Stellar II (or Stellar 2.0 in Canada) in many markets. Changes included a 2-way catalytic converter, new instrument cluster, larger 2.0 L Mitsubishi 4G63 engine (SOHC with eight valves) with a feedback two-barrel carburettor, higher output alternator, larger headlights, and restyled taillights. The front double wishbone suspension was changed to a MacPherson strut design, along with larger brake callipers, as well as a two-piece driveshaft. The Stellar had the option of riding on several types of aluminium alloy wheels and was equipped with standard Michelin all-season tyres in Canada. Also that year, an automatic transmission (Borg Warner 03-71) with overdrive was available as an option. In the domestic South Korean market, this was the first of their cars to be sold as the Sonata. In Europe, the Stellar II is sometimes referred to as the Stellar Prima. This was only limited to the new 2.0 GSL model, thus differing from the continued 1.6 models. The 2.0 GSL "Prima" received new, larger bumpers, restyled lights, and an updated dashboard, while the 1.6 GSL kept the original design which was also continued for the 1.6 SL and 1.6 L. The 1.4 models were discontinued for the 1987 model year.

=== Export markets ===
The Stellar was not available in the United States due to strict emission standards, but it was available in Canada and other countries. In addition, the Stellar was the only inexpensive four-cylinder powered rear-wheel-drive saloon car after the Toyota Corolla shifted to front-wheel drive in 1984 and the Daihatsu Charmant was discontinued in 1987. The Stellar was replaced in Canada and Europe by the Hyundai New Sonata in 1992. In the Korean domestic market, the lower end of the Stellar lineup for Private use can be considered as having been replaced by the Sonata, while 1.8 and 2.0 LPG Taxi models were produced until January 1997. The Stellar (along with the Pony) would be Hyundai's last rear-wheel drive cars for North America until the 2009 Genesis.

The Stellar was sold in New Zealand with right-hand drive. It was available with the 1.6-liter Mitsubishi engine with the five-speed manual gearbox; an automatic transmission was an optional extra. The original importer was a unit of the Auckland-based Giltrap Motor Group.

== Lineup ==
- Prima (1983–1986)
- TX (1985–1997)
- FX (1983–1986)
- GX (1987–1990)
- GSL (1983–1986)
- SL (1983–1986)
- CXL (Canada and Korea only, 1984–1986)
- Apex (1986–1987)
- 88 (Seoul Olympic limited edition, 1987–1988)
- GXL (1989–1991)
- 1.8 i (1990–1992)

Europe:

- 1.4 L 4-speed manual (1983–1987)
- 1.4 SL 4-speed manual (1983–198?)
- 1.4 GLS 5-speed manual
- 1.6 L 4-speed manual (1983–1987)
- 1.6 L 5-speed manual (1987–1989)
- 1.6 SL 5-speed manual (1983–1989)
- 1.6 SL automatic (1983–1987)
- 1.6 GLS/GSL 5-speed manual (1983–1989)
- 1.6 GSL automatic (1983–1989)
- 2.0 GSL "Prima" 5-speed manual (1987–1989)
- 2.0 GSL "Prima" automatic (1987–1989)

Korea:

1.4L Engine (1983–1987):

- 1.4L SL 4-Speed manual
- 1.4L GSL 4-Speed manual
- 1.4L "Prima" 4-Speed manual
- 1.4L LPG Taxi 4-Speed manual (1983–1985)

1.6L Engine (1983–1986/1987–1990)

- 1.6L GSL 4-Speed manual (1983–1984)
- 1.6L "Prima" 4-Speed manual (1983–1984)
- 1.6L Wagon 4-Speed manual (Police-use only, 1984–1986)
- 1.6L LPG Taxi 4-Speed manual (1983–1987)
- 1.6L LPG Taxi 5-Speed manual (1987–1990)

1.5L Engine (1984–1990)

- 1.5L SL 4-Speed manual (1984–1987)
- 1.5L GL 4-Speed manual (1987–1990)
- 1.5L GX 4-Speed manual (1986–1990)
- 1.5L CXL 3-Speed automatic (1985–1986)
- 1.5L CXL 4-Speed manual (1985–1986)
- 1.5L CXL 5-Speed manual (1985–1986)
- 1.5L 88 4-Speed automatic (1987–1988)
- 1.5L 88 5-Speed manual (1987–1988)
- 1.5L GXL 4-Speed automatic (1989–1990)
- 1.5L GXL 5-Speed manual (1989–1990)
- 1.5L APEX 4-Speed manual (1986–1990)
- 1.5L LPG Taxi 4-Speed manual (1985–1987)

1.8L Engine (1990–1997)

- 1.8i 4-Speed automatic (1990–1992)
- 1.8i 5-Speed manual (1990–1992)
- 1.8 LPG Taxi 5-Speed manual (1990–1997)

2.0L Engine (1987–1997)

- 2.0 LPG TX (Taxi) 5-Speed manual (1987–1997)

== Major specifications ==
- Overall length: 4416 mm (173.9 in) (2.0 GSL: 4578 mm (180.2 in))
- Overall width: 1716 mm (67.6 in)
- Overall height: 1372 mm (54.0 in)
- Wheelbase: 2579 mm (101.5 in)
- Front track: 1445 mm (56.89 in)
- Rear track: 1425 mm (56.10 in)
- Curb weight: 1000 kg (2204 lb.) (2.0 GSL: 1164 kg (2566 lb.))
- Gross weight: 1475 kg (3251 lb.) (2.0 GSL: 1610 kg (3549 lb.))
- Wheel dimensions: 13 x 4.5 in or 13 x 5.5 in
- Steering type: Rack and pinion
- Front brakes: Disc
- Rear brakes: Drum

== See also ==
- Hyundai Elantra
- Hyundai Sonata
- Ford Cortina
