= Mitsubishi MCA =

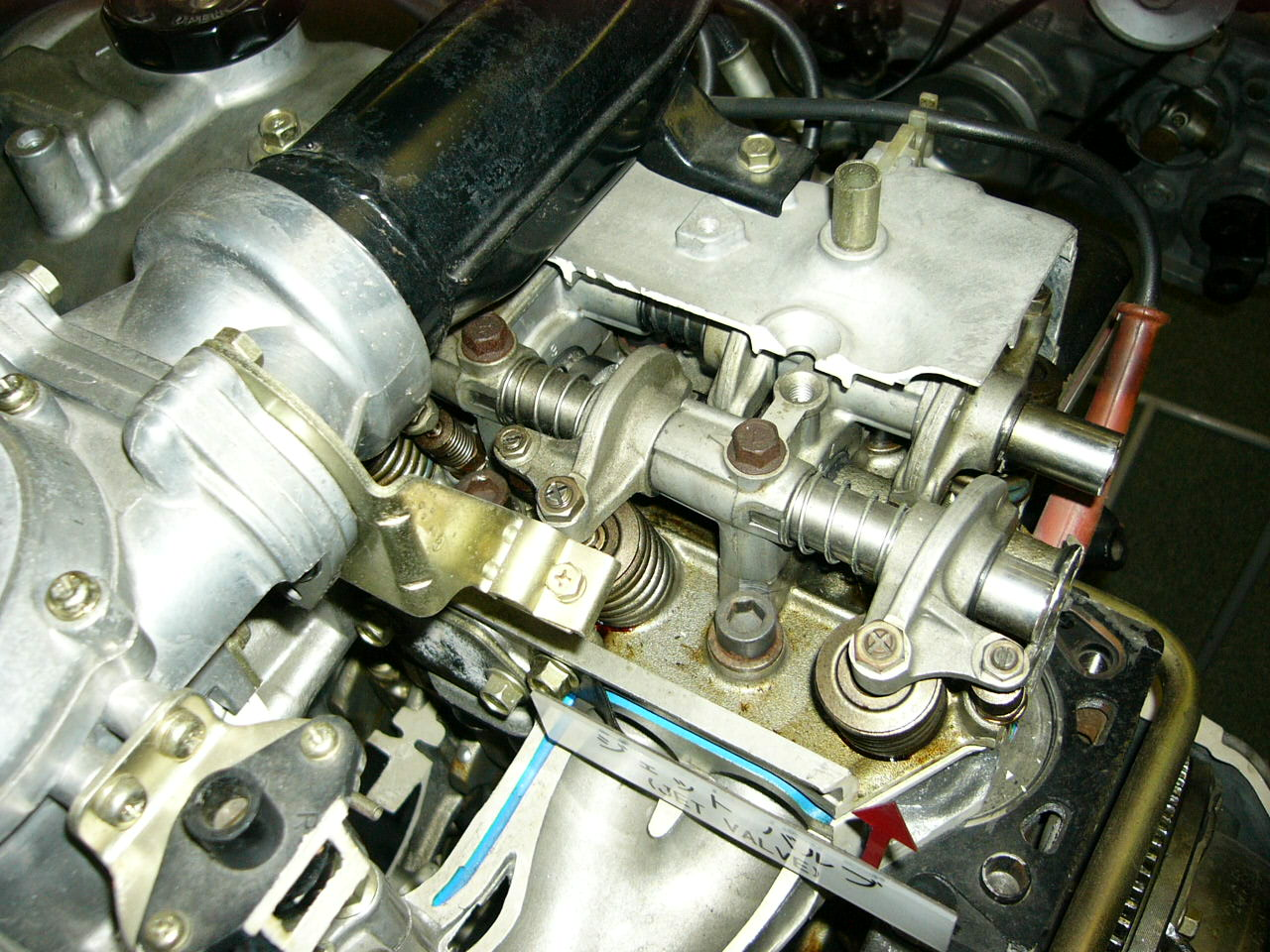
MCA-Jet valve displayed

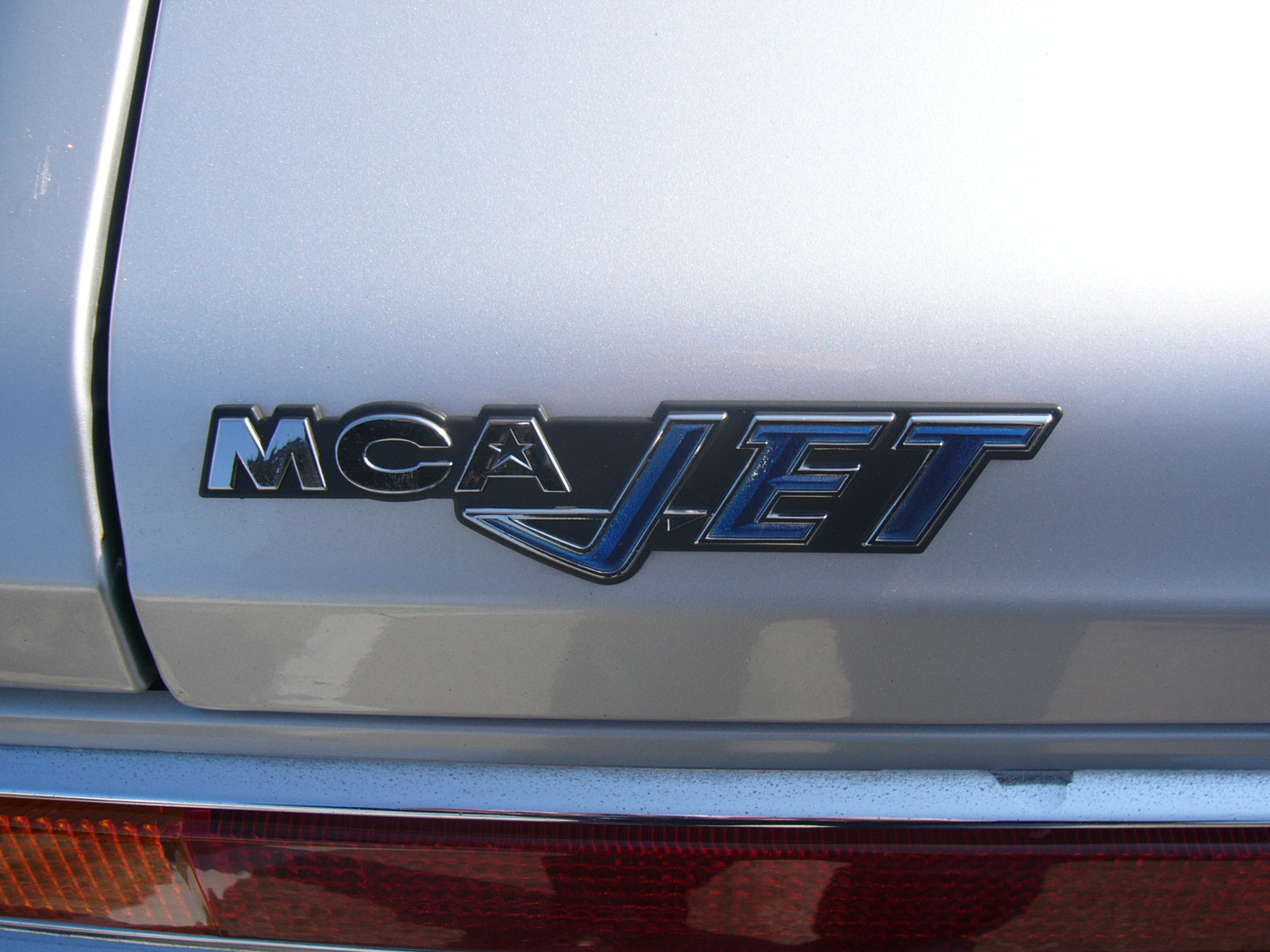
trunk lid emblem of the MCA-JET

Mitsubishi MCA stands for Mitsubishi Clean Air, a moniker used in Japan to identify vehicles built with emission control technology. The term was first introduced in Japan, with later introductions internationally. The technology first appeared in January 1973 on the Mitsubishi 4G32A gasoline-powered inline four cylinder engine installed in all Mitsubishi vehicles using the 4G32 engine, and the Saturn-6 6G34 six-cylinder gasoline-powered engine installed in the Mitsubishi Debonair. The technology was installed so that their vehicles would be in compliance with Japanese Government emission regulations passed in 1968.

Emission reducing technology began with the installation of a positive crankcase ventilation (PCV) valve (MCA-I), followed by the addition of a thermo reactor air pump and catalytic converter in addition to an exhaust gas recirculation (EGR) valve (MCA-II) and a solenoid controlled automatic choke installed on the carburetor.

The MCA-Jet system has a small third valve separate from the intake and exhaust valves. Separate passages in the intake manifold feed each MCA-Jet valve. Since these passages are smaller than the main intake manifold passages, the air/fuel mixture must move faster. When the faster moving air/fuel mixture from the MCA-Jet valve hits the slower moving air/fuel mixture from the intake valve, a strong air swirling effect occurs that promotes more complete combustion. With MCA-Jet it was found that stable combustion could be obtained even with large amounts of exhaust gas recirculation (EGR), NOx could be reduced, and combustion improved. Honda's CVCC Stratified charge engine approach also used a small third valve, but sent a richer air/fuel mixture to a small pre-combustion chamber near the spark plug, to help ignite a leaner air/fuel mixture in the main combustion chamber. MCA-Jet was a simpler system that sent the same air/fuel mixture to all intake and MCA-Jet valves. Each MCA-Jet valve is quite small and may be prone to carbon build-up, causing the MCA-Jet valve(s) to stick open. If a Mitsubishi-designed engine has low compression, the MCA-Jet valve(s) could be the cause. Each MCA-Jet valve and valve seat are a self-contained cylinder-shaped unit that screws into the cylinder head for easy replacement. Aftermarket MCA-Jet valves are available. With the advent of 4-valve-per-cylinder engines, manufacturers typically design the camshaft(s) to open one intake valve slightly before the other to create a swirling effect. This has made the MCA-Jet system obsolete. The MCA-Jet system was used in certain Mitsubishi-designed engines installed in both Mitsubishi-branded and Chrysler/Dodge/Plymouth-branded vehicles during the late 1970s to late 1980s.
