= Mitsubishi Sapporo =

The Mitsubishi Sapporo name has been used on two derivations of the Mitsubishi Galant:

- 1978–1984 — This rear-wheel drive hardtop coupé was based on the third generation Galant. In Japan it was sold as the "Mitsubishi Galant Lambda", while European and South American export markets received it with the "Sapporo" label. In the US it was sold as Dodge Challenger and Plymouth Sapporo. It received a thorough facelift in 1980.
- 1987–1990 — In the European market, the hardtop sedan version of the front-wheel drive fifth generation Galant was sold as the Sapporo.
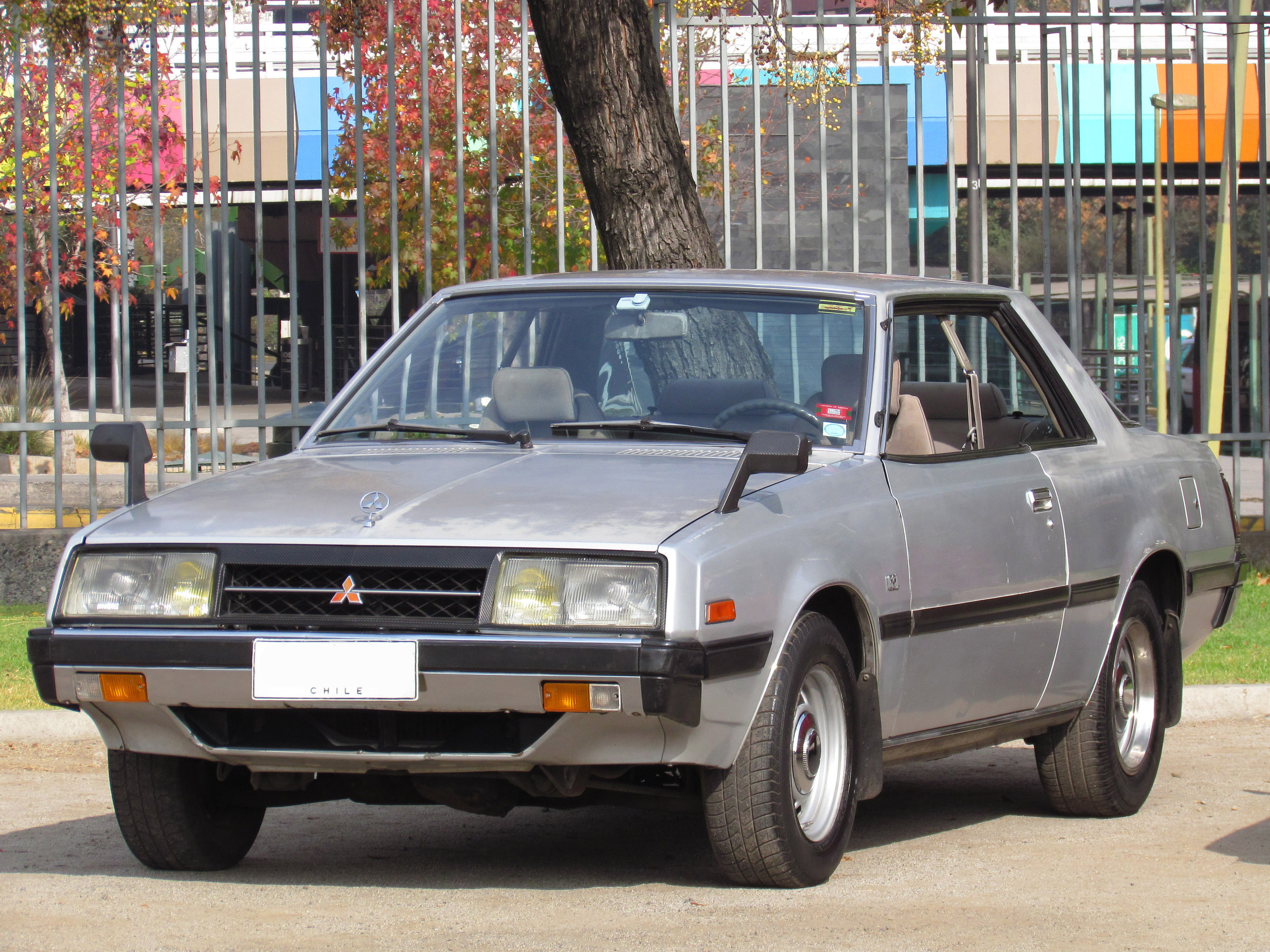
Coupe (1978–1984)

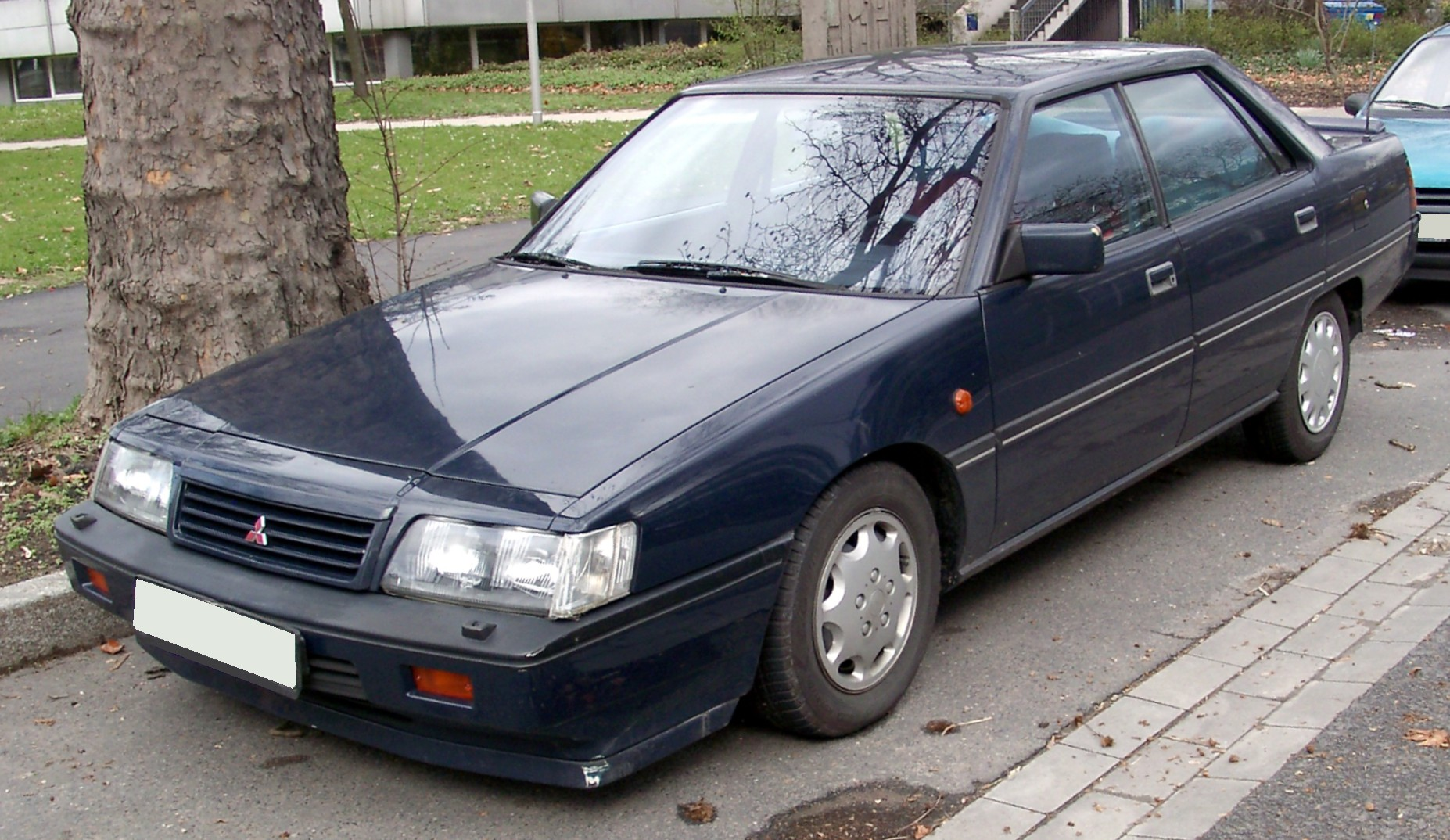
Sedan (Europe, 1987–1990)
