= Sub transmission =

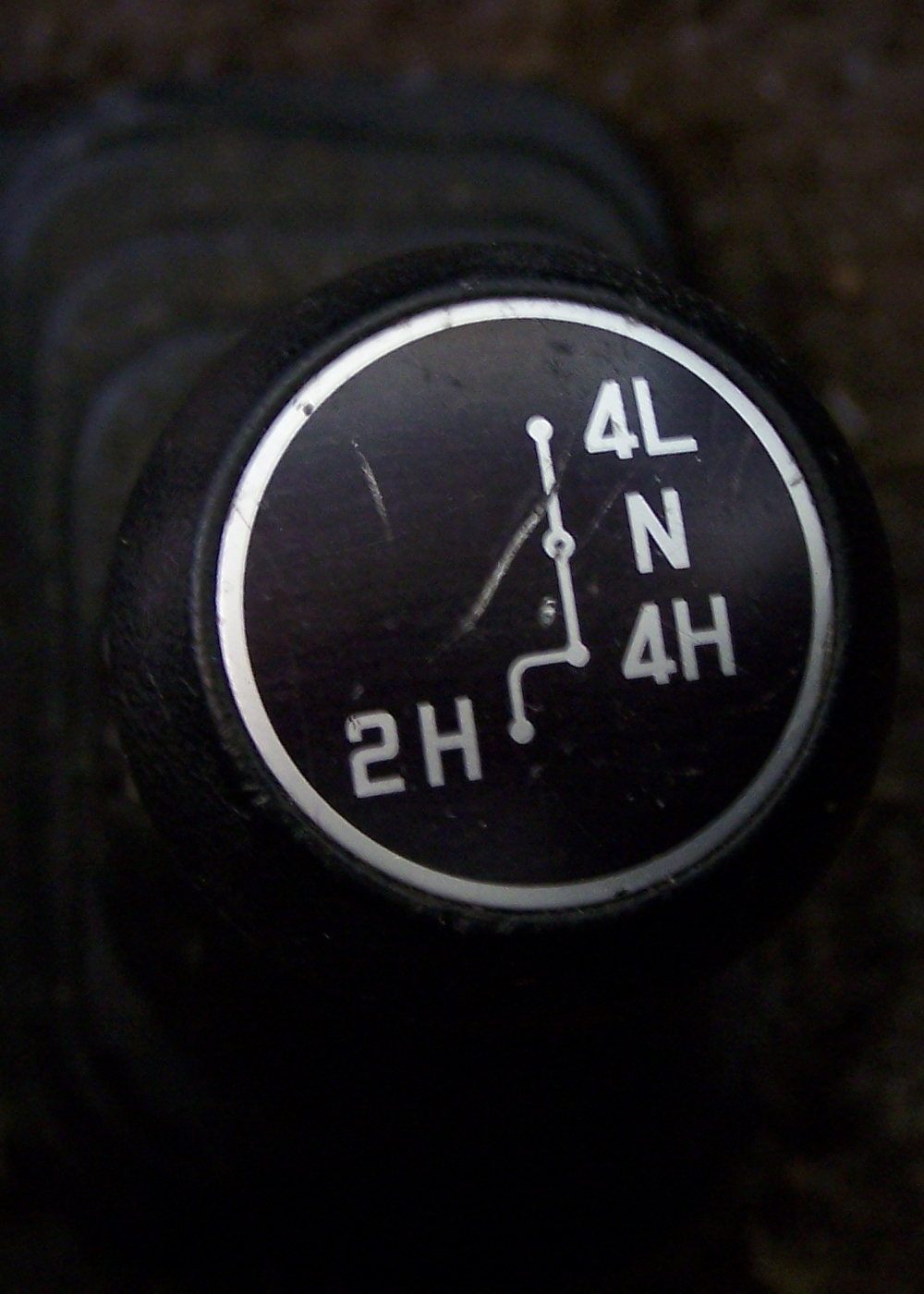
Transfer shifter equipped with sub transmission of 4WD

A sub transmission for automotive transmission mechanics is an extra manual or automatic transmission that is independent of the main transmission. In a four-wheel drive vehicle, an extra gear stick is often provided to transfer torque when needed and to put the vehicle into low range. Sub transmissions are used in a few motorcycles, such as the Honda CB900C and the Honda CT110. In the Mitsubishi Cordia, a Super Shift 4x2 sub transmission was adopted, doubling the number of 4-speed main transmission gears.
