= Dodge Colt =

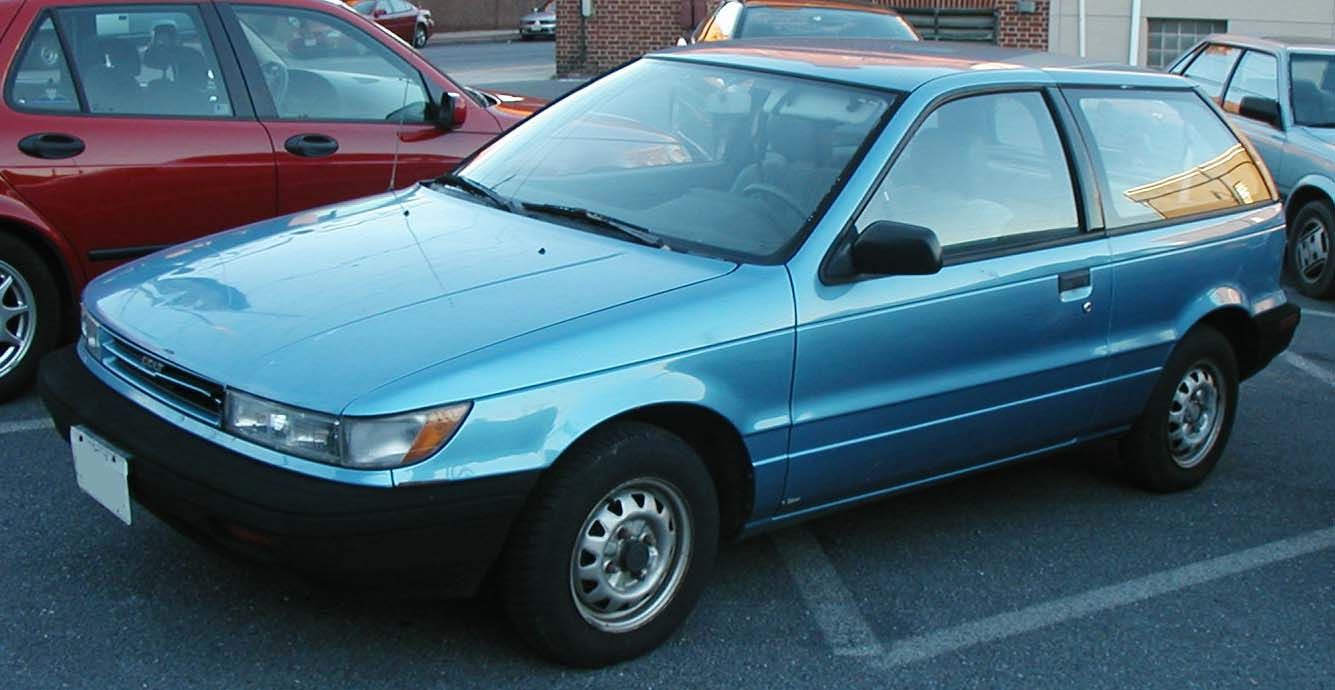
- 1989-1992 Dodge Colt

Overview
- Manufacturer: Mitsubishi Motors
- Also called: Plymouth Champ; Plymouth Colt; Eagle Summit; Plymouth Cricket
- Model years: 1971–1994 (US); 1971–1995 (Canada)
- Assembly: Japan: Kurashiki, Okayama; Thailand: Laem Chabang (MMTh)

Body and chassis
- Class: Compact (1971–1981); Subcompact (1979–1995)

Chronology
- Successor: Dodge/Plymouth Neon; Eagle Summit (For sedan, U.S. only)

The Dodge Colt is a subcompact car manufactured by Mitsubishi Motors and marketed by Dodge for model years 1971 to 1994 as a captive import. Rebadged variants included the Plymouth Champ and Plymouth Colt, both were marketed by Plymouth.

The Colt was initially a rebadged variant of the rear-wheel drive Galant and Lancer families before shifting to the smaller front-wheel drive Mitsubishi Mirage subcompacts in 1979.

== First generation (1971–1973) ==
First generation
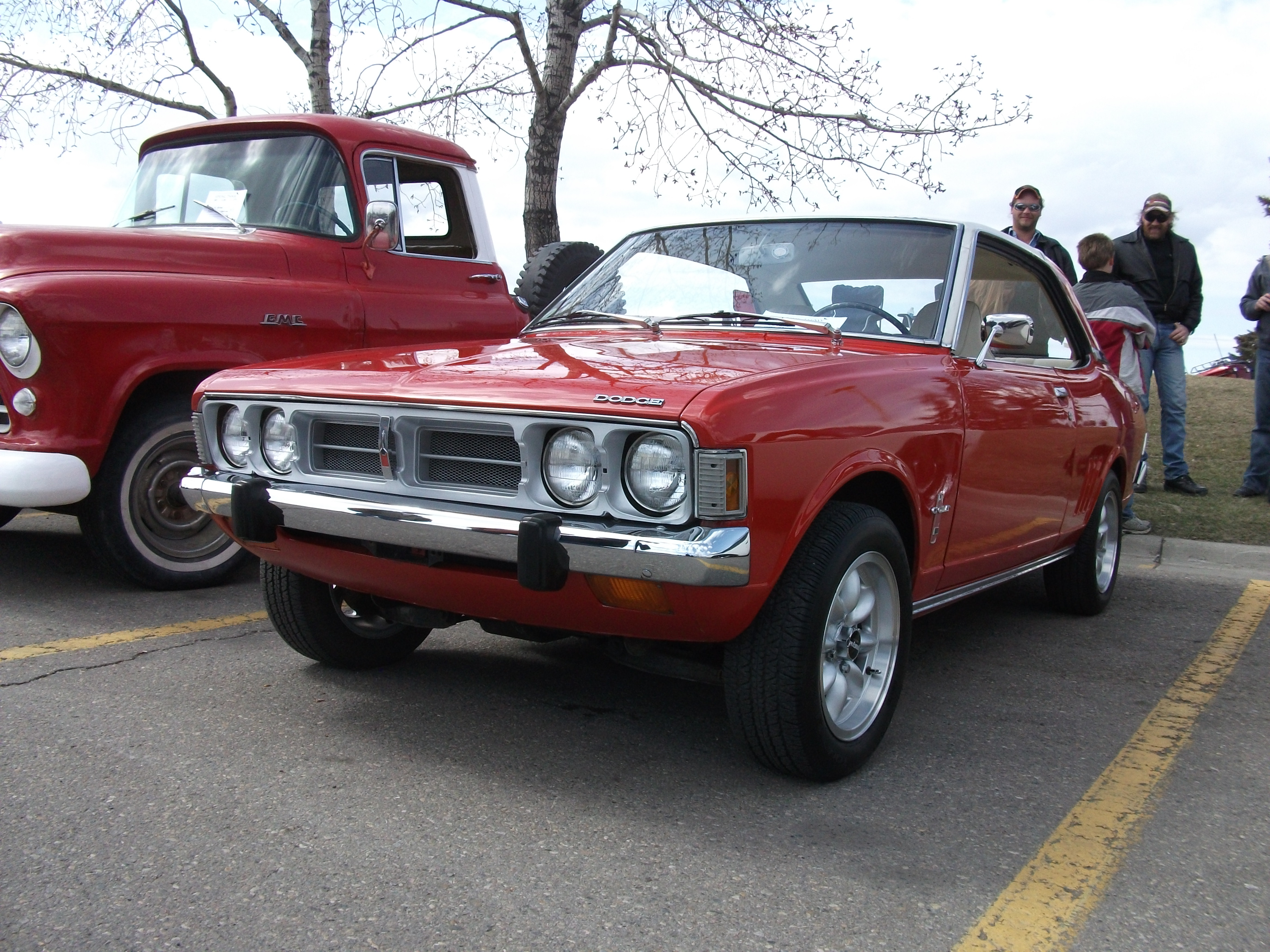
- 1973 Dodge Colt HT Coupe

Overview
- Also called: Mitsubishi Colt Galant; Mitsubishi Galant; Plymouth Cricket (CDN)
- Production: 1971–1973

Body and chassis
- Body style: 2-door coupe 2-door hardtop (pillarless coupe); 4-door sedan 5-door station wagon
- Layout: FR layout

Powertrain
- Engine: 1.6 L 4G32 I4

Dimensions
- Wheelbase: 2,420 mm (95.3 in)

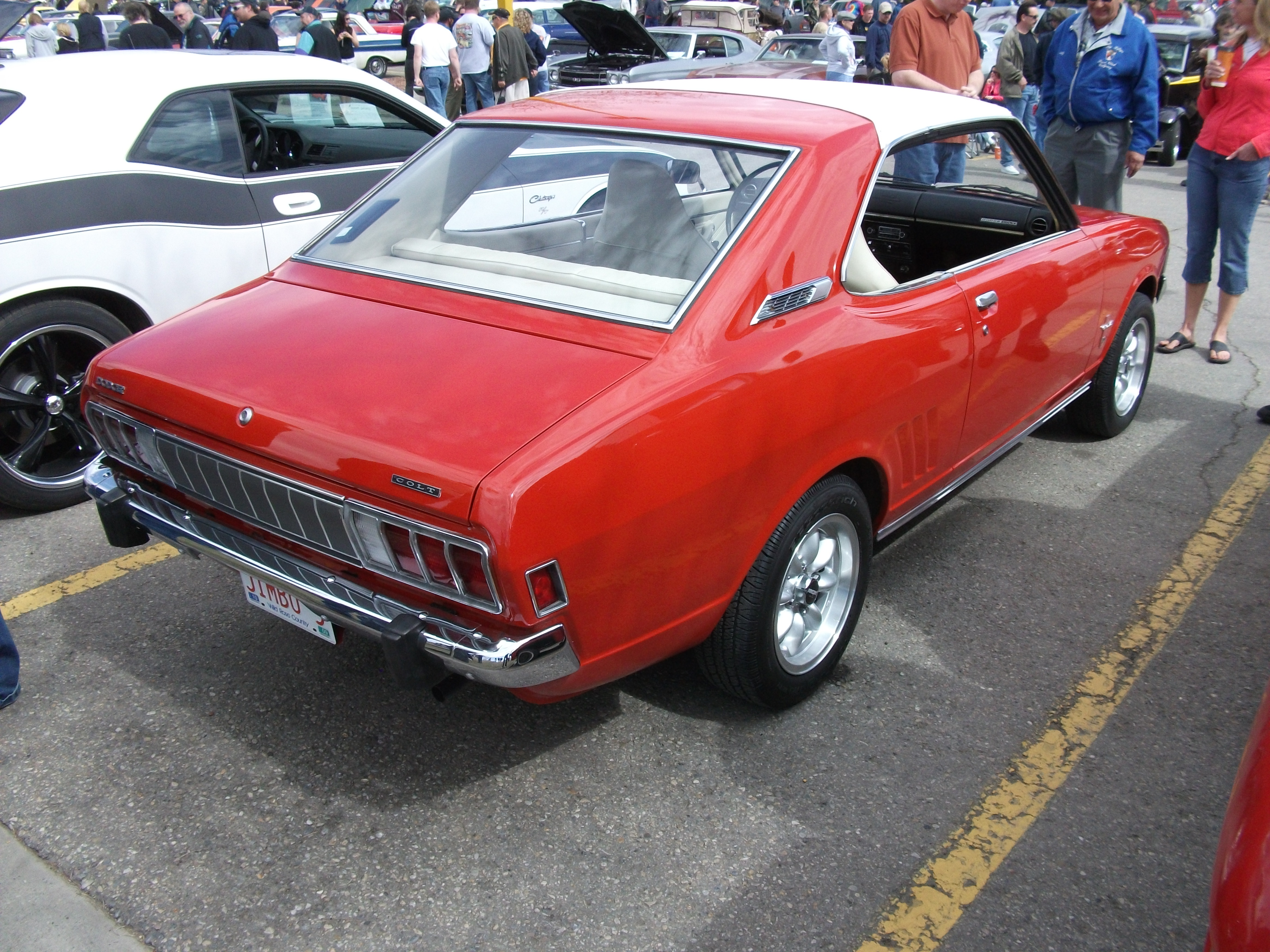
1973 Dodge Colt HT Coupe rear view

Introduced in 1970 as a 1971 model, the first generation Dodge Colt was a federalized first-generation Mitsubishi Colt Galant. Available as a 2-door pillared coupe, 2-door hardtop coupe, 4-door sedan, and 5-door wagon, the Colt had a 1,597 cc (97.5 cu in) 4-cylinder engine. The unibody layout was traditional, front engine and rear-wheel drive with MacPherson struts in front and a live rear axle. Standard transmission was a 4-speed manual, with a 3-speed automatic being an option. The engine was initially rated for 100 hp (75 kW), but dropped to 83 hp (62 kW) in 1972 when manufacturers revised the method of measuring horsepower from gross to SAE net. For 1973, a GT hardtop coupe model was added featuring rally stripes, sport wheels, and a center console amongst other features. The Dodge Colt was Chrysler's response to the AMC Gremlin, Ford Pinto, and Chevrolet Vega. As a captive import from Mitsubishi, the Colt also competed directly with other Japanese imports, such as the Toyota Corolla, Honda Civic and Datsun 1200.

== Second generation (1974–1977) ==
Second generation
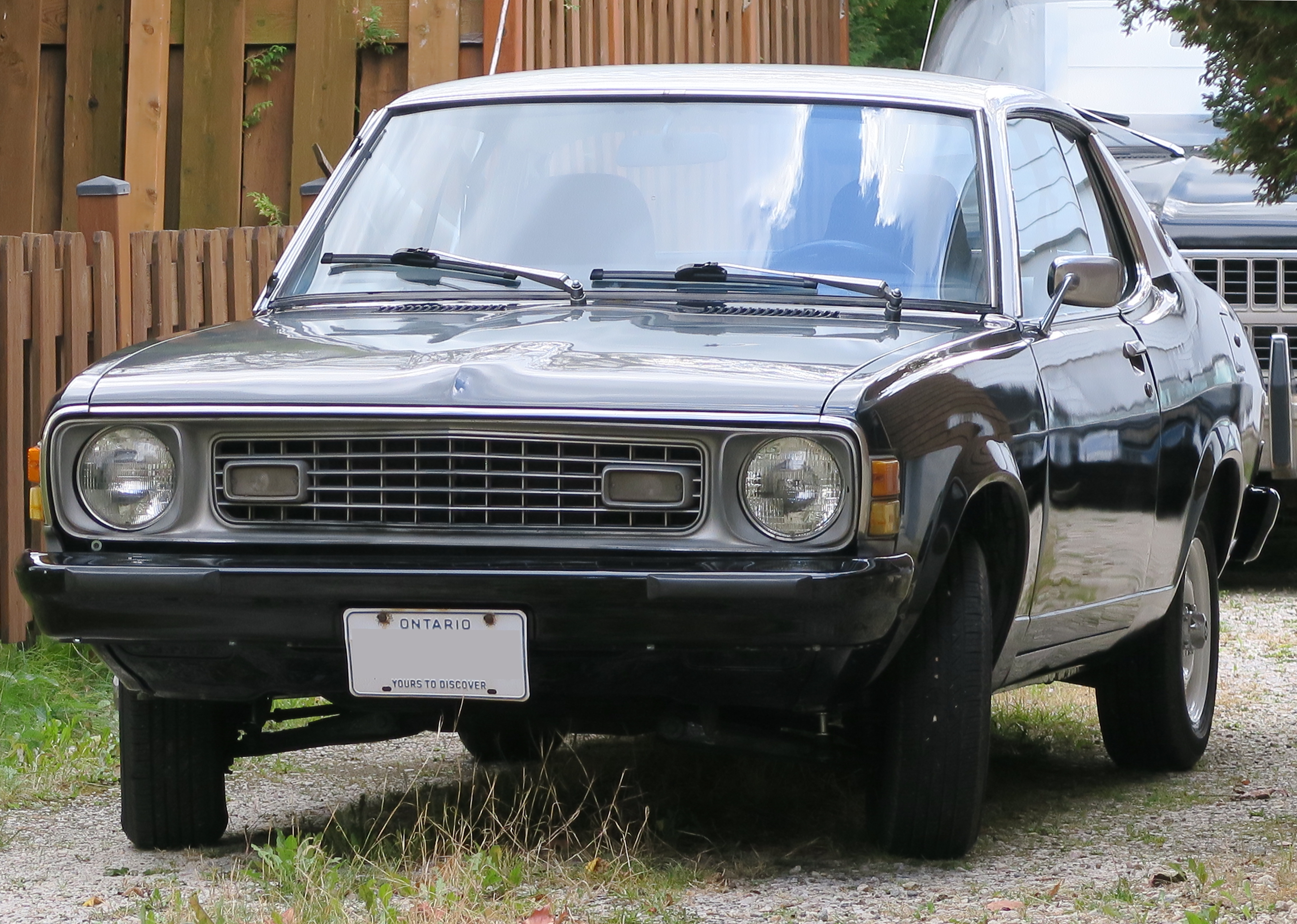
- 1976 Dodge Colt Carousel 2-Door Hardtop

Overview
- Also called: Mitsubishi Galant; Chrysler Galant/Valiant Galant (AUS); Plymouth Colt (CDN); Plymouth Cricket (CDN)
- Production: 1974–1977

Body and chassis
- Body style: 2-door hardtop (pillarless coupe); 2/4-door sedan; 5-door station wagon
- Layout: FR layout

Powertrain
- Engine: 1.6 L 4G32 I4; 2.0 L G52B I4

Dimensions
- Wheelbase: 2,420 mm (95.3 in)

Based on the platform of the first generation model, the Galant sedans and coupes received a new, somewhat rounder body in 1973, while wagons continued with the old body with a facelifted front end. The new version, with single headlights rather than the doubles of the previous generation, became the 1974 Dodge Colt in the US, available in the same bodystyles as the first one. The base engine also remained the same, but a larger G52B "Astron" engine became optionally available, originally only in combination with the automatic transmission. Later, the 2-liter engine became available with a manual transmission as well and was made standard fitment in the GT coupe. The 2-liter engine developed 96 hp (72 kW) at 5500 rpm, with the California version making two fewer horsepower. Ratings varied from 79–83 hp (59–62 kW) for the smaller one and 89–96 hp (66–72 kW) for the larger engine in different publications and across the years.

A four-speed manual or three-speed automatic remained available, although the original Borg-Warner automatic transmission was replaced by Chrysler's own Torqueflite unit in the 2-liter version. The Torqueflite later supplanted the old Borg-Warner unit entirely. For 1977 a five-speed manual became available (standard in the GT and Carousel coupes). The Carousel, introduced in 1975 along with larger bumpers, was more luxurious and carried special blue and white paint. For 1977, the "Silent Shaft" version of the smaller engine became available and was fitted as standard equipment in GT and Carousels. The introduction of the new Dodge Colt "Mileage Maker" meant there was a mix of second and third generation models in 1977. The second-generation 2-door hardtops and wagons continued to be offered alongside the new 2- and 4-door "Mileage Makers". The wagon was also available with an "Estate" package that included woodgrain applique on the body sides and adjustable reclining front seats.

This model was also sold as the Dodge Colt 1600 GS in South Africa, only as a two-door hardtop coupé.

In Canada, the second-generation Dodge Colt was rebadged as the Plymouth Cricket for the 1974 and 1975 model years — not to be confused with the rebadged Hillman Avenger, marketed in the United States for model years 1971-1973 without success. All Canadian Crickets for model years 1974-1975 wore the grille from the 1974-1977 Dodge Colt station wagons. All Colt body styles were shared with the Cricket, with the Cricket equivalent of the Colt GT marketed as the Cricket Formula S. These second-generation, Canada-only Crickets were rebadged as Plymouth Colts for 1976.

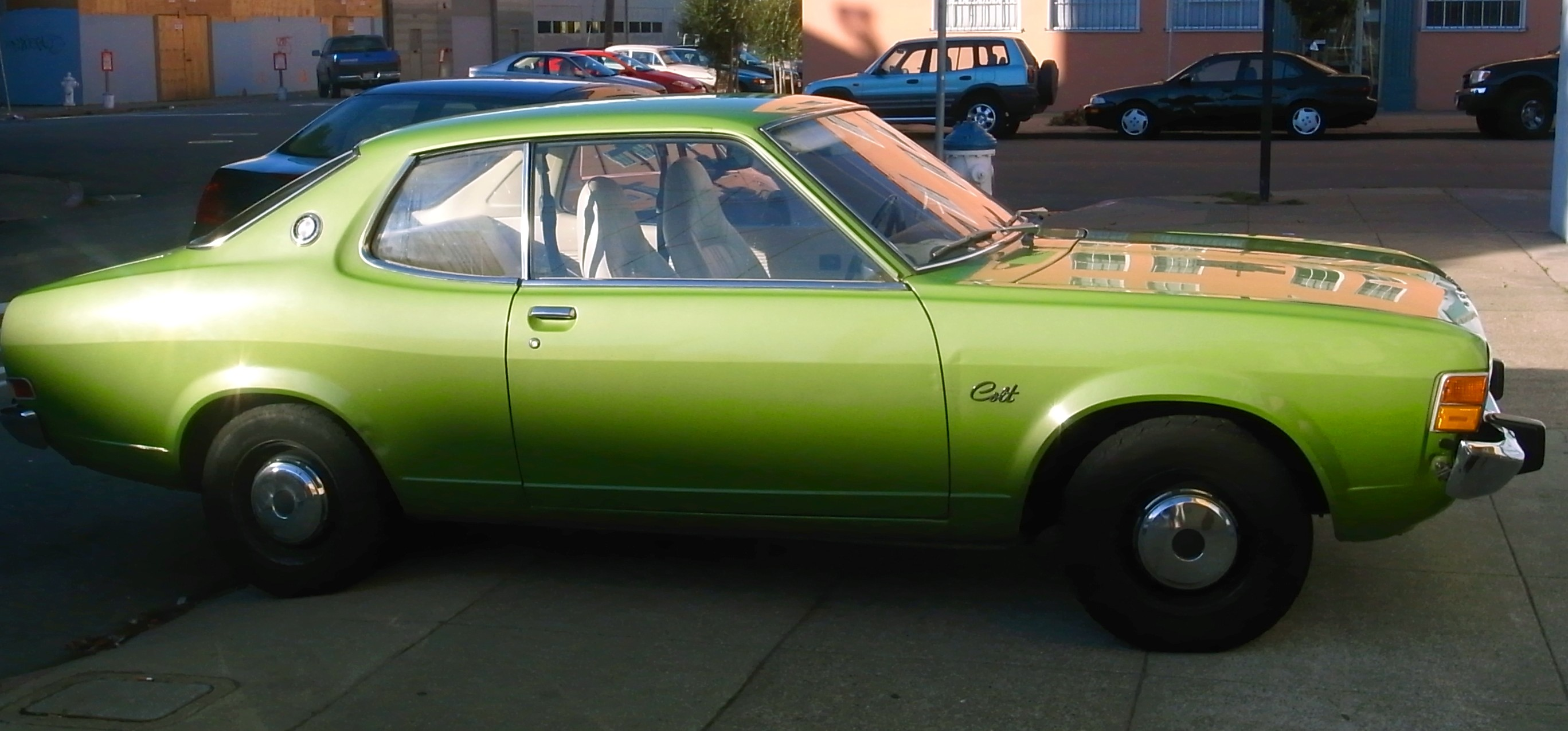
Dodge Colt Coupe; side profile

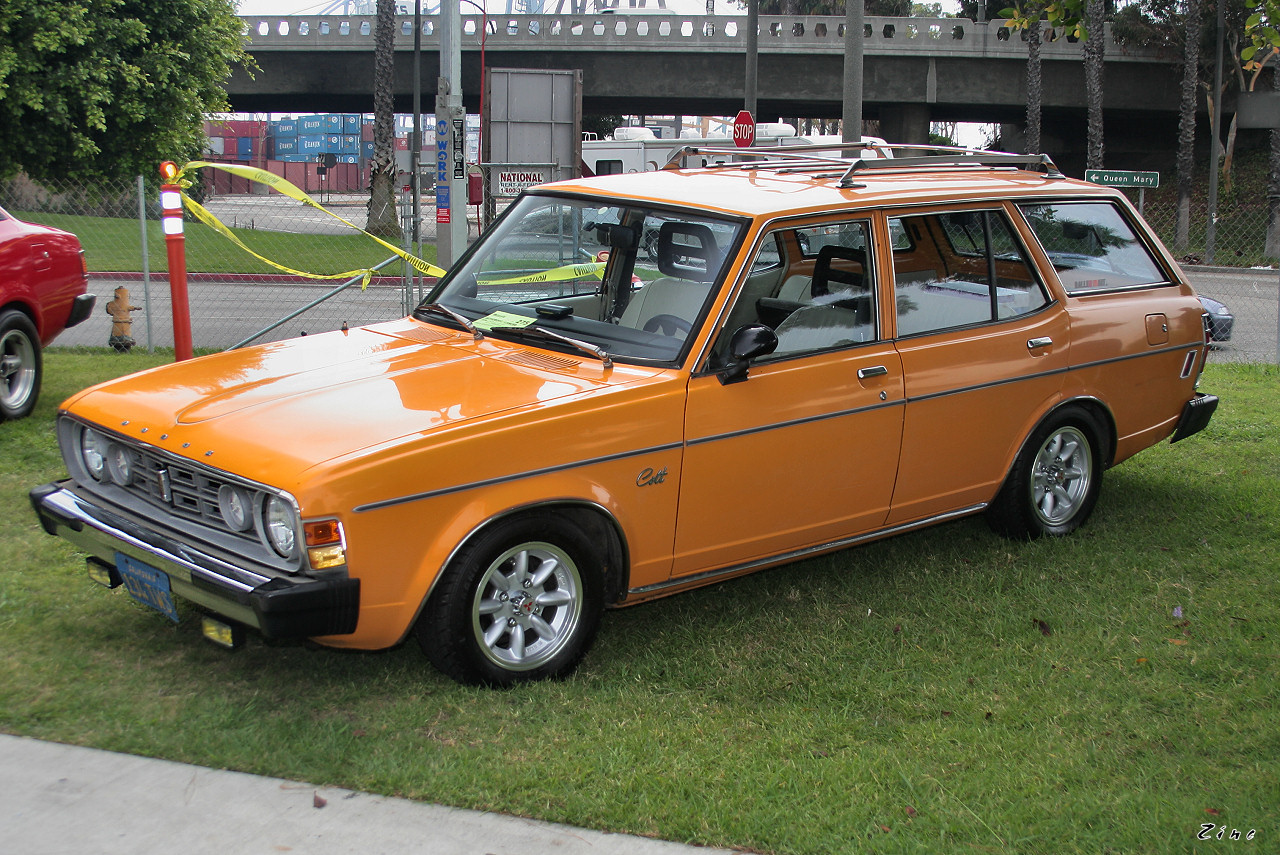
Lightly modified Dodge Colt wagon, with the larger, post-1975 bumpers

== Third generation (1977–1979) ==
1978 Plymouth Colt (Canada)

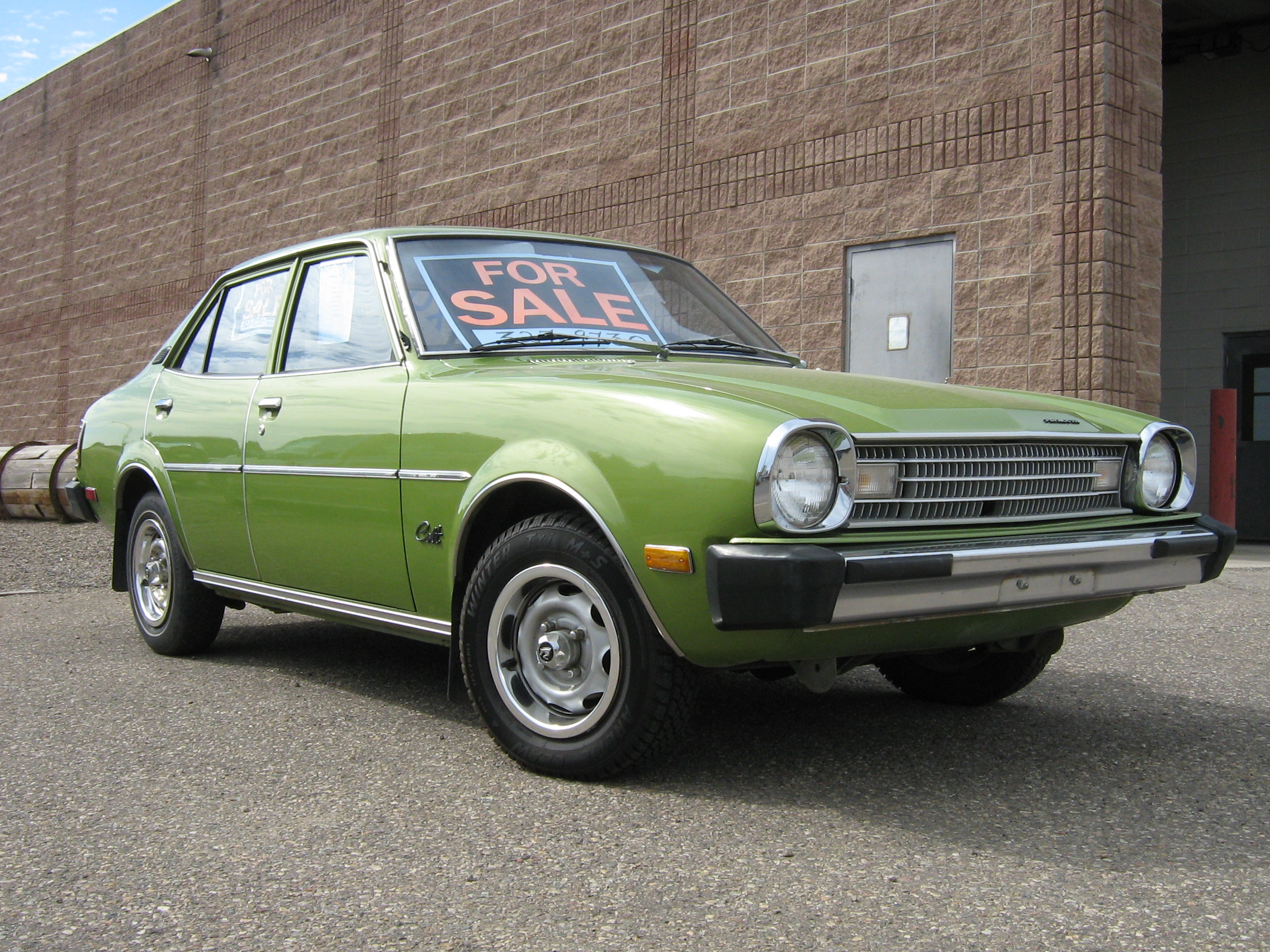
Front view

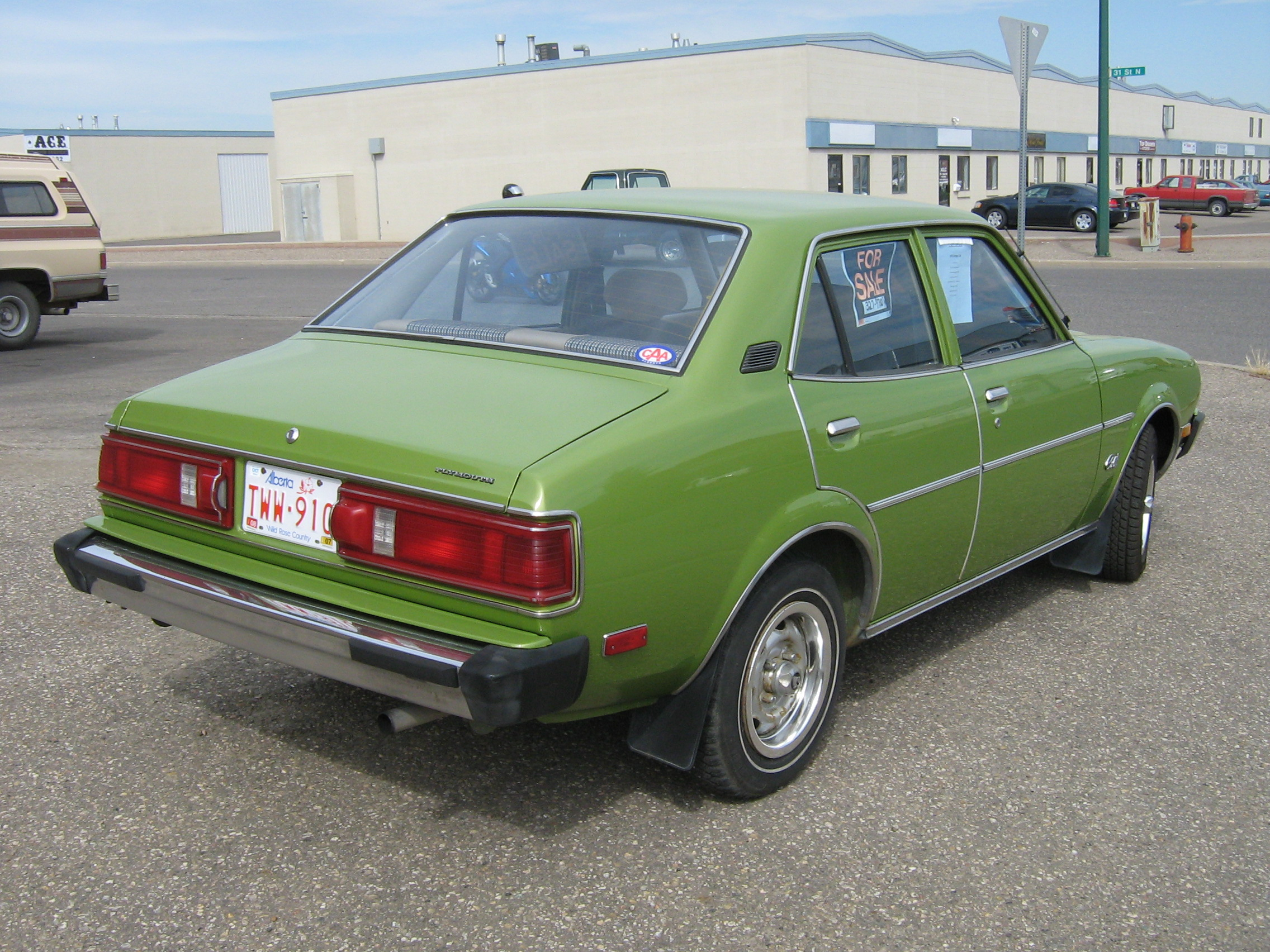
Rear view

Third generation "Mileage Maker"
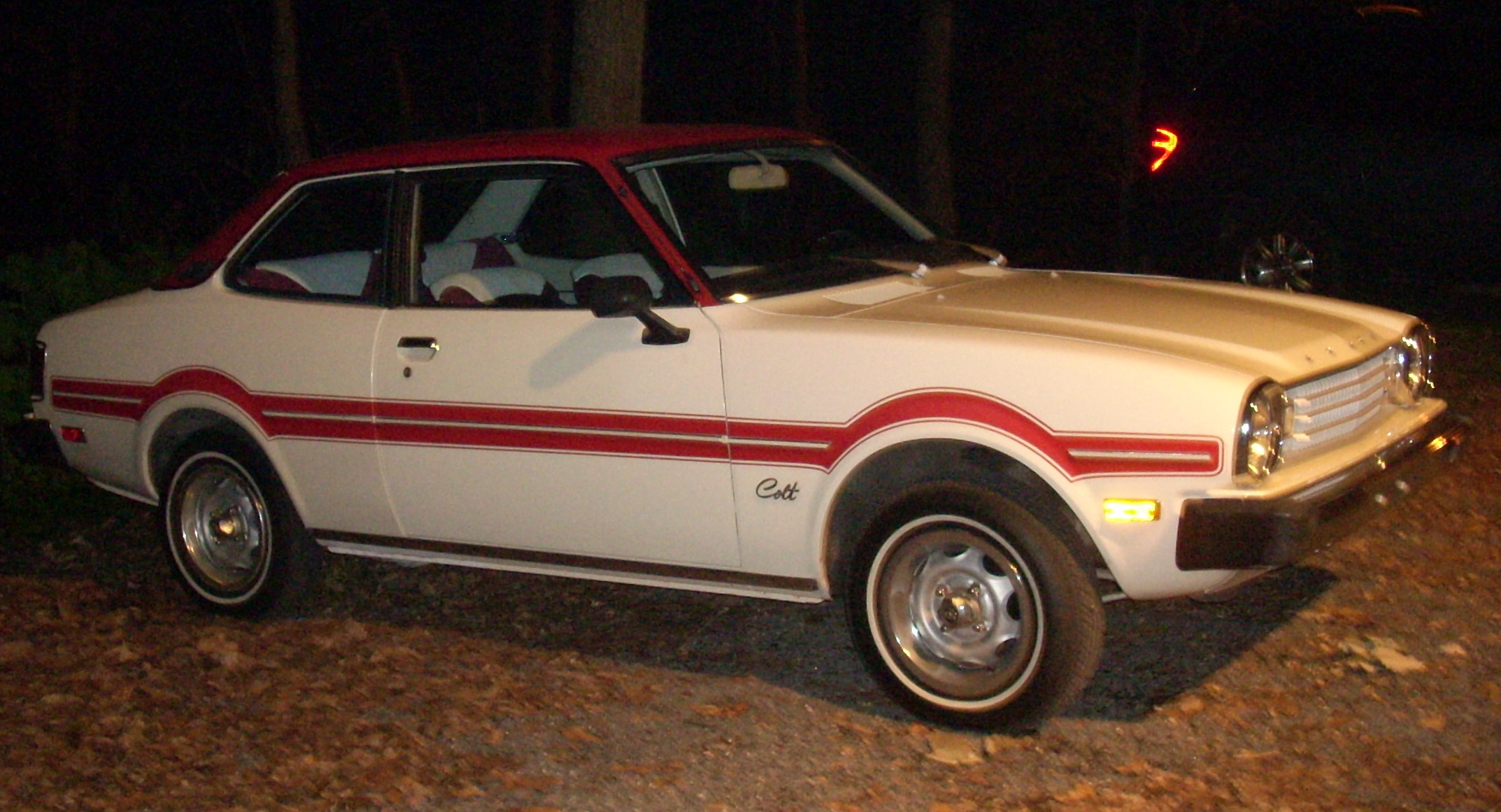
- 1977-1978 Dodge Colt

Overview
- Also called: Mitsubishi Lancer; Plymouth Colt
- Production: 1977–1979

Body and chassis
- Body style: 2-door coupe 4-door sedan
- Layout: FR layout

Powertrain
- Engine: 1.6 L 4G32 I4

Dimensions
- Wheelbase: 2,340 mm (92.1 in)

The third-generation Dodge Colt effectively comprised two lines: coupes and sedans were of a smaller, Lancer-based series, and the station wagons were based on the new Mitsubishi Galant Sigma. In late 1976, for the 1977 model year, the smaller A70-series Mitsubishi Lancer became the Dodge Colt available in two-door coupe and four-door sedan body designs. While the wheelbase was slightly shorter than that of the second generation Colt, overall length was down from 171.1 to 162.6 in (4,346 to 4,130 mm). The new Colt was also referred to as the Dodge Colt "Mileage Maker" to differentiate it from its larger predecessor. Second generation coupe and wagon versions remained on sale for the 1977 model year.

The engine was the 4G32 iteration of Mitsubishi's Saturn engine family 1597 cc rated at 83 hp (62 kW) at 5,500 rpm. A "Silent Shaft" (balance shaft) version of this engine along with a five-speed manual transmission (instead of the standard four-speed) were part of a "Freeway Cruise" package, which also included a maroon/white paintjob. For 1978 power dropped to 77 hp (57 kW) with the introduction of the "MCA-Jet" high-swirl system. The second generation Colt sedans and coupes were replaced by the third generation for the 1980 model year.

=== Colt Wagon (1978) ===
Third generation wagon

Overview
- Also called: Mitsubishi Galant Sigma; Chrysler Sigma; Mitsubishi Sigma, Colt Sigma
- Production: 1978–1981

Body and chassis
- Body style: 5-door station wagon
- Layout: FR layout
- Related: Mitsubishi Galant Lambda; Dodge Challenger

Powertrain
- Engine: 1.6 L 4G32 I4; 2.6 L 4G54 I4

Dimensions
- Wheelbase: 2,515 mm (99.0 in)

For 1978 a new Dodge Colt Wagon appeared - unlike the sedans and coupes, this was not Lancer-based but was instead a rebadged version of the larger Mitsubishi Galant Sigma. The 1.6-litre MCA-Jet four, as per the smaller sedans and coupes, was standard, with the 2.6-litre, 105 hp (78 kW) Astron engine optional along with a five-speed manual transmission. While the last year for the Lancer-based Colts was 1979, the wagon was continued alongside the front-wheel drive Mirage-based fourth generation models until 1981 when it was effectively replaced by the domestic Dodge Aries K wagon. The larger Mitsubishi Galant Lambda coupé was also marketed as the Dodge Colt Challenger from 1978, although the "Colt" part was later dropped. It shared the chassis as well as the engine options of the Colt wagon.

== Fourth generation (1979–1984) ==
Fourth generation
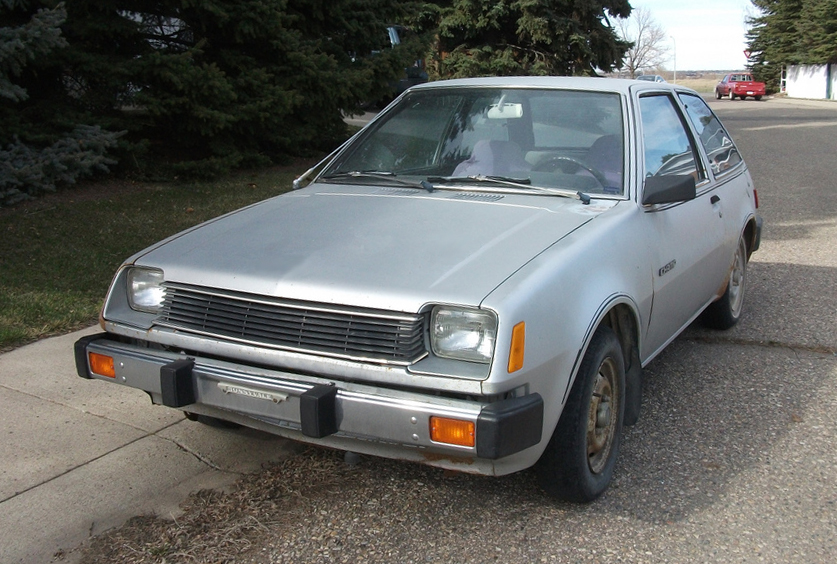
- 1979-1982 Plymouth Colt

Overview
- Also called: Mitsubishi Mirage/Colt; Mitsubishi Lancer Fiore; Plymouth Colt; Plymouth Champ
- Production: 1979–1984

Body and chassis
- Body style: 3-door hatchback 5-door hatchback
- Layout: FF layout

Powertrain
- Engine: 1.4 L 4G12 I4; 1.6 L 4G32 I4; 1.6 L 4G32T turbo I4

In late 1978 for the 1979 model year, the Dodge Colt and Plymouth Champ were marketed as North American captive imports, as rebadged variants of the front-wheel-drive Mitsubishi Mirage. The Colt and Champ (Plymouth Colt after 1982) as a 3-door hatchback in Deluxe or Custom equipment levels. These imports used a 70 horsepower (52 kW) Mitsubishi Orion 4G12 1.4-liter overhead-cam, four-cylinder engine at first, which received the highest United States Environmental Protection Agency fuel economy rating in its debut year. This engine was joined by the 1.6-liter, 80 hp (60 kW) 4G32 Saturn engine at the end of the year. For 1981, a decontented version was introduced. An RS package also became available, with stiffer suspension, sportier interior with extra gauges, and a larger fuel tank.

Colt US Sales
Year	3-door	5-door
1979	60,521	—
1980	83,711	—
1981	84,144	—
1982	52,355	22,675
1983	46,479	27,192
1984	44,724	19,657

There were three manual transmissions and one automatic transmission available. There was a KM110 four-speed manual transmission or a "Twin Stick" (Mitsubishi Super Shift) version of the transmission that used a two-speed transfer case to give 8 forward and 2 reverse speeds. There was also the option of a KM119 five-speed manual transmission or a TorqueFlite three-speed automatic transmission.

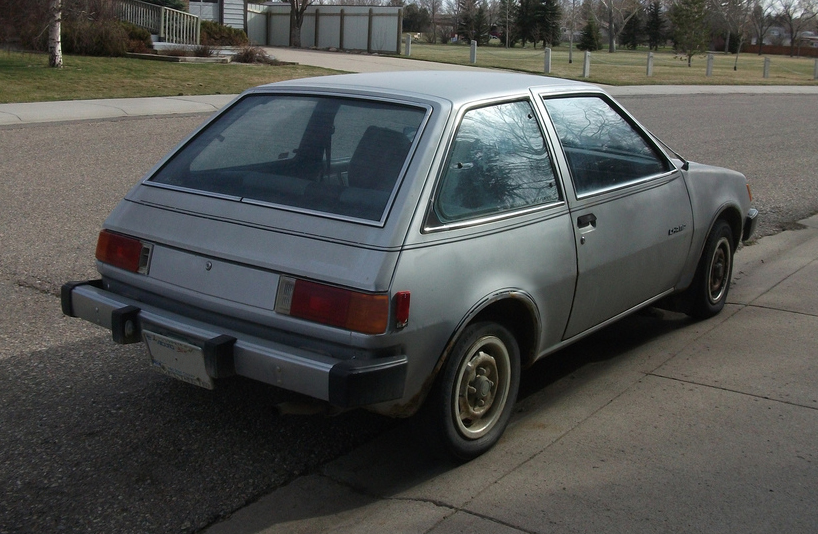
Rear view of the Plymouth Champ, showing the large federal bumpers

For 1982, a five-door hatchback joined the lineup. The names of the equipment levels changed to "E" and "DL". At some point claimed power dropped to 64 and 72 hp respectively for the small and large engines, while the 1.6 was only available with the automatic transmission. In August 1983, for the 1984 model year (which was to be the last year of this model of Colt), the GTS Turbo model arrived along with a naturally aspirated GTS package, similar to the earlier RS one. Unique for North America - the turbocharged Colt/Mirages sold elsewhere had a 1.4-litre engine - this used the fuel-injected 1.6-litre 4G32T engine also seen in the next-generation Colt, providing 102 hp (76 kW) at 5500 rpm and considerable performance. It, too, featured the eight speed Twin Stick transmission and also received ventilated brakes in front. Both GTS models, available with three-door bodywork only, received a larger 13.2 US gal (50 L) gas tank rather than the E and DL's 10.6 US gal (40 L) tank. They also featured a sporty appearance with uprated suspension, blacked out trim details, and a sizable front air dam.

== Fifth generation (1985–1988) ==
Fifth generation
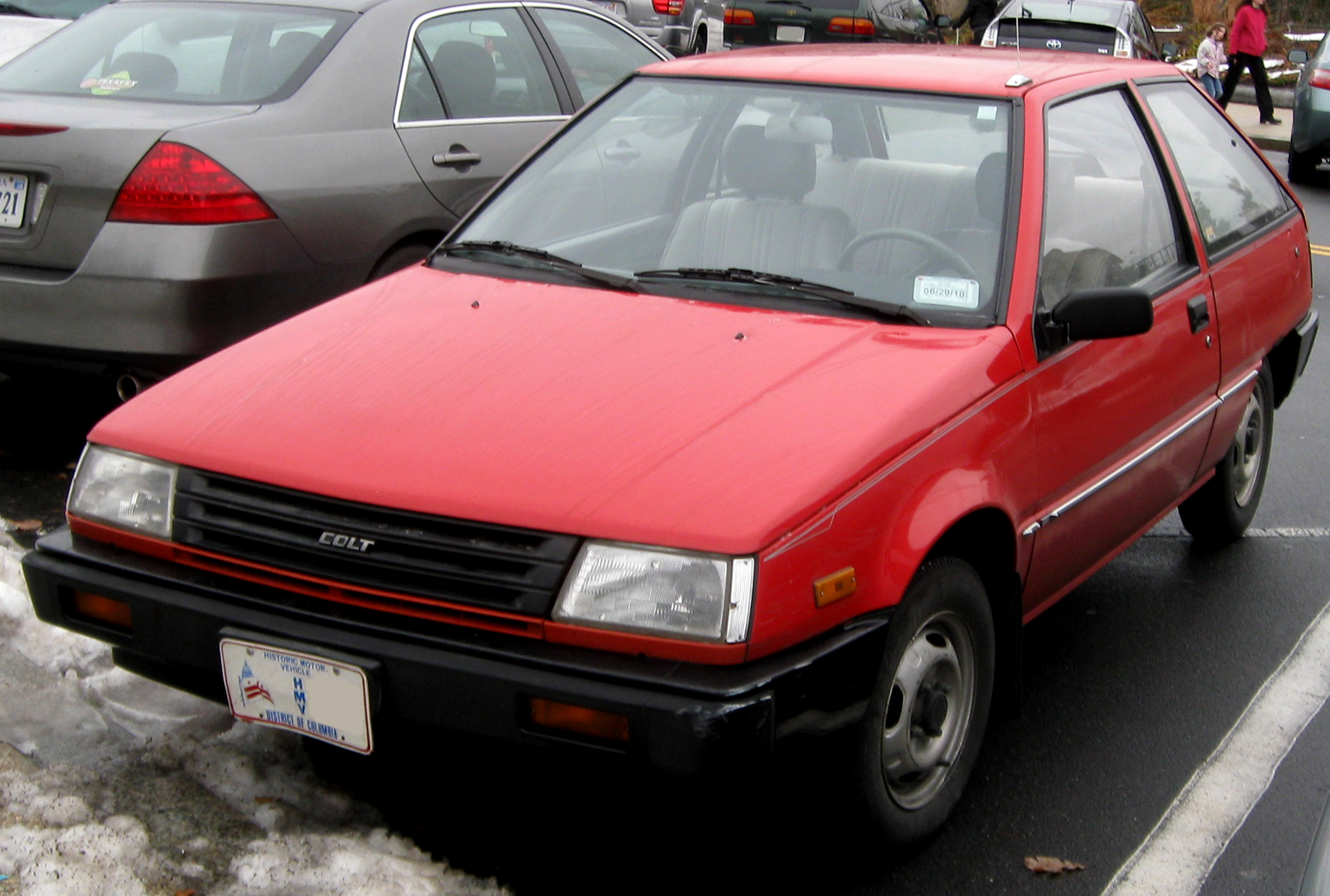
- 1987–1989 Dodge Colt three-door

Overview
- Also called: Dodge/Plymouth Colt 100 (Canada); Mitsubishi Colt; Mitsubishi Mirage; Mitsubishi Lancer; Eagle Vista (Canada); Plymouth Colt
- Production: 1984–1991
- Model years: 1985–1988 (USA); 1985–1991 (Canada)

Body and chassis
- Body style: 3/5-door hatchback; 4-door sedan; 5-door station wagon
- Layout: Front engine, front-wheel drive / four-wheel drive

Powertrain
- Engine: 1.5 L G15B I4; 1.6 L 4G61 DOHC I4 (Wagon); 1.6 L 4G32 turbo I4; 1.8 L 4G37 I4 (4x4 Wagon)
- Transmission: 3-speed automatic 4/5-speed manual

Dimensions
- Wheelbase: 93.7 in (2,380 mm)
- Length: Hatch: 157.3 in (3,995 mm); Sedan: 157.3 in (3,995 mm)
- Width: 63.8 in (1,621 mm)
- Height: 50.8 in (1,290 mm)

Beginning in September 1984, the fifth generation Dodge/Plymouth Colt was marketed for model year 1985, as a three-door hatchback, a four-door sedan, and as a five-door minivan/station wagon marketed as the Dodge/Plymouth "Colt Vista"; a rebadged Mitsubishi Chariot. A twin-barrel carbureted 68 hp (51 kW) 1468 cc four was the Colt's base engine, while the 4G32BT turbocharged 1.6-litre already seen in the last model year of the previous Colts was optional on the upscale Premier four-door sedan and standard on the GTS Turbo hatchback. Power for the turbocharged variant remained 102 hp (76 kW) at 5500 rpm, as for the previous generation. A first for FWD Colts was the availability of a three-box four-door sedan body; it and the 3-door hatchback were available in the US from 1985 to 1988; the 5-door hatchback only in 1985 (and only in base E trim) and the wagon not until 1988. The five-door hatchback was only available for a single model year as Chrysler was worried about this car cannibalizing sales of their own Omni/Horizon. The five-door was replaced by the E sedan for 1986. In Canada, the five-door hatchback was also available in DL trim.

Beginning in January 1988, Chrysler Canada began sourcing Colts from Thailand, assembled there from Japanese parts, planning on bringing in 8,000 cars per annum. Thai Colts were imported to Canada until 1994. From 1988 (and lasting until 1991), the Colt/Mirage was also marketed as the Eagle Vista in Canada.

Early cars have small rectangular headlights in black inserts, while later models received more aerodynamic, flush-fitting units. The facelift model appeared for the 1987 model year, presented in late September 1986. The lowest-priced model was the "E" (for economy), followed by the "DL" and topped by the turbocharged but slow selling Premier and GTS Turbo models. In 1987 the turbocharged engine became an option for the DL hatchback, which replaced the GTS. Power for the turbo versions crept up to 105 hp (78 kW) for the 1988 model year. The DL Turbo remained available through 1988. 1988 also marked the introduction of the wagon, initially only available with front-wheel drive. Unlike the remainder of the lineup, the 1988 wagon received a fuel injected version of the 1.5-liter engine which produces 75 hp (56 kW) at 5500 rpm.

The Colt wagon, while never available with the turbocharged engine, did receive a more powerful 1,755 cc engine in the four-wheel-drive version which was added for 1989. The Wagon was only ever offered in DL trim. Unlike the FWD version, the DL 4x4 was not available with an automatic transmission. The larger engine produces 87 hp (65 kW). For the final year of the fifth generation Colt in the United States, the DL model received fully body-colored trim (including bumpers, mirrors, and so on) for what Plymouth referred to as a "dipped look."

While the hatchback Colts were replaced for 1989 in the United States, the Colt Wagon continued to be available until the 1991 introduction of the Mitsubishi RVR-based Colt Wagon, which also replaced the Colt Vista. The late Colt Wagons of this generation received the newer, twin cam Sirius 1.6-liter engine with 113 hp (84 kW) when equipped with front-wheel drive. This model was also marketed as the Eagle Vista Wagon in Canada. In Canada, this generation Colt sedans and hatchbacks also continued to be offered alongside the next generation under the 'Colt 100' moniker, as a lower-priced alternative to the new model which was badged "Colt 200". The Colt 100 was still available with the turbo engine as well as in luxuriously appointed LX trim in 1990, but by 1991 only the E and DL models remained.

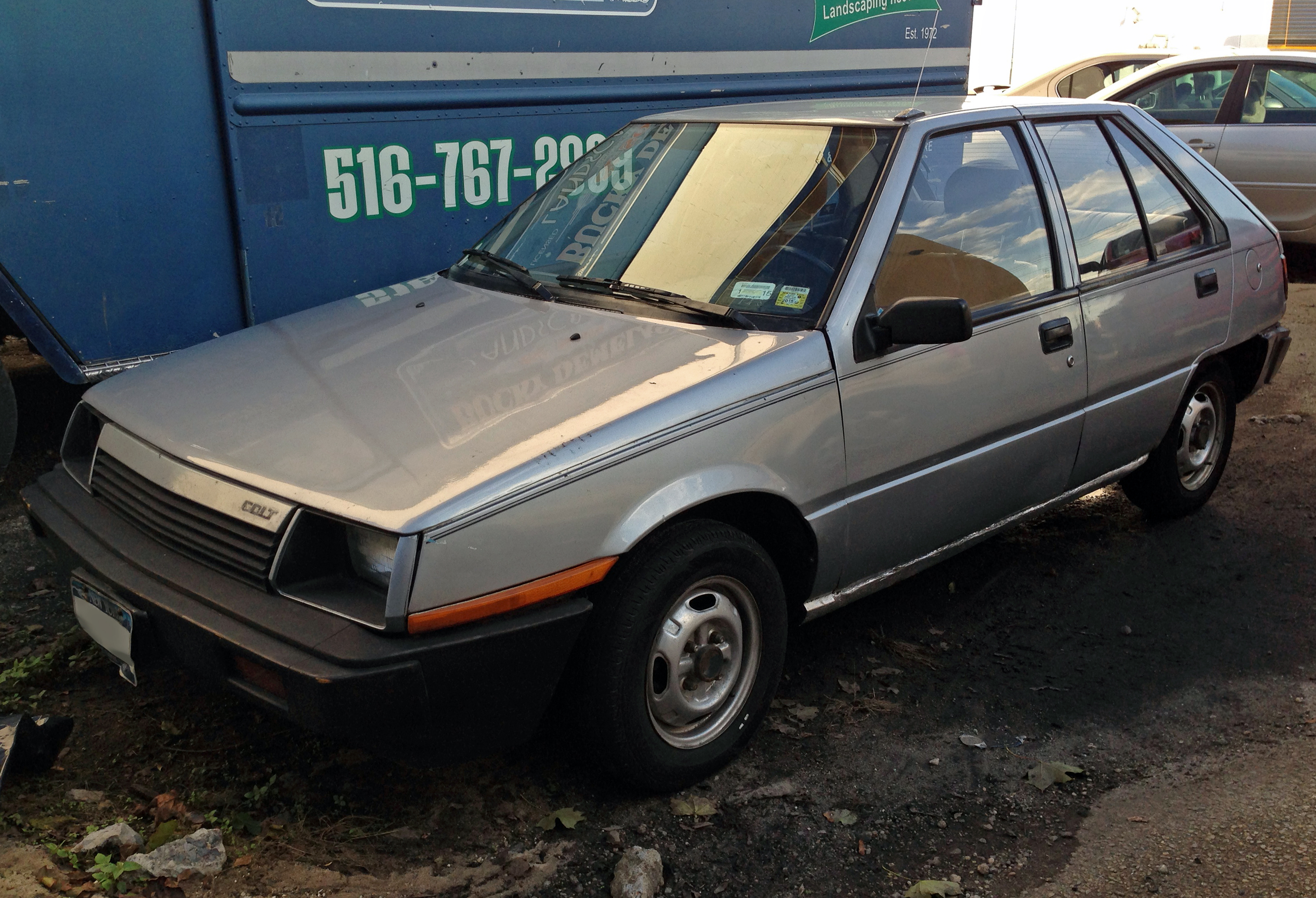
1985 Dodge Colt E five-door (US)

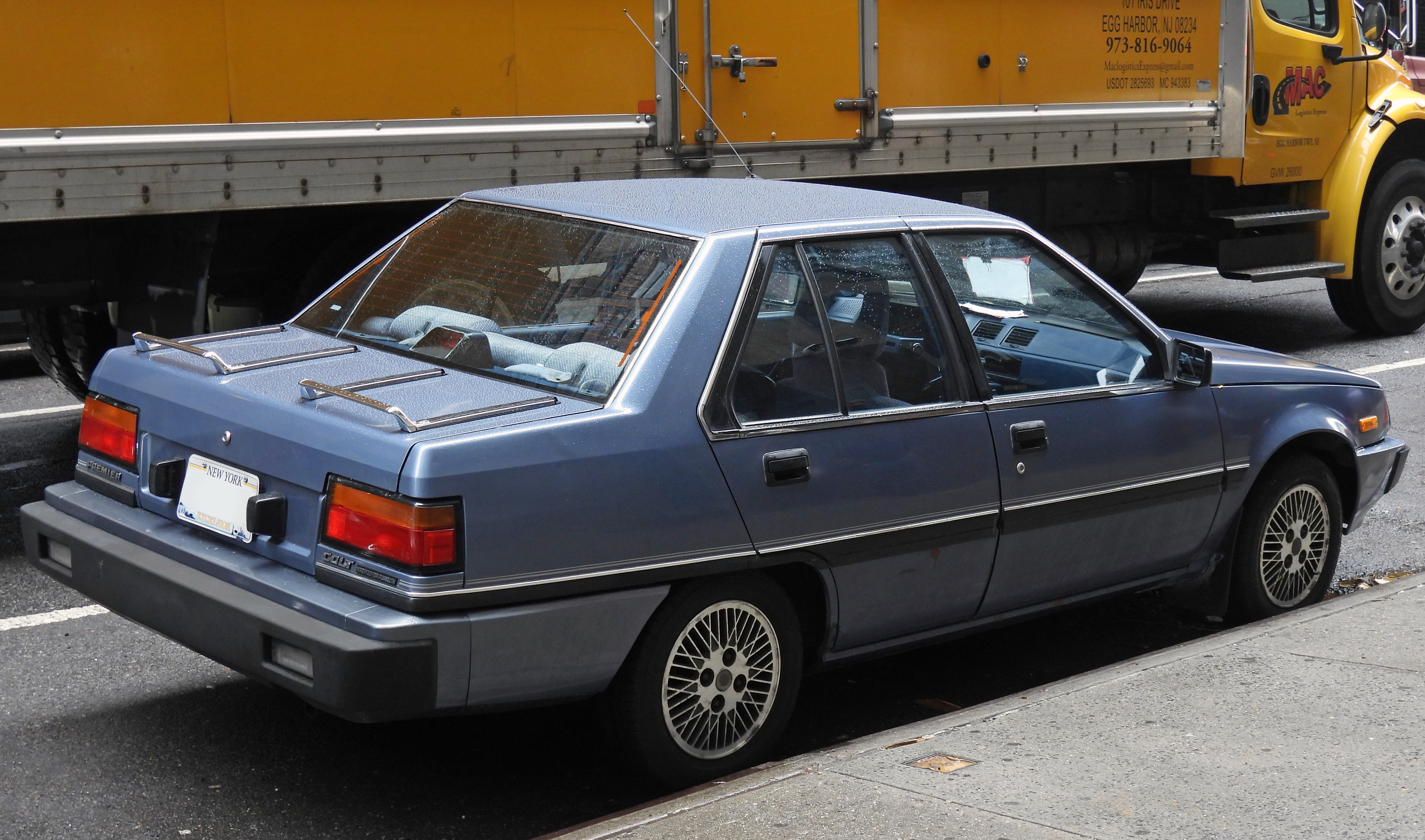
1987 Plymouth Colt Premier sedan (US)

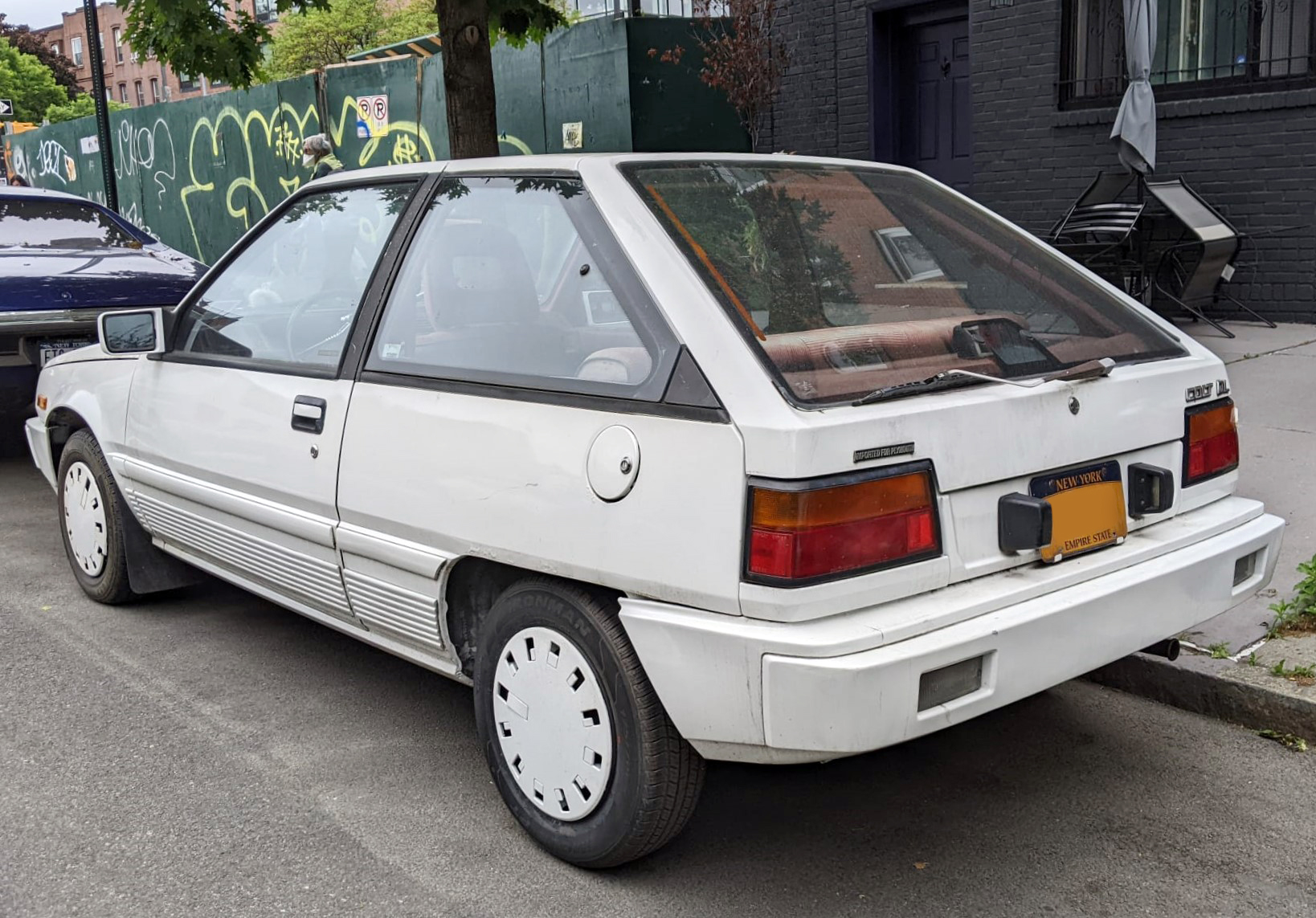
1988 Dodge Colt DL in model-year specific monochrome trim

== Sixth generation (1989–1992) ==
Sixth generation
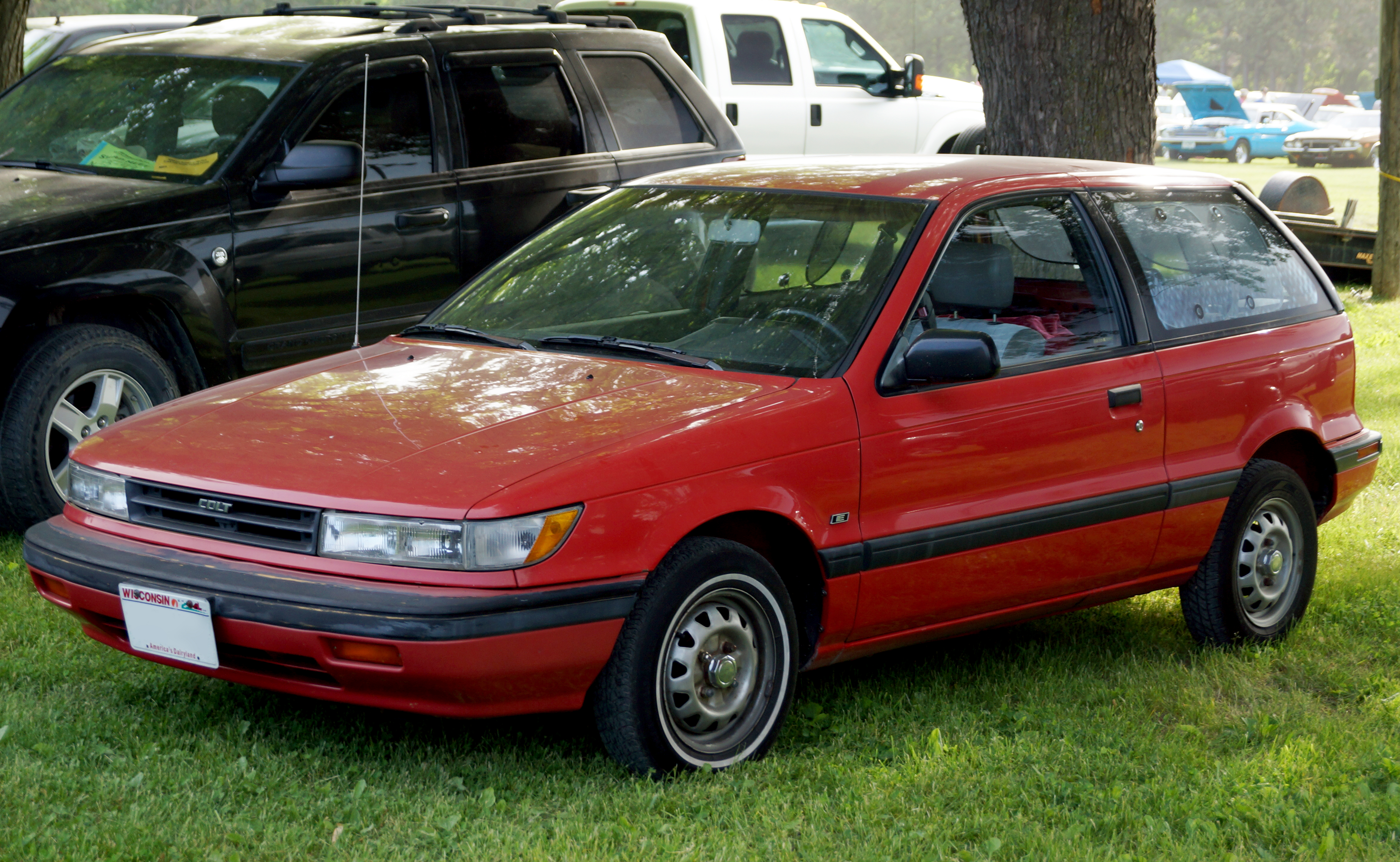
- 1989 Dodge Colt

Overview
- Also called: Mitsubishi Mirage/Lancer; Plymouth Colt; Eagle Summit
- Production: 1989–1992
- Assembly: Kurashiki, Okayama, Japan (Hatchback); Normal, Illinois (Sedans)

Body and chassis
- Body style: 3-door hatchback 4-door sedan
- Layout: FF layout

Powertrain
- Engine: 1.5 L 4G15 I4; 1.6 L 4G61 DOHC I4; 1.6 L 4G61T DOHC turbo I4
- Transmission: 3-speed automatic 4-speed manual 5-speed manual

Dimensions
- Wheelbase: 93.9 in (2,385 mm)
- Length: 158.7 in (4,031 mm)
- Width: 65.5 in (1,664 mm)
- Height: 52.0 in (1,321 mm)

For the 1989 model year, Eagle began marketing its Summit as another rebadged Mitsubishi Mirage. Sales started in August 1988. In Canada, the previous generation continued as a carryover model with Eagle Vista or Colt 100 badging, replacing the earlier Colt sedan. The new model was sold as the Dodge/Plymouth 'Colt 200' in Canada, to distinguish it from the previous version.

Since the demise of the Dodge Omni/Plymouth Horizon in 1990, the Colt was the only subcompact in the Dodge and Plymouth lineups. The Colt sedan was not sold in the United States for the sixth generation (though it was sold in Canada), as it would be replaced by the Dodge Shadow/Plymouth Sundance liftbacks in the Dodge/Plymouth lineup for 1989. The sedan bodywork, however, was available to American consumers as an Eagle Summit. Dodge and Plymouth Colt sedans returned for 1993–1994 as a variant of the next-generation Eagle Summit. The Dodge/Plymouth Colt, Eagle Summit, and Mitsubishi Mirage of this generation used 1.5 or 1.6-litre inline-four engines.

A model powered by the 1.6-litre 4G61T 135 hp (101 kW) turbocharged four-cylinder was produced for the 1989 model year only. There are a rumored 1,500 of these special editions to have been produced. The engine was only offered in the Mirage and the Colt GT Turbo, which were distinguished by their ground effects and spoilers (although these parts were also available for a price as add-ons to other model ranges) and by their extra features not normally found on base model ranges such as power seats, power windows, power locks, and power mirrors, special colored interior and seats, as well as a 150 mph/9000 rpm gauge cluster. The Turbo Colt/Mirage Turbo was one of Car and Driver magazine's Ten Best for 1989. A naturally aspirated version of this engine was available for the following years Colt GT, with power down to 113 hp.

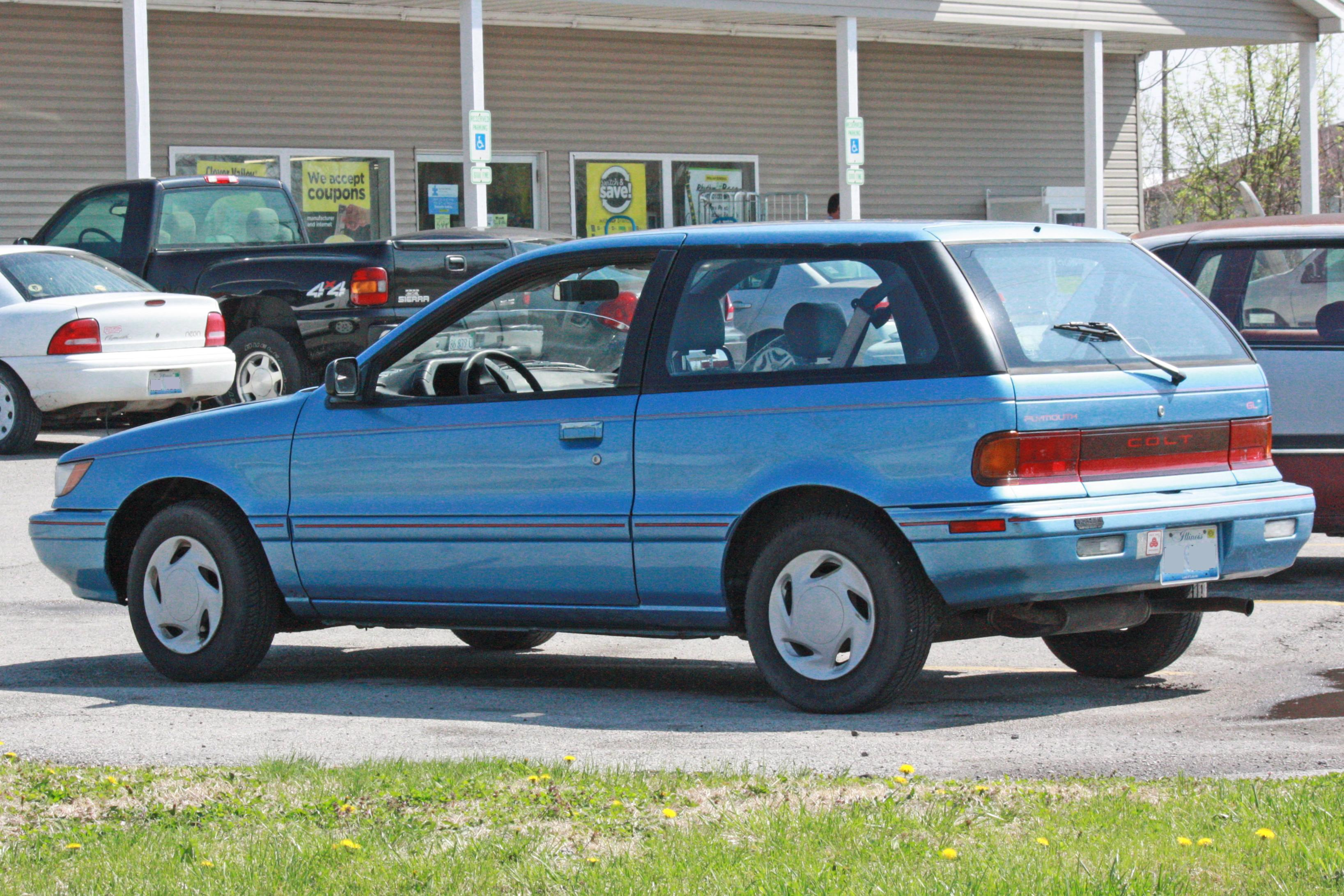
Sixth generation Plymouth Colt 3-door

Power of the 1.5-litre 4G15 was up to 82 hp (61 kW) thanks to multi-point fuel injection. Top speed was 160 km/h (99 mph).

The Colt Wagon was redesigned in 1991, now based on the RVR, and continued in production until the 1996 model year.

== Seventh generation (1993–1995) ==
Seventh generation
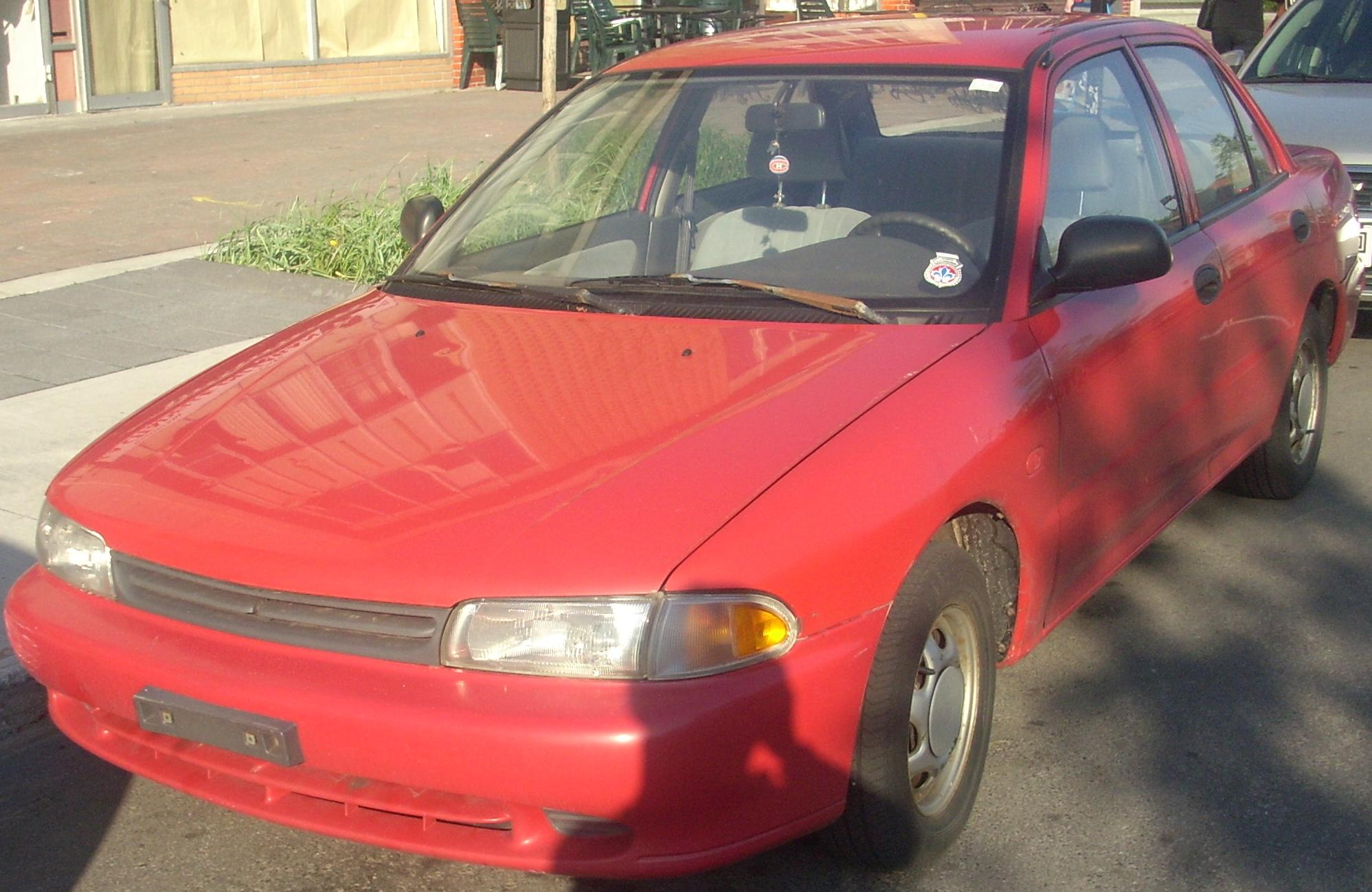
- 1993-1994 Plymouth Colt

Overview
- Also called: Mitsubishi Mirage; Eagle Summit; Plymouth Colt
- Production: 1993–1994 (USA); 1993-1995 (Canada)

Body and chassis
- Body style: 2-door coupe 4-door sedan 3-door van (see Mitsubishi RVR)
- Layout: FF layout
- Related: Mitsubishi Lancer

Powertrain
- Engine: 1.5 L 4G15 I4; 1.8 L 4G93 16V I4
- Transmission: 5-speed manual 3/4-speed automatic

Dimensions
- Wheelbase: Sedan: 98.4 in (2,499 mm); Coupe: 96.1 in (2,441 mm)
- Length: Sedan: 174.0 in (4,420 mm); Coupe: 171.1 in (4,346 mm)
- Width: Base: 66.1 in (1,679 mm); ES: 66.5 in (1,689 mm)
- Height: Sedan: 51.4 in (1,306 mm); Coupe: 51.6 in (1,311 mm)

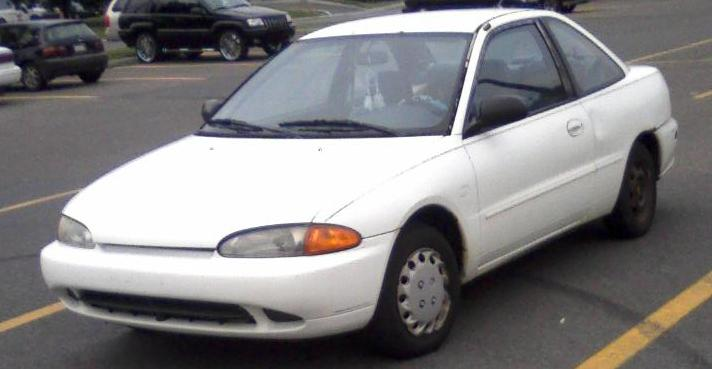
Plymouth Colt GL coupe

The seventh generation of the Colt was the same as Plymouth's version, and also the same as the Eagle Summit. As usual, they were all simply badge-engineered versions of the Mitsubishi Mirage/Lancer. There was no hatchback version of the seventh generation Dodge/Plymouth Colt. Originally available in Base and GL versions, the ES (with supposedly more sporting intentions) was added later.

1.5 and 1.8 litre four-cylinder engines were used, with the larger engine originally only available to four-door Colts. While the sporting variants offered in the sixth generation were not renewed, the two-door ES was available with the more powerful sixteen-valve SOHC 1.8 for the 1994 model year. The smaller engine has 92 hp (69 kW) while the larger version has 113 hp (84 kW). The previous Colt Wagon (Mitsubishi RVR) continued to be sold until 1996, while the Dodge and Plymouth Colts were replaced by the new Neon after the 1994 model year.

== Related versions ==
The Plymouth Cricket nameplate was used (in addition to Dodge Colt) on Galants sold in Canada between mid-1973 and 1975, after Chrysler stopped using the Plymouth Cricket name for a rebadged Hillman Avenger-based model sourced from the United Kingdom (and sold across North America between 1971 and 1973).

The Plymouth Arrow was offered from 1976 to 1980 as a rebadged version of the Mitsubishi Lancer Celeste, not to be confused with the rebadged Mitsubishi truck sold as the Plymouth Arrow starting in 1979.
