= Mitsubishi Tredia =

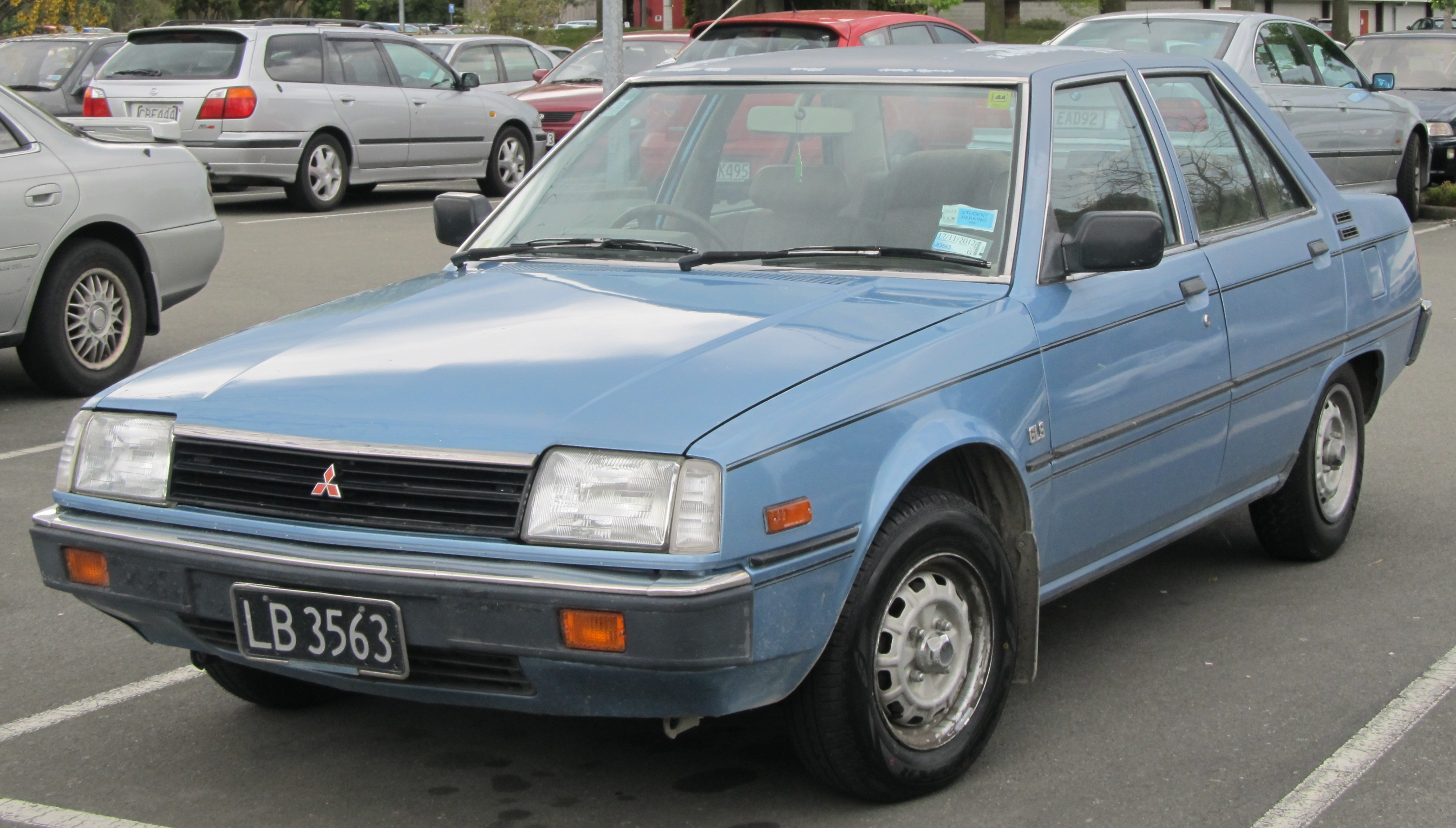

Overview
- Manufacturer: Mitsubishi Motors
- Production: 1982–1990
- Assembly: Japan: Okazaki, Aichi (Nagoya Plant); New Zealand: Porirua, Wellington (Todd Motors); Malaysia: Johor; South Africa: Silverton, Pretoria (SMC)
- Designer: Takio Nakagawa

Body and chassis
- Class: Subcompact
- Body style: 4-door sedan
- Layout: Front engine, front-/four-wheel drive
- Related: Mitsubishi Cordia

Powertrain
- Engine: 1410 cc 4G12 I4; 1597 cc 4G32 I4; 1597 cc 4G32T turbo I4; 1755 cc 4G37 I4; 1795 cc 4G62 I4; 1795 cc 4G62T turbo I4; 1997 cc 4G63 I4
- Transmission: 5-speed manual 8-speed Super Shift manual 3-speed automatic

Dimensions
- Wheelbase: 2,445 mm (96.3 in)
- Length: 4,280 mm (168.5 in); 4,380 mm (172.4 in) (USA)
- Width: 1,660 mm (65.4 in)
- Height: 1,310–1,370 mm (51.6–53.9 in)
- Curb weight: 950–1,086 kg (2,094–2,394 lb)

Chronology
- Successor: Mitsubishi Lancer

The Mitsubishi Tredia is a subcompact sedan built by Mitsubishi Motors from 1982 to 1990. Its name is supposedly derived from Mitsubishi's "Three Diamonds" logo. Alongside the Cordia and Starion, it was one of the first cars imported and sold to America (and Panama) by the company without the involvement of its then partner, the Chrysler Corporation. In Japan, it was sold at a specific retail chain called Car Plaza.

== Overview ==
Designed to fit between the existing Galant and Lancer models to increase the overall lineup of passenger vehicles, the Cordia and Tredia used front-wheel drive and were similar in design to the contemporary Mirage (although larger). They incorporated a MacPherson strut/independent trailing arm suspension, front disc brakes, manual or electrically controlled automatic transmission, and a choice of three engines: a 1.4 L rated at 68 PS (50 kW), a 1.6 L rated at 75 PS (55 kW) and a 115 PS (85 kW) turbocharged 1.6 L, which was the first such engine to be sold in Japan. The 1600 Turbo received alloy wheels, a hood scoop, and a sticker/stripe combo along the flank. It also benefitted from stiffer suspension than its brethren. Some smaller export markets also received a carb-fed 2.0 L rated at 110 PS (81 kW).

The Tredia was usually offered with comparably complete equipment, usually including rear headrests, adjustable steering wheel, and a graphic heat and ventilation indicator (colored arrows showing how the air moves around the cabin). As with the Mirage/Colt on which the Tredia was based, the standard transmission was Mitsubishi's Super Shift with high and low gears, giving eight forward speeds. This was also installed in the Turbo models. Later on, a regular five-speed gearbox replaced the Super Shift in many models, although it continued to be available until the Tredia was discontinued in 1990.

The cars were given a mild facelift in 1983, and four-wheel drive was offered beginning in October 1984. On the Tredia, four-wheel drive was only offered in combination with the 1.8-liter Saturn engine with 105 PS (77 kW) in Japanese market trim. The engine range was overhauled in 1985 to allow the cars to run on unleaded fuel, including the introduction of a 1.8 L engine in both 100 PS (74 kW) naturally aspirated and 135 PS (99 kW) turbocharged form, before production was discontinued in 1990.

=== Market specifics ===
The Tredia (and Cordia) entered most European markets in October 1982. In several countries it acted as the replacement for the rear-wheel-drive Lancer, although they were built in parallel for many years. The main engine installed was the 75 PS (55 kW) 1.6-litre, later this was joined by the 1.8-liter 90 PS (66 kW) Saturn engine, fitted with a regular five-speed transmission and also available with four-wheel drive. There was also a turbocharged version of the 1.6 which produces 114 PS (84 kW) at 5500 rpm in European trim.

U.S. market cars were of a somewhat different appearance, with considerably larger bumpers and unintegrated sealed-beam headlights. In the U.S. the Tredia was available in Base, L, and LS specs with the 2-liter G63B engine (88 hp or 66 kW) and the Turbo, with the 1.8 litre G62B with 116 hp (87 kW).

The Tredia was assembled, alongside the Cordia with which it shared many 'under the skin' parts, in New Zealand by Todd Motors, later Mitsubishi New Zealand. The cars were imported as CKD kits and were built with about 40% local content including glass, upholstery, carpet, wiring harnesses and radiators. Both normally aspirated and turbocharged versions were made. All models were initially 1.6-litre but the normally aspirated model was later changed to a 1.8-litre engine at the same time as the original 4x2 'Supershift' manual transmission was changed to a conventional five-speed gearbox. Normally aspirated models were also offered with a conventional three-speed automatic gearbox. In 1985 Todd's added an additional automatic-only 1.8SE trim version with two-tone paint, power windows and locks and four-speaker factory-fit audio system.

== Gallery ==
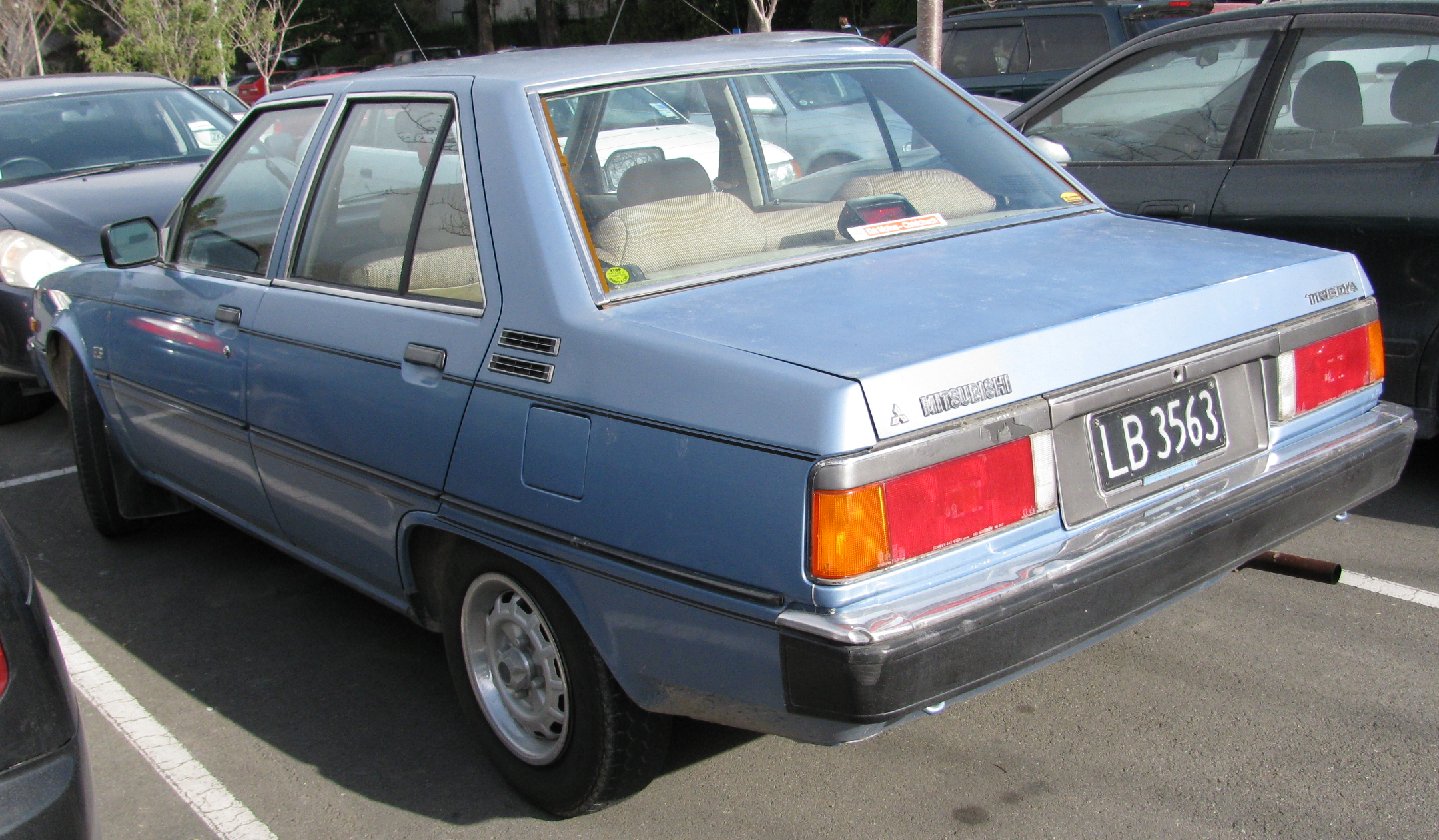
Rear view of 1983 1.6 GLS (NZ)

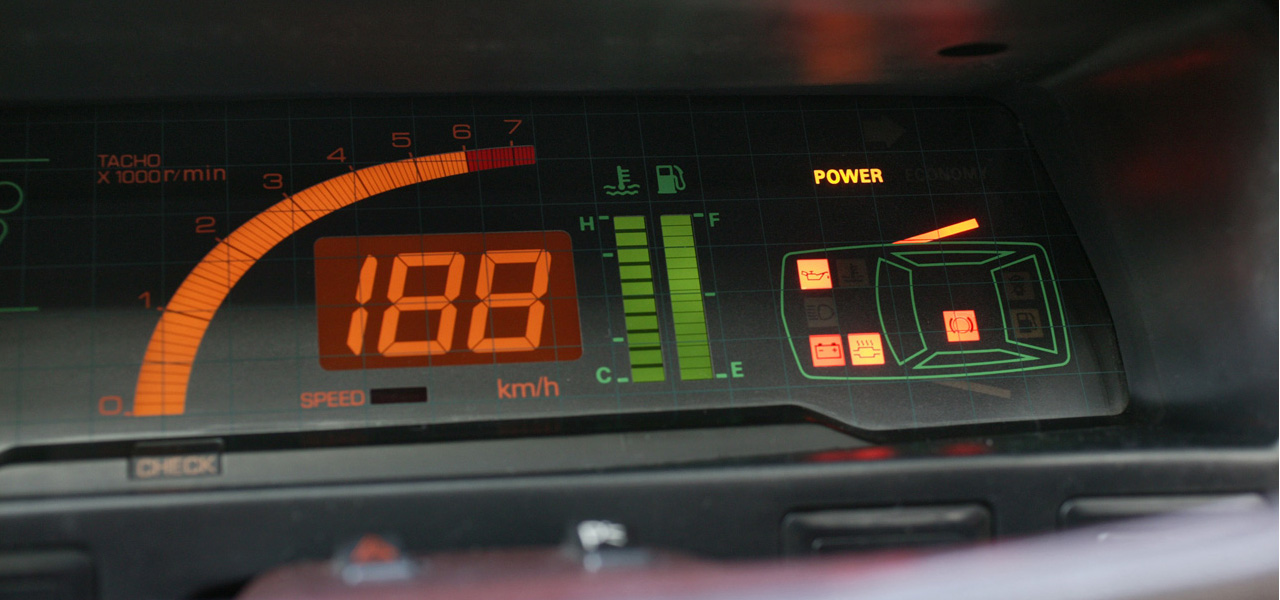
The optional digital dashboard used in both the Tredia and Cordia.

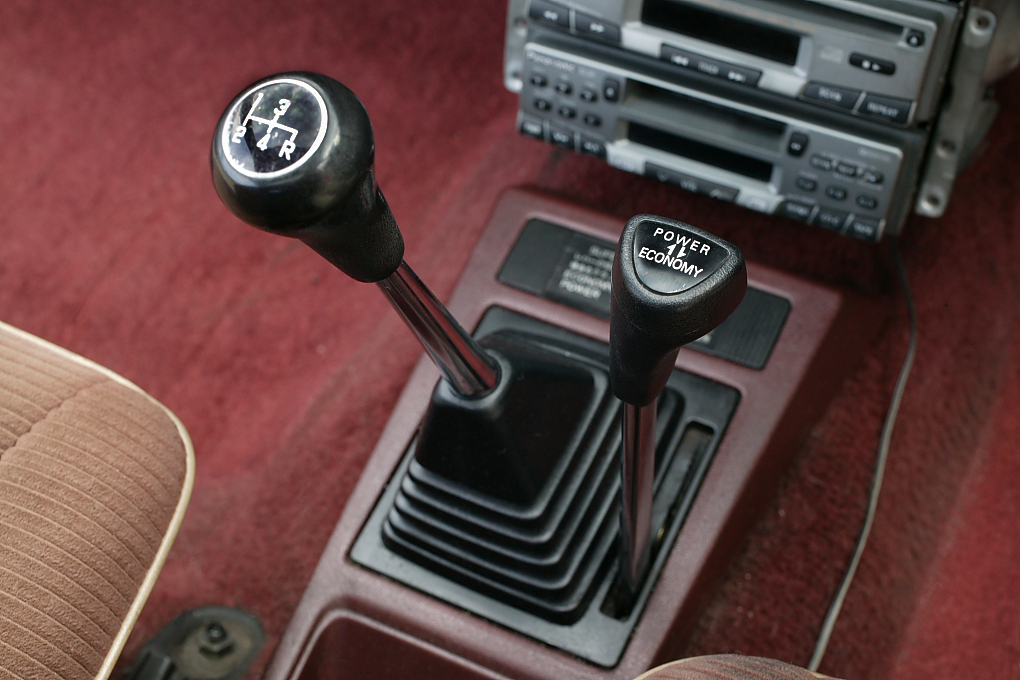
The optional 8 speed Super Shift dual-mode manual gearbox used in both the Tredia and Cordia.
