= Mitsubishi Cordia =

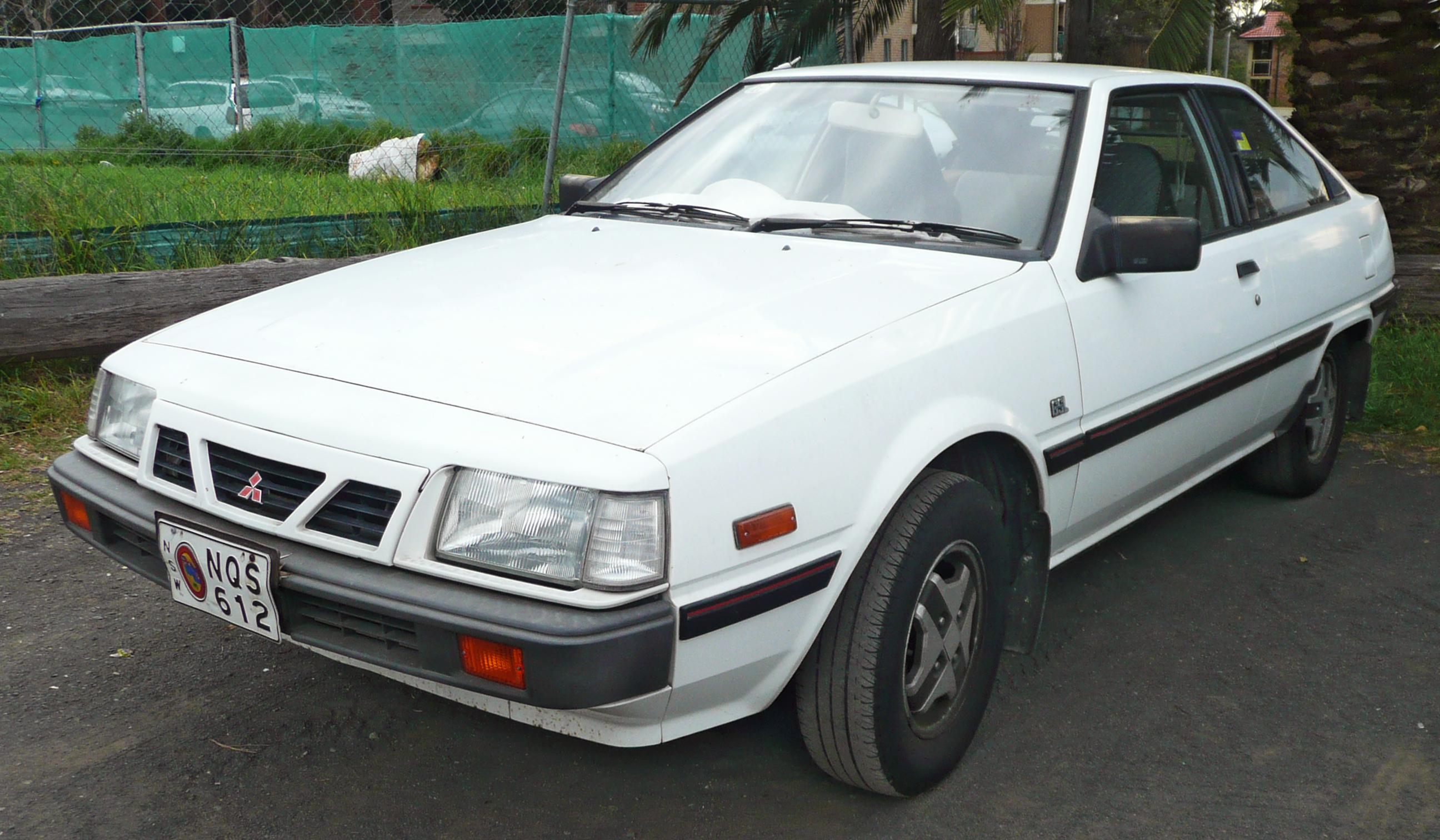

Overview
- Manufacturer: Mitsubishi Motors
- Production: 1982–1990
- Assembly: Japan: Okazaki, Aichi (Nagoya Plant)
- Designer: Akinori Nakanishi

Body and chassis
- Class: Compact car
- Body style: 3-door liftback coupé
- Layout: Front-engine, front-wheel-drive Front-engine, four-wheel-drive
- Platform: A211A-A213A
- Related: Mitsubishi Tredia; Mitsubishi Galant

Powertrain
- Engine: 1410 cc 4G12 I4; 1597 cc 4G32 I4; 1597 cc 4G32T turbo I4; 1755 cc 4G37 I4; 1795 cc 4G62 I4; 1795 cc 4G62T turbo I4; 1997 cc 4G63 I4
- Transmission: 2×4-speed Super Shift manual 5-speed manual 3-speed automatic 4-speed automatic

Dimensions
- Wheelbase: 2,445 mm (96.3 in)
- Length: 4,275 mm (168.3 in)
- Width: 1,660 mm (65.4 in)
- Height: 1,320 mm (52.0 in)
- Curb weight: 905–960 kg (1,995–2,116 lb)

Chronology
- Predecessor: Mitsubishi Lancer Celeste
- Successor: Mitsubishi Eclipse

The Mitsubishi Cordia is a compact hatchback-coupé manufactured by Mitsubishi Motors between 1982 and 1990. Alongside the Tredia and Starion, the Cordia is one of the first cars imported and sold in the United States by Mitsubishi without the help of Chrysler Corporation, which owned a stake in Mitsubishi and sold its models as captive imports. The Cordia XP was the model sold at the Japanese Car Plaza retail chain, while the Cordia XG was sold at the Galant Shop chain. The Cordia XG model had a somewhat smaller front grille.

The Cordia was one of the first mass-market cars to offer an optional electronic instrument cluster using a liquid-crystal display (LCD).

== Overview ==
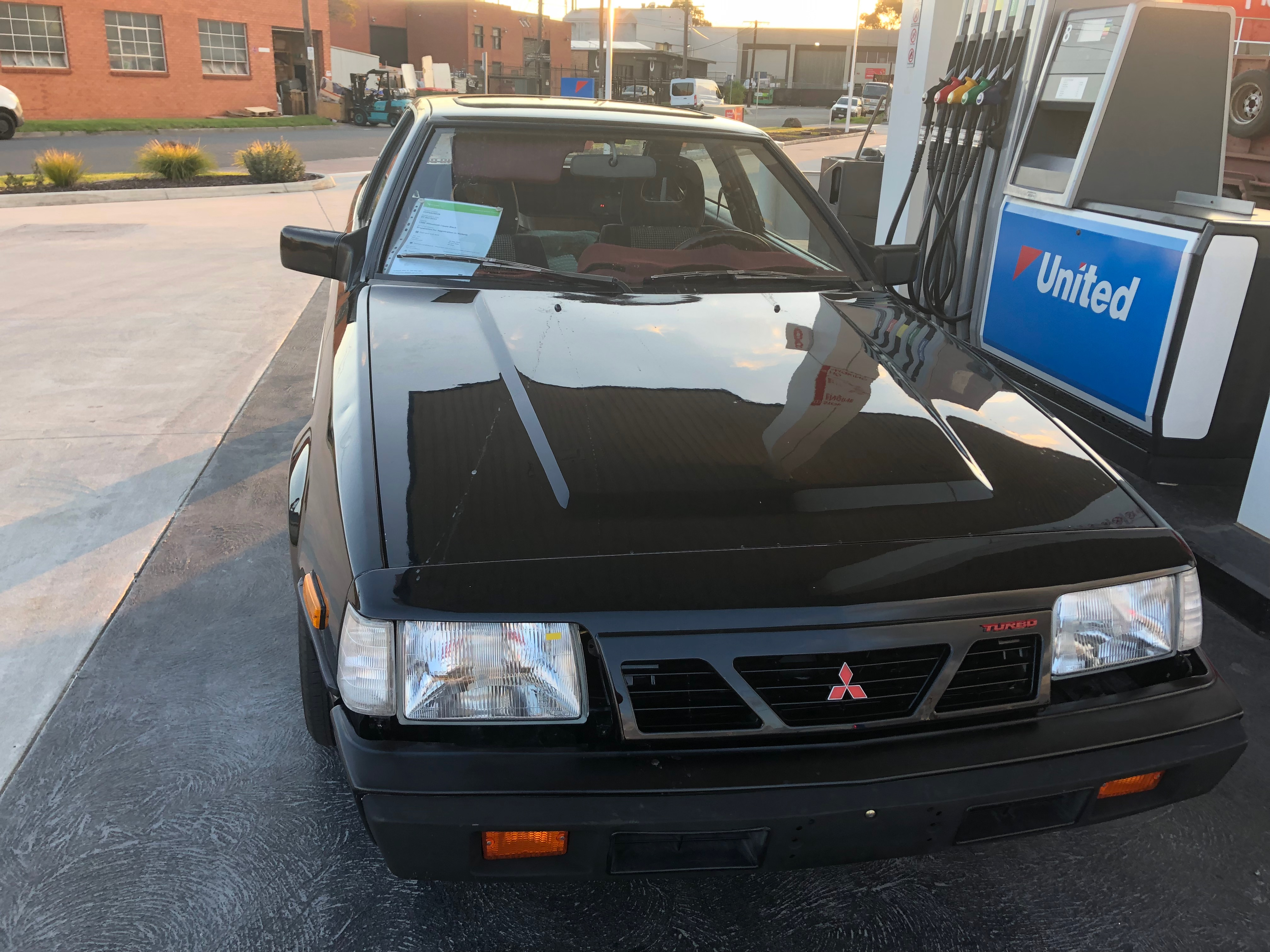
1987 USDM Cordia with crash resistant bumper

Offered between the existing Mitsubishi Starion, Galant and Lancer models, the Cordia (along with the Tredia) used front-wheel drive and was similar in design to the Mirage, with the exception of its larger size. To further set the Cordia apart from its saloon counterpart, it received a deeper fascia which embraced the driver.

Mitsubishi incorporated MacPherson strut/beam axle suspension, front disc brakes, manual or automatic transmission, and a choice of three engines: a 68 hp 1.4-litre, a 74–87 hp (55–65 kW) 1.6-litre, and a 112 hp (84 kW) turbocharged 1.6-litre engine. Some export markets also received a carb-fed 110 hp (82 kW) 1.6-litre. a US version of the 2.0-litre generated 88 hp (66 kW) for the 1984 model.

The cars received a mild facelift in 1983, and the option of four-wheel drive was offered in 1984 in Japanese domestic markets. The engines were modified in 1985 to allow the cars to run on unleaded fuel with the introduction of a 1.8-litre in both 100 hp (74 kW) naturally aspirated and Turbocharged variants output at 135 hp (99 kW) in Europe and the UK and 116 hp (86.5kw) in the USA to cope with the lower 87 octane unleaded gasoline. The Cordia sold in the United States until the 1988 model year. Japanese manufacture was discontinued in 1990.

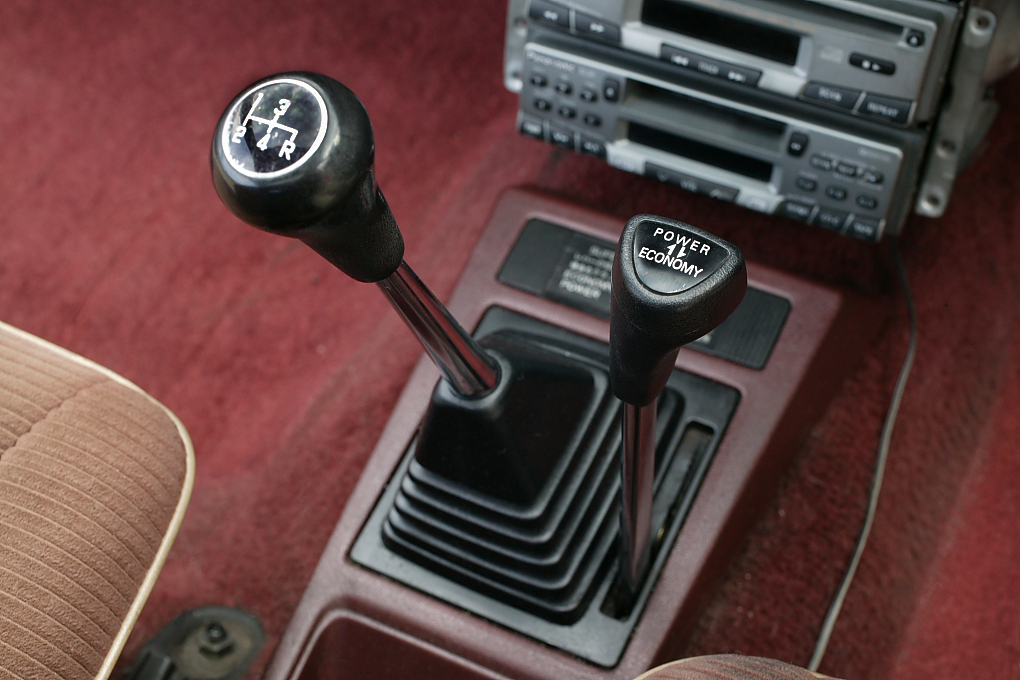
The optional 8-speed Super Shift dual-mode manual gearbox

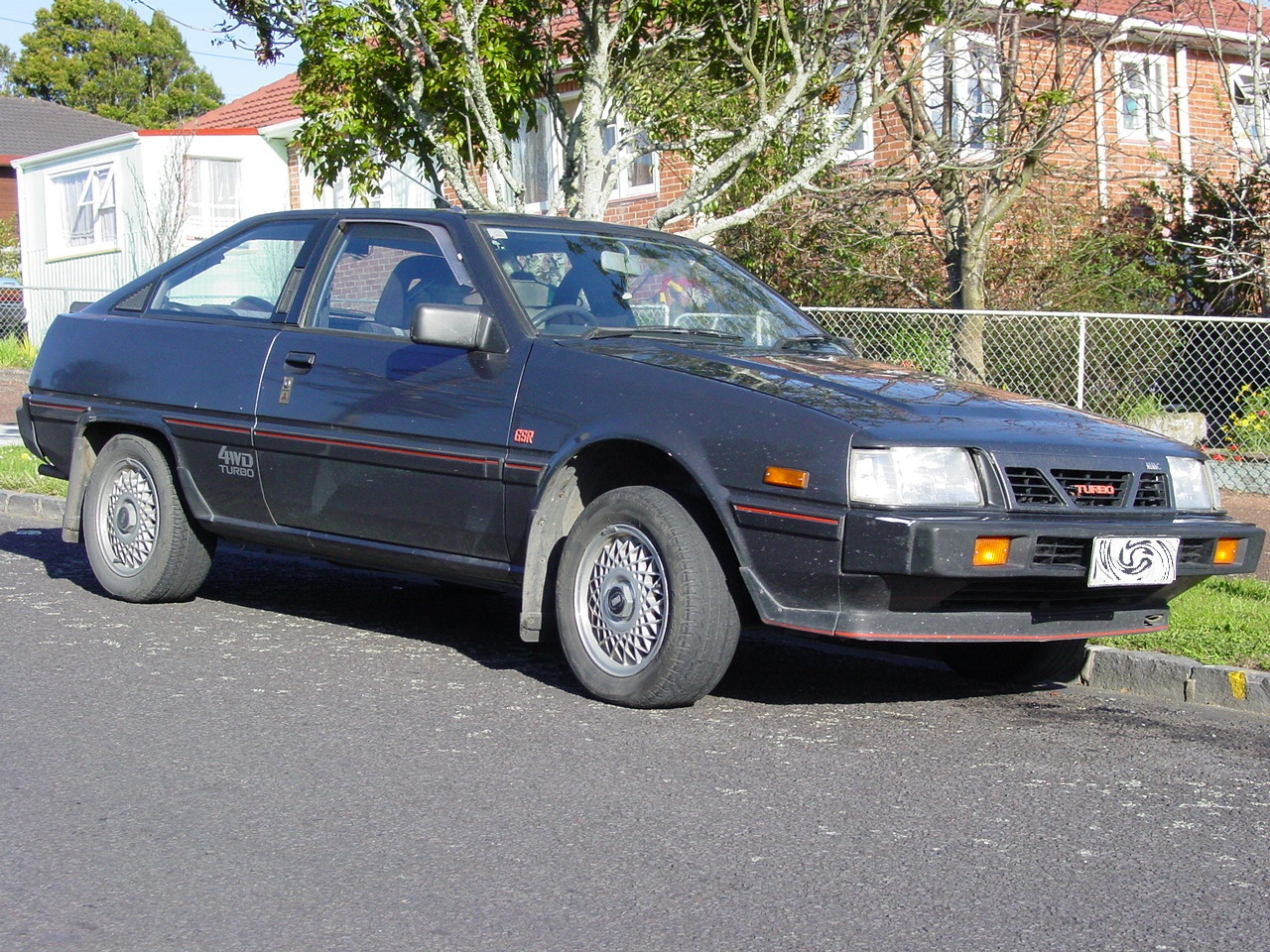
1986 Cordia GSR 4WD (Japan)

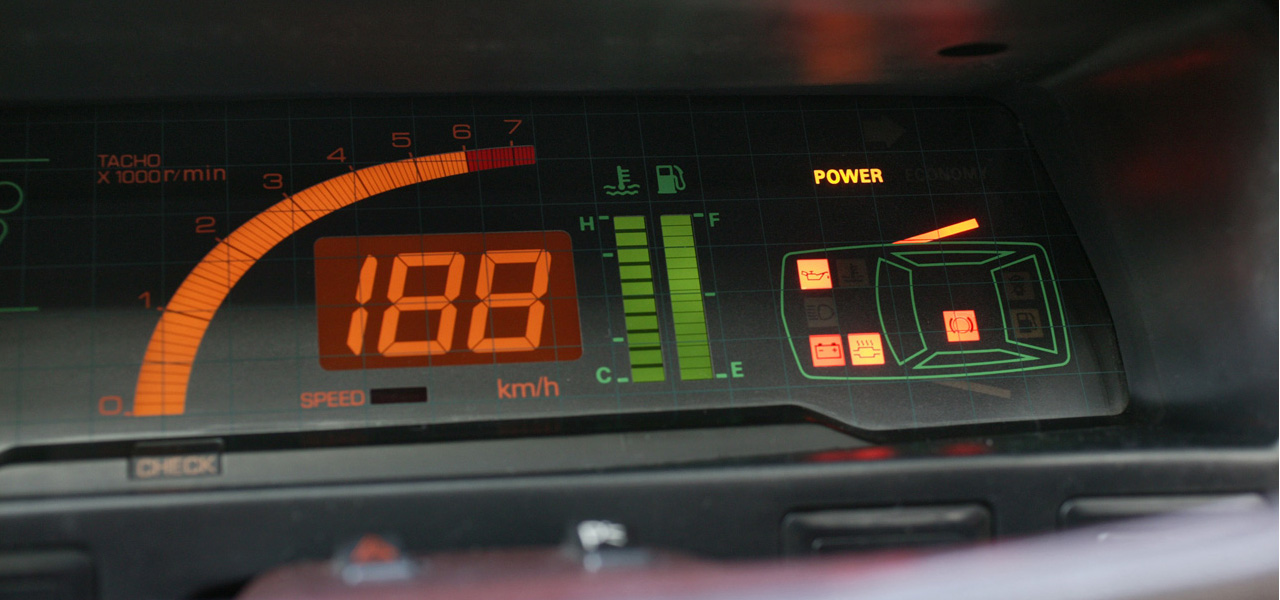
The optional digital dashboard

In Australia, the Cordia AA series was released in late 1983. An update, titled AB Series, arrived with a different grille, upgraded interior other minor changes in 1984. The final AC model was modified to run on unleaded fuel in late 1985. Production ceased in 1988. Two trim levels were available, the naturally aspirated 1.8-litre GSL and the turbocharged GSR. The early (leaded) GSRs were fitted with 13-inch alloy wheels; unleaded cars came fitted with chrome alloy 14-inch wheels. The 1800 Turbocharged Cordias were considered great performers at the time in the Australian market, which produced 110 kW (150 hp) at 6,000 rpm. It was able to achieve the 1/4 mile (400 metres) in 15.9 seconds and a top speed of over 200 km/h (124 mph), strong performance for a 1.8-liter car in the mid-1980s and boasting similar performance to cars approximately 3 times its price, making it the performance bargain of the mid-1980s in Australia.

When released in mid 1984 with its 4G62T 8-valve ECI (Electronically Controlled Injection) engine, the GSR AA and AB Turbo versions were something of a four-cylinder performance phenomenon, exciting the Australian motoring press and car enthusiasts alike. The last incarnation of the GSR, the AC model, was officially released January 1, 1986 to comply to the Australian government's new emissions requirements and was heavily detuned to run on the 91 octane unleaded fuel available at the time; output was dropped by almost 20 percent to 90KW to cope with this. This markedly reduced the performance of both the normally aspirated and turbocharged models.

The GSR was trialled as a pursuit car by NSW Police, and was reportedly the first Turbocharged vehicle used by Australian Police.

The USA version had the enhanced low speed crash resistant deeper bumpers which were also used on the NZ Turbocharged variants.

The places where these cars met with most enthusiastic success was in Australia and New Zealand. The success of the Cordia was based on its performance to cost ratio.

In New Zealand the Cordia was assembled, with the Tredia that it is based on, first by Todd Motors, and later by Mitsubishi New Zealand. The cars were imported as CKD kits and were built with about 41% local content including glass, upholstery, carpet, wiring harnesses and radiators. Both naturally aspirated engine models and turbocharged versions were made. NZ did not have an unleaded petrol version and when ULP was introduced in the nineties, the naturally aspirated GSL ran on premium unleaded petrol without any modification.
