= Mitsubishi Super Shift transmission =

Manual transmission by Mitsubishi Motors

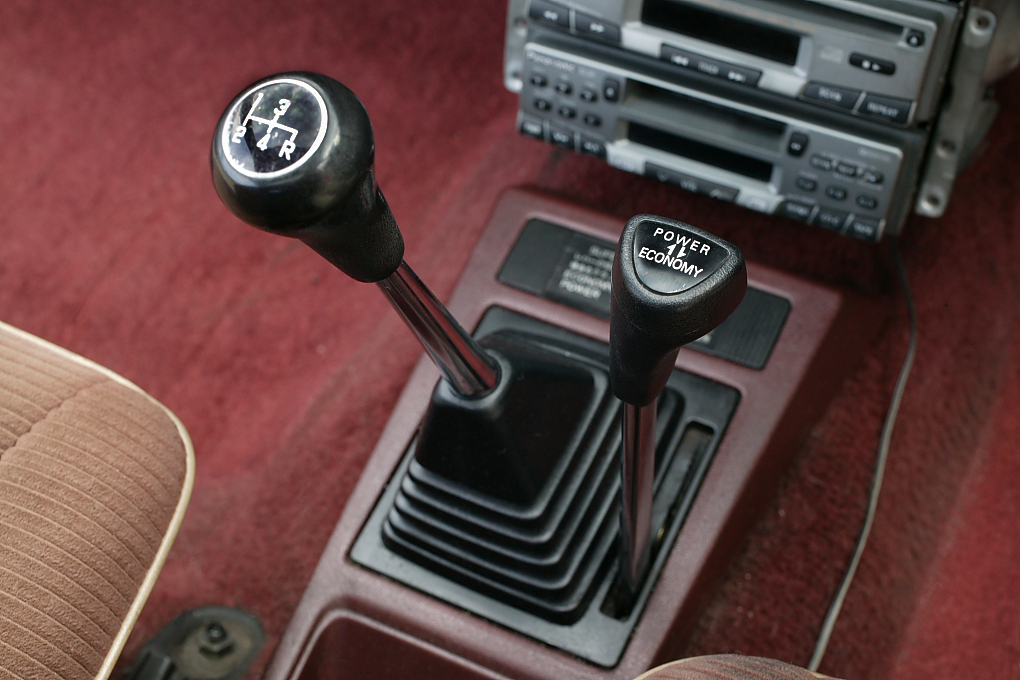
Super Shift transmission levers in a Mitsubishi Cordia

The Super Shift transmission, also marketed as Twin-Stick, was a manual transaxle transmission developed by Mitsubishi Motors in the late 1970s and used in a limited number of the company's road cars, most of which were manufactured in the 1980s. It was unusual in that it had 8 forward speeds in a 4x2 arrangement. It essentially installed a "married" overdrive unit to its manual transmission, something rare in a production vehicle of this type.

== Overview ==
The Super Shift gearbox was developed from a standard four-speed manual transmission for use in the first generation Mitsubishi Mirage, the company's first front wheel drive model. Because the transmission was mounted beneath the engine, the gearbox needed to take power down from the clutch. It was not possible to do this directly as this would have meant that the gearbox rotated in the opposite direction to that required, and therefore the use of an extra 'idle' shaft was required. It was subsequently realised that this shaft could be modified as a separate 2-speed gearbox, which would be controlled by a secondary shift lever mounted alongside the main gear shift lever inside the cabin.

This resulted in a transmission with a typical 4 speed 'H' pattern shift mechanism, plus an additional 2 speed 'high-low' selector which effectively split each of the 4 speed gears in two. This meant 8 forward gears in total. It was also possible to use the 2 speed selector in reverse, meaning that two reverse gears also existed. In the majority of cars, the 2 speed selector was labelled as 'Power' for the lower range, and 'Economy' for the higher range. In some cars the 2 speed selector was labelled with a star icon for the lower range and 'E' (economy) for the higher range. A dashboard light system was used to indicate which mode was selected.

In practice, it was very difficult to use all 8 forward speeds in sequence because every second change required movement of both gear levers at the same time - something which was almost impossible without using both hands. Many owners settled on using the transmission in low 'Power' mode the majority of the time, and only using the secondary selector to select high 'Economy' mode when in 4th gear, effectively creating a 5th gear from 4th 'high'.

Production of the Super Shift transmission ended in 1990 with the discontinuation of the Tredia and Cordia series of vehicles.

== Usage ==
The Super Shift gearbox was fitted to the following vehicles:

- Dodge Colt
- Mitsubishi Mirage
- Mitsubishi Colt
- Mitsubishi Cordia
- Mitsubishi Tredia
- Mitsubishi Chariot
