= Mitsubishi Lancer (A70) =

First generation of Mitsubishi Lancer

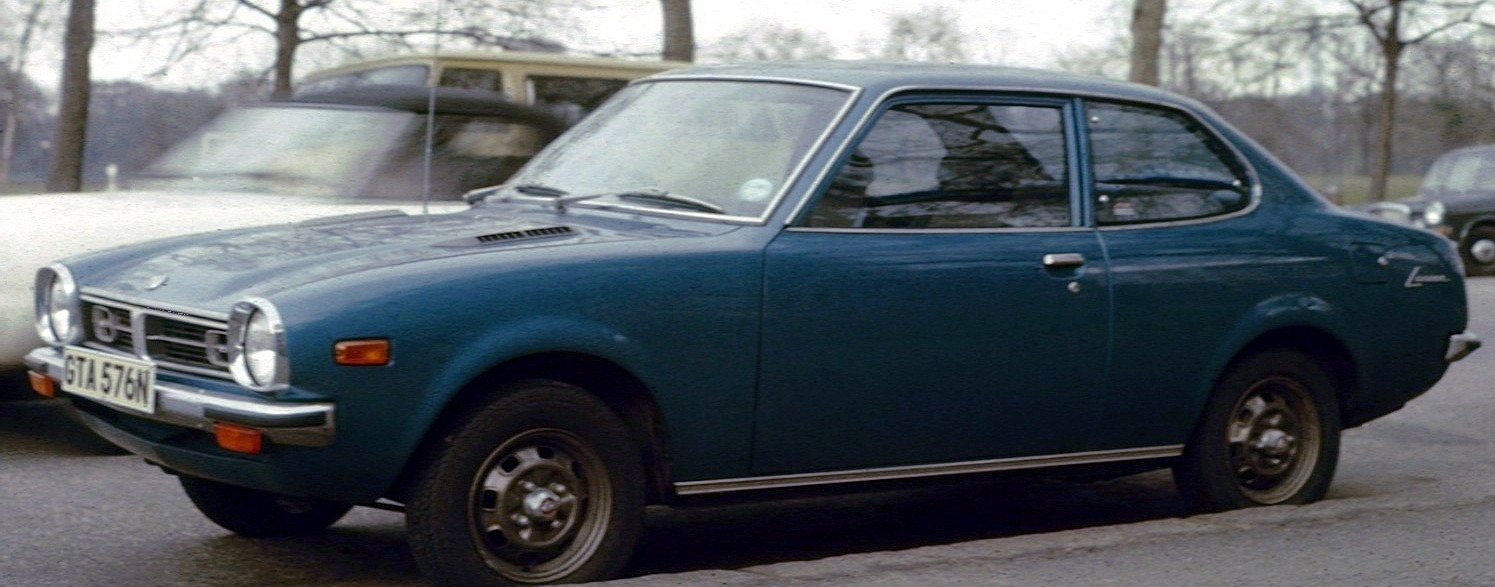

Overview
- Model code: A71A-A78A, A141A-A149V
- Also called: Chrysler Lancer; Chrysler Valiant Lancer; Colt Celeste; Colt Lancer; Dodge Arrow; Dodge Colt; Dodge Lancer; Mitsubishi Celeste; Plymouth Arrow; Plymouth Colt
- Production: 1973–1979 (sedan); 1973–1985 (van); 1975–1981 (Celeste)
- Designer: Shinichi Yamamura (design); Munechika Namba (engineering)

Body and chassis
- Body style: 2-door sedan 4-door sedan 5-door wagon (van); 3-door hatchback coupé (Celeste)
- Layout: FR layout

Powertrain
- Engine: 1,187 cc 4G42 I4; 1,238 cc 4G36 I4; 1,244 cc 4G11/G11B I4; 1,410 cc 4G12/G12B I4; 1,439 cc 4G33/G33B I4; 1,597 cc 4G32/G32B I4; 1,995 cc 4G52/G52B I4 (Celeste)

Dimensions
- Wheelbase: 2,340 mm (92.1 in) (sedan)
- Length: 3,960–4,105 mm (155.9–161.6 in)
- Width: 1,525–1,545 mm (60.0–60.8 in)
- Height: 1,360–1,385 mm (53.5–54.5 in)
- Curb weight: 765–900 kg (1,687–1,984 lb)

Chronology
- Predecessor: Mitsubishi Colt 1200
- Successor: Mitsubishi Lancer (second generation)

The Mitsubishi Lancer (A70) is the first generation version of Mitsubishi's long-running Lancer nameplate. When introduced in 1973, it filled the gap between the Minica kei car and the considerably larger Galant. It was a replacement for the Colt 1200, last sold in 1970. Although sedan production ended in 1979, vans continued on until 1985. This Lancer also formed the basis for the Lancer Celeste sports coupé of 1975 through to 1981. These Lancers were sold under a multitude of names in different markets.

== History ==
=== 1973–1976 ===
The Lancer A70 was launched in February 1973 in two- and four-door sedan form. It proved to be particularly successful in rallies, a claim Mitsubishi maintains to this day. The Lancer served to fill a gap in Mitsubishi's lineup in the small to lower-medium segment of the growing Japanese market. Twelve models were launched, ranging from a basic 1.2-litre sedan to a more powerful 1600 GSR model, successful in rallying.

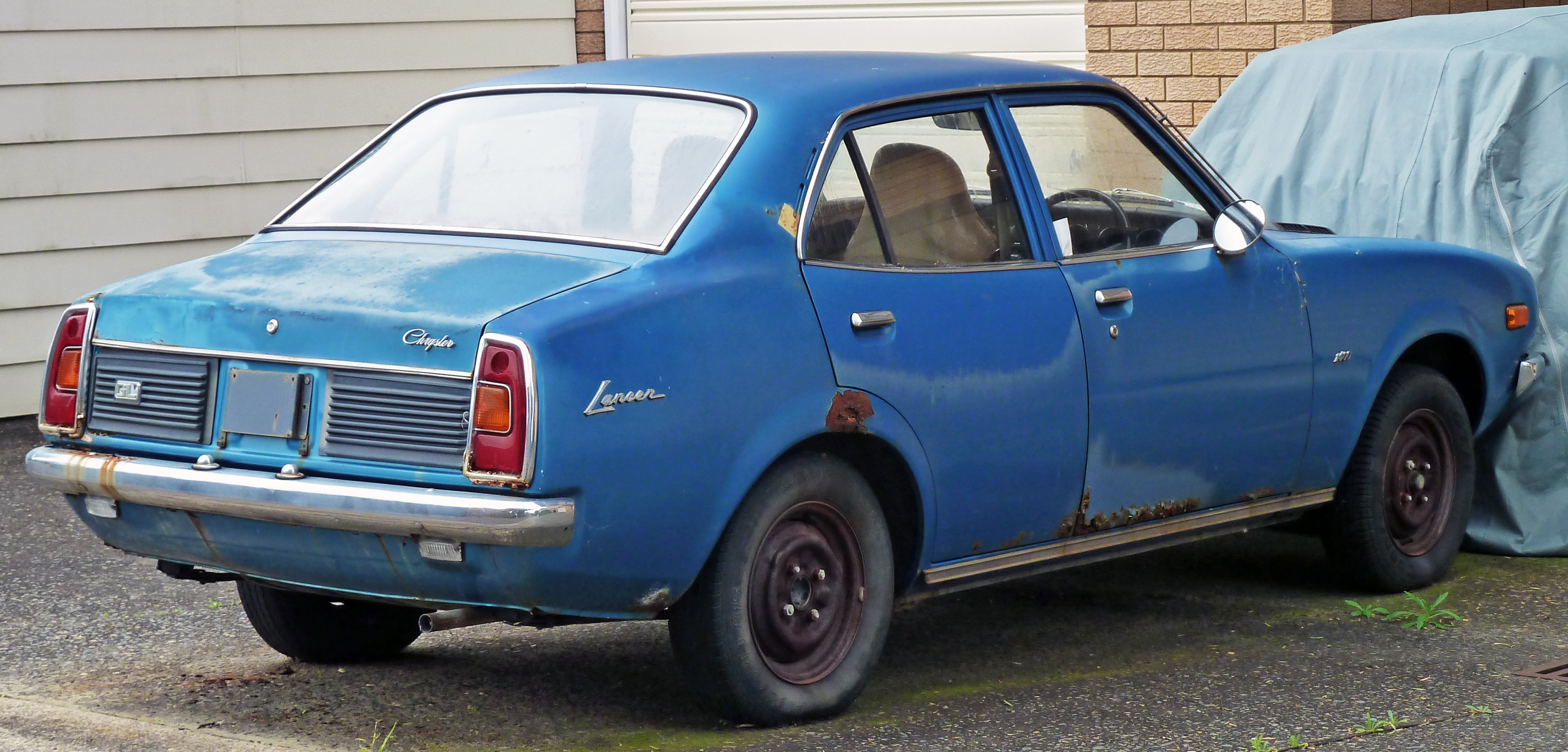
Chrysler Lancer (LA) GL sedan (Australia, A72A, pre-facelift)

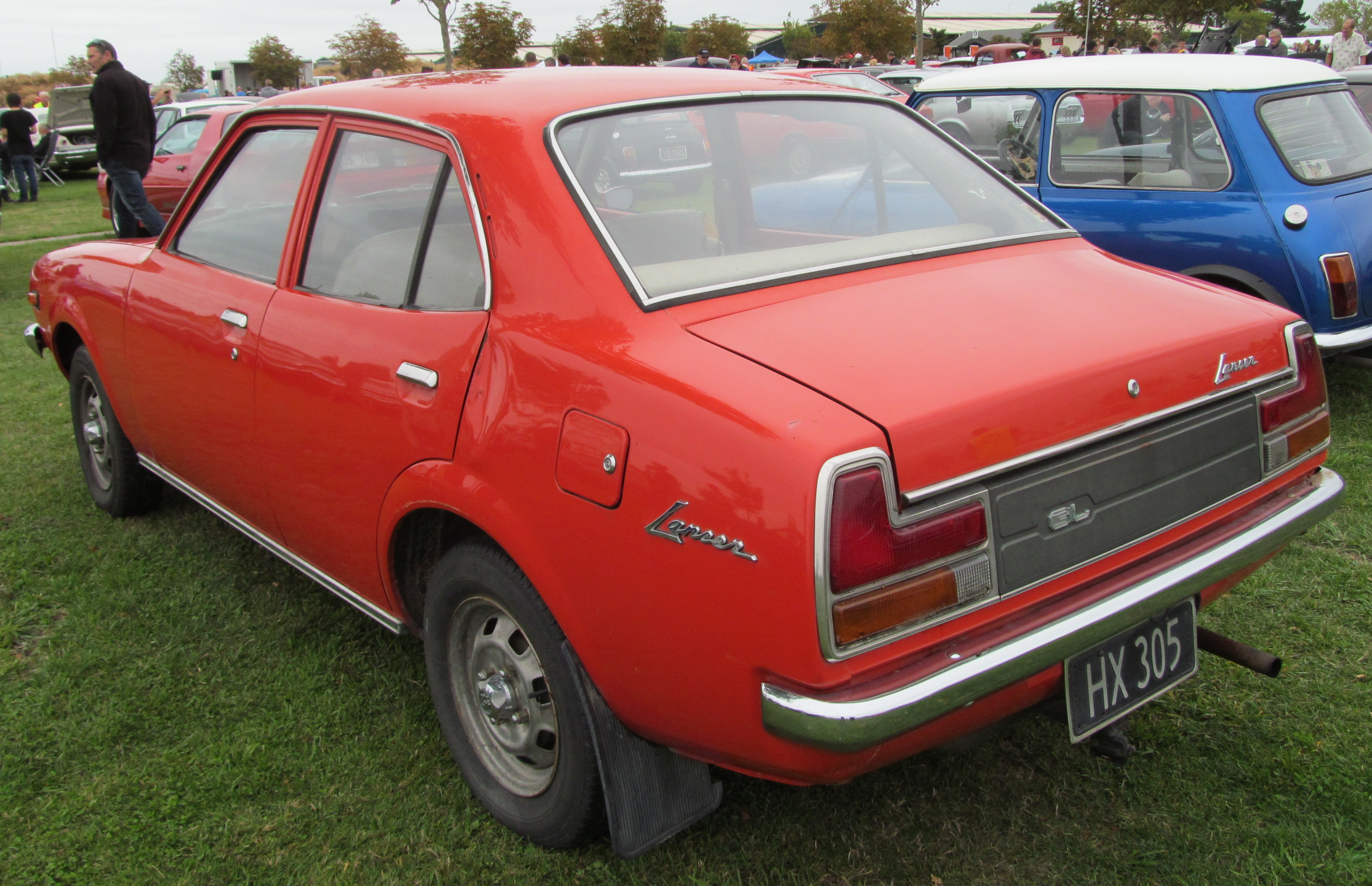
1976 Mitsubishi Lancer GL sedan (NZ)

There were three body styles (four if the Celeste liftback/coupé is included), two- and four-door sedans and a rarely seen five-door station wagon introduced in September 1973. In October 1975 the smallest engine was replaced by another 1.2-litre four, the 80 hp 4G36. In November, the entire engine lineup lost around eight–nine percent of its power, as a result of the stricter emissions standards for 1976. Reflecting a popular appearance during the 1970s, the Lancer adopted "coke bottle styling" on the sedan and wagon for this entire generation.

Originally, the Lancer received an OHV 1.2-litre Neptune 4G42, an OHC 1.4-litre Saturn 4G33 or the larger 1.6-litre 4G32. Power outputs were 70 PS (51 kW), 92 PS (68 kW), and 100 PS (74 kW) respectively for what was called A71, A72 and A73 models. The 1600 GSR, introduced in September, used two Mikuni-made twin-barrel Solex carburetors for 110 PS (81 kW) at 6,700 rpm.

This vehicle was sold as the Colt Lancer in the United Kingdom, where it went on sale in late 1974. This name was also used in Ireland and a few other European countries. In some Latin American countries, as for example, in El Salvador, the car initially was known as the Dodge Lancer. This reluctance to use the Mitsubishi brand in many export markets stemmed from a fear of buyer resistance amongst those who could still remember fighting Japanese pilots in Mitsubishi A6M Zeros.

In the Australian market, the first generation models were initially sold under the Chrysler Valiant Lancer name, with approximately 11,800 units sold between late 1974 and 1979. The original LA series was released in September 1974 in two levels of specification, a basic two-door EL and the four-door GL sedan which offered a higher level of equipment. Only one engine was offered, the 1,439 cc single cam, alloy-head four-cylinder engine rated at 92 hp (68.6 kW) at 6,300 rpm. This could be paired with either an all-synchromesh four-speed manual, or a three-speed automatic.

European market Lancers received the 1.2, 1.4 and 1.6-litre Saturn 80 engines, with claimed output of 55 PS (40 kW), 68 PS (50 kW), and 82 PS (60 kW) DIN (GSR). The 1.6-litre engine was reserved for the two-door version, while four-door sedans only received the 1.4. Top speeds were 150, 155, and 165 km/h.

=== 1976–1979 ===
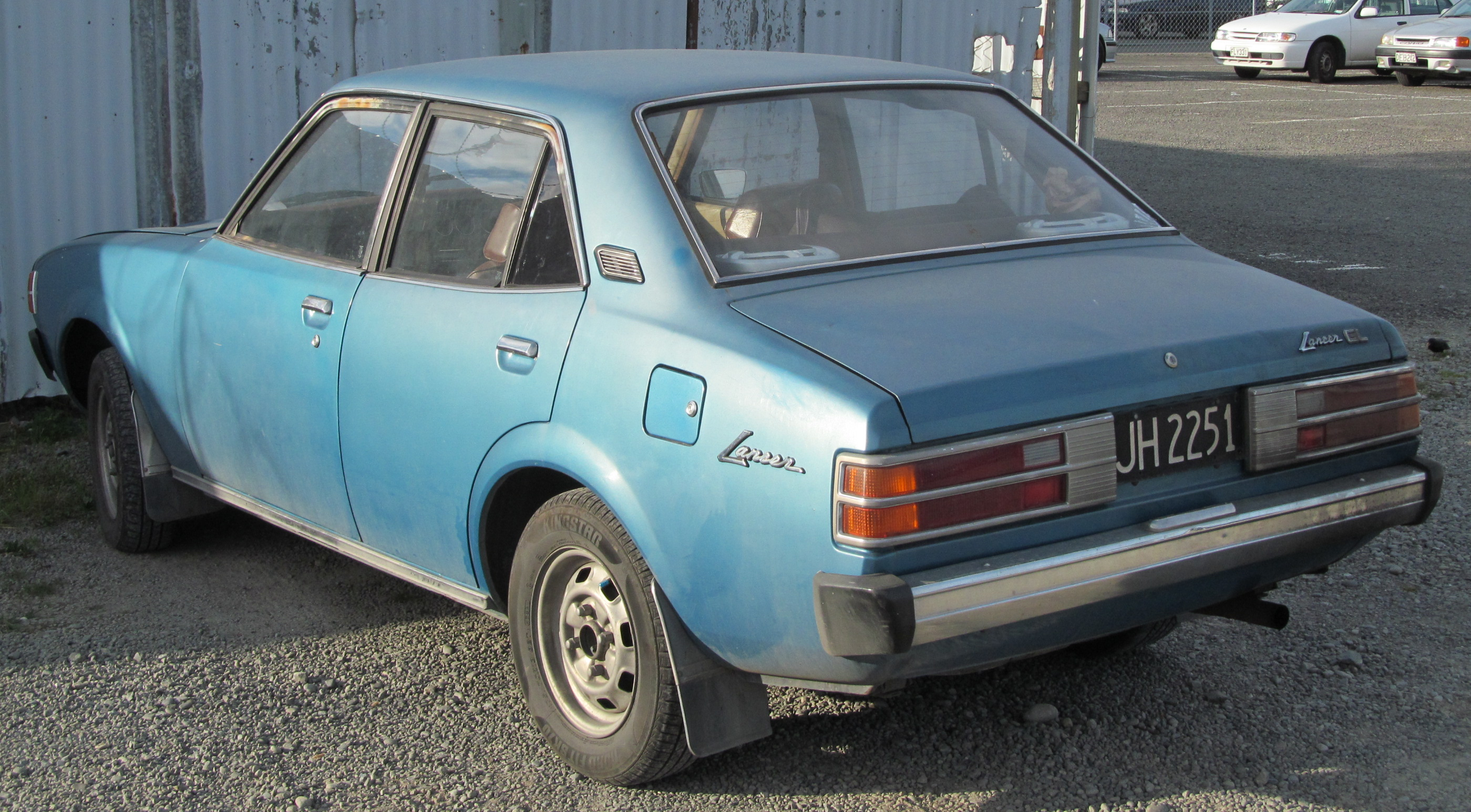
Mitsubishi Lancer GL (NZ; facelift)

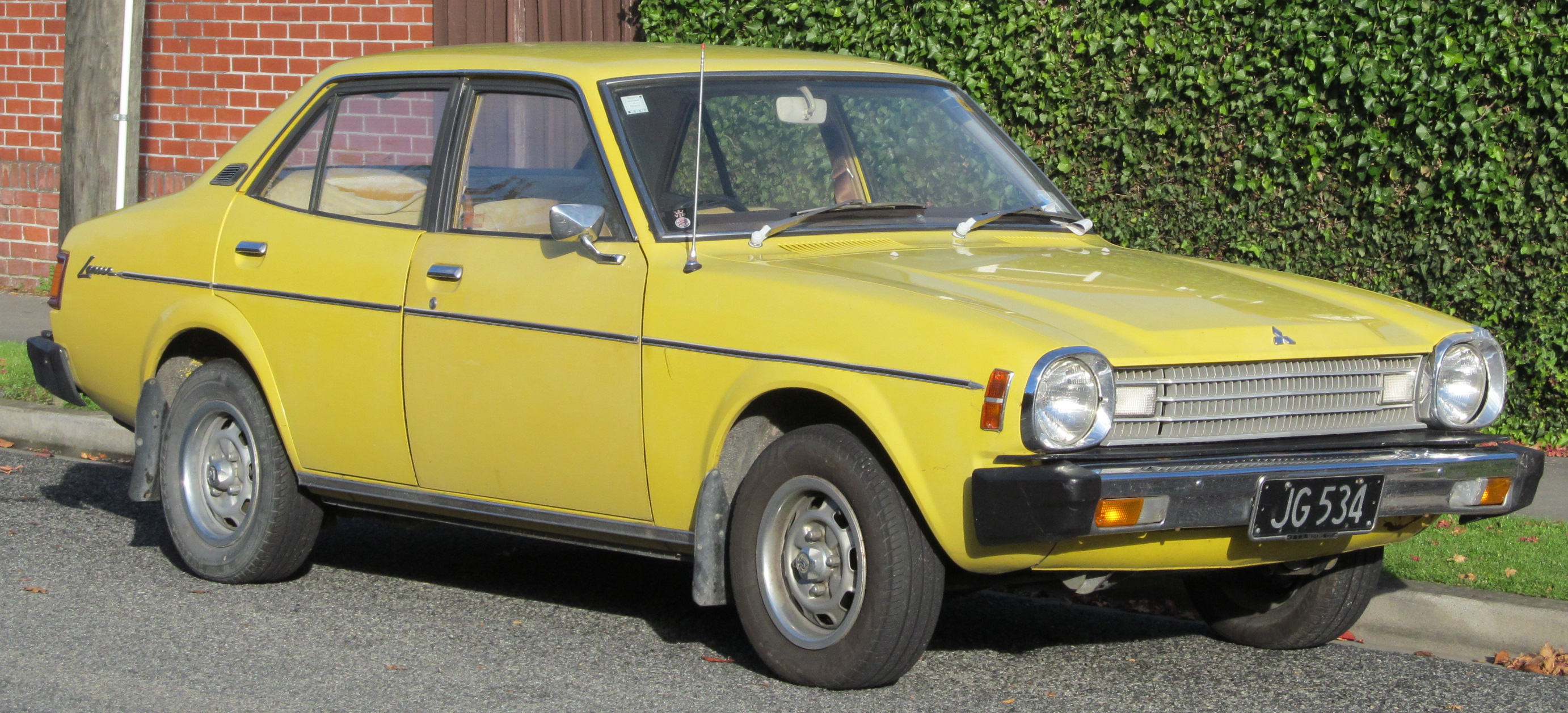
Mitsubishi Lancer sedan (NZ; facelift)

In November 1976 the Japanese market models received a facelift, losing the previous L-shaped/upright rear lamps in favor of wide rectangular units. Front indicators were enlarged and moved, and new bigger rubber bumpers were also added, and new grilles were introduced. The 1200 Standard was discontinued and the lower-end 1200 EL was replaced by the "value-for-money" 1200 Populaire, which was a low-cost model with some additional equipment such as side moldings and a model-specific grille. This generation gradually became the A140-series in Japan, reflecting the introduction of new engines. Since it kept the 4G32 engine, the GSR was referred to as an A73 until the very end in spite of having received all of the bodywork modifications.

As a response to the new emissions standards taking effect in 1978, the 1.2-litre Saturn engine was replaced by the new 70 PS (51 kW) Orion G11B (1,244 cc) in April 1977. This was the new lean-burning MCA-Jet engine, which had a tiny second inlet valve which created a swirl, allowing for the combustion of a much leaner fuel mixture. In spite of the added technology, the new engine was lighter, bringing the weight of the 1200 models down by 10 kg (22 lb). The MCA-Jet system was added to the existing Saturn 4G33 and 4G32 engines in June of the same year. Power for these (now G33B/G32B) was reduced to 82 PS (60 kW) and 86 PS (63 kW). Later in 1977, the entire Lancer range changed the front grille to the design which had already been used on the Populaire.

It was this series that emerged in the United States as the Dodge Colt for the 1977 model year (Plymouth Colt in Canada), taking over from a badge-engineered Mitsubishi Galant from the previous year. It was offered for one more model year before the Dodge Colt name was gradually transferred to the front wheel drive Mitsubishi Mirage. The very large safety bumpers used in the American market were added to certain models in the domestic range in March 1978 (GL Extra, GSL, GSR) as part of one last minor facelift. This facelift also introduced the larger 1.4-litre Orion engine (G12B), producing 80 PS (59 kW).

April 1977 saw the introduction of the facelift model in Australia, designated locally as the LB series. This was discontinued in May 1979, having lost most of its market share to the bigger, locally built Chrysler Sigma.

=== 1600 GSR ===
The high-performance Mitsubishi Lancer 1600 GSR sold as the Colt Lancer 1600 GSR in Europe, was developed by Mitsubishi Motors to further their aspirations in off-road racing, especially the Safari Rally of Kenya. Thanks to repeated triumphs in what was the most gruelling rally in the world, it earned the nickname "King of Cars" in Africa.

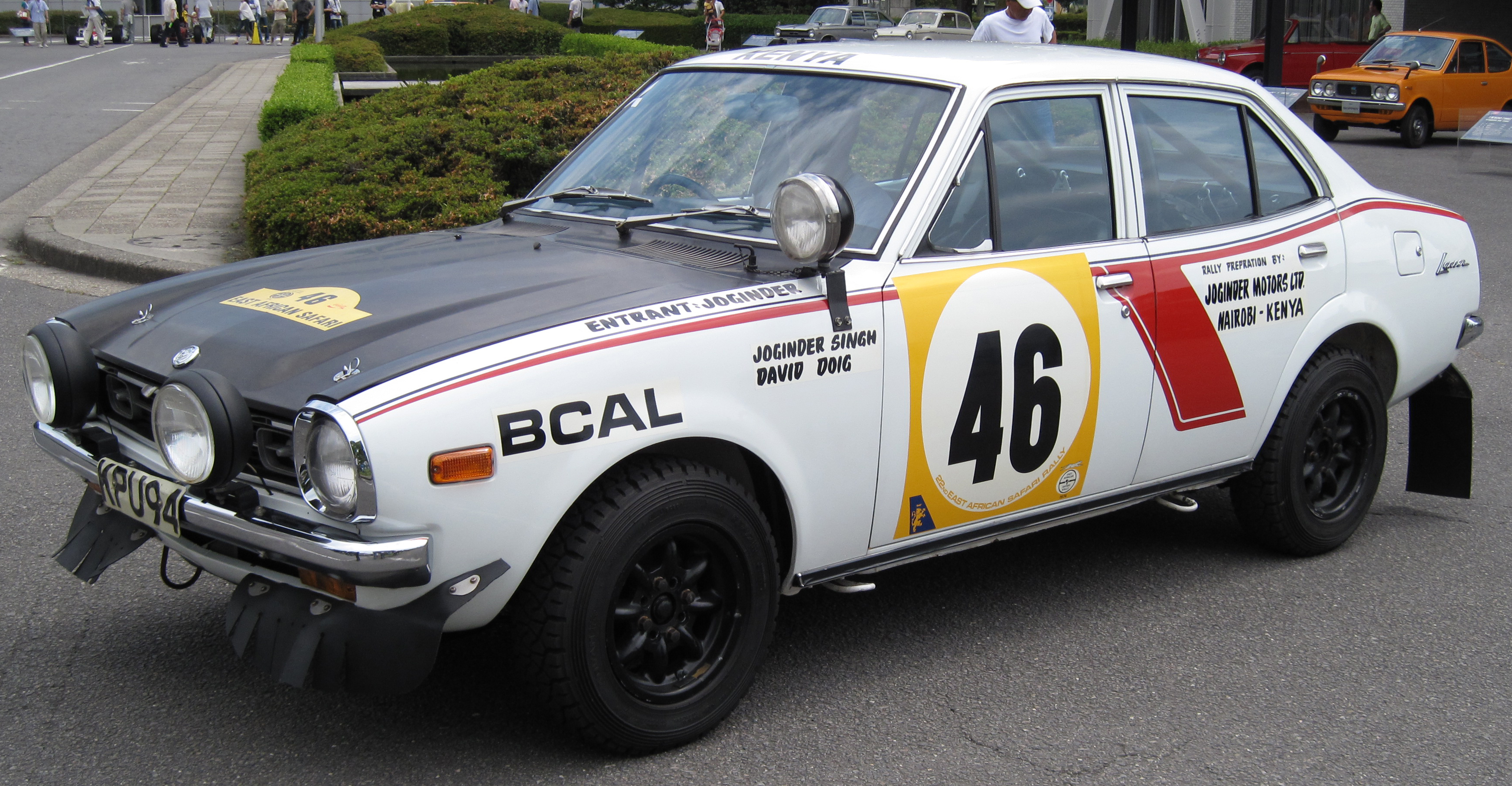
Mitsubishi Lancer 1600 GSR, Safari Rally winner 1974

In rally specs, the GSR produced 165 PS (121 kW) at 7800 rpm and 161 N⋅m (119 lb⋅ft) at 5500 rpm. Street versions originally developed 110 PS (81 kW), but this dropped to 100 PS (74 kW) when tighter emissions standards were introduced for 1976.

After sporadic successes with the Colt and Galant rally cars in previous years, Mitsubishi decided to develop a Lancer model specifically to tackle the notorious Safari Rally. Run over 6,000 km of arduous terrain under searing equatorial temperatures, the race was regarded as the toughest in the world, and typically only one car in five which set off from the start would manage to reach the finish line in Nairobi. Mitsubishi sanctioned official factory teams for the 1974–77 events, building for itself an enviable reputation for durability when only one of thirteen cars failed to finish in those four attempts. The high point was a clean sweep of the podium places in 1976.

The car had previously demonstrated similar qualities in 1973, with its debut in the Australian Southern Cross Rally being rewarded with a clean sweep of the top four places. Works driver Andrew Cowan would go on to dominate this race in the 1970s, winning five consecutive titles from 1972 to 1976. Cowan and Joginder Singh also scored a 1–2 finish for the Lancer GSR at the 1977 Rallye Bandama Côte d'Ivoire.

Even after production ended it remained a popular car with privateers into the 1980s. However, the decline of endurance rallying and the rise of the Group B class eventually signaled its demise.

Selected international results (factory entries only)
Southern Cross Rally		1977		1977	
1973		4th	Kenjiro Shinozuka / Garry Connelly (1st in class)	4th	Andrew Cowan / Paul White
1st	Andrew Cowan / John Bryson	4th	Kenjiro Shinozuka / Garry Connelly (1st in class)	5th	Joginder Singh / David Doig
2nd	Barry Ferguson / Wayne Gregson	Safari Rally		6th	Davinder Singh / Chris Bates
3rd	Doug Chivas / P. Meyer	1974		10th	Kenjiro Shinozuka / Bob Graham
4th	Joginder Singh / Garry Connelly	1st	Joginder Singh / David Doig	Rallye Bandama Côte d'Ivoire	
1974		1975		1977	
1st	Andrew Cowan / John Bryson	4th	Andrew Cowan / John Mitchell (1st in class)	1st	Andrew Cowan / Johnstone Syer
2nd	Joginder Singh / Garry Connelly	4th	Andrew Cowan / John Mitchell (1st in class)	2nd	Joginder Singh / Mike Doughty
1975		8th	Davinder Singh / Roger Barnard	1000 Lakes Rally	
1st	Andrew Cowan / Fred Gocentas	10th	Prem Choda / Pauru Choda	1977	
2nd	Barry Ferguson / L. Adcock	ret	(Joginder Singh / David Doig)	19th	Pertti Kärhä / Seppo Siitonen (1st in class)
5th	Kenjiro Shinozuka / Garry Connelly	1976		19th	Pertti Kärhä / Seppo Siitonen (1st in class)
1976		1st	Joginder Singh / David Doig	International Safari du Zaïre	
1st	Andrew Cowan / John Bryson	2nd	Robin Ulyate / Chris Bates	1979	
2nd	Barry Ferguson / N.Faulkner	3rd	Andrew Cowan / Johnstone Syer	1st	Jean-François Vincens / Félix Giallolacci
5th	Kenjiro Shinozuka / Garry Connelly	6th	Kenjiro Shinozuka / Bob Graham		

== Van/Wagon ==
As there was no station wagon version of the Lancer EX, the first generation Lancer Van (wagon) continued in production for the home and select export markets until February 1985, by which time the car was conspicuously outmoded. When the 1.2-litre pushrod was replaced in 1975, Vans for the domestic market retained the old Neptune engine for an extra year, and the 1238/1439 cc Saturn engines weren't replaced by Orions until March 1979. The smaller Orion engined version (1.2 L A141V) continued to be available in Greece and Kenya into the eighties. Wagon versions for export received updates on the same schedule as did export market sedans. The domestic market vans received yet another update in October 1981, again to clean emissions, meaning that a new set of chassis numbers were assigned. The home market vans were available in Standard (only 1200), EL, and GL trim levels. The Lancer Van was finally replaced by the new front-wheel drive Mirage/Lancer Wagon and Van in February 1985.

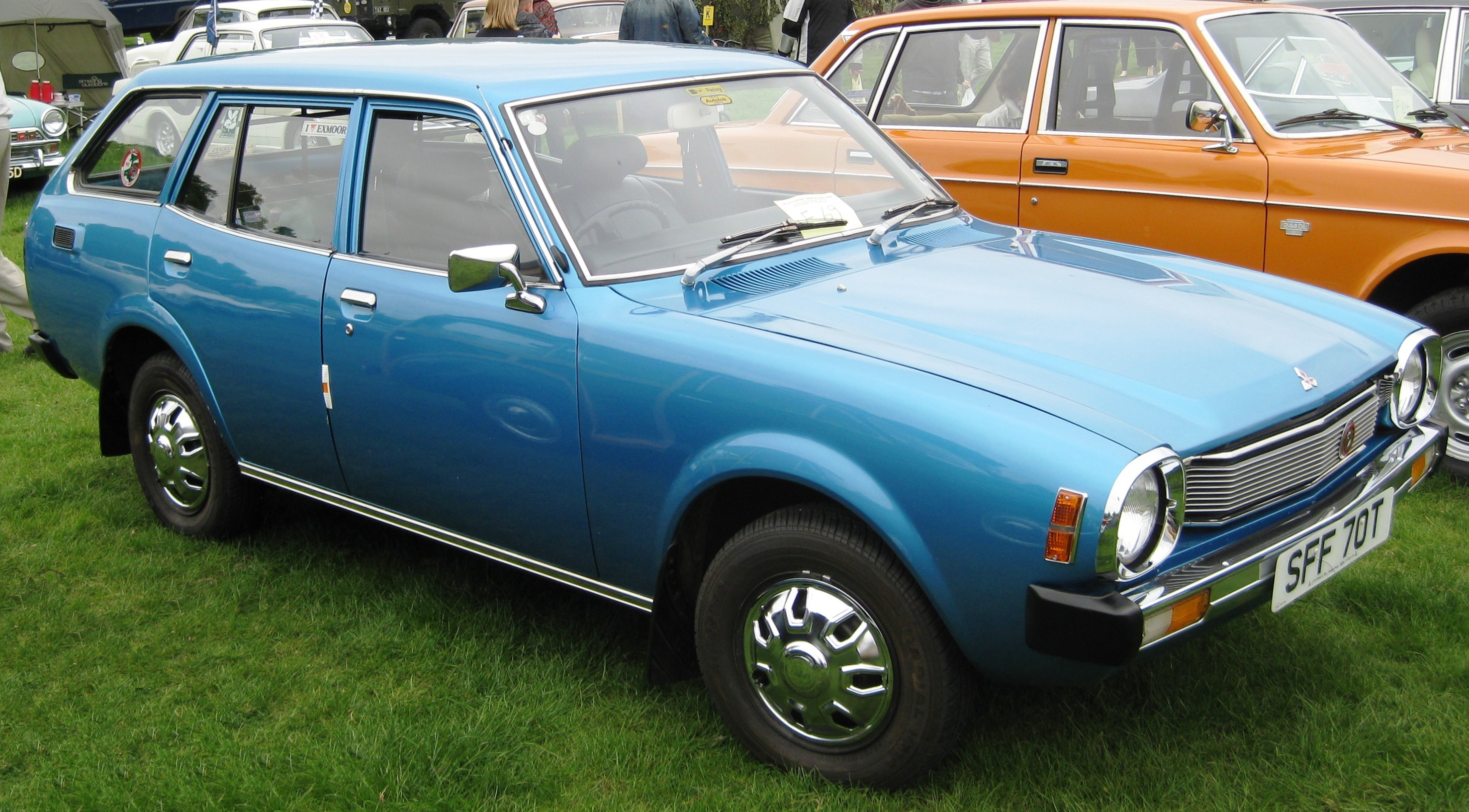
1979 Mitsubishi Lancer Estate (Van)

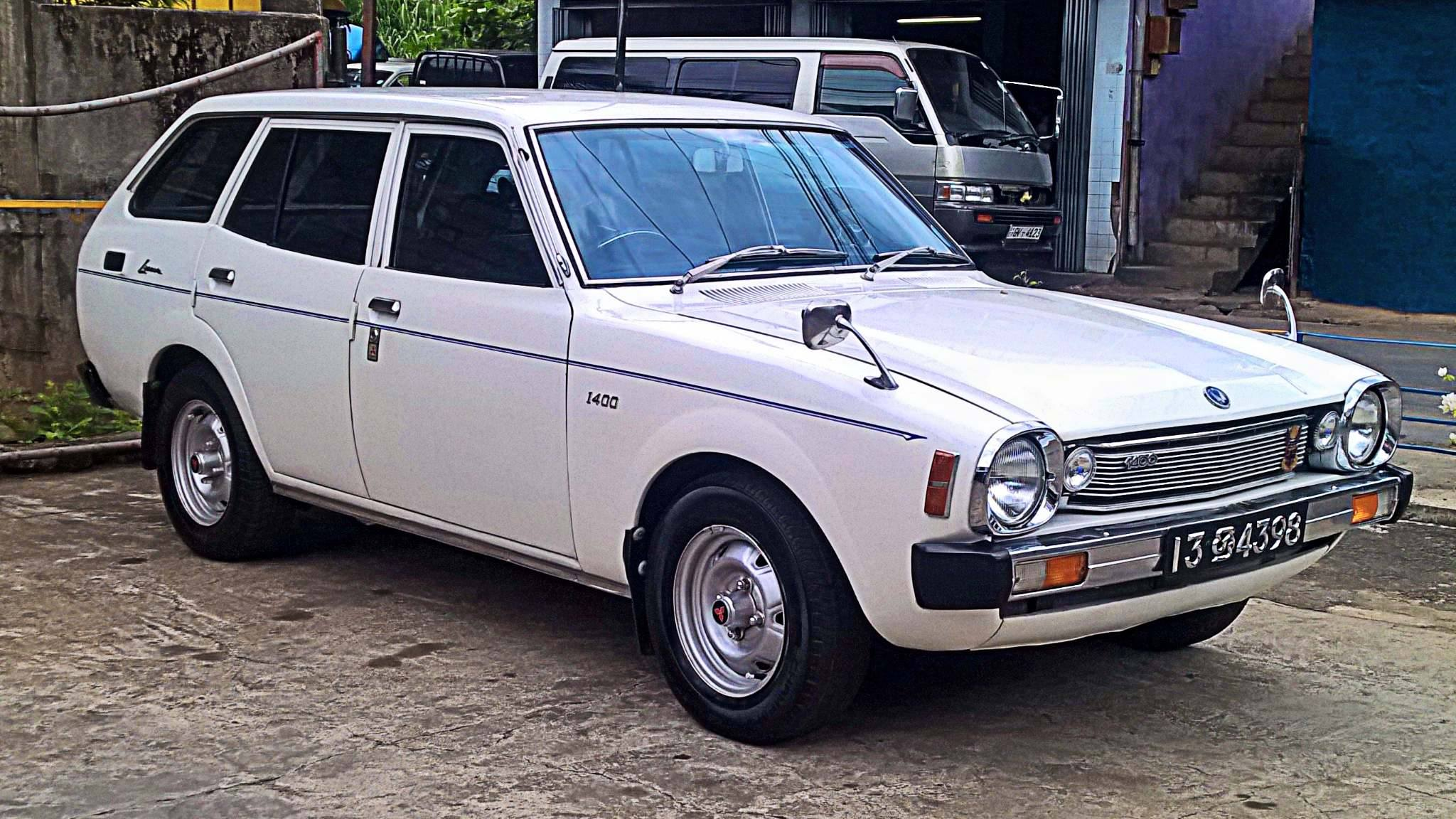
1983 Lancer Van/Wagon

== Celeste ==
In February 1975, the Lancer was complemented by a hatchback coupé called the Mitsubishi Lancer Celeste (A70-series). It succeeded the Galant FTO, which never did very well in the marketplace due to confusion with the Galant GTO and carrying too high a price. It was also called the Mitsubishi Celeste or Colt Celeste in some markets; and sold as the Chrysler Lancer Hatchback in Australia, the Dodge Lancer Celeste in El Salvador, the Plymouth Arrow in the United States, and the Dodge Arrow in Canada. Sitting on the same 2,340 mm wheelbase as the Lancer, length was up to 4,115 mm.

The Celeste was originally available with 1.4- and 1.6-litre options, a bigger 2.0-litre model was added later (1975 for export markets, but only as of 1979 for the Japanese domestic market). The 1979–80 Plymouth Fire Arrow came with an even larger (2,555 cc) four-cylinder, but strangled by American emissions regulations it only offered 105 hp (78 kW), no more than the two-litre engine had in markets outside of North America. Along with receiving a light facelift in July 1977, including new taillights and the cleaner (but lower powered) MCA-Jet engines, new model codes (A140-series) were introduced.

There was another facelift in April 1978; square headlights and bigger, less integrated bumpers heralded the coming eighties. Named accordingly, a top-of-the-line GT System 80 version had appeared in November 1977, including every possible extra and special black and gold paintwork. This was trumped by the 105 PS (77 kW) 2000 GT introduced in June 1979, with a version of the 2-litre Astron engine which had already used in export since October 1975. In early years, this engine produced a claimed 115 PS SAE (85 kW) in export trim. In period testing, however, power was measured at 60 PS (44 kW) at the wheels. Production of the Lancer Celeste ended in July 1981 and it was replaced by the front-wheel drive Cordia in early 1982.

Because of the Arrow's long, narrow, aerodynamic, lightweight design and rugged suspension, it was used extensively in various types of racing including SCCA road racing, rally and drag racing. The Arrow body design was used on pro stock and funny cars in the late 1970s by noteworthy racers such as Ray Godman, Don Prudhomme, Bob Glidden, and Raymond Beadle.

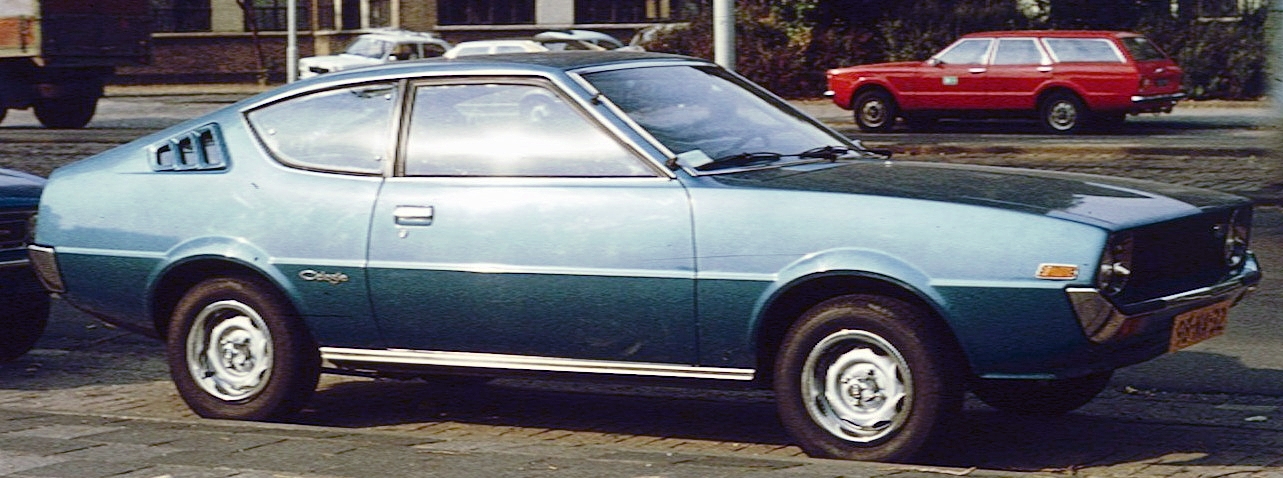
Pre-facelift Celeste (EU)

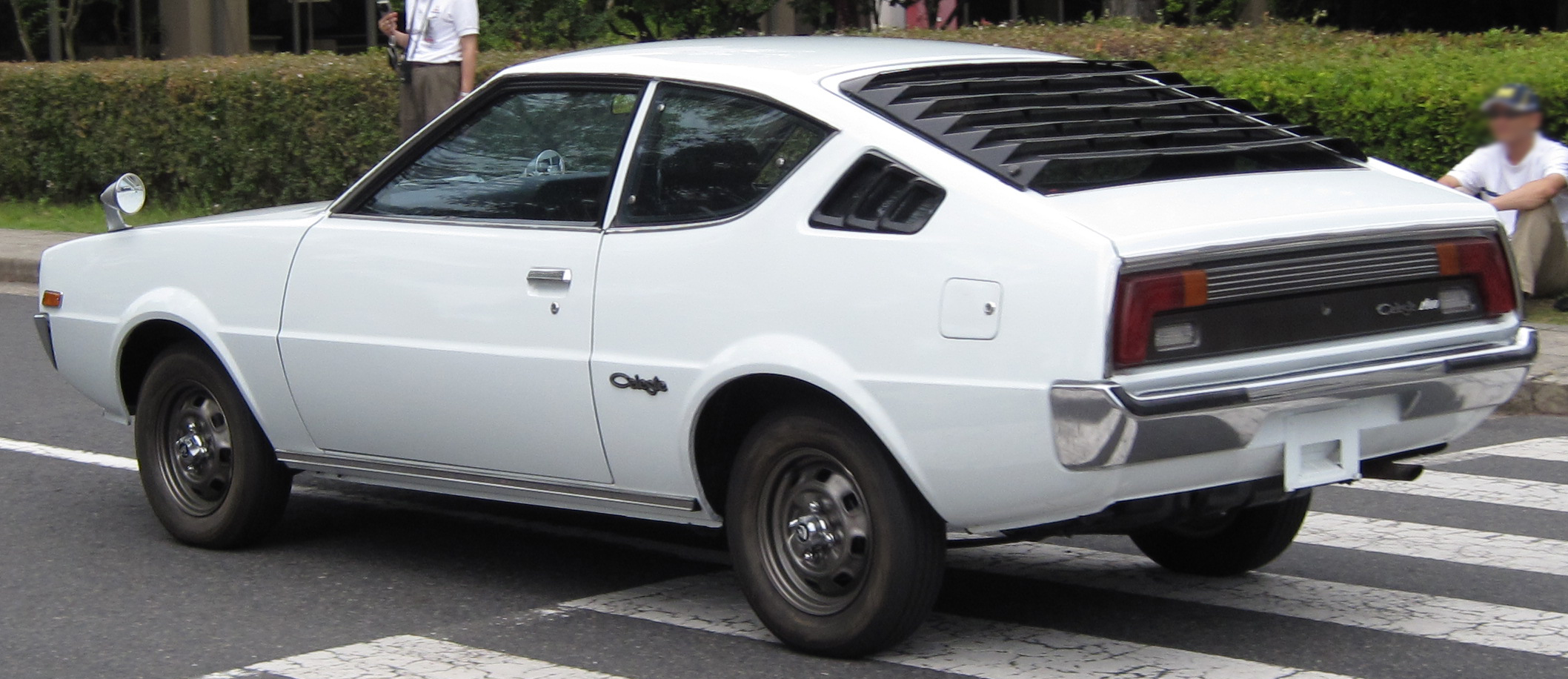
Early Lancer Celeste (1975–1977; rear)

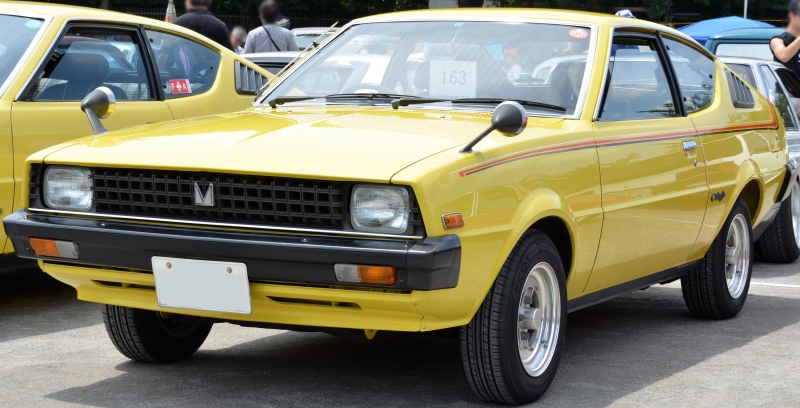
Facelift Lancer Celeste 1400 SR

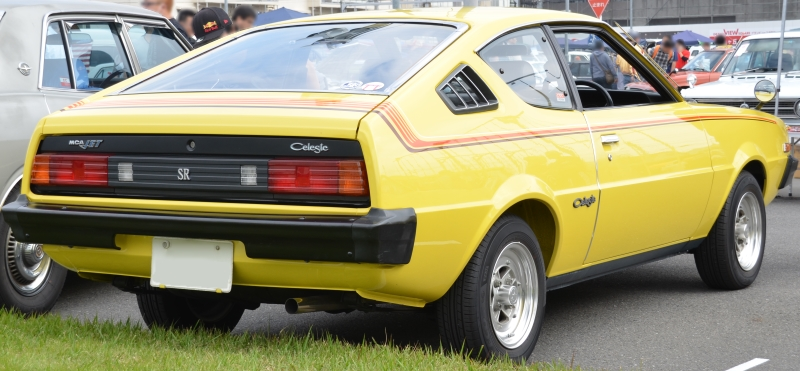
Rear view (facelift)

=== Australia ===
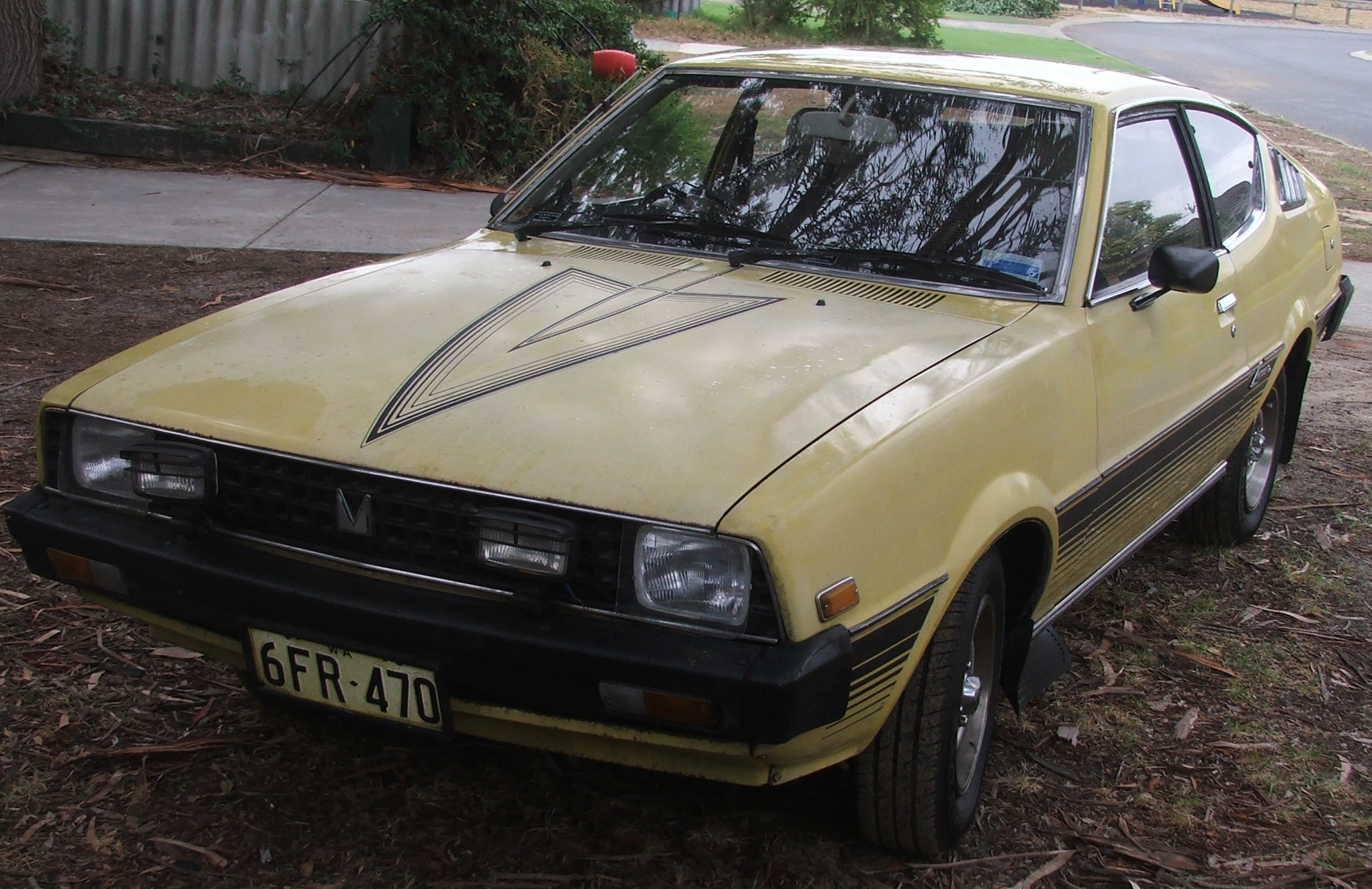
Facelifted 1980 Chrysler Lancer (LC; Australia)

The 1.6-litre Celeste was sold in Australia as the Chrysler Lancer Hatchback as part of the LB series from April 1977. It featured sports instrumentation and a 55-kilowatt (74 hp) version of the 4G32. The final LC iteration arrived in May 1979 with a rationalised model range which saw the sedan body variant deleted. Changes were as for 1979 Celestes, comprising rectangular headlamps, redesigned tail-lamps, black painted metal bumpers, a new five-speed manual transmission, and a belt driven SOHC version of the 4G32 engine called the G32B. During 1981, the Chrysler was rebranded Mitsubishi Lancer in the Australian market, lasting until August the same year.

Some of the Australian cars featured had "arrow" decals on the hood and stripes on the flanks, depending on the body colour. These were less flamboyant than on those sold in the North American market.

=== North America ===
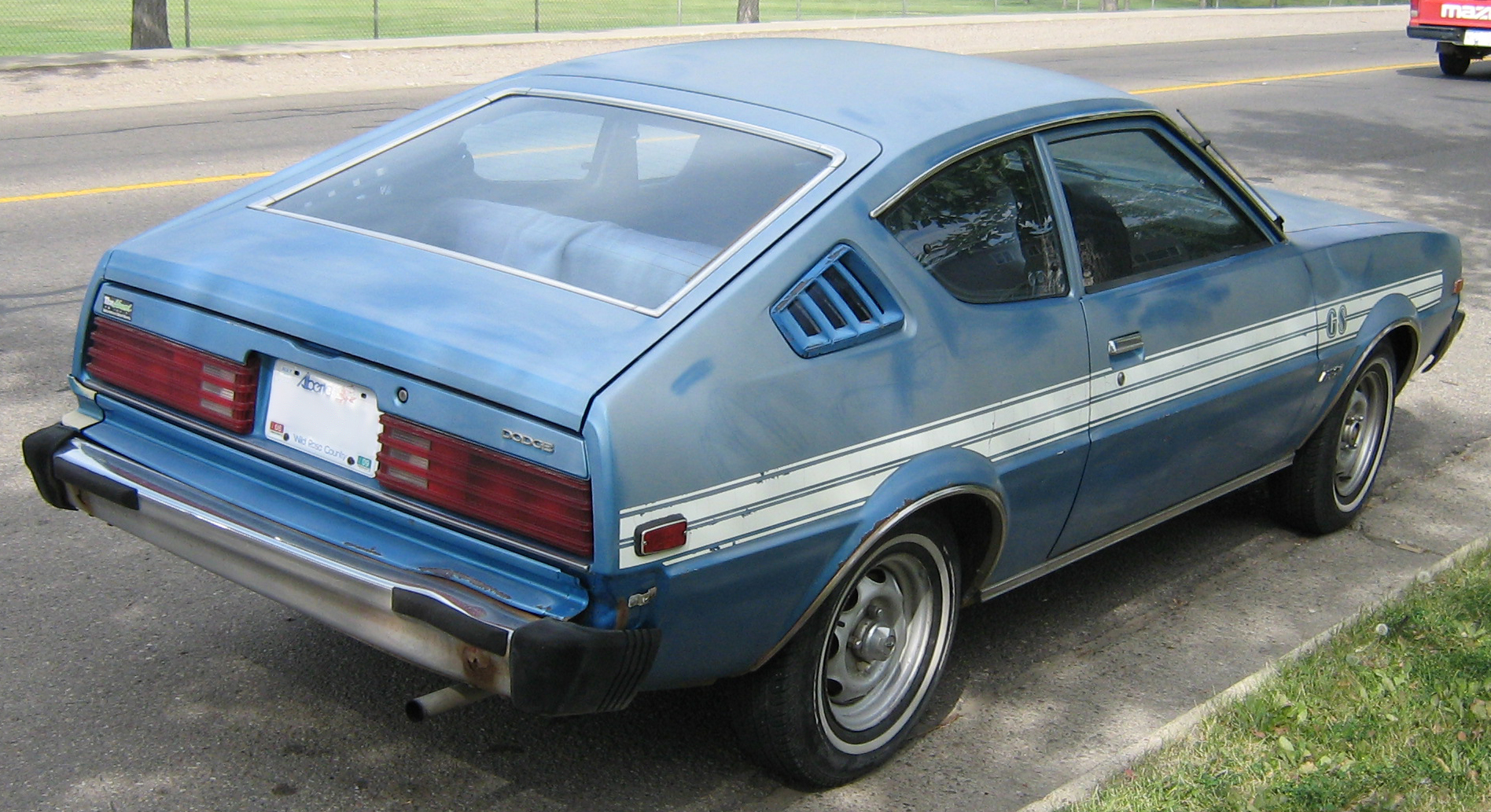
Dodge Arrow GS (Canada)

Chrysler introduced the Plymouth Arrow as a captive import of the Celeste in January 1976 as an extension to the Dodge Colt lineup. It was also known as the Dodge Arrow in Canada. It was also sold as the Dodge Celeste in Puerto Rico.

The Arrow was a rear-wheel drive car utilizing a solid rear axle and leaf springs in the rear, with MacPherson struts in the front. Transmission types included four and five-speed manual transmissions and a three-speed automatic. A 1.6 L inline-four engine was standard with an optional 2.0 L I4. It was produced in various trim levels including the 160, GS and GT. The first year Arrow is easily identified from later years because its quarter-window louvers have two slats in the centre, which were changed to three on all later years. The 1976 Arrow also came with a single windshield-wiper fluid nozzle on the hood, which was changed to dual nozzles for 1977 and remained that way for all later year Arrows.

Sporty exterior finishes were also offered, such as the Arrow Jet package, first offered in 1978. The Arrow Jet paint package was an eye-catching two-tone finish, typically in spit-fire orange and black. The entire car was spit-fire orange, but the entire bottom half of the car was covered in a solid flat black stripe with the words "Arrow Jet" stenciled out of the stripe on the doors so that the underlying body colour showed through. This colour combination of spit-fire orange and flat black seems to pay tribute to one of the design inspirations for the Plymouth Arrow, that being the Plymouth Barracuda. In 1971, the Barracuda was offered with a "billboard" decal option, which was a large, solid flat black decal that covered the entire back half of the car on both sides (often in a red and flat black colour combination).

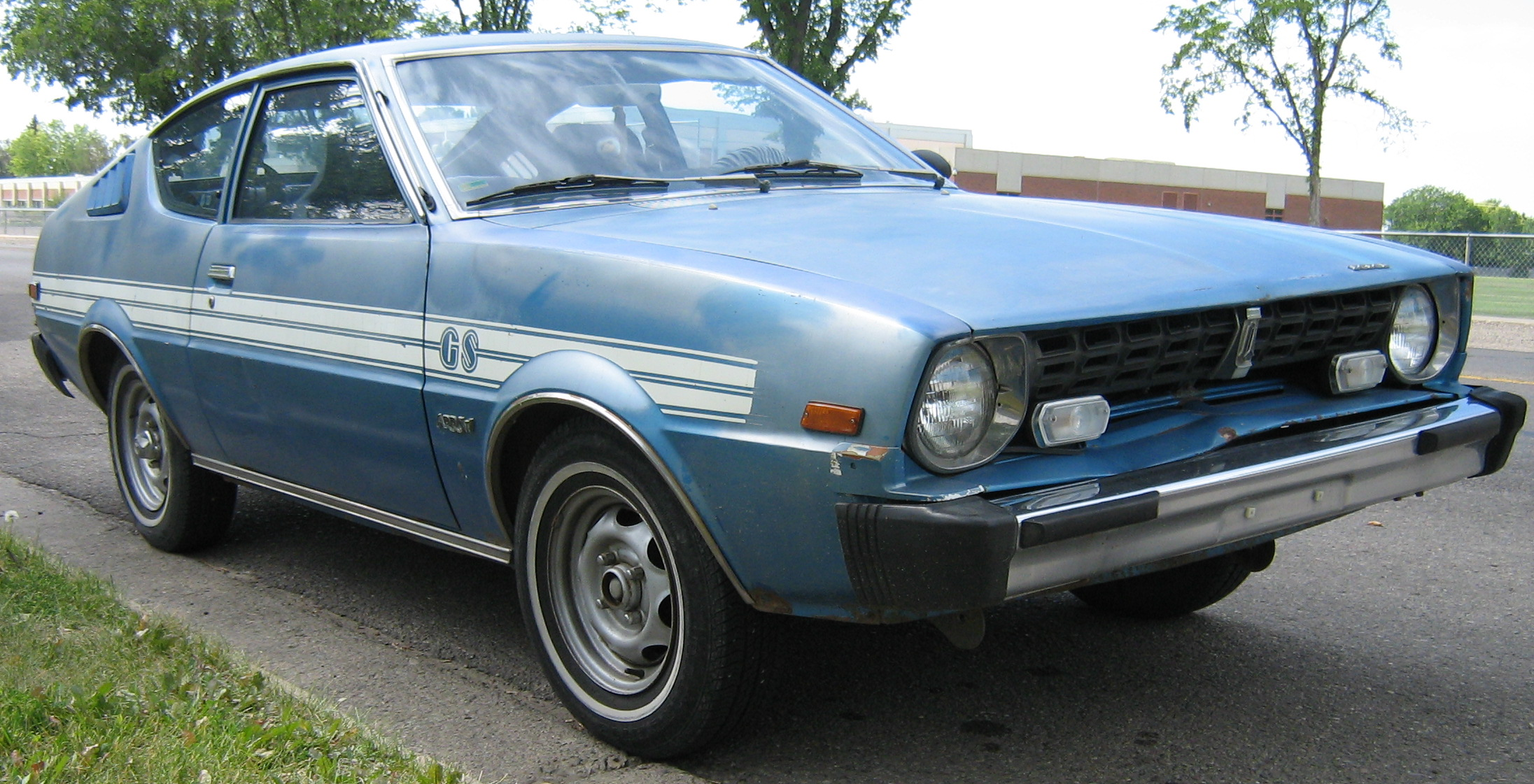
Dodge Arrow GS (Canada)

For 1979, the styling was freshened with the addition of flush bumpers, a more horizontal grille with rectangular headlights and hidden turn signals, chrome strips on the tail-lamps, and larger rear glass for the hatchback. Inside, the steering wheel previously found only in the Arrow GT was now standard while the heater provided more output. The rear axle was also extended 2.5 inches for better traction. A sporty variant called the Fire Arrow was first offered this year, which had special decals and a sporty interior, as well as a 2.6 L I4 engine and four-wheel disc brakes. The Fire Arrow had one of the best horsepower/weight ratios among U.S. production cars at the time because of its light weight. The 2.6 was also optional on the GS and GT models, and was only offered in conjunction with disc brakes all around. For 1979 and the succeeding year, the lineup began with the base Arrow (where the 2.0 L I4 engine was a new engine option), followed by the GS, GT, and the Fire Arrow on top.

The styling changes of the 1979 models carried over to 1980. The Fire Arrow however, was changed significantly. The 1980 Fire Arrow was now available with two new paint schemes: tan with a darker caramel-coloured hood, and blue with a dark blue hood. These coloured models were available with the smaller 1.6 engine and, like the base-model Arrows, had bumpers that were chrome instead of body colour. The white Fire Arrow was also changed, and now had a matte-black hood and cowl, with the black paint continuing along the tops of the fenders and doors and ending under the quarter-windows. Unlike the coloured versions, the white/black Fire Arrow had only one engine option, the 2.6 I4.

The Arrow coupe was discontinued after the 1980 model-year. A pickup truck version of the Arrow sharing very few parts with the coupe was released in 1979. Also available with the 2.6 L engine, the pickup was discontinued after 1982. The Arrow coupe's styling strongly influenced the design of the Plymouth Arrow Truck and its cousins; the Dodge D-50 and Mitsubishi Mighty Max pickups.

The Harry Nilsson song, Me and My Arrow (from The Point!) was used in television commercials in the United States promoting the Plymouth Arrow during the 1970s.

One of the more interesting options available for the Arrow was a small tent. When the rear seats were lowered and the tent was clipped over the open hatchback, it would allow the back of the car to be used for camping. This was also an option for the 1976 Holden Torana.

== Specifications and timeline ==
Data tables expand. Models listed are primarily as available in the Japanese domestic market, with notes on important export variants. For information on the Lancer-based Dodge Colt see that article.

First generation Lancer — data and history
Lancer sedan/coupé
Chassis code	Engine		Power			Dimensions (mm)			Top speed (km/h)	Transmission	Years (Japan)	Markets			Note
Chassis code	code	cc	hp	kW	at rpm	length	width	height	Top speed (km/h)	Transmission	Years (Japan)	J	EU	Aus	Note
A71A	4G42	1187	70	51	6000	3960	1525	1360	150	4MT	73.02-75.10	●	–	–	OHV
A72A	4G33	1439	92	68	6300	3960	1525	1360	165	4/5MT, 3AT	73.02-75.11	●	●	●	
A72A	4G33	1439	85	63	6000	3960; 3995	1525; 1535	1360; 1365		4/5MT, 3AT	75.11-77.06	●	●	●	MCA
A73A	4G32	1597	100	74	6300	3965	1525	1360		5MT	73.02-75.11	●	●	–	
A73A	4G32	1597	110	81	6700	3965	1525	1360		5MT	73.08-75.11	●	●	–	GSR
A73A	4G32	1597	92	68	6000	3965; 3995	1525; 1535	1360; 1365		5MT	75.11-77.06	●	–	–	MCA
A73A	4G32	1597	100	74	6700; 6300	3965; 3995; 4105	1525; 1535; 1545	1360; 1365		5MT	75.11-79.03	●	–	–	GSR MCA
A75A	4G36	1238	80	59	6300	3960	1525	1360		4/5MT	75.10-75.11	●	●	–	
A75A	4G36	1238	73	54	6000	3960; 3995	1525; 1535	1360; 1365		4/5MT	75.11-77.04	●	●	–	MCA
A141A	G11B	1244	70	51	5500	3995; 4105	1535; 1545	1365		4/5MT	77.04-79.03	●	–	–	MCA-Jet
A142A	G12B	1410	80	59	5500	3995; 4105	1535; 1545	1365		4/5MT, 3AT	78.04-79.03	●	–	–	MCA-Jet
A143A	G33B	1439	82	60	5400	3995	1535	1365		4/5MT, 3AT	77.06-78.04	●	–	–	MCA-Jet
A144A	G32B	1597	86	63	5000	3995; 4105	1535; 1545	1365		4/5MT	77.06-79.03	●	–	–	MCA-Jet
Lancer van (wagon)
Chassis code	Engine		Power			Dimensions (mm)			Top speed (km/h)	Transmission	Years (Japan)	Markets			Note
Chassis code	code	cc	hp	kW	at rpm	length	width	height	Top speed (km/h)	Transmission	Years (Japan)	J	EU	Aus	Note
A71V	4G42	1187	70	51	6000	3960	1525	1385		4MT	73.09-76.10	●	–	–	OHV
A72V	4G33	1439	92	68	6300	3960; 3995	1525; 1535	1385		4MT	73.09-77.10	●	●	–	
A72V	4G33	1439	85	63	6000	3995	1535	1385		4MT	77.10-79.03	●	●	–	MCA
A75V	4G36	1238	80	59	6300	3995	1535	1385		4MT	76.10-77.10	●	–	–	
A75V	4G36	1238	73	54	6000	3995	1535	1385		4MT	77.10-79.03	●	–	–	MCA
A141V	4G11	1244	73	54	5500	3995	1535	1385	145	4MT	79.03-81.10	●	●	–	MCA
A142V	4G12	1410	83	61	5500	3995	1535	1385	150	4MT	79.03-81.10	●	–	–	MCA
A148V	G11B	1244	70	51	5500	3995	1535	1385	145	4MT	81.10-85.02	●	–	–	MCA-Jet
A149V	G12B	1410	80	59	5500	3995	1535	1385	150	4MT	81.10-85.02	●	–	–	MCA-Jet
Lancer Celeste
Chassis code	Engine		Power			Dimensions (mm)			Top speed (km/h)	Transmission	Years (Japan)	Markets			Note
Chassis code	code	cc	hp	kW	at rpm	length	width	height	Top speed (km/h)	Transmission	Years (Japan)	J	EU	Aus	Note
A72A	4G33	1439	92	68	6300	4115	1610	1340		4/5MT, 3AT	75.03-75.11	●	–	–	
A72A	4G33	1439	85	63	6000	4115	1610	1340		4/5MT, 3AT	75.11-77.06	●	–	–	MCA
A73A	4G32	1597	100	74	6300	4115; 4230 (GT)	1610	1325; 1340		4/5MT	75.03-75.11	●	●	●	
A73A	4G32	1597	92	68	6000	4115; 4230 (GT)	1610	1325; 1340		4/5MT	75.11-77.06	●	●	●	MCA
A73A	4G32	1597	110	81	6700	4115; 4230 (GT)	1610	1325; 1340		5MT	75.03-75.11	●	●	●	GSR
A73A	4G32	1597	100	74	6700; 6300	4115; 4155	1610	1325; 1340		5MT	75.11-79.06	●	●	●	GSR MCA
A77A	G32A	1597	92	68	6000	4115	1610	1340		4MT	75.03-75.11	●	–	–	MCA 50年
A78A	4G52	1995	105	77	5700	4115; 4155	1610	1340		5MT, 3AT	75.10-81.07	–	●	‡	export only
A142	G12B	1410	80	59	5500	4155	1610	1325		4/5MT	78.04-81.07	●	–	–	MCA-Jet
A143	G33B	1439	82	60	5400	4115	1610	1340		4/5MT, 3AT	77.07-78.03	●	–	–	MCA-Jet
A144	G32B	1597	86	63	5000	4115; 4155	1610; 1620 (GT)	1340; 1325		5MT, 3AT	77.07-81.07	●	–	–	MCA-Jet
A146	G52B	1995	105	77	5400	4155	1620	1345		5MT	79.06-81.07	●	–	–	MCA-Jet
‡: only in New Zealand

Mitsubishi Lancer timeline (first generation)
	1973	1974	1975	1976	1977	1978	1979	1980
Lancer sedan/coupé
1200		A71		(80hp) A75 (73hp)		A141		
1400		A72 (92hp)		(85hp)		A143	A142	
1600		A73 (100hp)		(92hp)		A144		
1600 GSR		(110hp)		A73 (100hp)				
Lancer van/wagon (1981.11-1985.02: A148V/A149V)
1200		A71V			(80hp)	A75V (73hp)		A141V
1400		A72V (92hp)				(85hp)		A142V
Lancer Celeste			facelift→				(until 1981.07)	
1400			(92hp)	A72 (85hp)		A143	A142	
1600			(100hp)	A73 (92hp)			A144	
1600			A77	←(MCA 50年, G32A engine)				
1600 GSR			(110hp)	A73 (100hp)				
2000				A78			(export)	
2000								A146
2600	("Plymouth Fire Arrow", US only)						A147	
