= Mitsubishi FTO =

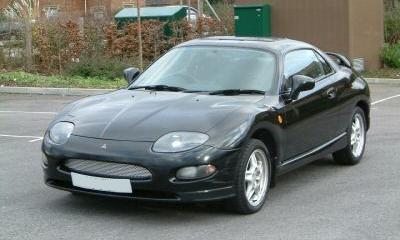
- 1994 FTO GPX (pre-facelift) in "Pyrenées Black"

Overview
- Manufacturer: Mitsubishi Motors
- Model code: DE
- Production: 1994–2000
- Assembly: Japan: Okazaki, Aichi (Nagoya Plant)

Body and chassis
- Class: Sport compact
- Body style: 2-door coupe
- Layout: Front-engine, front-wheel-drive
- Related: Mitsubishi Galant (seventh generation); Mitsubishi Lancer/Mirage (1991-2003); Proton Putra

Powertrain
- Engine: 1.8 L 4G93 SOHC 16V I4; 2.0 L 6A12 DOHC 24V V6; 2.0 L 6A12 DOHC 24V MIVEC V6
- Transmission: 5-speed manual 4-speed INVECS II (F4A4/W4A4) automatic (1994–97); 5-speed Jatco F5A5 automatic (1997–2000)

Dimensions
- Wheelbase: 2,500 mm (98.4 in)
- Length: 4,365 mm (171.9 in)
- Width: 1,735 mm (68.3 in)
- Height: 1,300 mm (51.2 in)
- Curb weight: 1,100–1,210 kg (2,425–2,668 lb)

The Mitsubishi FTO is a front-engined, front-wheel drive sport compact car produced by Mitsubishi Motors between 1994 and 2000. Originally planned exclusively for the Japanese domestic market, its popularity as a grey market import to the United Kingdom, Ireland, Hong Kong, Singapore, Malaysia, Australia and New Zealand led to eventual limited distribution through Mitsubishi's official dealers in those regions at the tail-end of production. Upon its debut it won the Car of the Year Japan award for 1994–1995, commemorated by a Limited Edition of the FTO GPX model.

FTO stands for "Fresh Touring Origination". The name recalls the Galant FTO coupé of 1971, one of the company's first sports cars.

== Backstory: The Galant FTO (January 1971-1975) ==
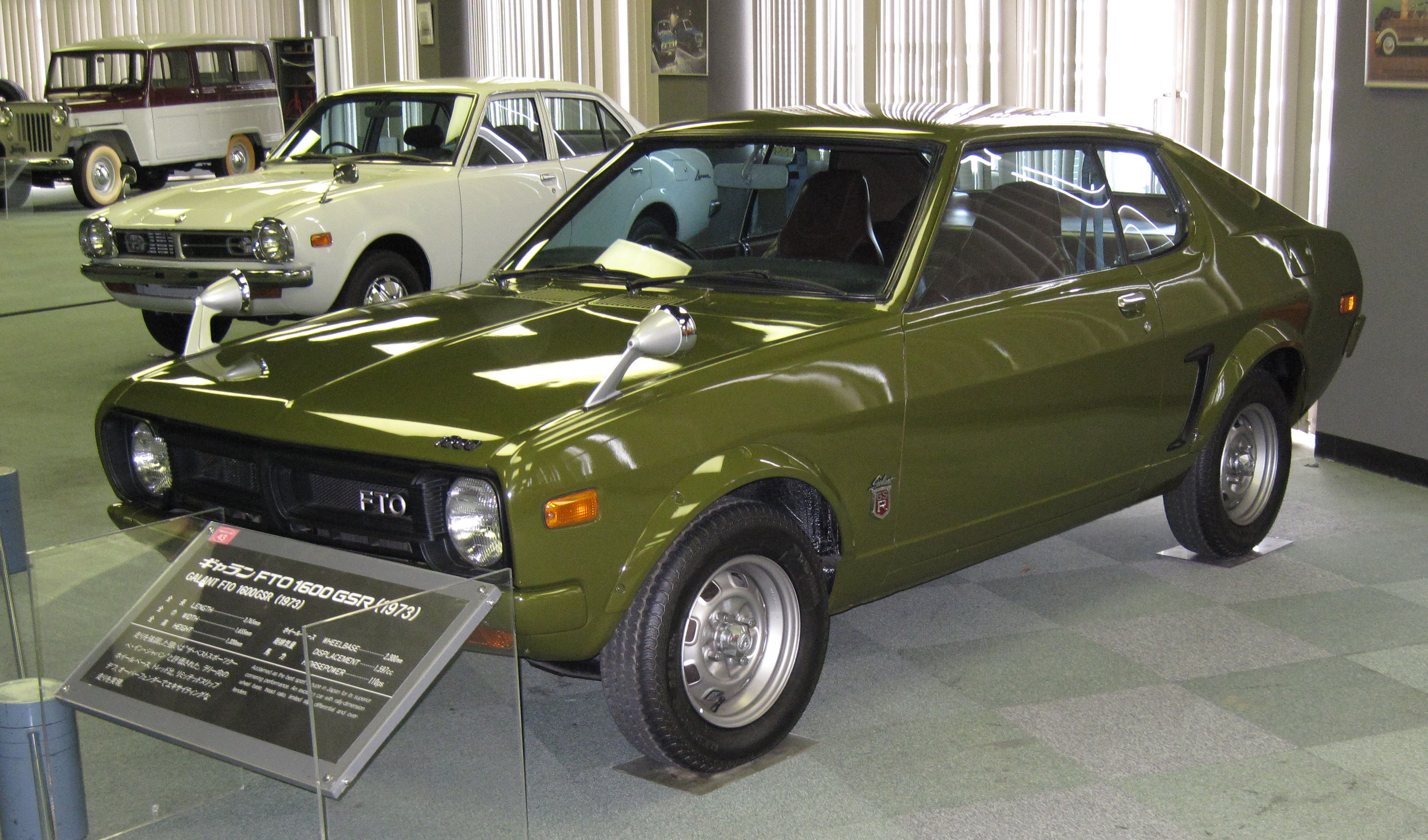
Mitsubishi Galant Coupé FTO

Prior to the arrival of the 1994 front-wheel drive FTO, which inherited the "FTO" tag, was the Mitsubishi Galant Coupé FTO. A rear-wheel-drive coupe produced by Japanese automaker Mitsubishi Motors from November 1971 to March 1975.[1] "FTO" was meant to stand for Fresco Turismo Omologato, in a fine example of Japanese Italian (or "Fresh Touring Homologated" in English). This compact Coupé FTO can effectively be seen as a replacement for the earlier Mitsubishi Colt 11-F Super Sports.

The Galant FTO was first introduced with an 86 or 95 PS (63 or 70 kW) 1378 cc 4G41 "Neptune" engine, until it was replaced via a redesign in February 1973 by a brace of 1597 cc 4G32 "Saturn" power plants - offering either 100 PS (74 kW), or 110 PS (81 kW), depending on the state of tune. There was also a 1439 cc Saturn engine, offering 92 PS (68 kW). In October 1973 there was a minor facelift and the lineup was restricted to four versions, with the EL, the GS and the four-speed SL versions cancelled. Production gradually came to an end in August 1975, after the introduction in March that year of the more staid Lancer Celeste.

== The New FTO Models ==
In 1994, a whole new FTO coupé concept was created. The only body style was a 2-door coupé, and all FTOs were front wheel drive. Either an inline-four or a transversely mounted V6 engine was available, mated to either a five-speed manual or the INVECS-II automatic transmission. Earlier (pre-facelift) auto models had a four-speed version, whilst most facelift [1997-2000] auto versions had a five-speed. The most recognizable exterior styling change during 1997 was, in simple terms, to the front bumper - which went from two air intakes to a single deeper intake, restyled front lip and indicator/fog lighting arrangement. On the pre-facelift models there exists a minor difference in the lower intake - on some earlier models there are two blanking plates on either side, thus reducing the size of the aperture. (These can be seen, either side of the number plate, in the image of the yellow GPX Limited Edition below).

By 2000, in the MMC Company Report, the now phased out FTO was simply described as "the little brother of the GTO, this sports coupe gives full expression to MMC's fun-to-drive philosophy with well-balanced proportions wrapped in dynamic and aggressive styling ..." Regarding the FTO acronym, the "Series Name Derivations" section of the Report describes the model as "FTO - Fresh Touring Origination: a touring model overflowing with freshness, youthfulness and originality".

=== October 1994–February 1997 (Pre-Facelift) ===
The inline-engined GS was the base model in the FTO range, with 14-inch wheels and automatic climate control. The rear spoiler was only an Option to the Original Equipment on both the GS and the GR. The larger-engined V6 GR also had auto-air conditioning and 15-inch wheels. Completing the range was the V6 MIVEC-engined GPX with 16-inch alloy wheels, sporting a rear spoiler and side air dams as standard. All three of these models gained various refinements prior to the introduction of the facelift versions and many models were purchased fitted with a number of original options that were available, such as ABS, traction control and a passenger air bag.

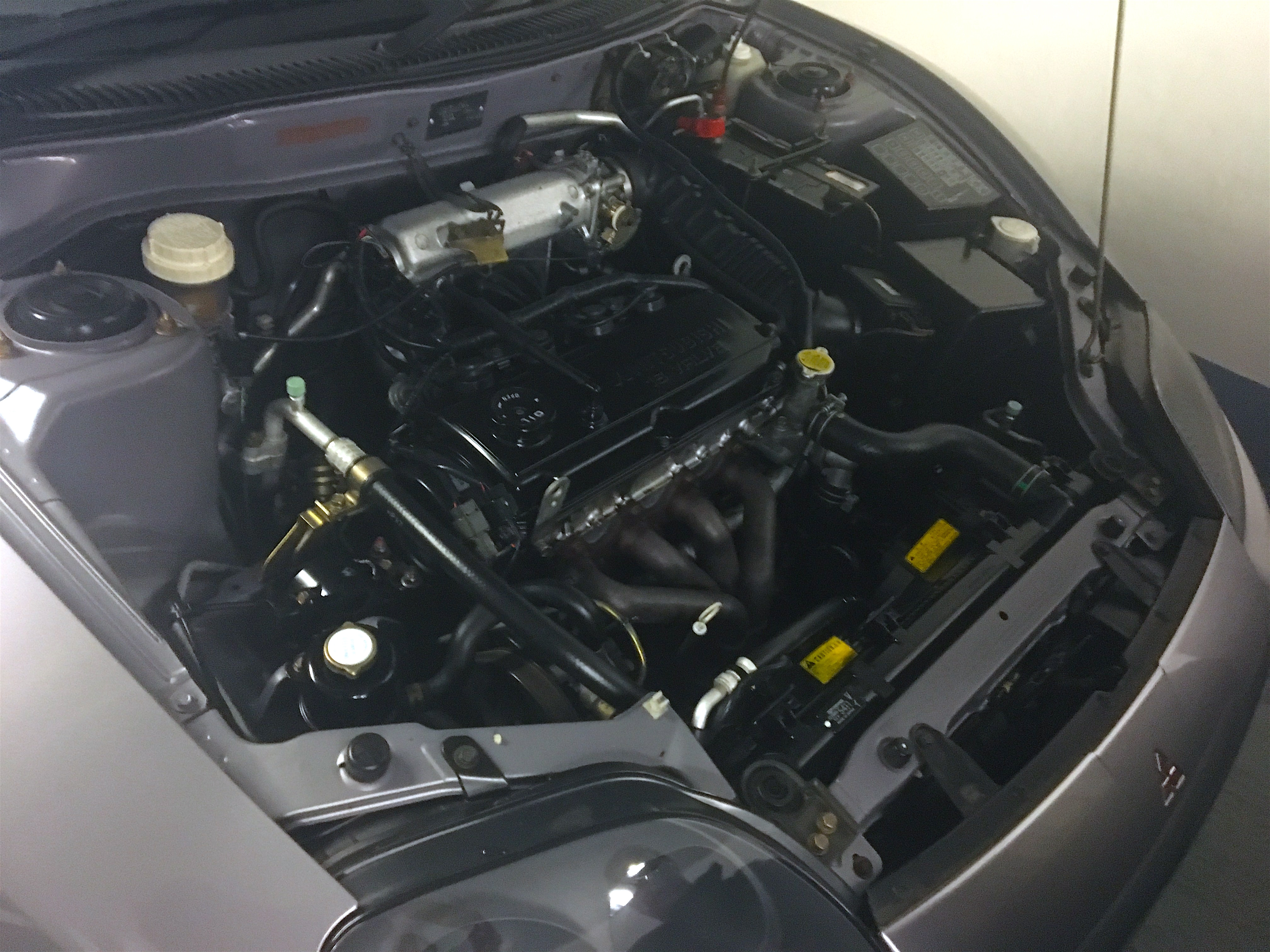
Mitsubishi Preface Steel Silver FTO GS Inline-4 engine bay

Prior to the introduction of the facelift models a Mivec GP model was introduced in 1996, together with a later "semi-race spec" Nakaya-Tune dealer package. The "GP Special" (Denoted by the suffix '2' to the initial GP Model Code), with 5-speed manual or 4-speed automatic, was also promoted by dealership as a GP version R introduction, although yet to gain the later GPvR body styling details, such as Facelift front and Aero Spoiler.

The first appearance of the Mitsubishi-designed INVECS-II automatic "tiptronic-style" transmission, based upon similar Porsche technology, was at the launch of this FTO model range. The auto models are, therefore, sometimes referred to as "Tip" or "Tiptronic" FTOs. Driven manually, the box "learns" the driver's style for when motoring in auto mode. The four-speed and five-speed automatic gearboxes use different gear ratios and top speeds differ accordingly.

Model name	Model code	Engine	Peak power
GS	DE2A HNUE (5-sp. M/T); DE2A HRUE (4-sp. A/T)	1834 cc SOHC 16 valve I4	125 PS (92 kW; 123 hp) at 6000 rpm
GR	DE3A HNHM (5-sp. M/T); DE3A HRHM (4-sp. A/T)	1998 cc DOHC 24 valve V6	170 PS (125 kW; 168 hp) at 7000 rpm
GR Limited Edition (1995)	DE3A HNHM3 (5-sp. M/T); DE3A HRHM3 (4-sp. A/T)	1998 cc DOHC 24 valve V6	170 PS (125 kW; 168 hp) at 7000 rpm
GR Sports Package	DE3A HNHM4 (5-sp. M/T); DE3A HRHM4 (4-sp. A/T)	1998 cc DOHC 24 valve V6	170 PS (125 kW; 168 hp) at 7000 rpm
GPX	DE3A HNGH (5-sp. M/T); DE3A HRGH (4-sp. A/T)	1998 cc DOHC MIVEC 24 valve V6	200 PS (147 kW; 197 hp) at 7500 rpm
GPX Limited Edition "COTY" (1995)	DE3A HNGH2 (5-sp. M/T); DE3A HRGH2 (4-sp. A/T)	1998 cc DOHC MIVEC 24 valve V6	200 PS (147 kW; 197 hp) at 7500 rpm
GP (Feb 1996)	DE3A HNFH (5-sp. M/T); DE3A HRFH (4-sp. A/T)	1998 cc DOHC MIVEC 24 valve V6	200 PS (147 kW; 197 hp) at 7500 rpm
GP Special (1996–97)	DE3A HNFH2 (5-sp. M/T); DE3A HRFH2 (4-sp. A/T)	1998 cc DOHC MIVEC 24 valve V6	200 PS (147 kW; 197 hp) at 7500 rpm

The power plant of each model can be quickly identified in the engine bay, with the oil cap on the right of the engine cover for the 2.0 DOHC V6 and on the left for the 1.8 SOHC and 2.0 DOHC MIVEC V6. On MIVEC-engined models the front brake calipers are larger, with twin-piston operation, compared to the single-piston units of the other models. The rear single-piston calipers are common across the range. (Some owners may have updated the rear units with those of the larger piston, used on the Evo I/II/III and/or the front units with the larger calipers as used on the GTO + another popular brake mod is using EVO 4 front caliper brackets on a GPX with the standard caliper coupled with 294mm EVO 4 Discs)

The FTO GPX Limited Edition "94–95 Japan Car of the Year"

=== GPX Limited Edition & GR Limited Edition ===
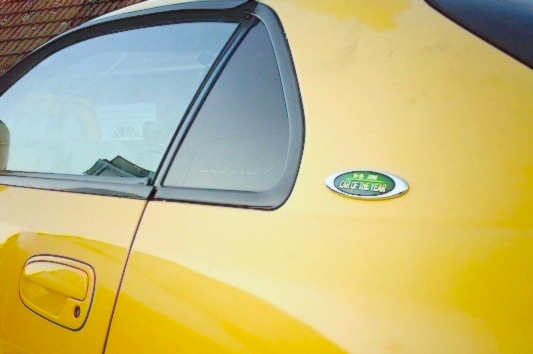
FTO COTY "94-95 Japan Car of the Year" badge (also shows OEM Option wind deflector, for all FTO models)

In commemoration of its win at the Car of the Year Japan awards in 1994, Mitsubishi produced a Limited Edition of their GPX model. This model was finished in a unique dandelion yellow paint scheme with "'94–95 Japan Car of the Year" emblems on the car's C-pillar. It was also installed with a rear screen wash/wiper and limited-slip differential as standard. The LSD units are manual, code: F5M42-2-V7A2 & auto, code: F4A42-1-W7A5. Only 207 GPX Limited Edition models were produced during April 1995, 20 manuals and 187 autos. It is usually referred to, via Car Of The Year acronym, as the FTO "COTY".

Between April and September 1995 a GR Limited Edition was also produced, following up on the kudos of the COTY award win and to satisfy this lower tier sector of the FTO v6 market. The GR LE was only available in Pyrenees Black, Passion Red or Steel Silver.

=== Nakaya-Tune FTO Package ===
The Nakaya-Tune was a limited edition pre-facelift FTO dealership package, introduced prior to the "facelift" FTO launch. This branded tuning package related to Akihiko Nakaya, one of the MCC's racing personalities and driver of a Taeivon Trampio FTO in the All-Japan Grand Touring Car Championship in 1998–1999.

Advertising material of the time (a single-sided full-color leaflet) shows it to be available for the V6-engined GPX, GP and GR models and limited to 300 units. This option package provided: a Purofu brand stainless steel sports silencer, upgraded brake pads, a carbon fibre lip spoiler and upgraded suspension with Öhlins shock absorbers. The suspension ride height is lowered by 35 mm (1.4 in). As an after-market dealer option item, no chassis reference can be given for the three specific models for which it was available. Thus, how many were actually fitted "at point-of-sale" is therefore unclear and may only be evidenced within the dealership sale document of the time.

=== February 1997–July 2000 (Facelift Models) ===
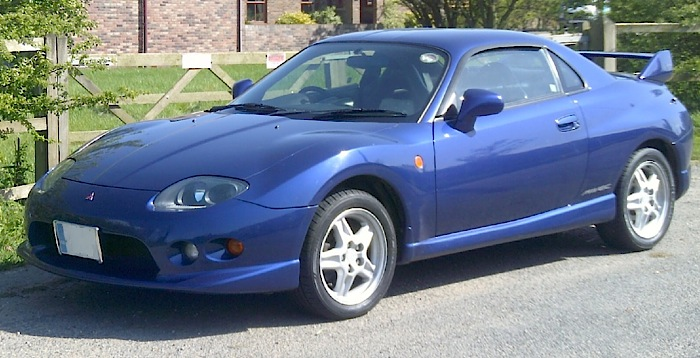
1997 GPX facelift model in Icecelle Blue, fitted with OEM option aero rear spoiler & HID kit

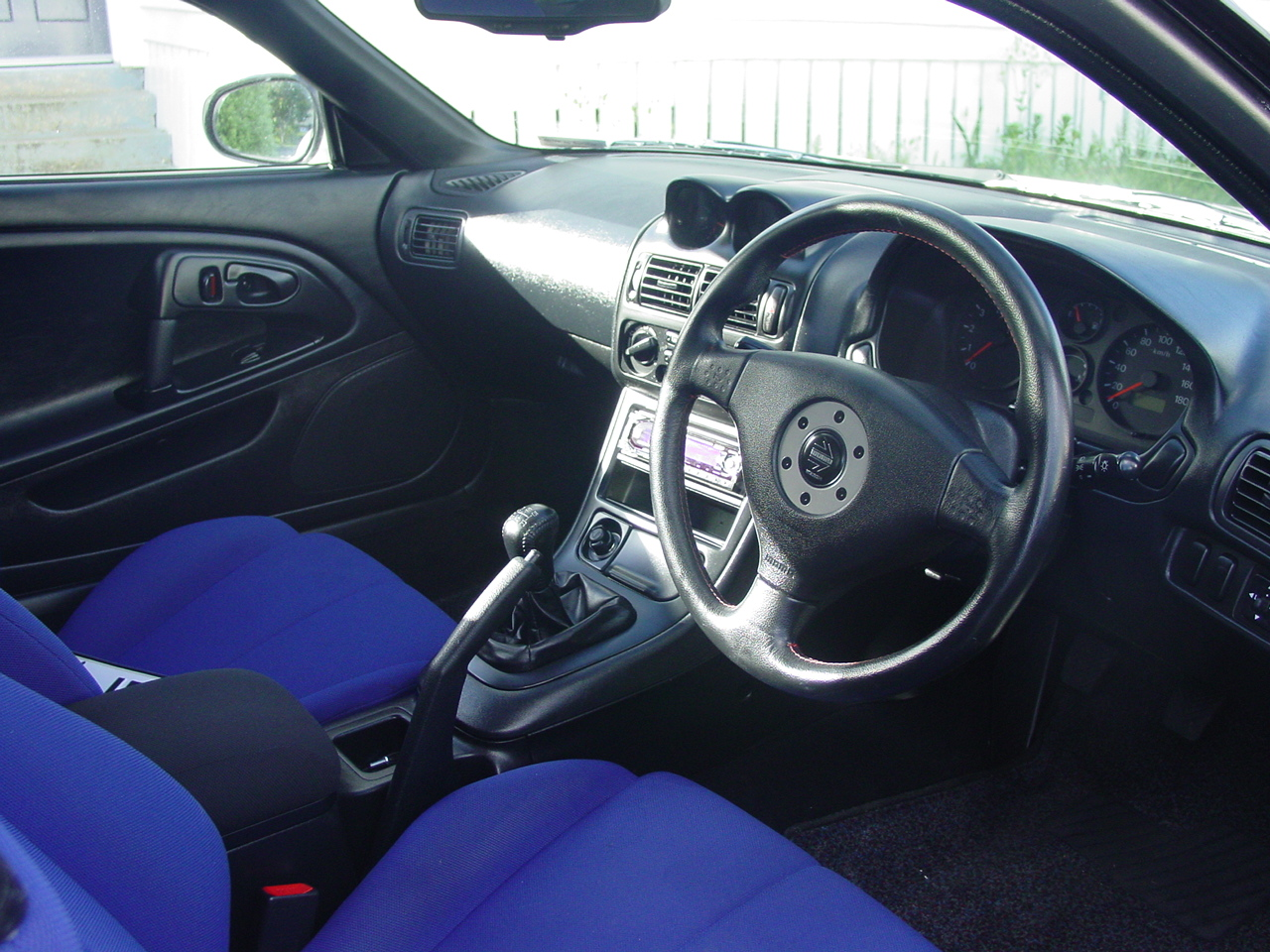
GP Version R (Scotia White) model interior with distinctive blue seats. This interior also shows the three-spoke Momo airbag wheel & manual climate control.

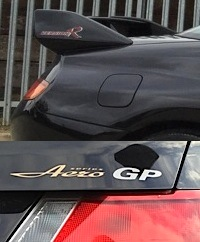
Rear detailing of a GP Version R Aero Series model (Pyrenées black), showing spoiler side fin and boot logos

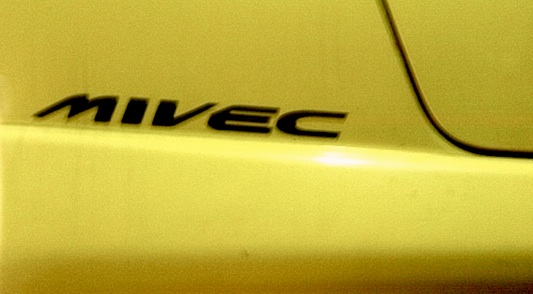
Rear side panel "MIVEC" logo (this example on COTY model)

In February 1997, the FTO model range was given a facelift with a new front bumper arrangement, usually referred to by FTO enthusiasts as "facelift" models. The original two air intakes became one large single intake, blended into a full-width forward-facing front splitter. The two supplementary fog and indicator paired units became four separate circular lights, each recessed into the new bumper. The headlamp internals were also changed to incorporate the vehicle's sidelights, but their external design remained. An HID Option was also made available (which was fitted into a deeper headlamp housing than the halogen).

The rear spoiler also underwent a redesign to an aero wing [aka 'B-wing'], which was phased in during 1997 as standard equipment on some models, such as the GP Version R. After its late introduction in the pre-facelift era, the now facelifted GP was given a full styling make-over with a "Version R" tag - heralding a further external styling feature with this new large spoiler (also fitted as standard on both the later Aero Series GPvR and GX models, or as an OE option for other extant models).

The GP Version R model was produced in Scotia White, Passion Red or Pyrenées Black only. It featured HID headlamps; Black rear seats, with color-coded "FTO" monogrammed front seats - Blue/with Scotia White body color, Black/with Passion Red body color or Red/with Pyrenées Black body color; uprated suspension - 20 mm front anti roll bar instead of 17 mm and a 20 mm rear anti roll bar rather than 18 mm; limited-slip differential and the redesigned rear aero spoiler. A "Version R" decal also features on the two spoiler side wings and on the nearside of the front lip. As this model was lightweight, items such as side skirts, front fog lights, climate control, electric folding mirrors and sound insulation were left out. The later Version R Aero and GX Sports Package Aero models feature an "Aero Series" decal on the offside rear of the boot lid.

A further refinement to the facelift range was via the two GX models, with a 3 mm wider bore in the throttle body (increased from 60 mm to 63 mm and mated to the plenum bore), helping to provide the additional 10 PS over the earlier GR model engine. Whilst the GR model continued to offer only 4-speed auto and 5-speed manual into the "facelift" era, the GX Sport and GX Sport Aero upgrade came either as 5-speed manual or 5-speed automatic. On the GS and GR models aircon operation became manual from Feb 1997.

The LSD option, found standard on the pre-facelift GPX Limited Edition, was a viscous type. However, by 1997 this option for the facelift models, found standard on the GP Version R, was similar to that of a Torsen type.

Model name	Model code (VIN)	Engine	Peak power
GS (Feb 1997)	GF-DE2A HNUE (5-sp. M/T); GF-DE2A HRUE (4-sp. A/T)	1834 cc SOHC 16 valve inline-four	125 PS (92 kW; 123 hp) at 6000 rpm
GR (Feb 1997)	GF-DE3A HNHM (5-sp. M/T); GF-DE3A HRHM (4-sp. A/T)	1998 cc DOHC 24 valve V6	170 PS (125 kW; 168 hp) at 7000 rpm
GPX (Feb 1997)	DE3A HNGH (5-sp. M/T); DE3A HYGH (5-sp. A/T)	1998 cc DOHC MIVEC 24 valve V6	200 PS (147 kW; 197 hp) at 7500 rpm
GX Sports Package (Feb 1997)	DE3A HNXM (5-sp. M/T); DE3A HYXM (5-sp. A/T)	1998 cc DOHC 24 valve V6	180 PS (132 kW; 178 hp) at 7000 rpm
GX Sports Package Aero Series (Nov 1997)	DE3A HNXM4 (5-sp. M/T); DE3A HYXM4 (5-sp. A/T)	1998 cc DOHC 24 valve V6	180 PS (132 kW; 178 hp) at 7000 rpm
GP Version R (Feb 1997)	DE3A HNFH3 (5-sp. M/T); DE3A HYFH3 (5-sp. A/T)	1998 cc DOHC MIVEC 24 valve V6	200 PS (147 kW; 197 hp) at 7500 rpm
GP Version R Aero Series (Nov 1997)	DE3A HNFH4 (5-sp. M/T); DE3A HYFH4 (5-sp. A/T)	1998 cc DOHC MIVEC 24 valve V6	200 PS (147 kW; 197 hp) at 7500 rpm

=== End of production ===
In July 2000, new side impact safety standards were to take effect in Japan. With the FTO sales moving at an ever slower pace, it was deemed not cost effective to update the car and it was thus discontinued, along with its bigger stablemate the GTO.

Pre-facelift vs Facelift. Interchanging the pre-facelift and the facelift bumper unit is a relatively simple matter and, as the latter version models have become write-offs over the years, there are many pre-facelift models now on the road that are sporting newer facelift bumpers. A simple check of the VIN Plate details, or the period of manufacture to be found on the seat-belt tags, should resolve any uncertainty as to the origin of the model-build. Apart from body styling, there are other less apparent differences in the facelift models, including an uprated ECU and also distinct variations to the drive shaft units across the range such as 25 or 27-spline shafts and CV cup variants, as well as fitment for ABS or non-ABS shafts and bearings for same.

== Electric FTO (1999) ==
An experimental electric version of the FTO was produced (called the FTOEV), utilizing high-performance lithium-ion batteries, and set a record when it covered 2,000 kilometres (1,200 mi) in 24 hours in December 1999.

== Awards ==
The FTO won the Car of the Year Japan award for 1994–95 upon its debut, awarded in December 1994. It was also voted Best Used Sports Car at the British Auto Trader Awards in November 2007.

A Team Taeivon Ralliart FTO, driven by Takahiko Hara and Akihiko Nakaya, also appeared in the top five of the GT300 Class in the 1998 JGTC season

== Reviews ==
=== Promo Video (Pre-facelift) ===
Japanese promotional footage of the early FTO was also released in 1995 This has some helpful graphics of the FTO features found on the GR Sports (a Steel Silver model) and a GPX (a Passion Red model).

=== Top Gear (Facelift) ===
Just prior to its demise, the FTO became an official import to UK, available from Mitsubishi dealerships. A review of the FTO facelift model in this period was also given on TV's "Top Gear" by Vicki Butler-Henderson.

=== FTO - Europe's fastest FWD (2014) ===
Since 2009, the highly modified FTO of owner/driver Richard Batty has consistently popped up in British drag race runoff results through the years. In 2014 Batty finally gained a new European FWD Record with 8.859 at 174.59 mph in his 1,051 hp (784 kW) EVO-engined FTO.

== Options ==
During the relatively short production period of the FTO there were original equipment catalogues of a host of options made available. Many items were cosmetic in nature, such as stickers or chromed goods, although more substantial styling pieces such as side skirts and spoilers were also available. Practical items such as a passenger airbag, installed in the dashboard above the glovebox, or ski-racks were also listed. There were also special 15 and 16 inch PIAA alloy wheels. Strut braces, as found standard on the GP Version R for example, and machine-stamped Ralliart was also available via the Mitsubishi association with the Ralliart franchise.

The latter company also carried out modifications to many FTOs during the period in which they were imported to the UK via that company, based at King Street in Dudley. These included installation of an aftermarket rear fog-light and its illuminated dashboard switch to meet UK legislation (Not OEM, or a requirement in Japan). The Company may also have fitted an English text version of fuse box cover in the engine bay, and/or a RalliArt oil cap.

Anti-lock braking system (ABS) and Traction control system (TCS) (referred to as TCL on FTOs) can also be found as factory-fitted options on some earlier models such as the sports GX model. An easy-visual check for fitment of ABS to an FTO is to look in the engine bay - an alloy block, with six brake pipes emerging, will be present behind the battery and down against the bulkhead. ABS was standard equipment on facelift models.

The base GS and GR models came without a rear spoiler, which was an OEM Option. The only company now stocking numerous parts for these cars is www.viamoto.co.uk.

== Annual production ==
Total FTO model production by year is as follows:

Model	1994	1995	1996	1997	1998	1999	2000	Model Total
GS	817	2586	380	206	112	80	20	4201
GR	5423	6726	158	66	37	19	4	12433
GR Limited Edition	0	1602	0	0	0	0	0	1602
GR Sports Package	0	2	1807	0	0	0	0	1809
GPX	2992	8505	1267	566	237	155	81	13803
GPX Limited Edition	0	207	0	0	0	0	0	207
GP	0	1	77	0	0	0	0	78
GP Special	0	0	122	0	0	0	0	122
GX Sports Pack	0	0	0	768	307	199	69	1343
GPvR	0	0	0	353	102	65	22	542
GX Aero	0	0	0	19	144	73	59	295
GPvR Aero	0	0	0	16	199	99	56	370
Total Per Year	9232	19629	3811	1994	1138	690	311	36805

These are Production dates. Whilst some models may have been produced on the production line to Customer pre-order specifications, the majority would not instantly be purchased, registered and "on the road". For example, an FTO first registered in Japan in 2001 will therefore be at least a year old (from the last Production Year of 2000). If that used vehicle is then exported and sold in the UK in say 2003, then the DVLA "first registered" date is very likely to be 2003.

=== Chassis Numbering ===
Whilst the month/year date on seat belt tags can assist in clarifying a production date when purchasing a used FTO, the first three digits of the Chassis number on the FTO VIN plate (located on the engine bay baulk-head, e.g. E-DE3A XXXXXXX where X is a chassis number) will certainly provide the actual manufacturing year:
000 = 1994/1995; 010 = 1995/1996; 020 = 1997; 030 = 1998 etc.

=== Model Codes ===
The model code, usually consisting of four digits and stamped on the VIN plate (i.e. HNUE), can be read left-to-right as follows:
Body Style: H = 2 door coupe
Transmission: N = 5-speed manual / R = 4-speed auto / Y = 5-speed auto
Model Type: U = GS model / H = GR model / G = GPX model / X = GX model / F = GP model
Engine: E = SOHC EFI / M = DOHC EFI / H = DOHC EFI MIVEC

(Numeric suffixes to these four digits generally indicate later model build changes)

A DE2A prefix refers to the 1.8 4G93 16-valve engine. A DE3A prefix refers to 2.0 6A12 engine.

== Total production by transmission type ==
The build quantity per 5-speed manual, 4-speed auto and 5-speed auto models.

Model	5-Speed Manual	4-Speed Automatic	5-Speed Automatic	Gearbox Total
GS	1205	2996	0	4201
GR	2306	10127	0	12433
GR Limited Edition	215	1387	0	1602
GR Sports Package	567	1242	0	1809
GPX	4329	8921	553	13083
GPX Limited Edition	20	187	0	207
GP	42	36	0	78
GP Special	22	100	0	122
GX Sports Pack	460	0	883	1343
GPvR	322	0	220	542
GX Aero	131	0	164	295
GPvR Aero	240	0	130	370
Gear Type Total	9859	24996	1950	36805

=== Recalls ===
Whilst Mitsubishi was given some media attention in 2004 regarding various vehicle defects, the FTO had four relatively minor defects requiring manufacturer recalls in its history - three of which were in 2004, some four years after production ceased.
