= Mitsubishi Neptune engine =

Neptune engine

Overview
- Manufacturer: Mitsubishi Motors
- Also called: 4G4
- Production: 1971–1981

Layout
- Configuration: Inline-4
- Displacement: 1.2–1.4 L (1,188–1,378 cc)
- Cylinder bore: 71 mm (2.8 in); 76.5 mm (3.01 in)
- Piston stroke: 75 mm (2.95 in)
- Cylinder block material: Cast iron
- Valvetrain: OHV 2 valves x cyl.
- Compression ratio: 9.0:1

Combustion
- Fuel type: Gasoline
- Cooling system: Water-cooled

Output
- Power output: 70–87 PS (51–64 kW; 69–86 hp)
- Torque output: 9.7–11.7 kg⋅m (95–115 N⋅m; 70–85 lb⋅ft)

Chronology
- Predecessor: KE engine
- Successor: 4G1 Orion

The Mitsubishi Neptune or 4G4 engine is a series of iron-block OHV inline-four engines built by Mitsubishi Motors from June 1971 to 1981. This was to be Mitsubishi's last OHV engine. The inability to clear new passenger car emissions rules for 1978 meant that the Neptunes were replaced by the 4G1 Orion. The Neptune continued to be built until 1979 for commercial vehicles, which suffered less restrictive environmental regulations and until about 1981 for other applications. Around 520,000 Neptune engines were built.

== 4G41 ==
Displacement — 1.4 L (1,378 cc)
Bore x Stroke — 76.5 mm × 75 mm (3.01 in × 2.95 in)
Power — 86 PS (63 kW; 85 hp) at 6,000 rpm (single carb)

95 PS (70 kW; 94 hp) at 6,300 rpm (Galant FTO, twin carb)
28 PS (21 kW; 28 hp) at 2,700 rpm in a 1972 FG15 forklift

Torque — 11.7 kg⋅m (115 N⋅m; 85 lb⋅ft) at 4,000 rpm (single carb)

8.6 kg⋅m (84 N⋅m; 62 lb⋅ft) at 2,000 rpm in a 1972 FG15 forklift

=== Applications ===
- Mitsubishi Galant
- 1971-1973 Mitsubishi Galant FTO
- 1971.10-1979.06 Mitsubishi Delica 75/1400
- Mitsubishi Forklift FG14, FG15

== 4G42 ==
Displacement — 1.2 L (1,188 cc)
Bore x Stroke — 71 mm × 75 mm (2.80 in × 2.95 in)
Power — 70 PS (51 kW; 69 hp) SAE at 6,000 rpm
Torque — 9.7 kg⋅m (95 N⋅m; 70 lb⋅ft) at 4,000 rpm

=== Applications ===
- 1973.02-1975.10 Mitsubishi Lancer A71A
- 1973.09-1976.10 Mitsubishi Lancer Van A71V

== See also ==
- List of Mitsubishi engines
