= Mitsubishi Galant FTO =

Mitsubishi Galant Coupé FTO
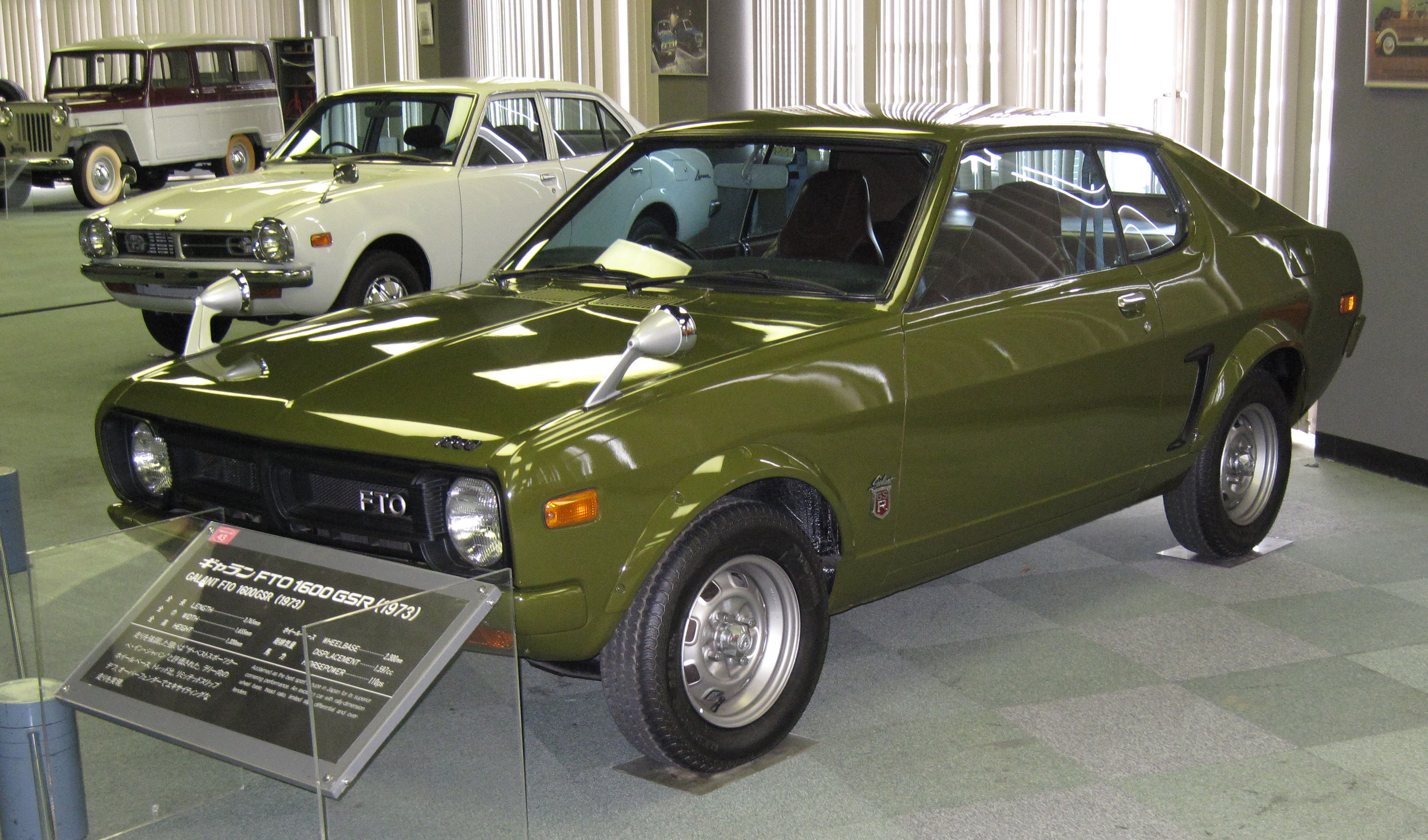

Overview
- Manufacturer: Mitsubishi Motors
- Production: November 1971 – March 1975
- Assembly: Japan: Okazaki, Aichi (Nagoya Plant)
- Designer: Kensaku Kobayashi, Toshihiro Itō, Shinichi Yamamura

Body and chassis
- Class: Sports car
- Body style: 2-door hardtop coupé

Powertrain
- Engine: 1.4 L Neptune 4G41 I4 (1971–1973); 1.4 L Saturn 4G33 I4 (1973–1975); 1.6 L Saturn 4G32 I4 (1973–75)
- Transmission: 4/5-speed manual

Dimensions
- Wheelbase: 2,300 mm (90.6 in)
- Length: 3,765 mm (148.2 in)
- Width: 1,580–1,655 mm (62.2–65.2 in)
- Height: 1,320 mm (52.0 in)

Chronology
- Successor: Mitsubishi Lancer Celeste

The Mitsubishi Galant Coupé FTO is a rear-wheel drive coupe produced by Japanese automaker Mitsubishi Motors from November 1971 to March 1975. "FTO" was meant to stand for Fresco Turismo Omologato, in a fine example of Japanese Italian. The compact Coupé FTO can be seen as the replacement for the earlier Mitsubishi Colt 11-F Super Sports.

The FTO was first introduced with an 86 or 95 PS (63 or 70 kW) 1,378 cc 4G41 "Neptune" engine, until it was replaced in a February 1973 redesign by a pair of 1,597 cc 4G32 "Saturn" powerplants, offering either 100 PS (74 kW) or 110 PS (81 kW) depending on the state of tune. There was also a 1,439 cc Saturn engine, offering 92 PS (68 kW). In October 1973 there was a minor facelift, and the lineup was restricted to four versions as the EL, GS, and four-speed SL versions were cancelled. Production gradually came to an end in August 1975, after the introduction in March that year of the more staid Lancer Celeste.

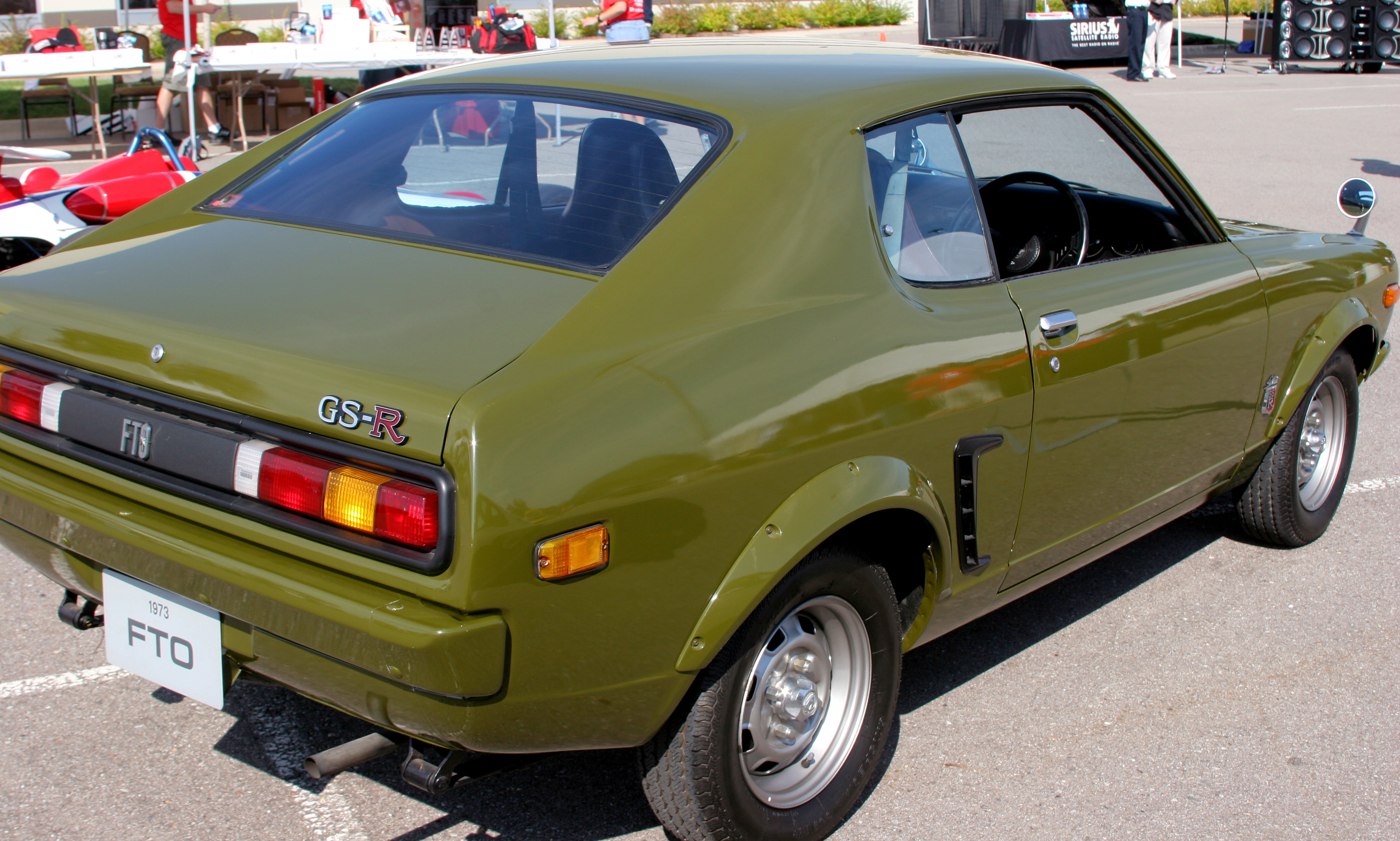
Rear side view of 1973 Galant FTO 1600 GSR

The FTO was based on the chassis of the first generation Mitsubishi Galant, shortened by 12 cm (5 in) for extra agility and lightness. It carried the chassis codes A61 (Neptune 1.4), A62 (Saturn 1.4), and A63 (Saturn 1.6). 1600 GSRs built before October 1974 (when safety standards were changed) received black plastic wheelarch extensions to accommodate a wider track, resulting in an even more aggressive look. The GSR also featured a standard limited slip differential.

The FTO name was again resurrected twenty years after production of the original had ceased, when the company introduced the front-wheel drive Mitsubishi FTO in 1994.

== Data ==
Primary data sources for each model are given in the first row. Data sourced elsewhere is referenced in each individual cell where it is used.

Mitsubishi Galant Coupé FTO
		G I, G II	G III	1400 EL, GL, SL–5	1600 SL, SL–5	1600 GS–5, GSR
Layout		Front engine, rear-wheel drive				
Transmission		4-speed manual		4/5-speed manual		5-speed manual
Suspension F/R		Coil sprung independent MacPherson struts, anti-roll bar / Live axle and semi-elliptic leaf springs				
Brakes	front	drums, G II: discs	discs	drums or discs		discs
Brakes	rear	drums				
Wheelbase		2,300 mm (90.6 in)				
Length		3,765 mm (148.2 in)				
Width		1,580 mm (62.2 in)				1580–1655 mm (62.2–65.2 in)
Height		1,330 mm (52.4 in)				1,320 mm (52.0 in)
Empty weight		820 kg (1,808 lb) G II: 825 kg (1,819 lb)	835 kg (1,841 lb)	830 kg (1,830 lb)	860 kg (1,896 lb)	875 kg (1,929 lb)
Engine		Neptune 4G41 (A61)		Saturn 4G33 (A62)	Saturn 4G32 (A63)	
Engine		Water-cooled OHV inline-4, two valves per cylinder		Water-cooled SOHC inline-4, two valves per cylinder		
Displacement		1,378 cc (76.5 x 75.0mm)		1,439 cc (73.0 x 86.0mm)	1,597 cc (76.9 x 86.0mm)	
Carburetor		1 twin-barrel Stromberg	2 single-barrel Stromberg	1 twin-barrel Stromberg		2 single-barrel SU
Power (JIS Gross)		86 PS (63 kW) at 6,000 rpm	95 PS (70 kW) at 6,300 rpm	92 PS (68 kW) at 6,300 rpm	100 PS (74 kW) at 6,300 rpm	110 PS (81 kW) at 6,700 rpm
Torque		11.7 kg⋅m (115 N⋅m; 85 lb⋅ft) at 4,000 rpm	12.3 kg⋅m (121 N⋅m; 89 lb⋅ft) at 4,500 rpm	12.5 kg⋅m (123 N⋅m; 90 lb⋅ft) at 4,000 rpm	14.0 kg⋅m (137 N⋅m; 101 lb⋅ft) at 4,000 rpm	14.2 kg⋅m (139 N⋅m; 103 lb⋅ft) at 4,800 rpm
Top Speed		160 km/h (99 mph)	165 km/h (103 mph)	165 km/h (103 mph)	175 km/h (109 mph)	180 km/h (112 mph)
Acceleration (0→400m)		n/a	17.2 s	n/a	n/a	16.4 s
Tires		6.15 × 13 4PR	6.15 × 13 4PR optional: 155 SR13		n/a	155 SR13 GSR: 175/70 SR13
