= Mahindra Jeeto =

Indian light commercial vehicle

Mahindra Jeeto (P601)

Overview
- Manufacturer: Mahindra & Mahindra Limited
- Also called: Mahindra Zeo (electric)
- Production: June 2015–present
- Assembly: Zaheerabad, Telangana, India

Body and chassis
- Class: Mini truck Microvan
- Body style: 2-door pickup; 5-door van

Powertrain
- Engine: 625 cc m_Dura diesel
- Transmission: 4-speed manual

Dimensions
- Wheelbase: 2,250 mm (88.6 in)–2,500 mm (98.4 in)
- Length: 3,281 mm (129.2 in)–3,876 mm (152.6 in)
- Width: 1,498 mm (59.0 in) (base model)
- Height: 1,750 mm (68.9 in) (base model)
- Curb weight: 1,445 kg (3,186 lb) (base model)

Chronology
- Predecessor: Mahindra Gio

The Mahindra Jeeto is a light commercial vehicle by Indian vehicle manufacturer Mahindra, produced in Zaheerabad, Telangana since June 2015.

== Overview ==
The Mahindra Jeeto, intended to replace the Mahindra Gio LCV which went on sale in October 2009, was launched in June 2015 as a 2-door mini pickup truck with a starting price of ₹2.35 lakh with eight variants under three different model series, S, L, and X series, all with varying payloads and deck lengths. The 5-seat microvan variant was launched two years later in July 2017 at a price of Rs. 3.45 lakh.

=== Plus variant ===
In November 2019, an extended-length variant of the base Jeeto pickup, the Jeeto Plus, was launched at ₹3.46 lakh, with an increased payload of 715 kg (1,576 lb) over the base model's 600 kg (1,300 lb) and an overall length of 3,876 mm (152.6 in).

== Engine ==
The Jeeto lineup uses Mahindra's 625 cc m_Dura water-cooled direct injection (DI) diesel engine, which is exclusively available in the Jeeto. It has a maximum power output of 16 horsepower and 38 Nm of peak torque.
