= Birla Tyres =

Indian tyre company

- Type: Public
- Traded as: NSE: BIRLATYRE; BSE: 542932
- Industry: Tyres
- Founded: 1991; 35 years ago
- Headquarters: Kolkata, West Bengal, India
- Parent: Himadri Speciality Chemical Limited
- Website: birlatyre.com

Birla Tyres is an Indian company engaged in the manufacture of tyres for automobiles, motorcycles, commercial vehicles, farm vehicles and heavy earth-moving machinery. It has over 170 sales depots with more than 491 sales engineers and 8,831 dealers at major locations.

== History ==
Birla Tyres was first established in 1991 as a division of Kesoram Industries. It then collaborated with tyre manufacturer Pirelli, in the production and development of its tyres. In 2023, the company was acquired by Himadri Specialty Chemical Limited and Dalmia Bharat Refractories under an insolvency plan. In 2025, the company was wholly acquired by Himadri Specialty Chemical Limited.

== Products ==
Birla Tyres have a wide range of tyres from motorcycles to farm tractors. The company manufactures bias and radial tyres with over 170 sales depots in India and in the international network across 17 countries worldwide. The company produces truck & bus tyre, SCV & LCV tyre, passenger car tyre, two & three wheelers tyre, farm and mining tyres.

== Awards and recognition ==
- 2012: Capexil Special Export Award 2012-13
- 2018: Ranked 67th worldwide on the Tire Business Global Top 75 Tire Makers list in 2018.
