= CMC Veryca =

Taiwanese cabover kei truck and microvan

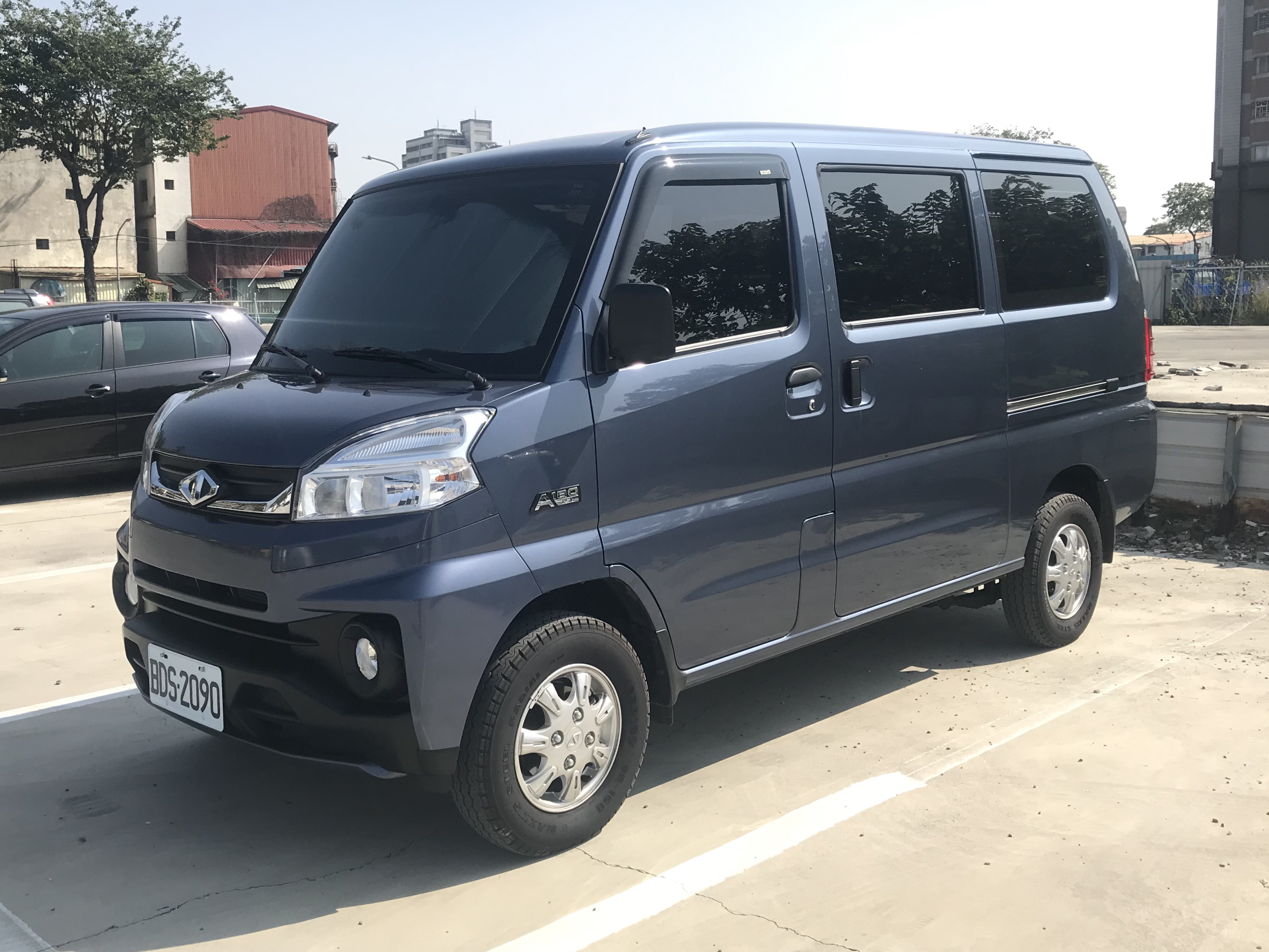

Overview
- Manufacturer: China Motor Corporation
- Also called: Soueast Veryca (China); Soueast C1 Xiwang (China); Vantage Primo (United States)
- Production: 2000–present

Body and chassis
- Class: Minivan; Mini truck
- Body style: 5-door Van; 2-door Pickup truck/Flatbed truck
- Layout: FR layout, F4 layout

Chronology
- Successor: CMC J Space

The CMC Veryca (Chinese: 中華菱利; pinyin: Zhōnghuá Líng Lì) is a cabover microvan and mini truck built and sold in Taiwan by the Taiwanese automaker China Motor Corporation (CMC) (中華汽車) since 2000. A new series of this model, called CMC J Space was launched in 2024.

The CMC Veryca started off as long wheelbase iterations of the fourth generation Mitsubishi Minicab, the Town Box Wide, available with a variety of bodywork. Unrestricted by the kei class regulations, the engines used soon grew larger than the ones used in Japan.

Its predecessor CMC Minicab (中華百利), CMC's first commercial vehicle product, entered production in 1978, later became CMC Varica (中華威利) in 1985.

In 2013, CMC launched its first independent product, the CMC Leadca, redesigned all of its products, and started to brand them with the CMC badge instead of the Mitsubishi badge. The Delica and Veryca received their CMC facelift in 2013 while the CMC Zinger was not facelifted until 2015.

== CMC Minicab (1978-1984) ==
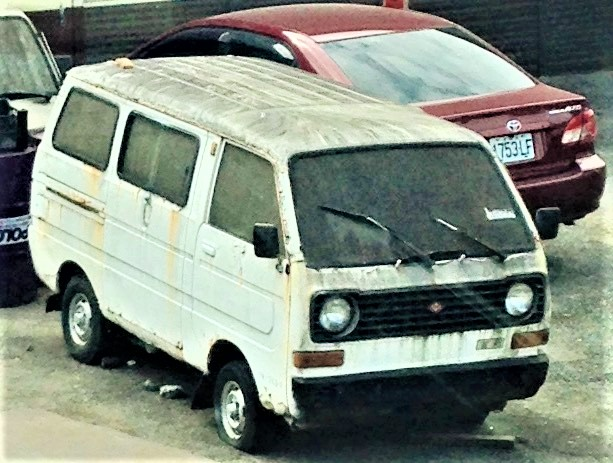
CMC Minicab van (1978-1984)

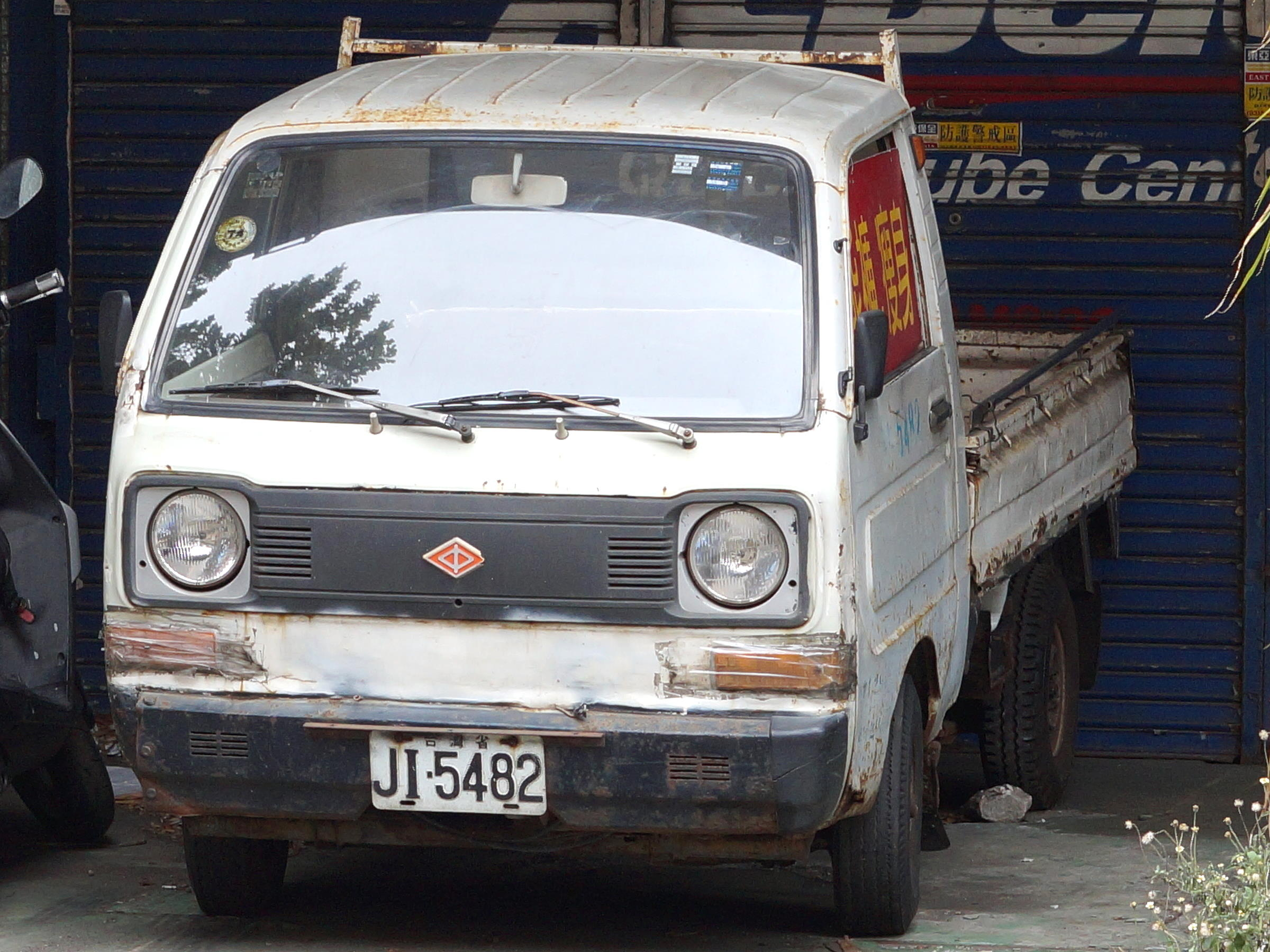
CMC Minicab box truck (1978-1984)

The CMC Minicab debuted in 1978, it was a locally manufactured rebadged third generation Mitsubishi Minicab, and was the first commercial vehicle product of China Motor Corporation. The Chinese name was 百利 (Bǎi Lì).

=== Second Generation (1985-1988) ===
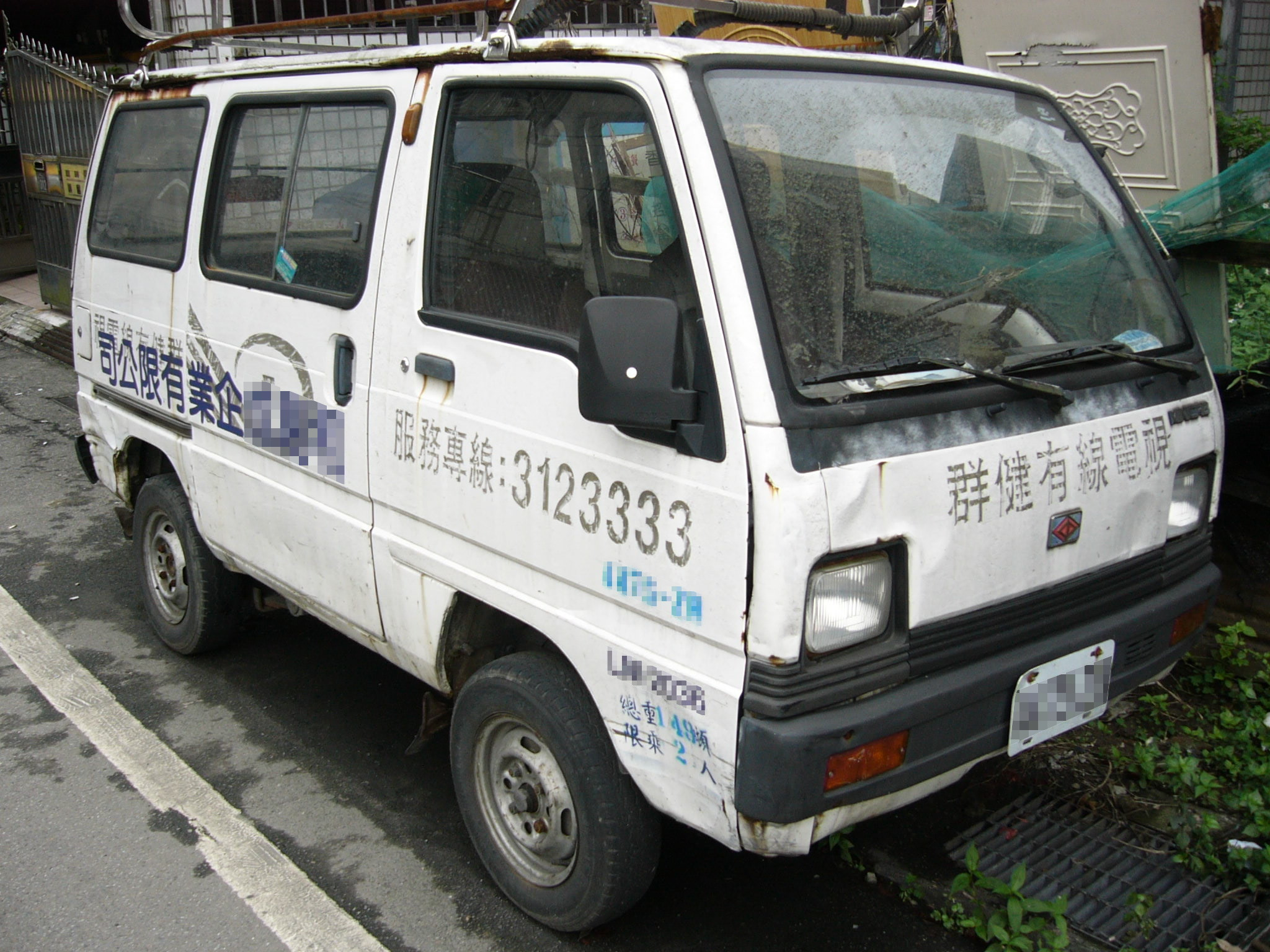

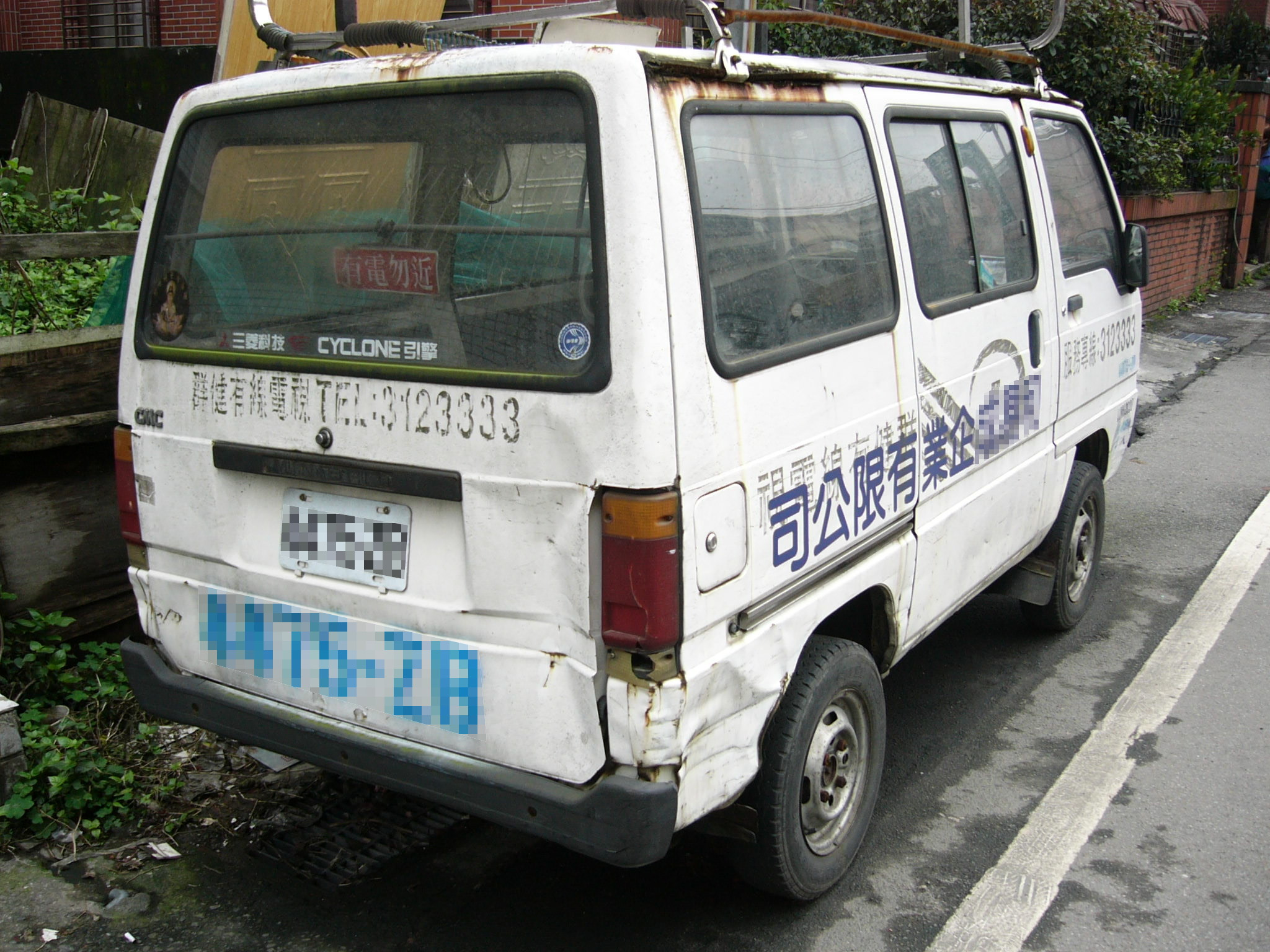
CMC Varica van (1985-1988)

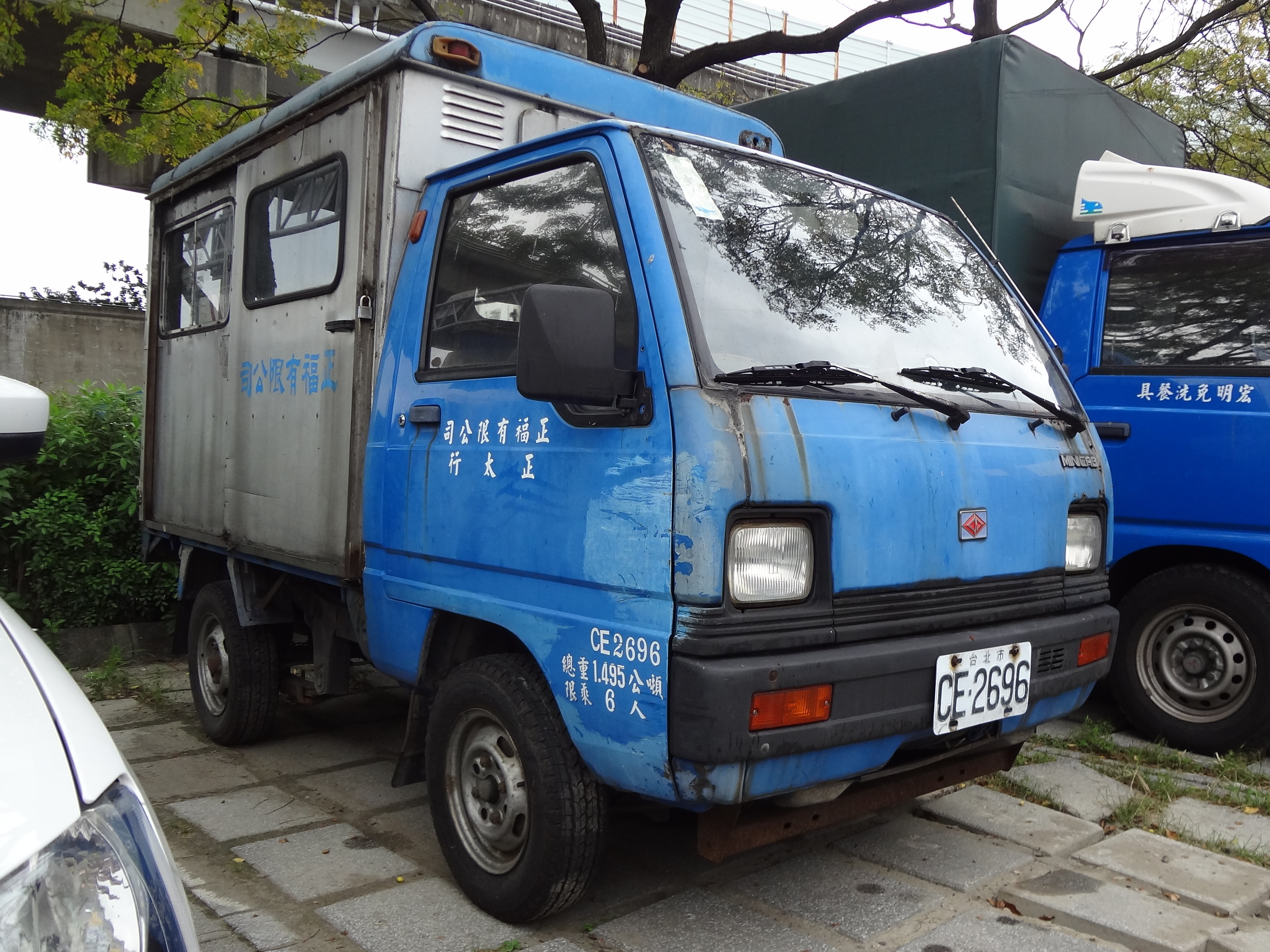
CMC Varica pickup truck modified with a box (1985-1988)

The second generation CMC Minivan debuted in 1985, a rebadged version of the fourth generation Mitsubishi Minicab.

== CMC Varica (1989-1997) ==
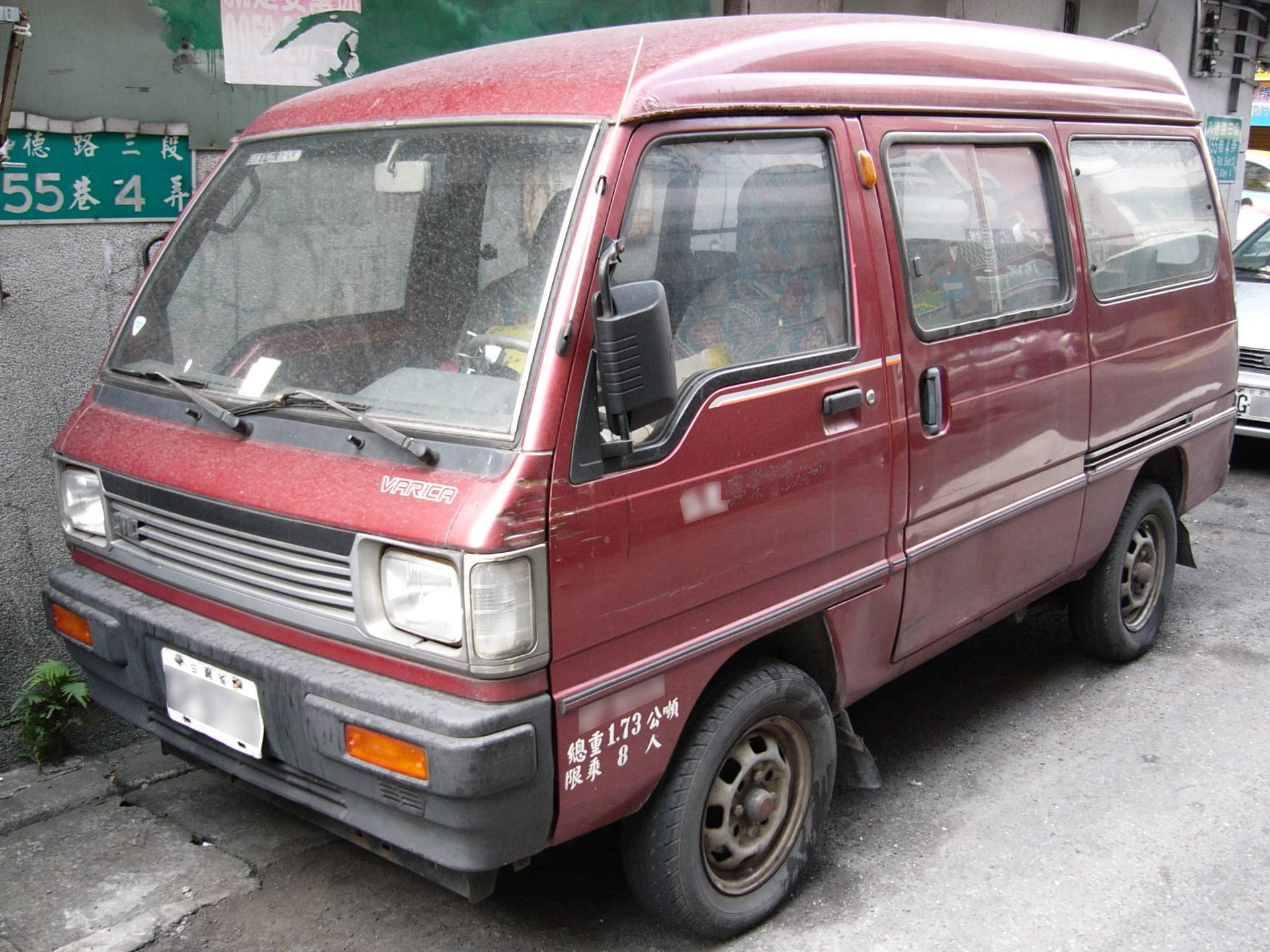

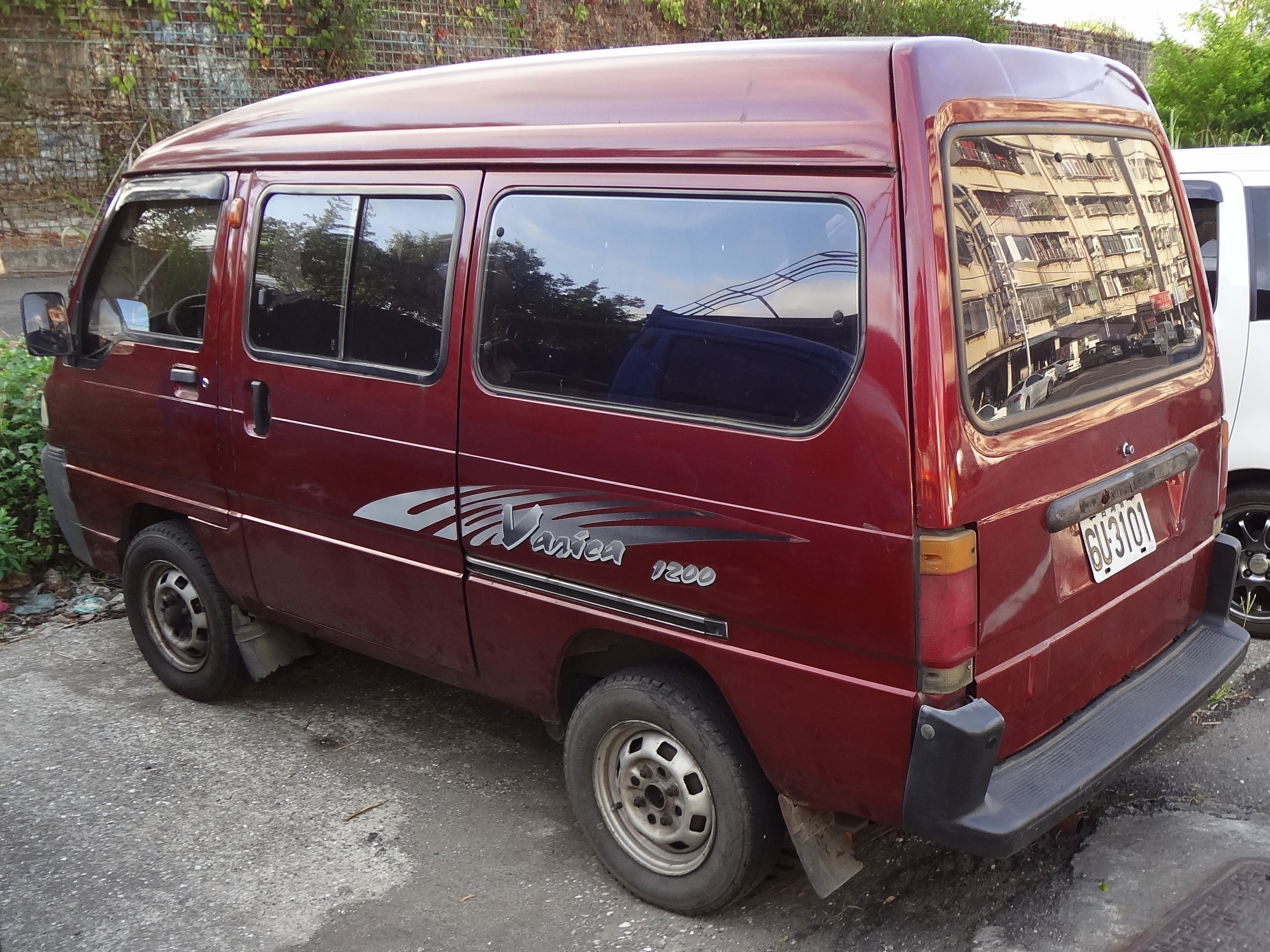
CMC Varica van (1989-1992)

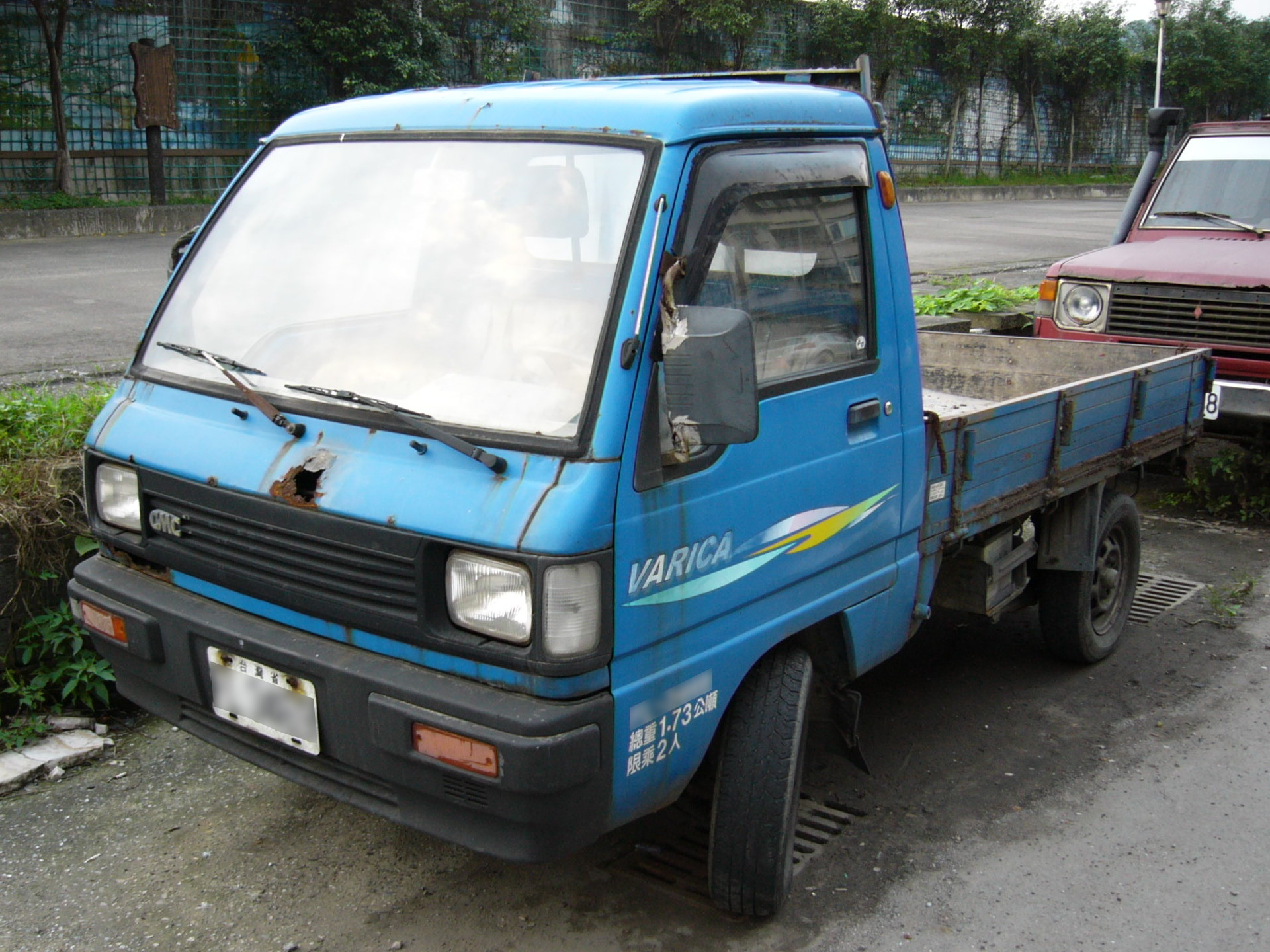
CMC Varica pickup truck (1989-1992)

Based on the same structure as the second generation CMC Minivan, the Varica was redesigned by Yulon and debuted in 1988 for the 1989 model year. The Chinese name was changed to be 威利 (Wēi Lì).

This generation was equipped with a 1061 cc 4G82 engine with 58 PS (43 kW). Overall length was up to 3,645 mm (143.5 in), with a wheelbase lengthened to 1,475 mm (58.1 in) right in front of the rear axle. Top speed was 115 km/h (71 mph). The Varica's nose was also extended somewhat.

From November 2004 India's Premier has been building a diesel powered Varica. Its body panels are shipped from Taiwan, and a Hindustan-built 2-liter Isuzu diesel unit is fitted. It has 58 hp (43 kW) and is mated to a four-speed manual gearbox, while the car offers from five to nine seats. A multitude of other versions have since been developed, and as of 2009 the engine has been replaced by a 1.5 liter IDI diesel (with or without turbo) or by the CNG-powered 1.8-liter 4ZB1 (both still manufactured by Hindustan). The Sigma was discontinued around 2012, but the pickup version (called the Premier Roadstar) remains available with both engine options as of 2019.

=== First Facelift (1993-1997) ===
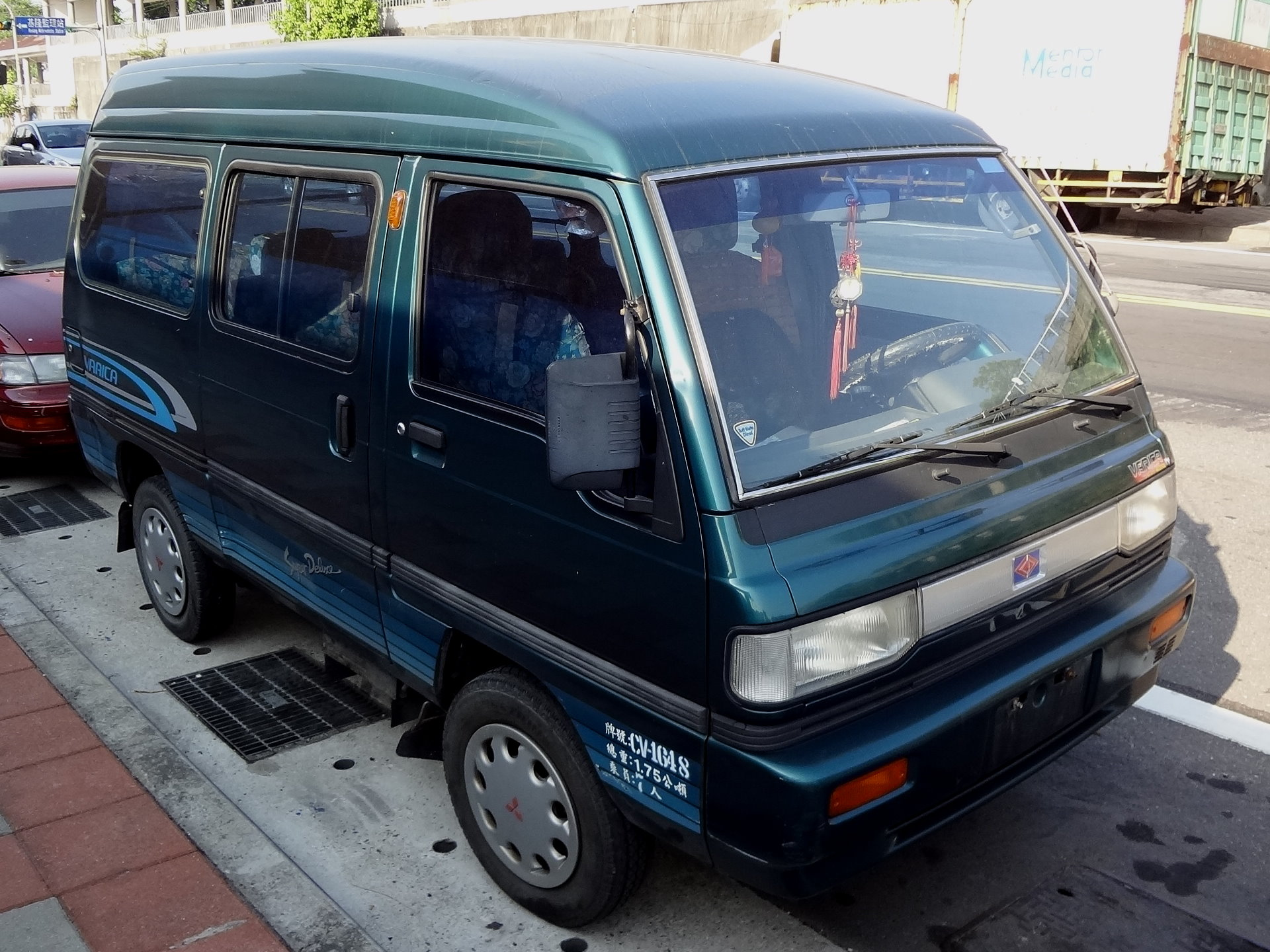
CMC Varica van facelift (1993-1997)

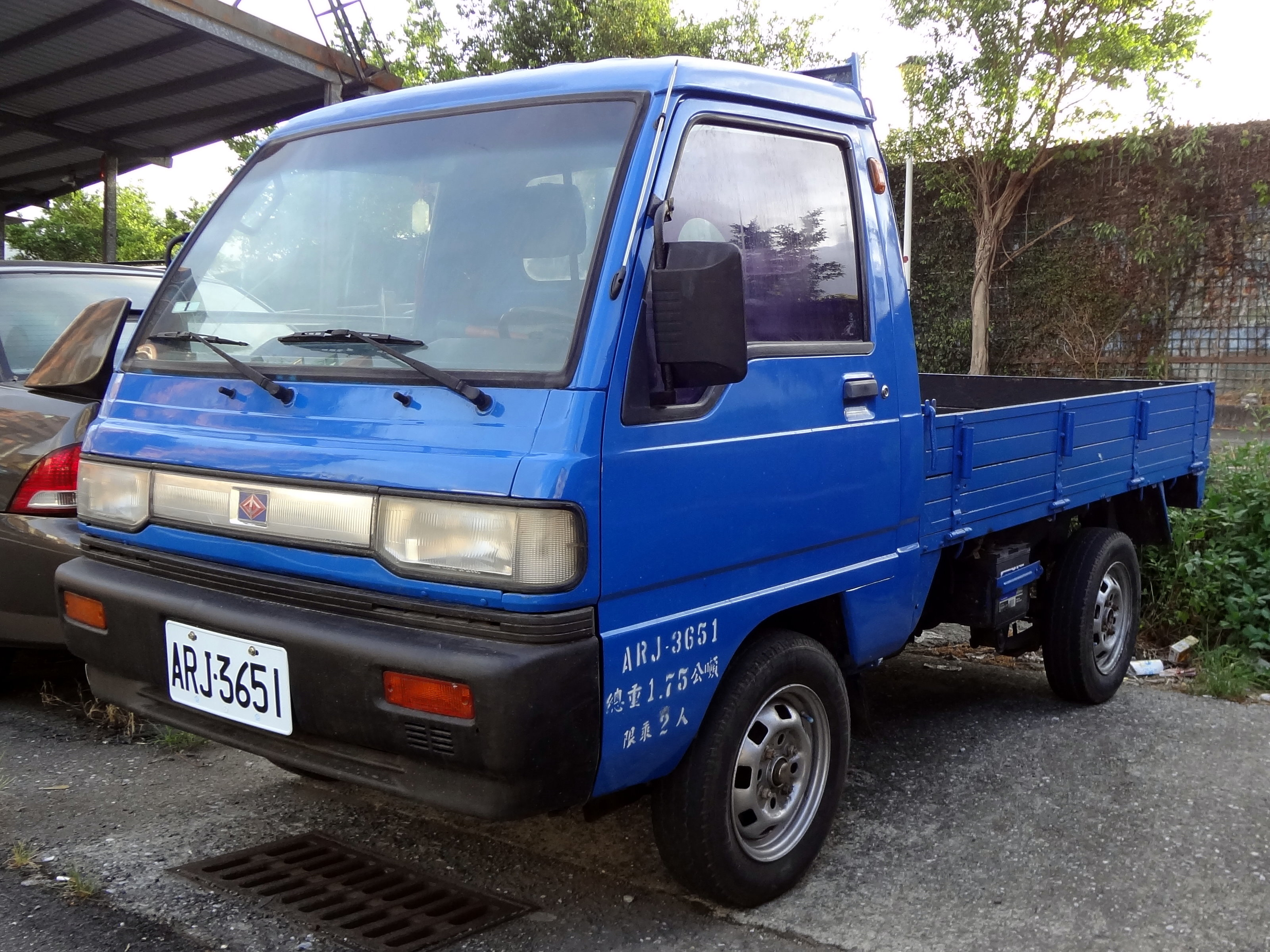
CMC Varica pickup truck (1993-1997)

Varica received a facelift in 1993, updating the headlamps while canceling the grilles.

=== Second Facelift (1998-2007) ===
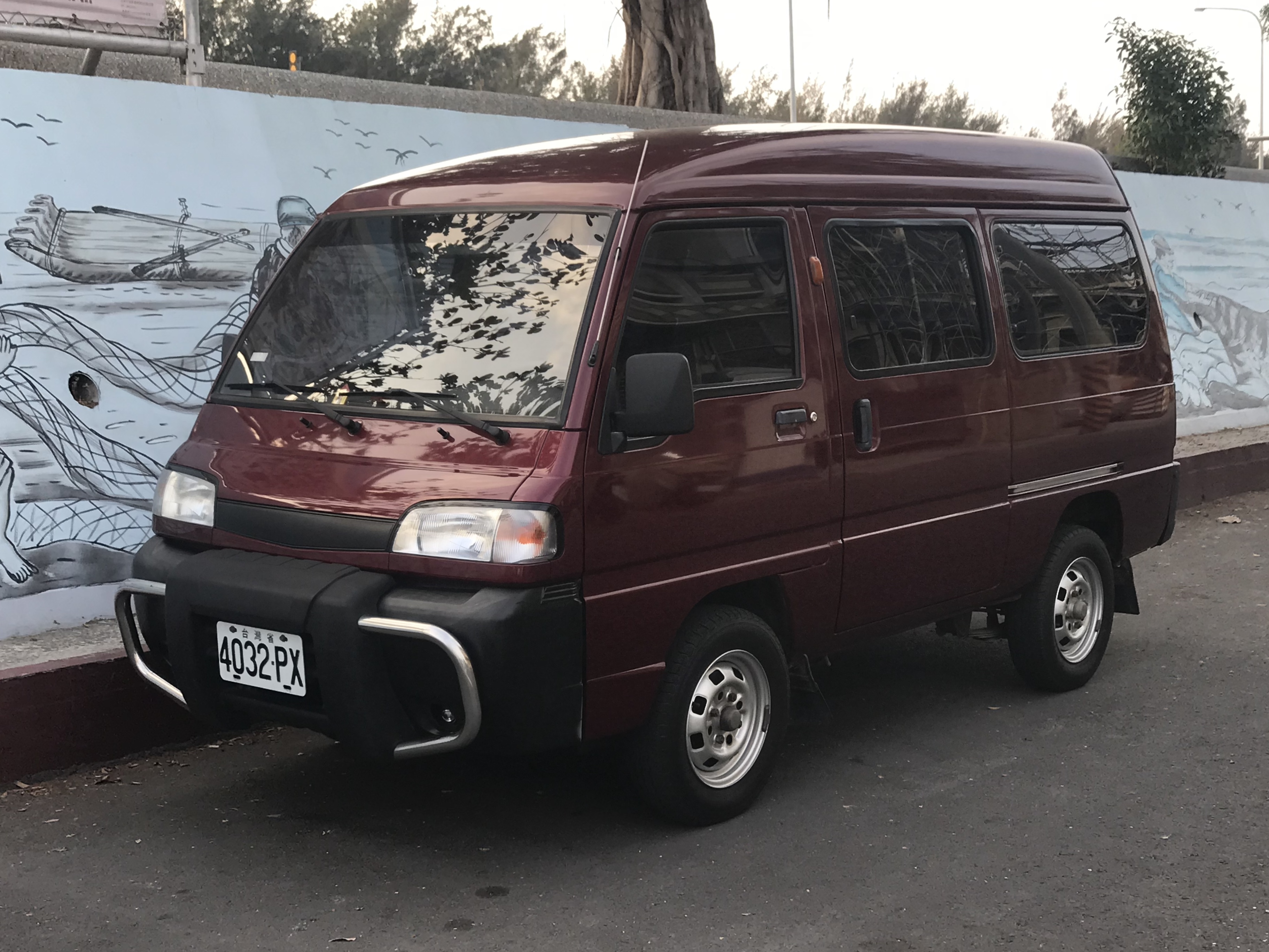

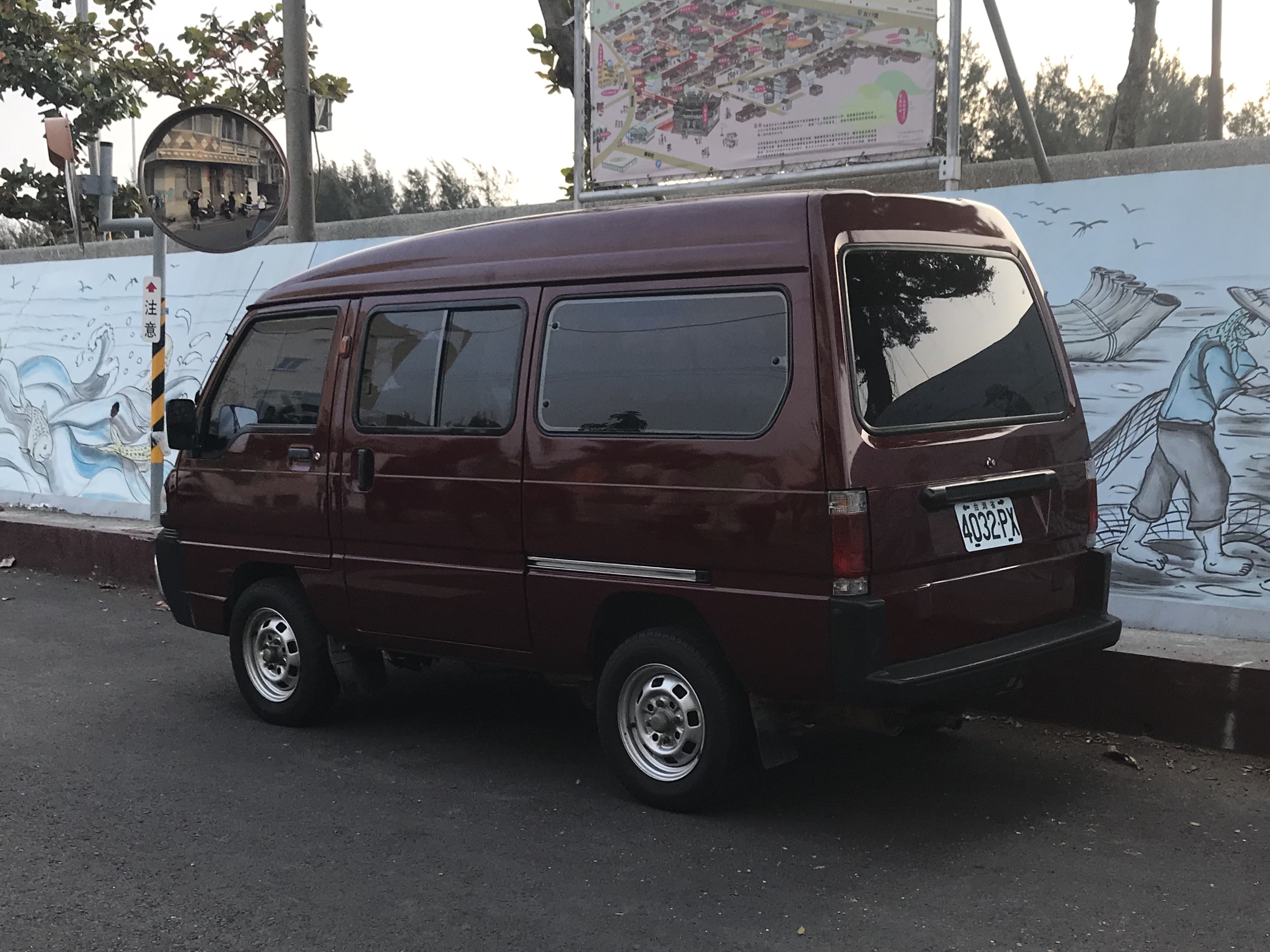
CMC Varica van (1989-1992)

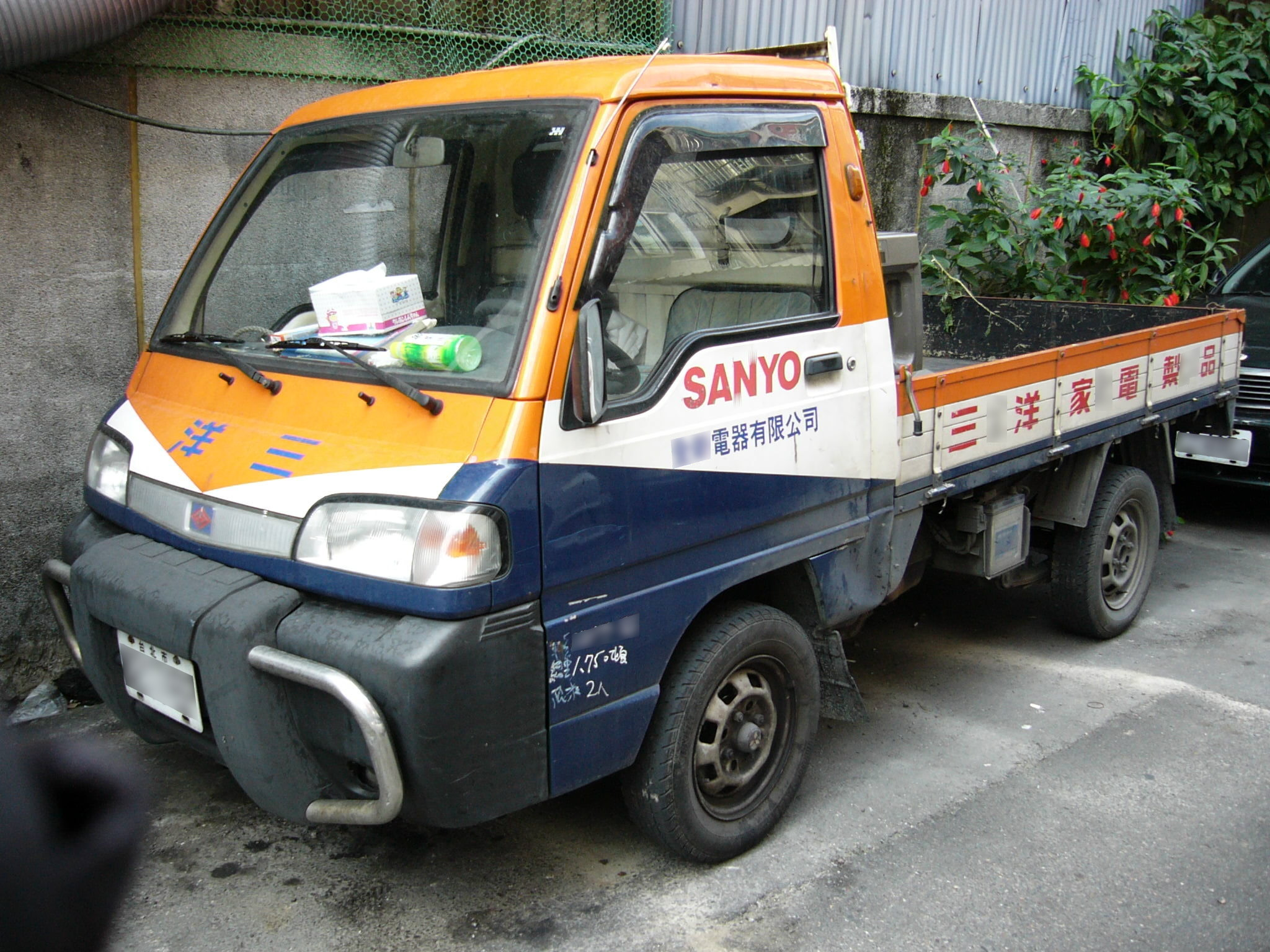
CMC Varica pickup truck (1998-2007)

1998, an extended facelift included a longer, more rounded nose design. A 1.2-litre engine replaced the smaller 1.1-litre. It was sold until 2007.

== CMC Veryca (2000-present) ==
CMC Veryca
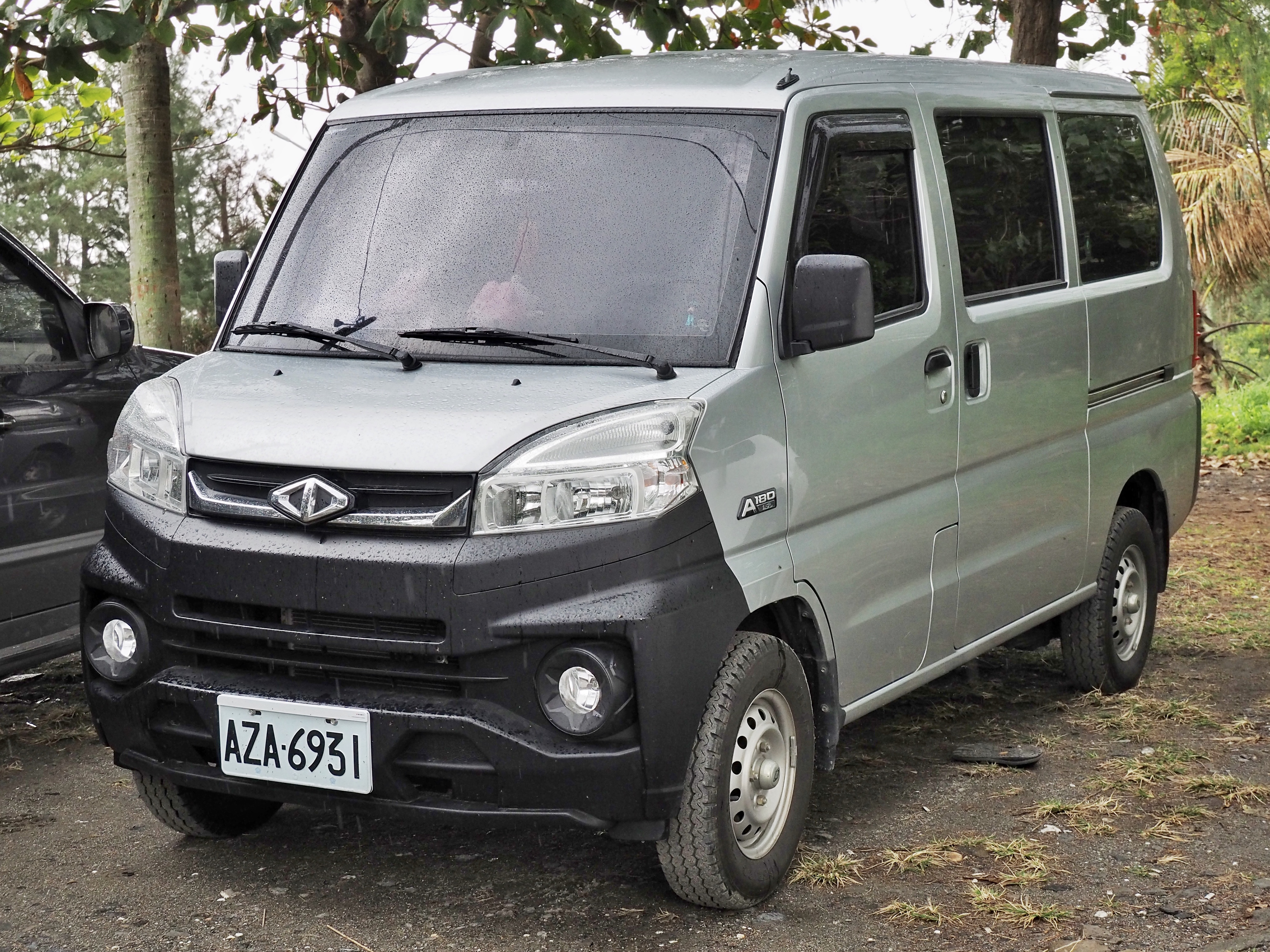
- CMC Veryca A180 van facelift

Overview
- Manufacturer: China Motor Corporation
- Also called: Soueast Veryca (China); Soueast C1 Xiwang (China); Vantage Primo (United States); Vantage Primo X (United States)
- Production: 2000–present

Body and chassis
- Body style: 5-door Van; 2-door Pickup truck/Flatbed truck
- Layout: FR layout, F4 layout
- Related: Cushman White Truck

Powertrain
- Engine: 1.3 L LJ474Q3E2 I4 (China); 1.3 L 4G13 I4; 1.5 L 4G15V I4
- Transmission: 5-speed manual 4-speed automatic

Dimensions
- Wheelbase: 2,610 mm (102.8 in)
- Length: Vans: 4,085 mm (160.8 in); Pickups: 3,265 mm (128.5 in)
- Width: 1,560 mm (61.4 in)
- Height: 1,960 mm (77.2 in)
- Curb weight: 1,022–1,217 kg (2,253.1–2,683.0 lb)

Chronology
- Successor: CMC J Space

In 2000, the succeeding product of the second generation Varica debuted. It was based on the sixth generation Mitsubishi Minicab Town Box Wide and was renamed to Veryca with the Chinese name changed to 菱利 (Líng Lì). The design was restyled by China Motor Corporation's own research and design center. The redesign extended the rear overhang and also changed the front and rear down road graphics.

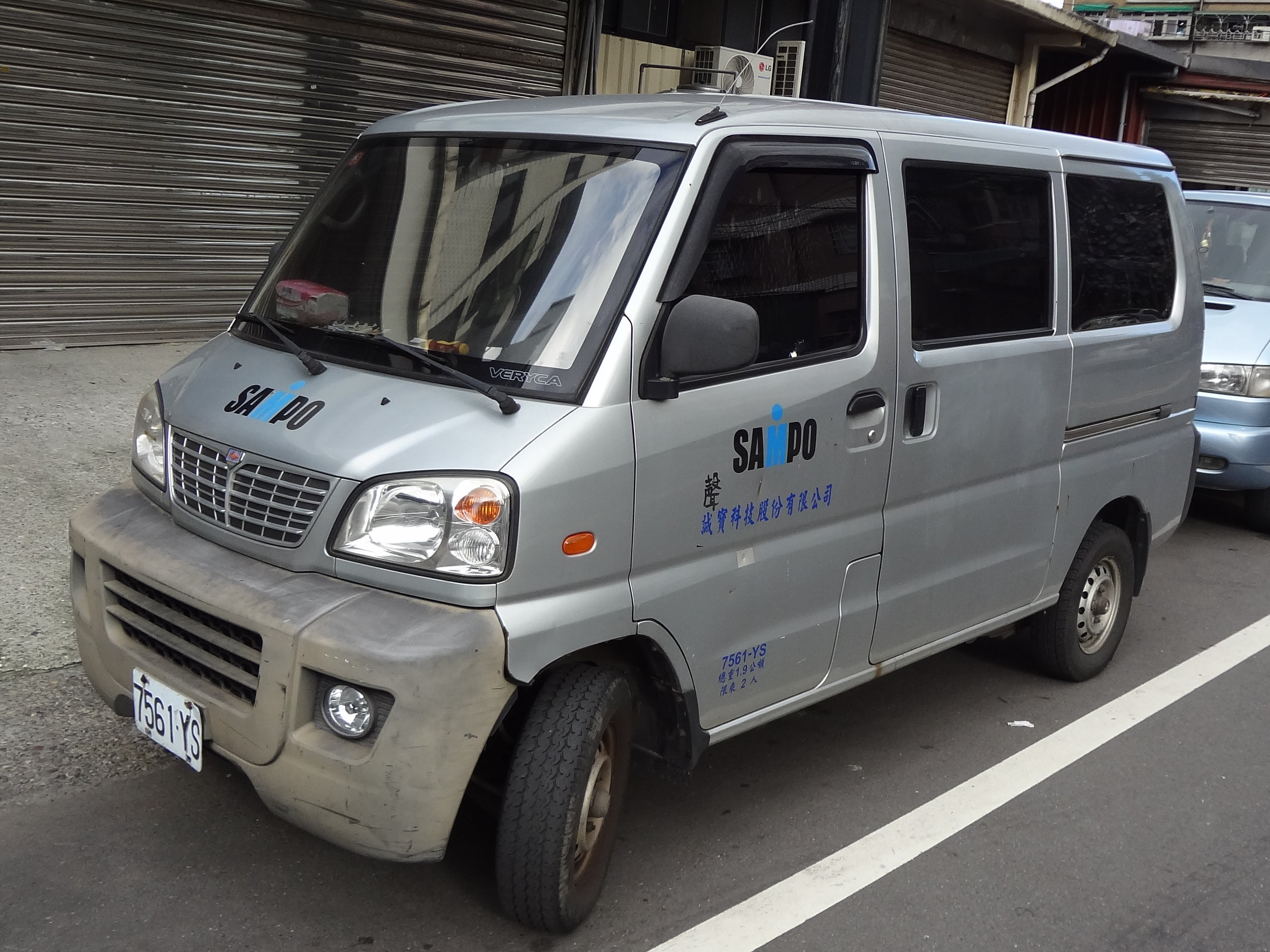
CMC Veryca van pre-facelift front view

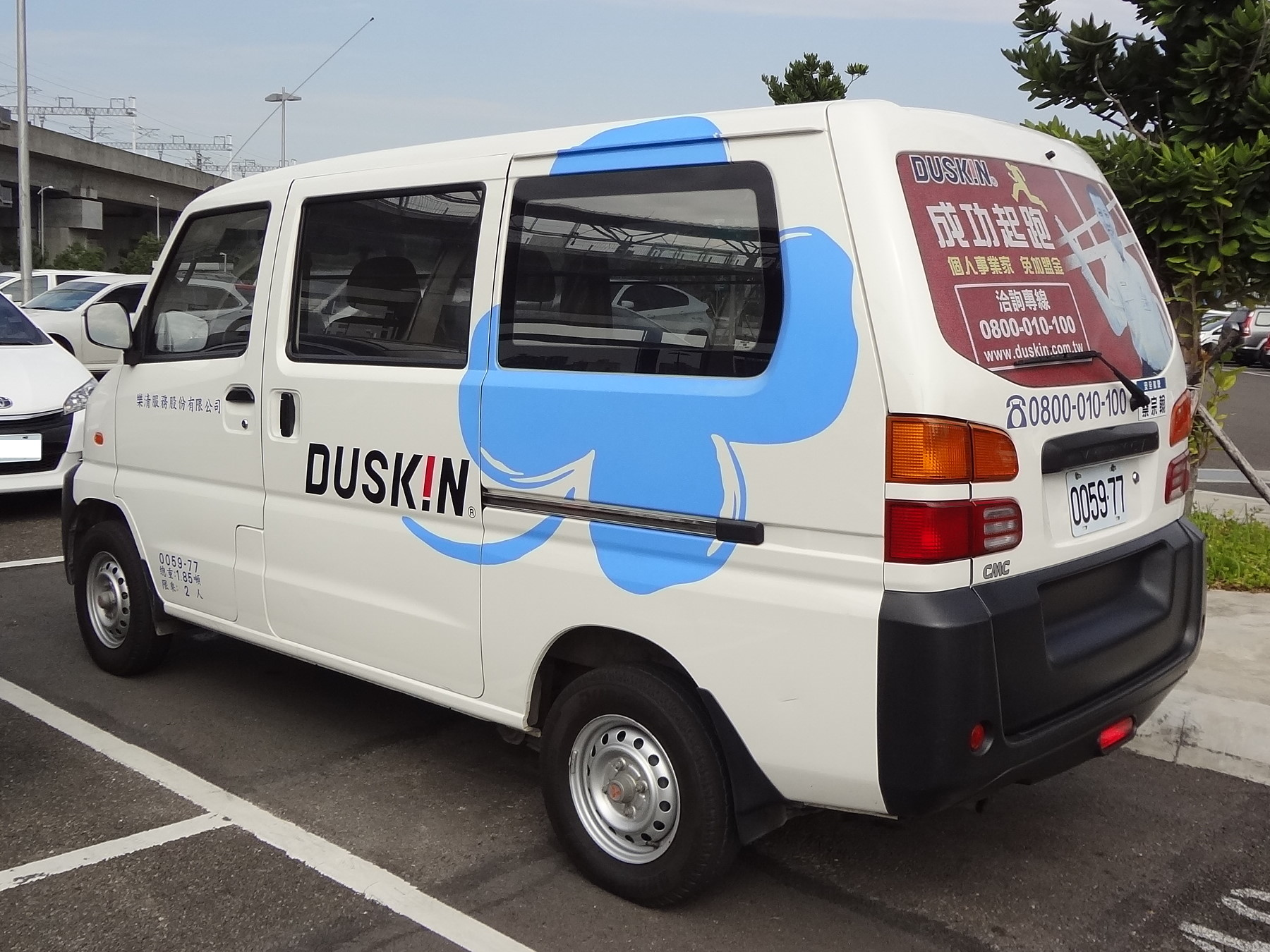
CMC Veryca van pre-facelift rear view

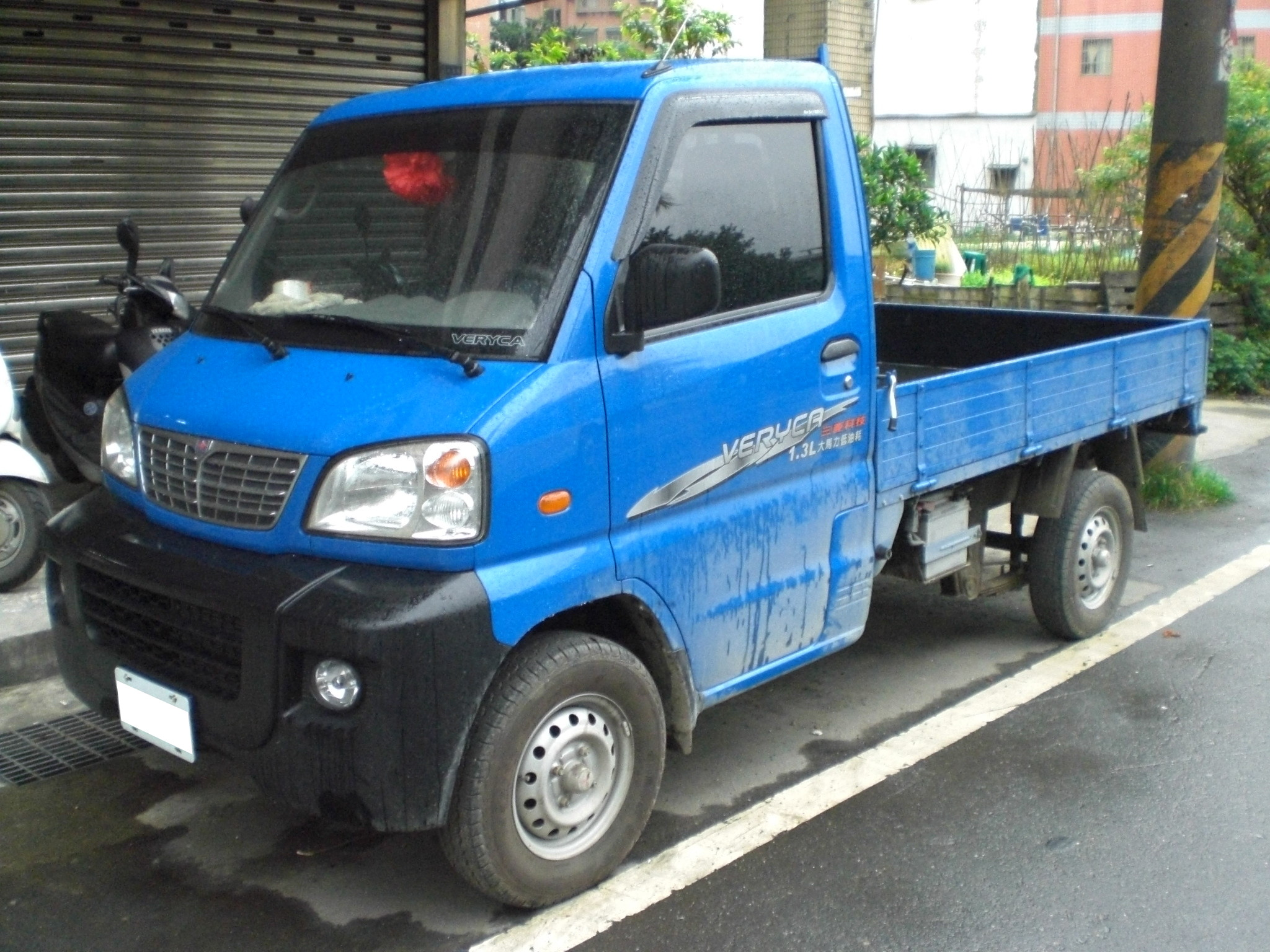
CMC Veryca pickup pre-facelift front view

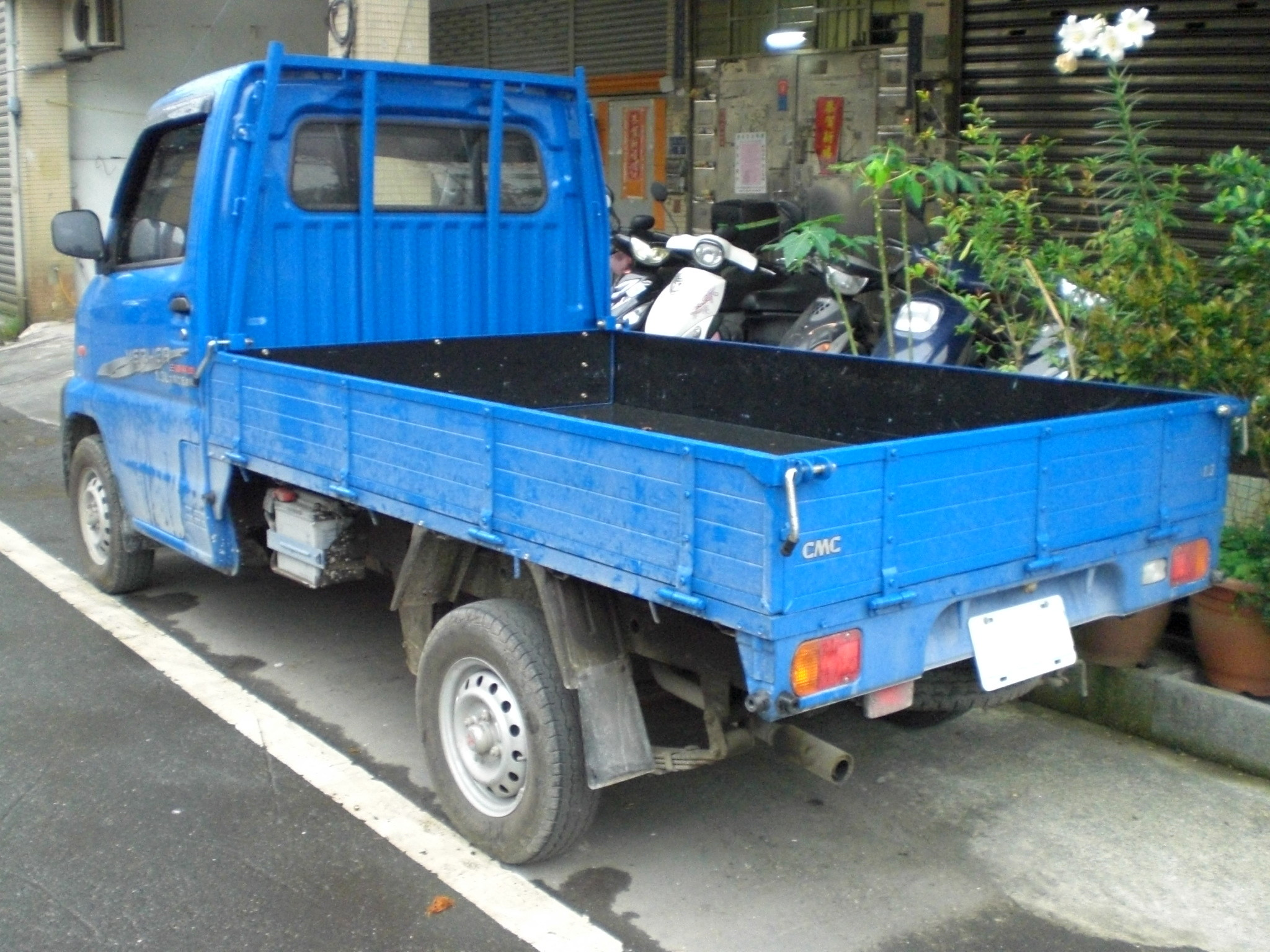
CMC Veryca pickup pre-facelift rear view

In 2001, a version called the CMC Veryca Magic was unveiled. The CMC Veryca Magic features wider wheel arches, a 1.6 liter engine, and was aiming towards the passenger vehicle market instead of the usual commercial vehicle market for the CMC Veryca.

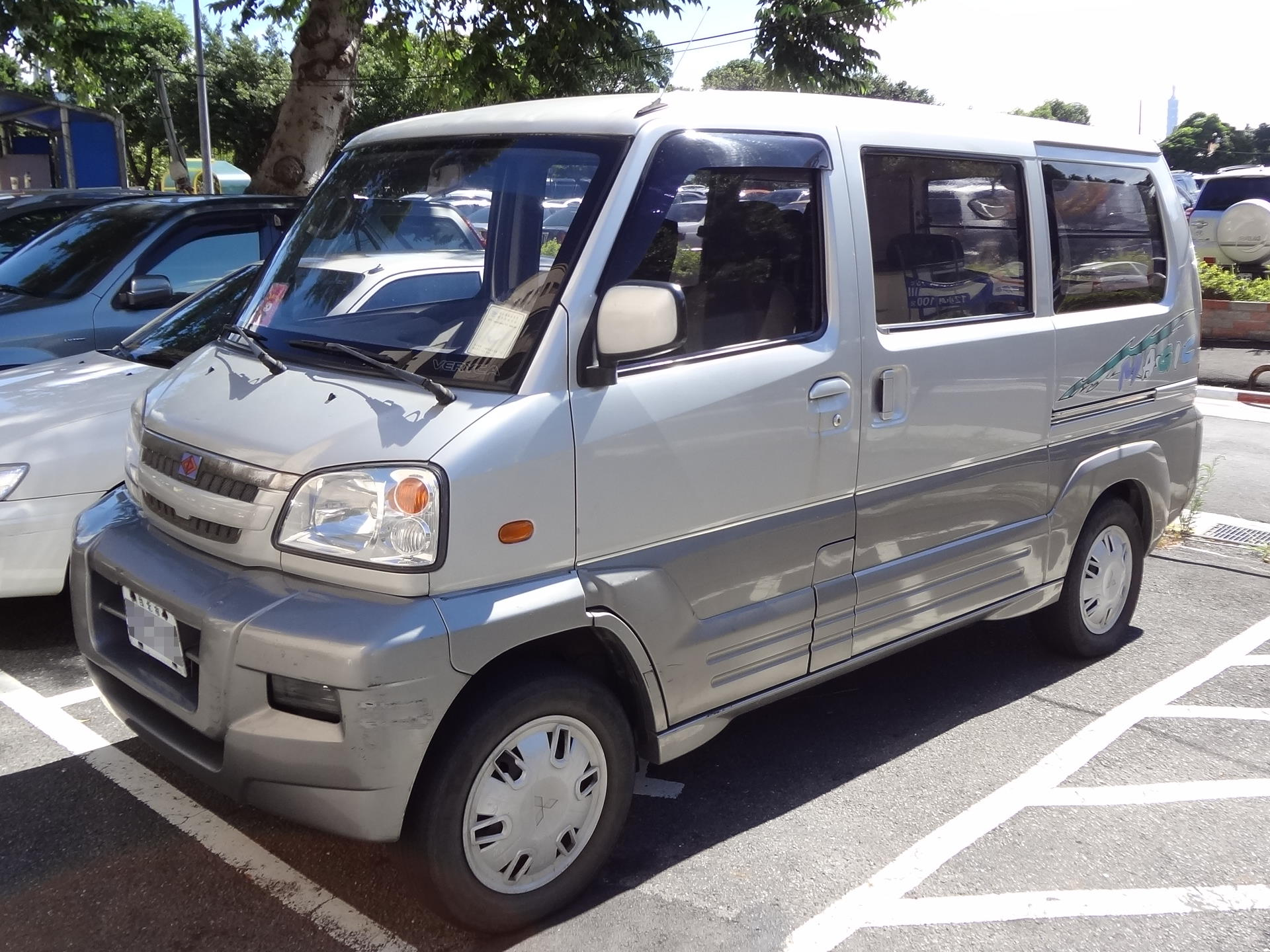
CMC Veryca Magic van pre-facelift front view

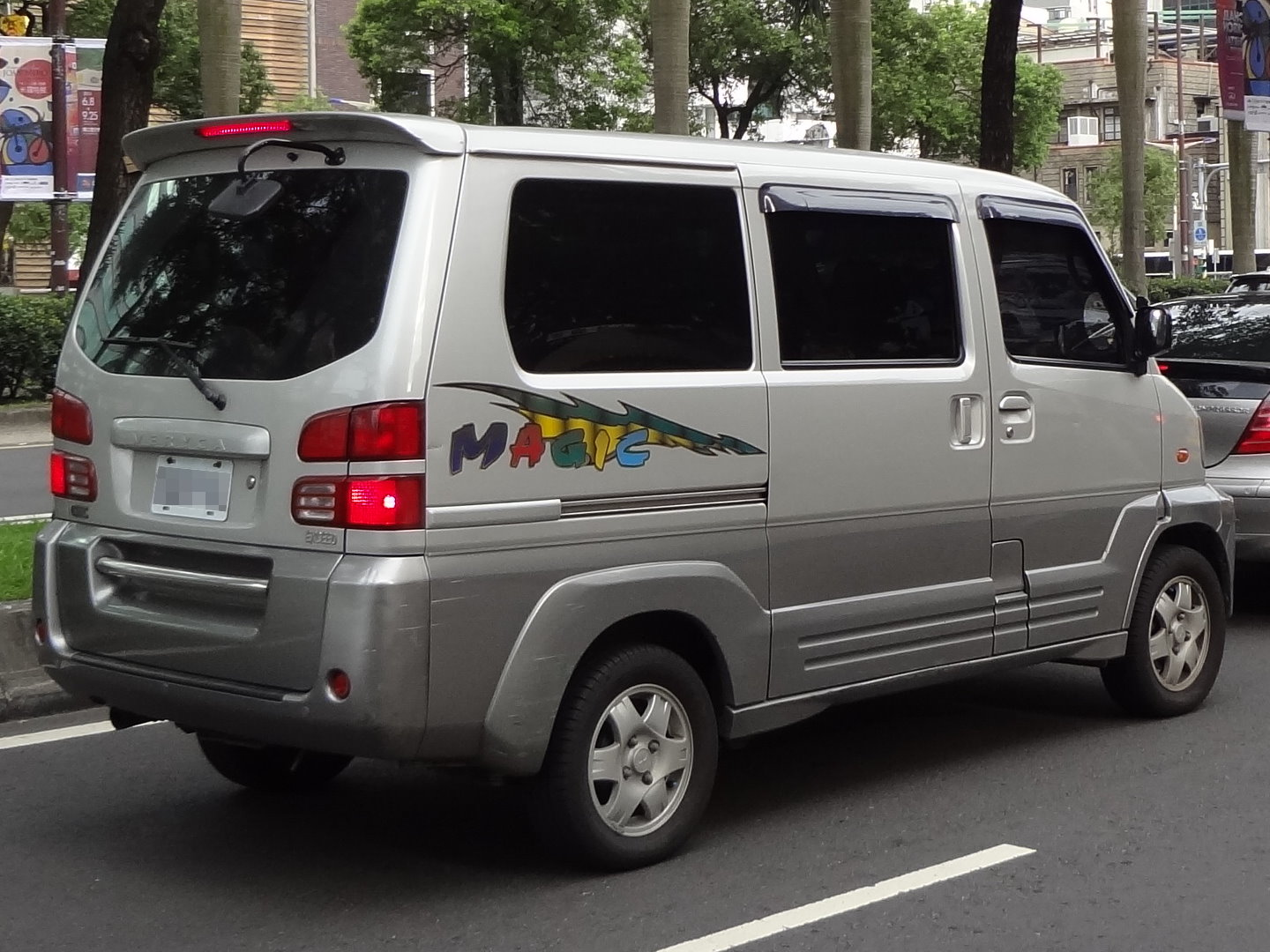
CMC Veryca Magic van pre-facelift rear view

In 2013, the CMC Veryca received a facelift featuring a restyled front fascia and a rear end from the 2010 Soueast C1 Xiwang.

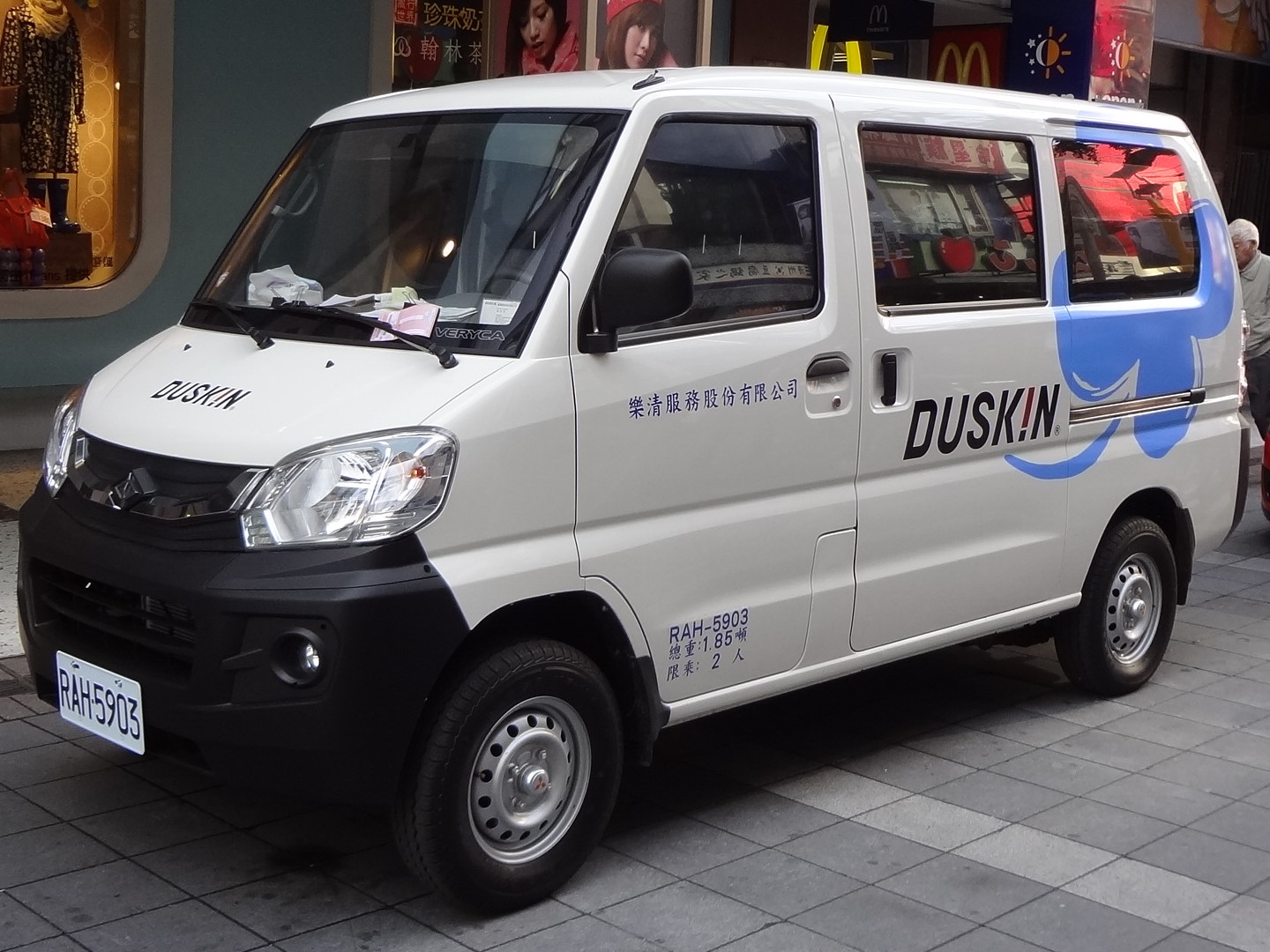
CMC Veryca first facelift van front view

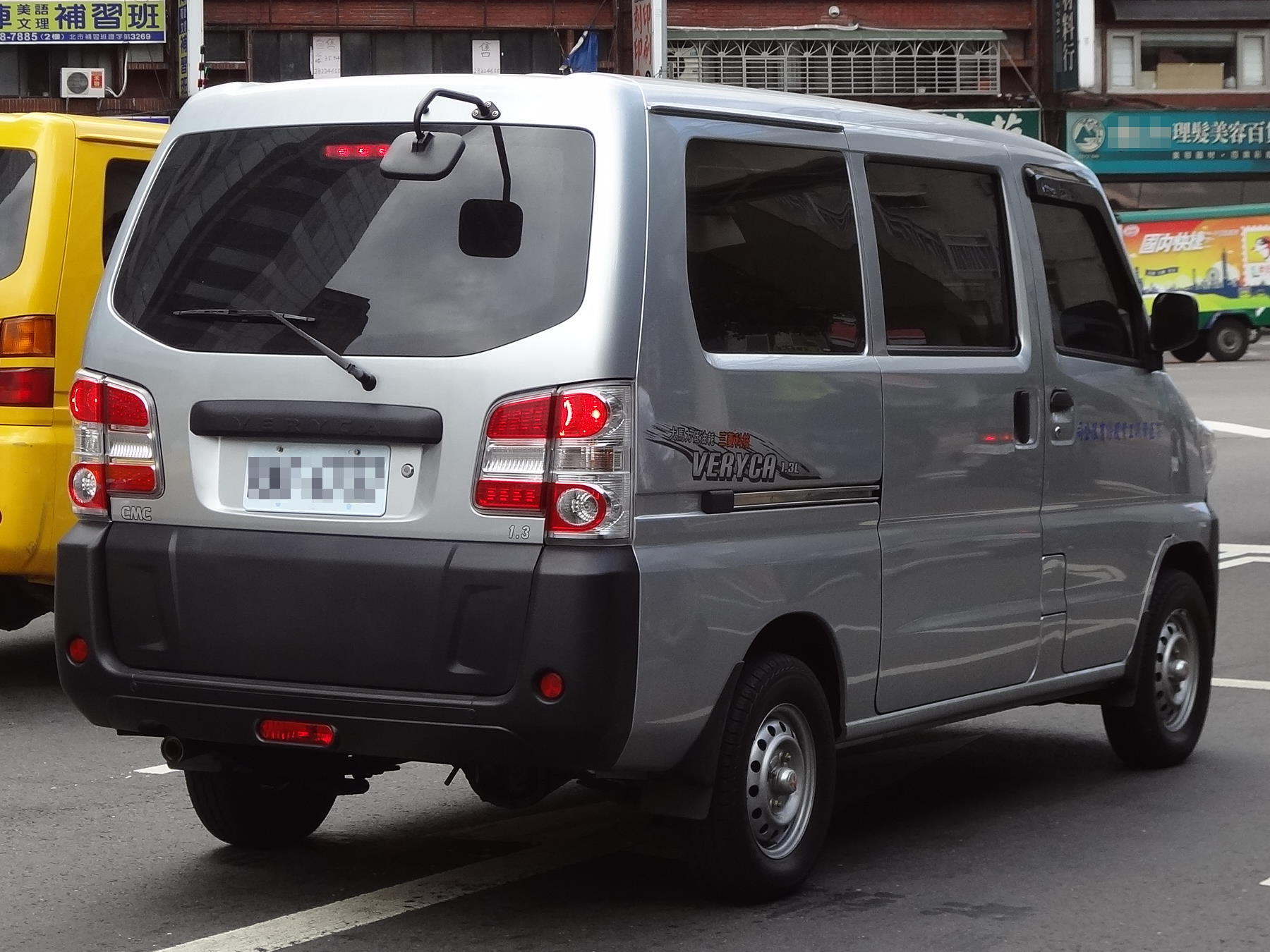
CMC Veryca first facelift van rear view

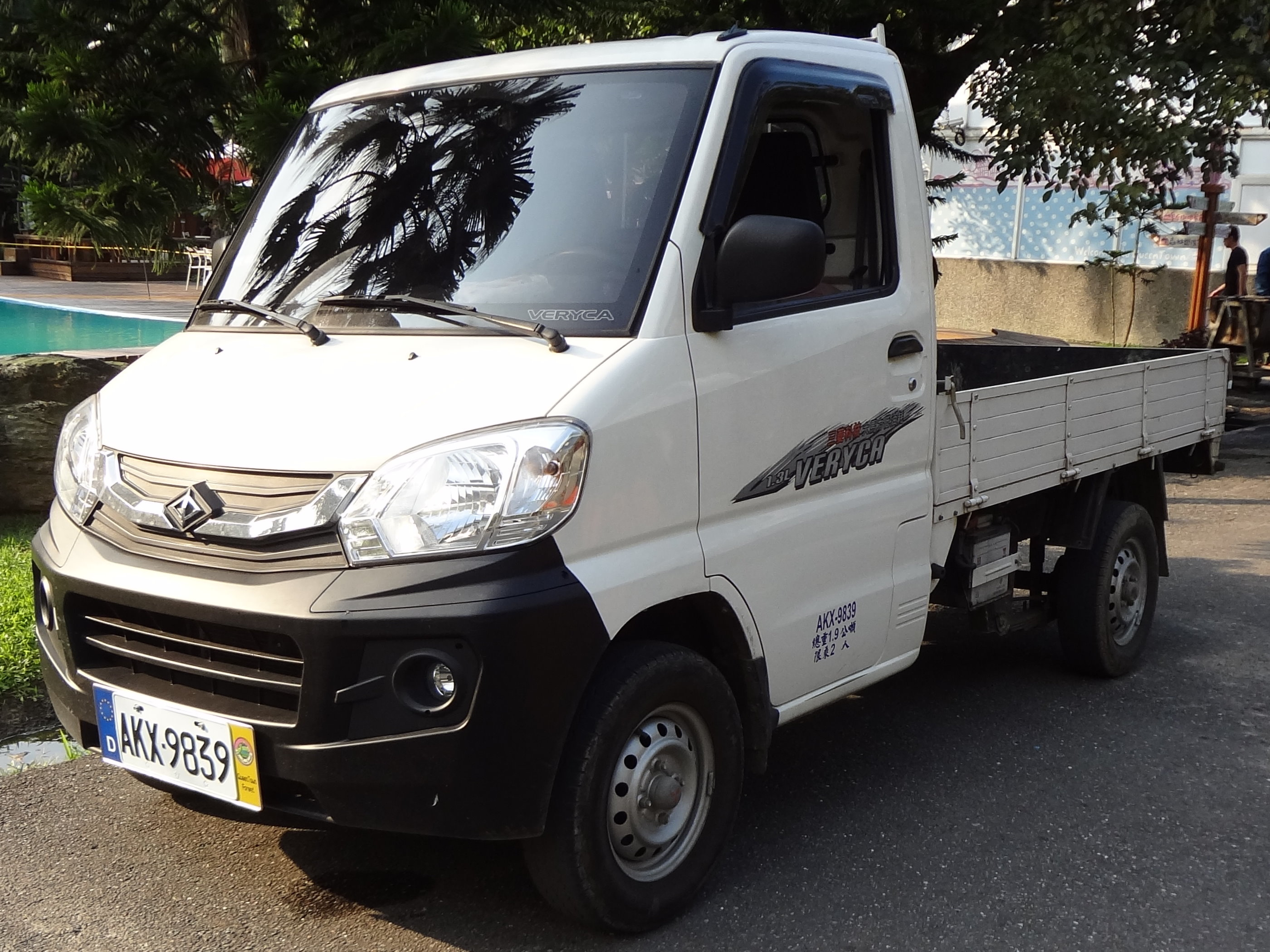
CMC Veryca first facelift pickup front view

In 2018, the CMC Veryca received another facelift, changing the front end and rear end designs while adding A180 for van models and A190 for pickup models.

In 2024, CMC debured the successor model J Space, but some models, such as the A190, continued to be sold.

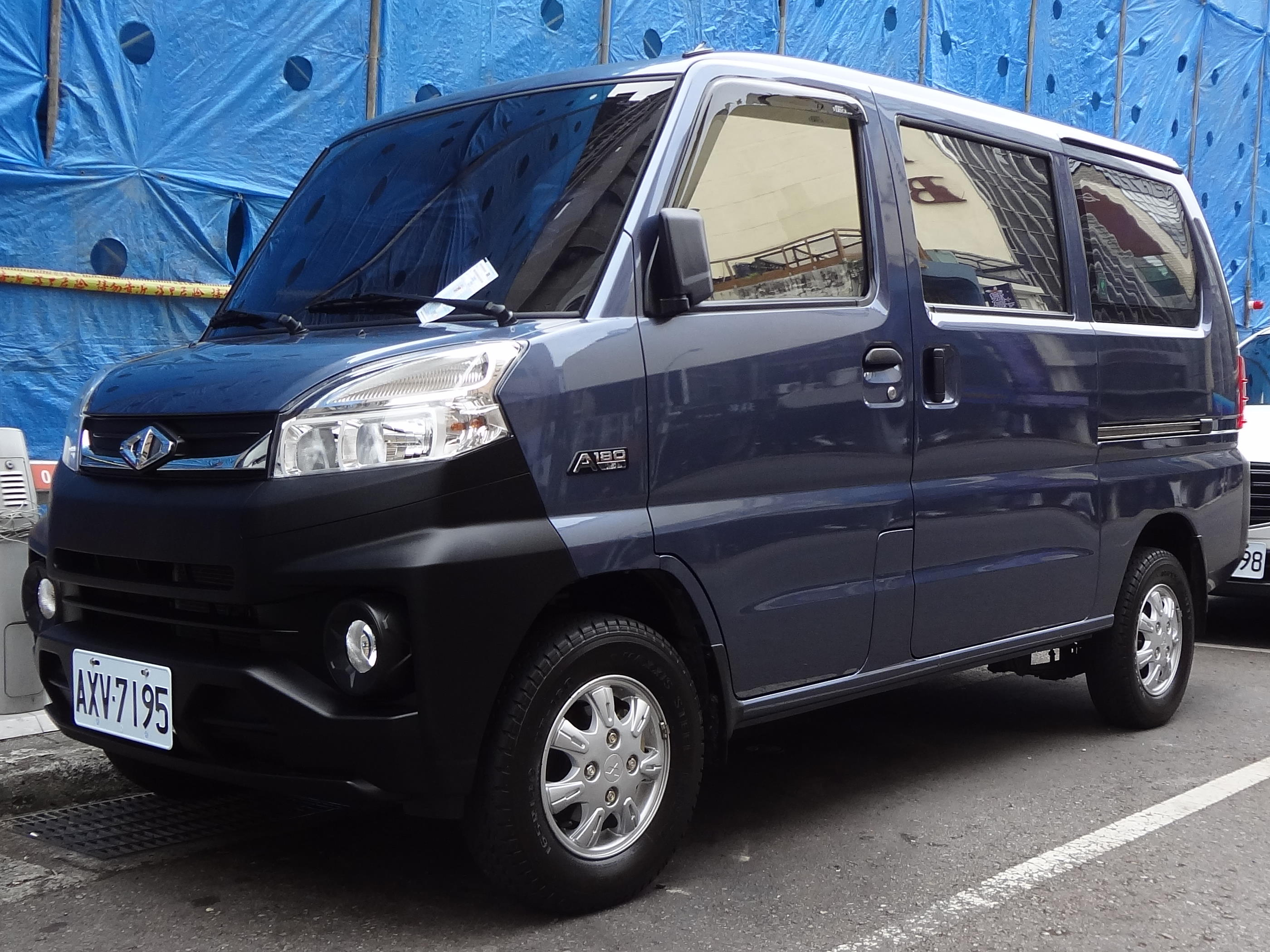
CMC Veryca second facelift van front view

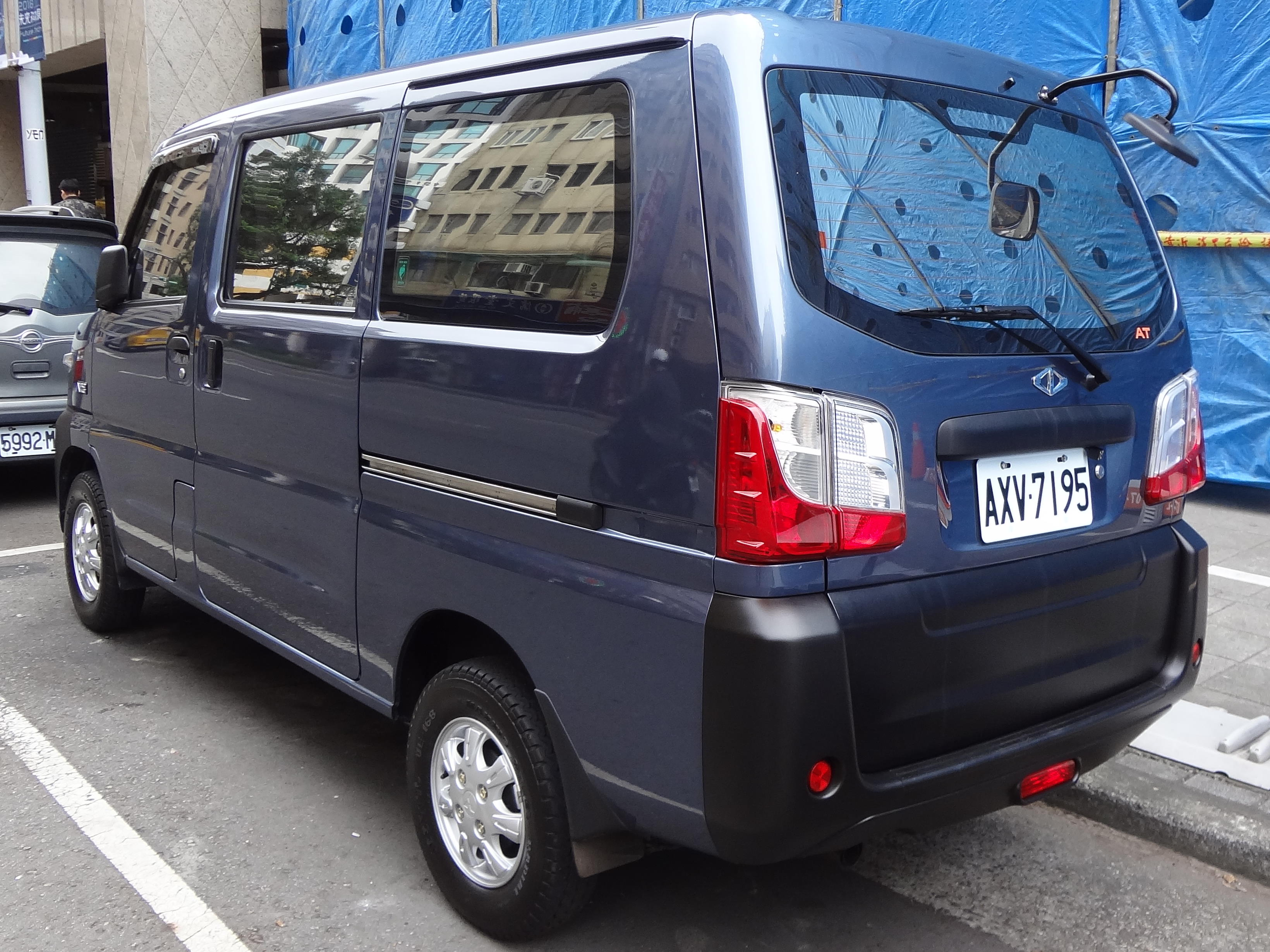
CMC Veryca second facelift van rear view

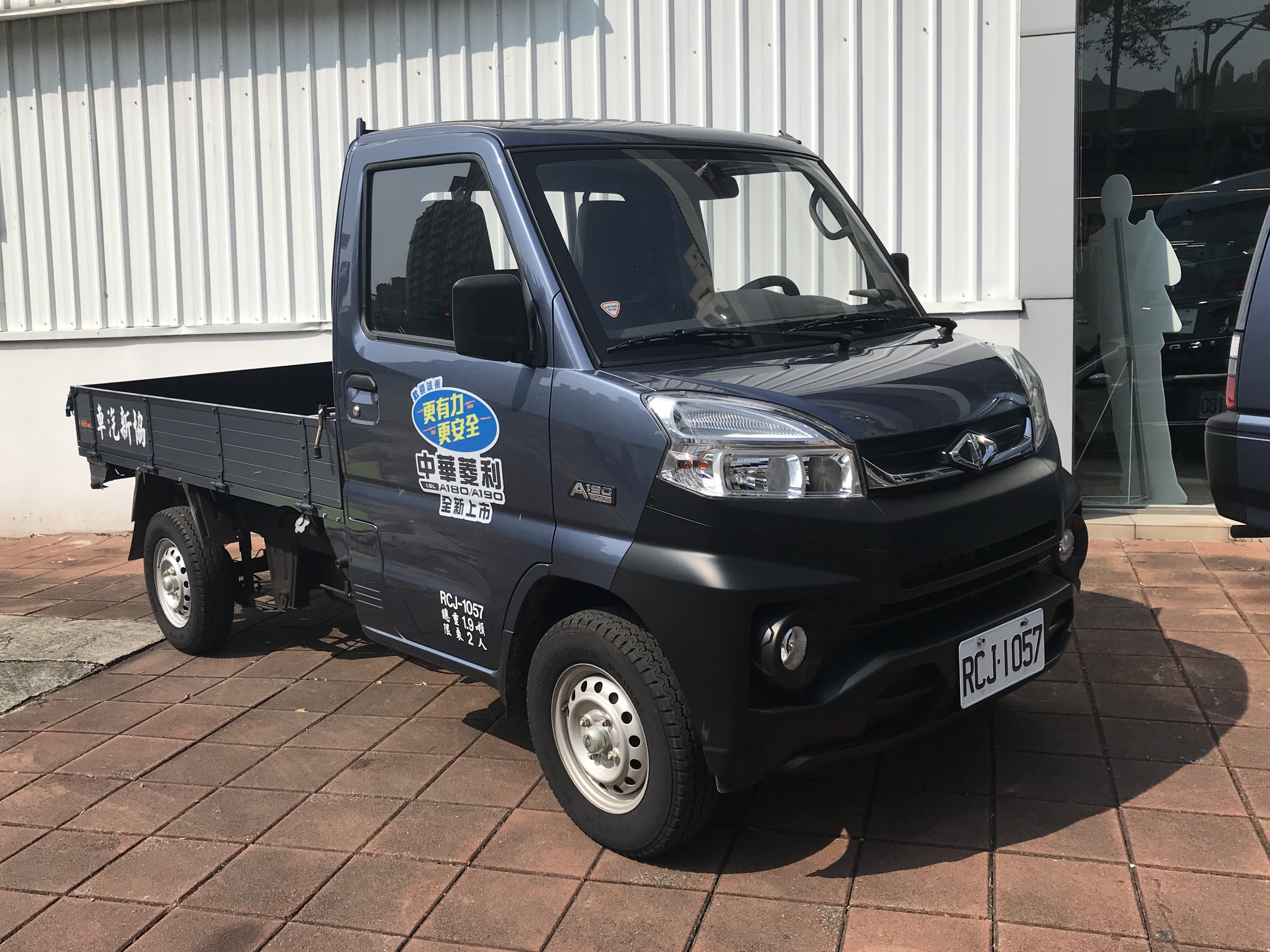
CMC Veryca second facelift pickup front view

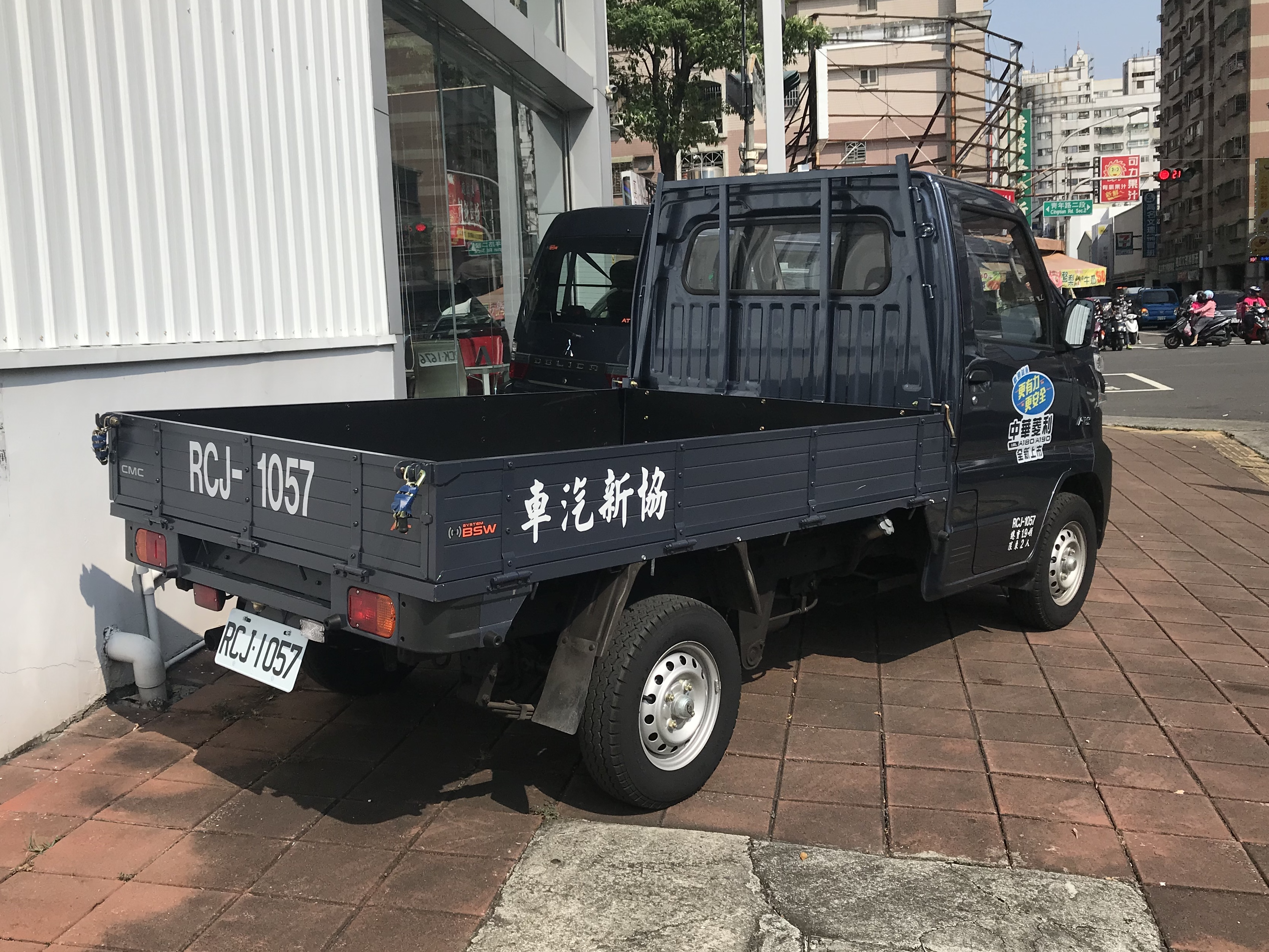
CMC Veryca second facelift pickup rear view

=== Electric variants ===
The CMC Veryca was also available as an electric vehicle called the e-Veryca, or from 2023, the E300. The E300 has a NEDC range of 298 km for the 5-seater van bodystyle, 309 km for the 2-seater chassis cab truck bodystyle, 326 km for the pickup bodystyle. The maximum power output is 129 hp and the torque is 22.4 kgm. Top speed is 100 km/h.

=== Soueast Veryca and Soueast Xiwang C1 ===
The Soueast Veryca was a result of the partnership between China Motor Corporation and Soueast Motors. The Soueast Veryca was essentially a rebadged CMC Veryca for the Chinese market. A facelift was revealed later, and was renamed to Soueast Xiwang C1. The Xiwang made its debut during the 2010 Guangzhou Auto Show and commenced production in 2011. Soueast Xiwang C1 engine options include a Soueast 1.3-liter engine producing 82 hp and 102 nm of torque and a Mitsubishi-sourced 1.3-liter engine producing 92 hp and 114 nm of torque. Both engines are mated to a 5-speed manual gear box. Prices ranges from 36,800 yuan to 46,800 yuan.

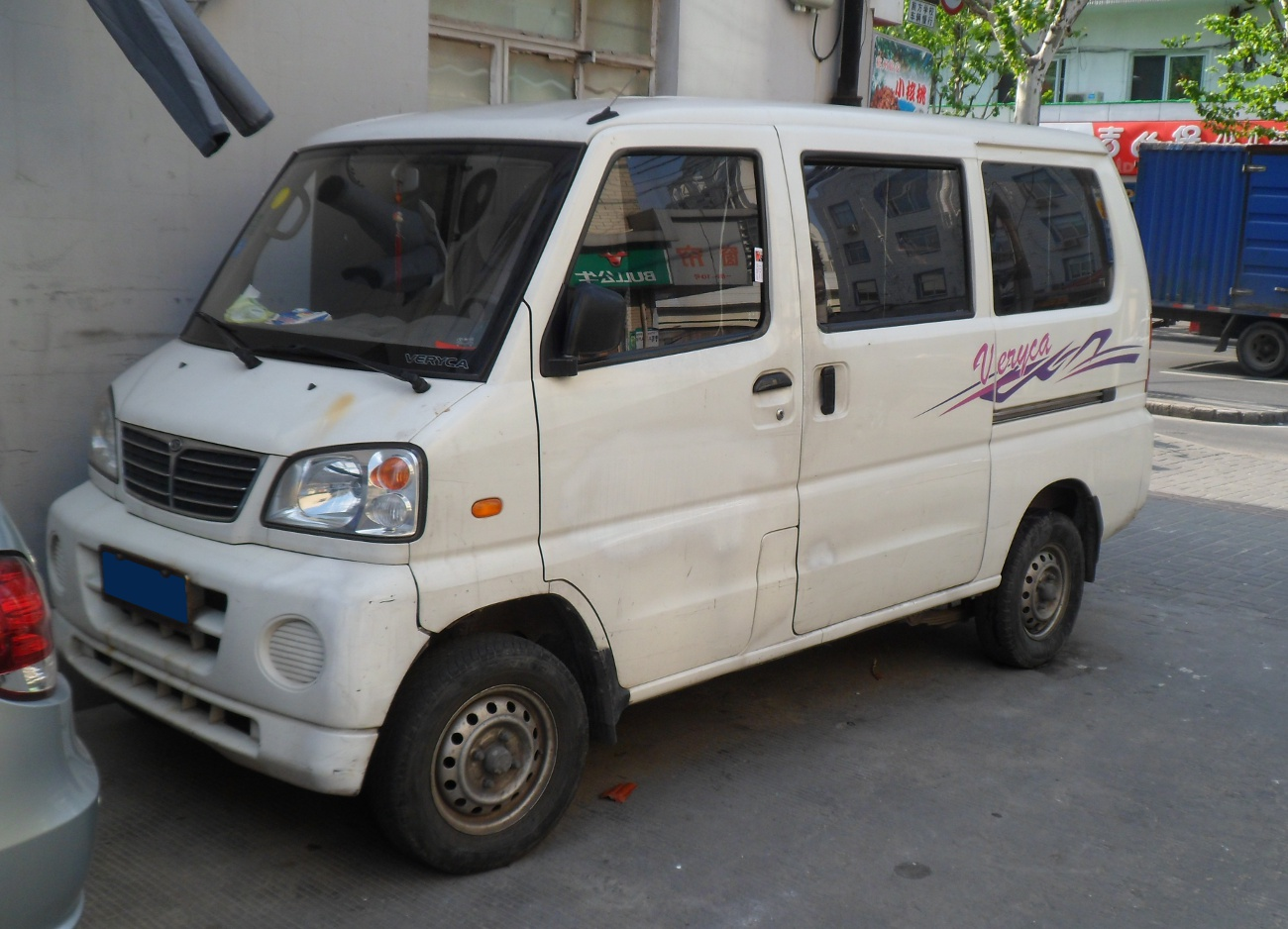
Soueast Veryca

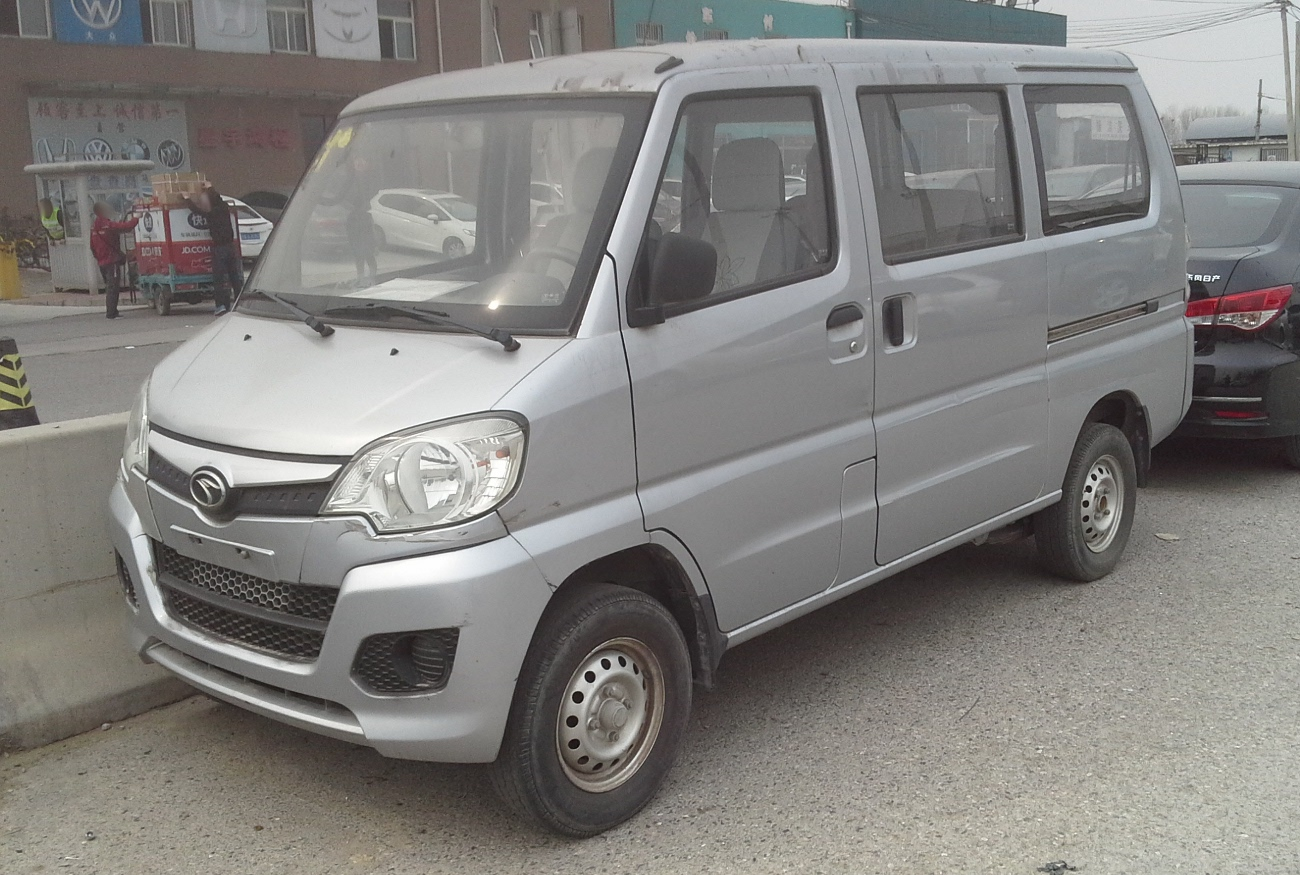
Soueast Xiwang C1 front view

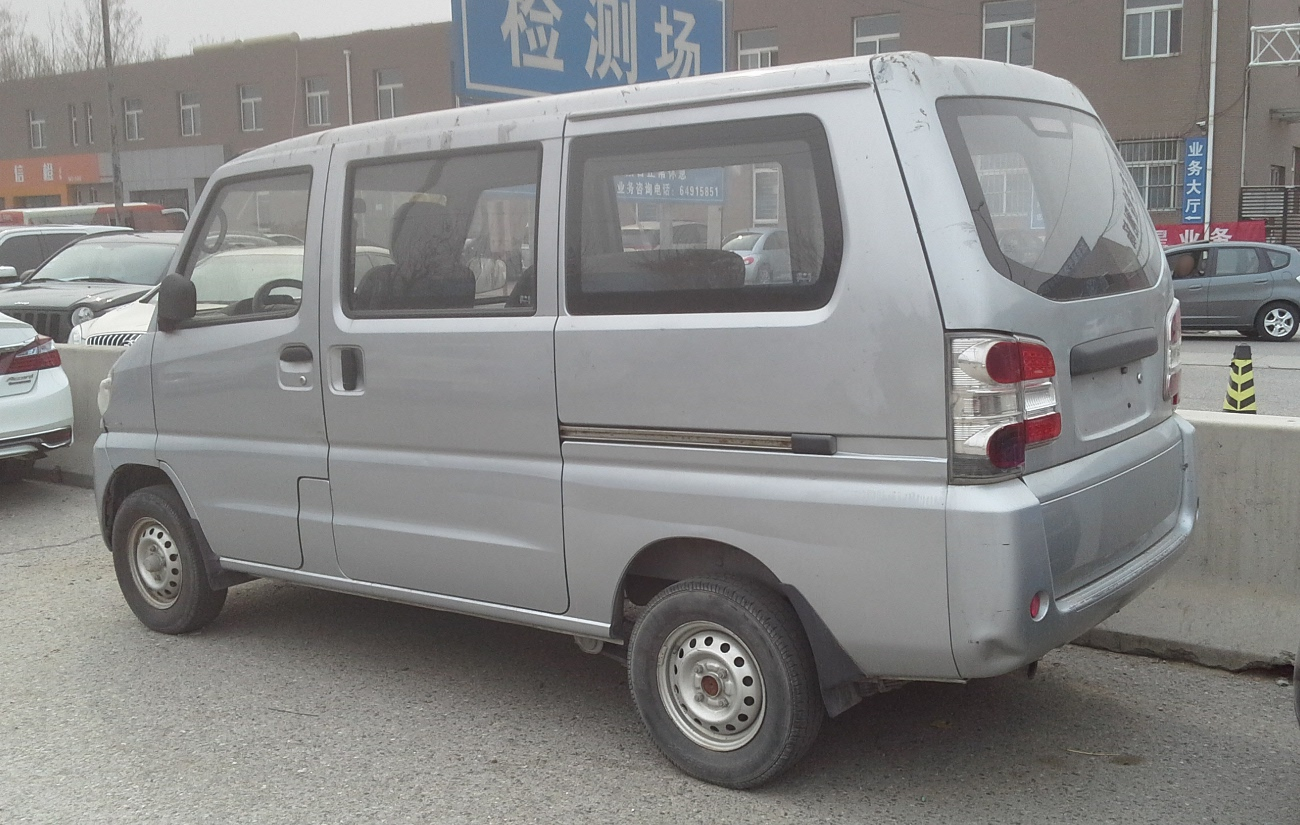
Soueast Xiwang C1 rear view
