= SCV =

SCV is the Latin abbreviation for the Vatican City State (Latin: Status Civitatis Vaticanae).

SCV may also refer to:

== Companies and organizations ==
- Santa Clara Vanguard Drum and Bugle Corps, California, US
- Sodalitium Christianae Vitae, defunct male Catholic society based in Peru
- Sons of Confederate Veterans, neo-confederate non-profit based in the US
- Singapore Cable Vision, the former name of StarHub TV, a Singaporean pay TV provider

== Transportation ==
- Vehicle registration plates of Vatican City
- Small Commercial Vehicle, a vehicle segment in India
- Suceava International Airport (IATA code),
- Special Category Visa, for New Zealanders in Australia
- Vatican City international postal code, SCV-00120

== Other uses ==
- Santa Clarita Valley, California, US
- Function of several complex variables, This field of mathematics is called several complex variables and is often abbreviated as SCV
- Squared coefficient of variation in statistics
