= Kesoram Industries =

Indian industrial company

- Company type: Public
- Traded as: BSE: 502937; NSE: KESORAMIND
- Founded: 1919; 107 years ago
- Headquarters: Kolkata, India
- Products: Tyres; cement; rayon
- Operating income: ▲₹4,035 crore (US$420 million) (2024)
- Net income: ▲₹−385 crore (US$−40 million) (2024)
- Website: www.kesocorp.com
- Footnotes / references Financials as of March 31, 2024.

Kesoram Industries Limited is an Indian industrial company which produces rayon and related products such as viscose rayon and filament yarn. It was once part of the BK Birla Group.

== History ==
Kesoram Industries Limited started its business as Kesoram Cotton Mills in 1919. After a partnership, the first rayon plant was built in 1959 under the name Kesoram Rayon. Shortly after the plant was built, the company also started the production of tires and cement under the brand name Birla Tyres and Birla Shakti Cement respectively. In 1986, another cement plant, known as Vasavadatta Cement, was commissioned by it at Sedam, Gulbarga district, Karnataka. The name of the company was changed to Kesoram Industries Limited on 9 July 1986. Since then, Kesoram Industries listed on four stock exchanges: the National Stock Exchange of India, the Bombay Stock Exchange, the Calcutta Stock Exchange, and the Bourse de Luxembourg.

Kesoram Industries entered into a joint venture with Maharashtra Seamless Limited and Dhariwal Infrastructure Private Limited in 2012 for working a coal block allocated to it by the Central Government in Maharashtra.

During 2014–15, the company sold a tyre plant to JK Tyres. In 2018, Kesoram Industries demerged its tire manufacturing business Birla Tyres, as part of a debt reduction plan. Birla Tyres later filed for insolvency and was taken over by a consortium led by Himadri Speciality Chemicals and Dalmia Bharat Refractories.

In 2019, after the death of Basant Kumar Birla, his daughter Manjushree Khaitan became the chairperson of Kesoram Industries. In 2024, Khaitan died after a brief illness.

In 2023, Kesoram Industries announced that it would demerge and sell its 10.75 MTPA cement business to UltraTech Cement for ₹5,379 crore (US$560 million) in an all-stock deal. The sale is expected to complete by the end of 2024, leaving Kesoram Industries with its rayon and transparent paper packaging businesses held by its subsidiary Cygnet Industries.

== Business ==
Kesoram Industries Limited has one major division:

=== Present business ===
- Kesoram Rayon - Established in 1959, Kesoram Rayon is a viscose rayon filament yarn and cellophane paper manufacturing unit. Situated on the banks of the Ganges, the factory has over 2,700 employees and 52 spinning machines, with an installed capacity of 6,500 MT per annum.

=== Former businesses ===
- Birla Tyres - Birla Tyres was first established in 1991 as part of Kesoram Industries Limited. It later collaborated with tyre manufacturer Pirelli in the production and development of its tyres.
- Birla Shakti Cement - Under the cement division of Kesoram Industries Limited, Birla Shakti manufactured and sold cement. The division operated two cement manufacturing plants located at Sedam, Karnataka (the Vasavadatta Cement Plant) and Basantnagar, near Ramagundam in Telangana (the Kesoram Cement Plant).

== Recent developments ==
In December 2025, the Birla family exited Kesoram Industries following the sale of their promoter stake to Frontier Warehousing Limited.
