= Mahindra Gio =

Indian light commercial vehicle

Overview
- Manufacturer: Mahindra & Mahindra
- Production: 2009–2015

Body and chassis
- Class: Mini truck
- Body style: 2-door pickup

Powertrain
- Transmission: 4-speed manual

Dimensions
- Wheelbase: 2,005 mm (78.9 in)
- Length: 3,180 mm (125.2 in)
- Width: 1,460 mm (57.5 in)
- Height: 1,820 mm (71.7 in)
- Curb weight: 1,110 kg (2,450 lb)

Chronology
- Successor: Mahindra Jeeto

The Mahindra Gio is a mini truck produced by the Indian vehicle manufacturer Mahindra from 2009 to 2015.

== Overview ==
The Gio went on sale in October 2009 with a starting price of ₹1.65 lakh. At the time of its launch, it was described as the Tata Nano of its kind. The Gio was discontinued in June 2015, having been replaced by the Mahindra Jeeto.
