= CMC J Space =

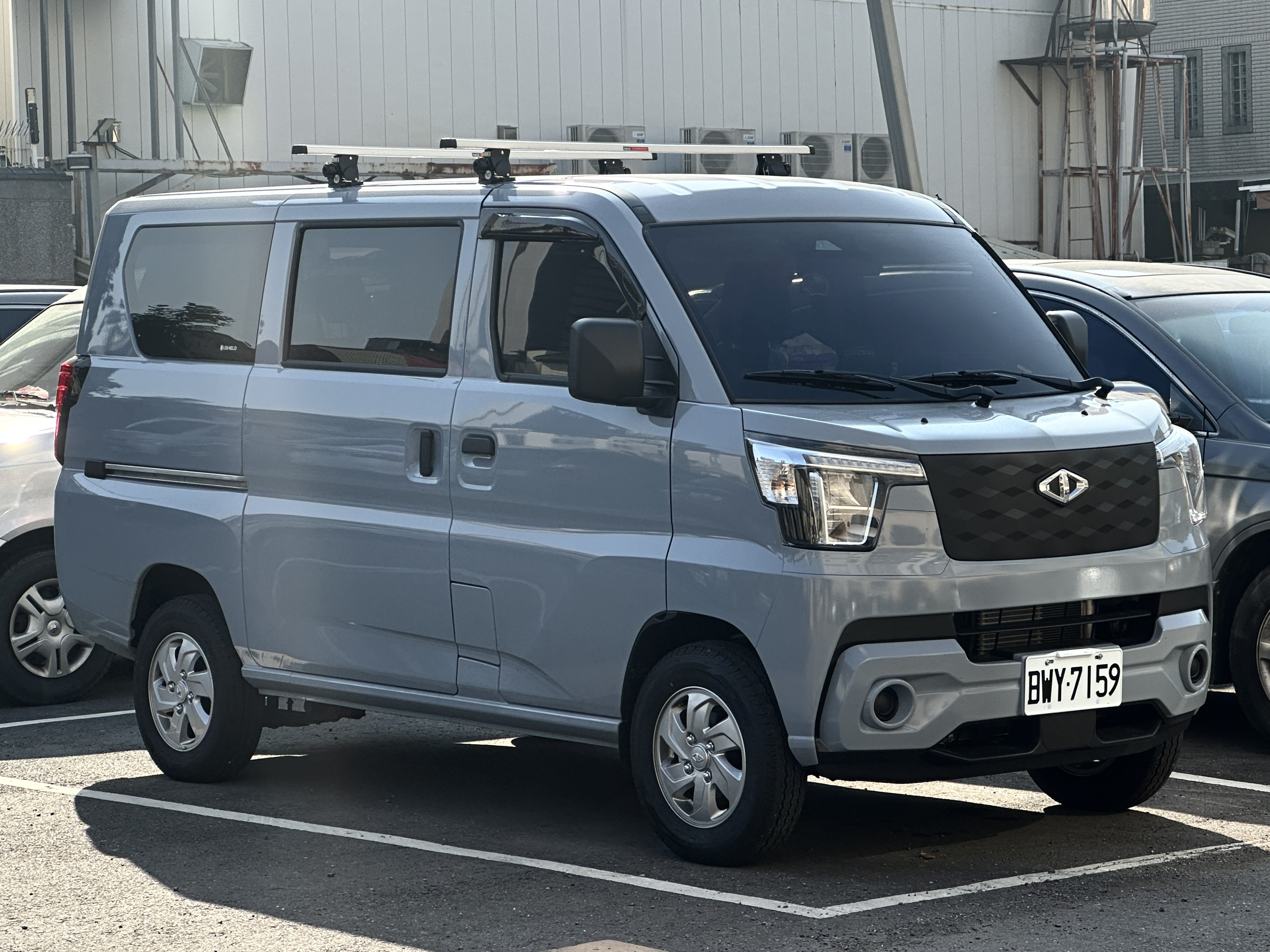
- CMC J Space van

Overview
- Manufacturer: China Motor Corporation
- Production: 2024–present
- Assembly: Taiwan: Taoyuan

Body and chassis
- Class: Microvan; Kei truck
- Body style: Van; Pickup truck; Chassis cab
- Layout: FR layout, F4 layout
- Related: CMC Veryca

Powertrain
- Engine: 1.5 L I4
- Transmission: 8-speed automatic

Dimensions
- Wheelbase: 2,610 mm (102.8 in)
- Length: Vans: 4,165 mm (164.0 in); Pickups: 4,285 mm (168.7 in); Chassis cab: 4,250 mm (167.3 in)
- Width: Vans: 1,685 mm (66.3 in); Pickups: 1,720 mm (67.7 in); Chassis cab: 1,680 mm (66.1 in)
- Height: Vans: 1,955 mm (77.0 in); Pickups: 1,975 mm (77.8 in); Chassis cab: 1,930 mm (76.0 in)

Chronology
- Predecessor: CMC Veryca

The CMC J Space is a light commercial vehicle (microvans and microtrucks) produced and sold by the Taiwanese automaker CMC since late 2024. According to CMC, The J Space name is inspired by the multiple meanings of the letter J. Including the meaning of Jumbo, Journey, and Joy.

== Overview ==
Developed by CMC to replace the aging Veryca light commercial vehicle series, the J Space is available as a 2 to 8 seater van, a single cab truck with either a wooden bed or as a chassis cab with an aluminum frame. The J Space features level 2 advanced driver-assistance systems (ADAS) including ACC and LKA with the powertrain consisting of a 1.5 liter (1,498cc) engine developing a maximum output of 107hp (78.7kW) at 6,000rpm mated to a 8-speed automatic transmission.

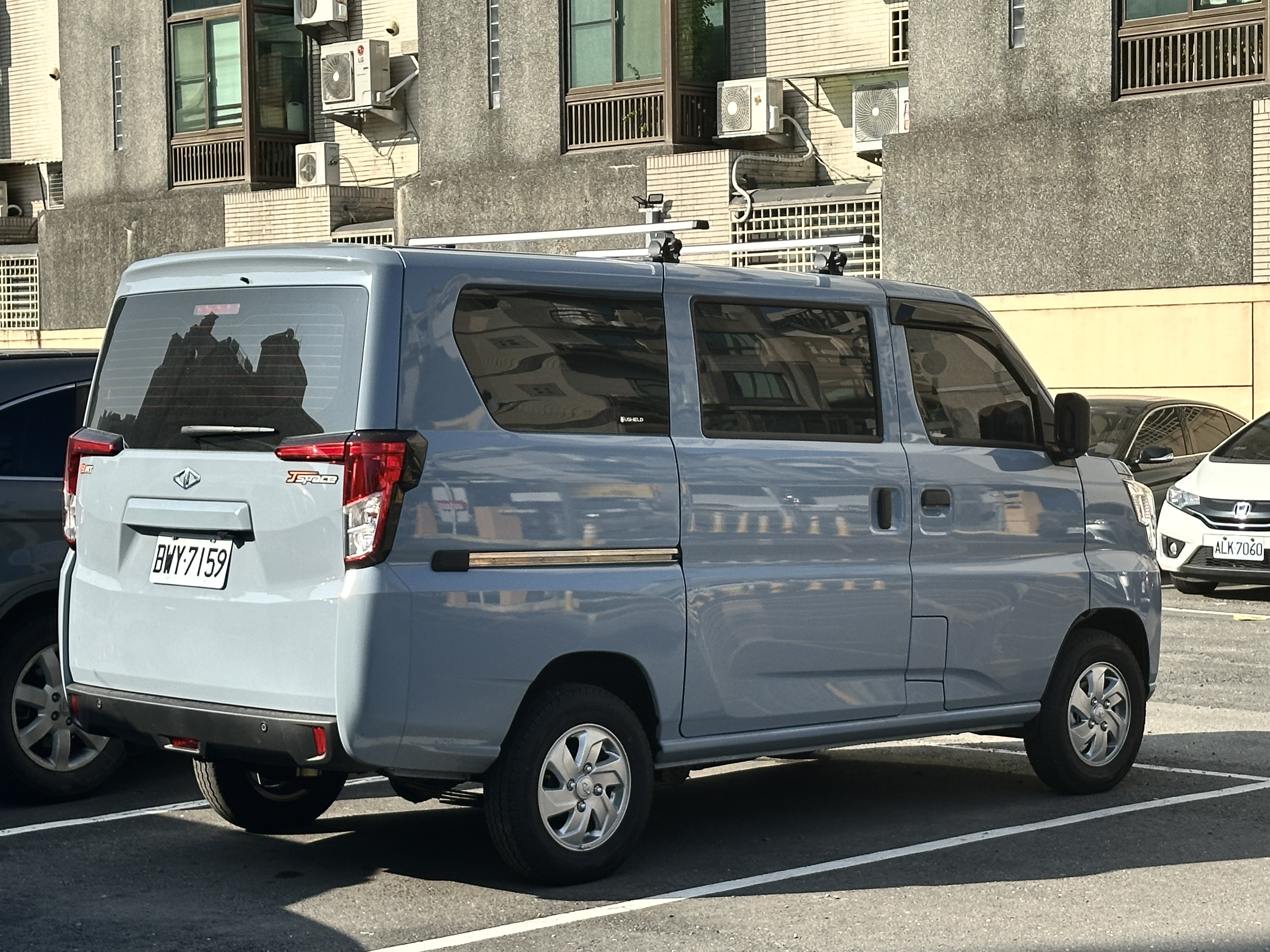
Rear view

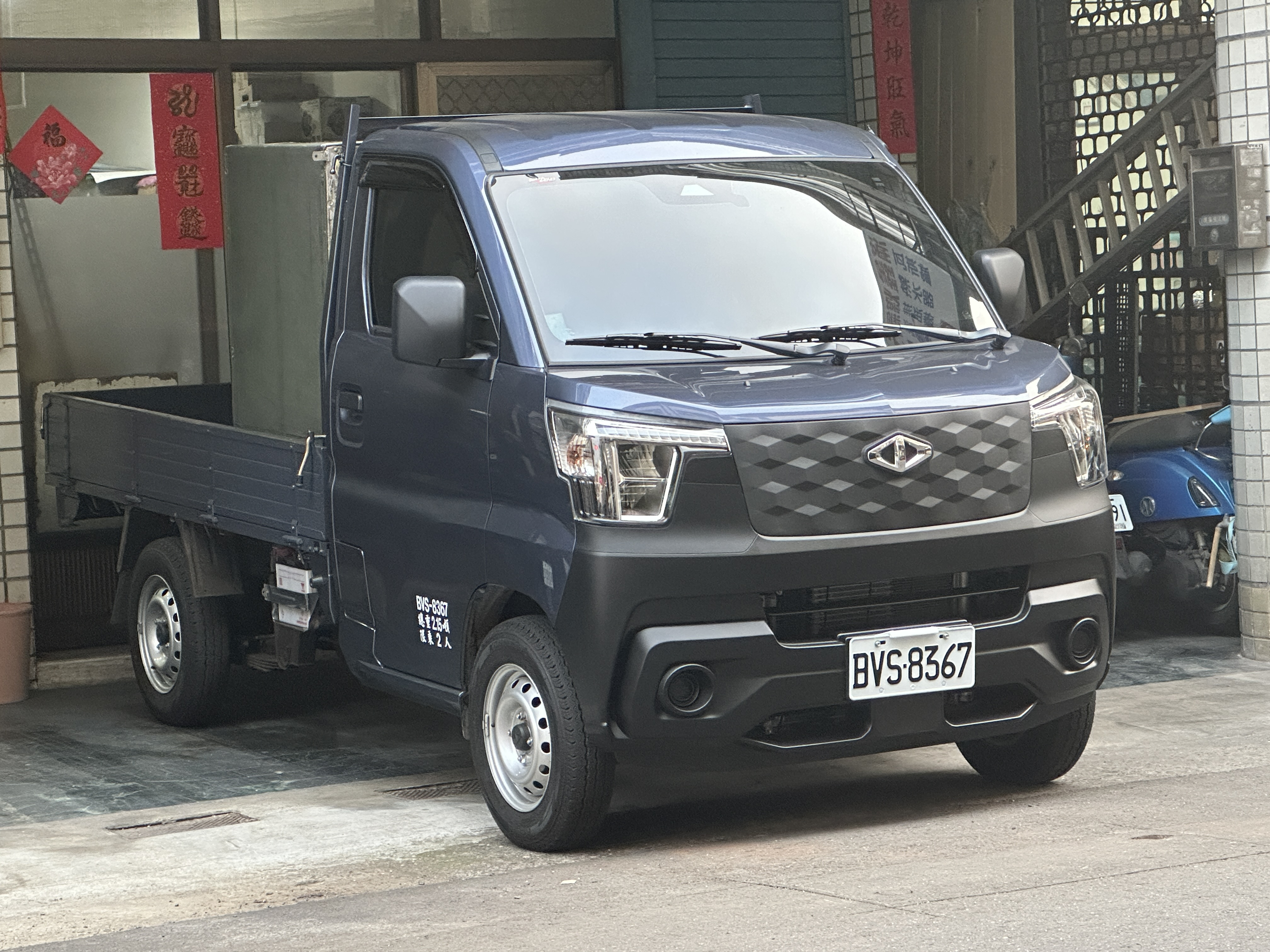
CMC J Space pickup
