= Small Commercial Vehicle =

In India the Small Commercial Vehicle (SCV) segment was created by the launch of Tata Ace in May 2005. This category can roughly be characterized as sub 1000cc engine and less than 3.5 tons of weight. This segment competes in the prevailing three-wheeler segment on the basis of cost, durability and new pollution control laws.

Mini trucks are suitable for short intra-city deliveries, plying on narrow village roads, long highway hauls carrying small bulky loads or even heavy cargo. Before the coming of mini trucks to India, this segment was being catered by three-wheelers. With the Supreme Court of India's ban of overloading of cargo vehicles and restrictions on the entry of heavy commercial vehicles into city, the necessity of an intermediate segment was observed. Tata became the front runner to fill the gap by launching the first mini truck of India Tata Ace.

With the immense popularity of Tata Ace, many other manufacturers from three-wheeler segment or from Light Commercial Vehicle segment jumped into the SCV segment.

== Mini Trucks in India ==
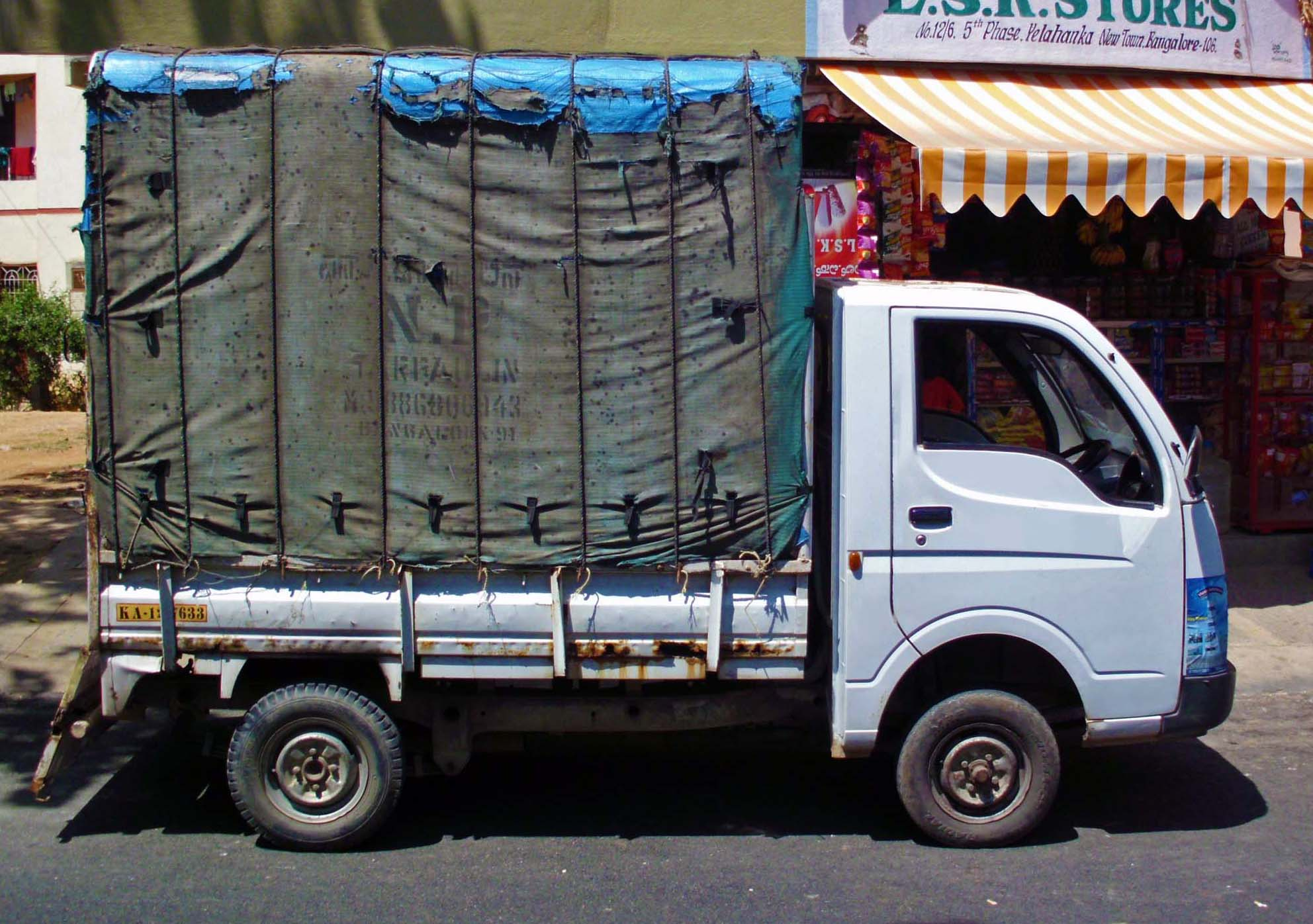
Tata Ace in India

- Tata
  - Tata Ace
  - Tata Ace Mega
  - Tata Super Ace
  - Tata Ace Zip
  - Tata Intra
- Piaggio
  - Piaggio Ape
- Mahindra
  - Mahindra Supro Maxi Truck
  - Mahindra Supro Mini Truck
  - Mahindra Gio
  - Mahindra Imperio
- Hindustan Motors
  - HM Winner
- Ashok Leyland
  - Ashok Leyland Dost
- Force Motors
  - Force Trump
- Maruti Suzuki
  - Super Carry
