= Mini truck =

Tiny but practical light trucks

Mini trucks, also called micro-trucks or mini-lorries, are tiny but practical light trucks, available in RWD or 4WD version, originally built to satisfy the Japanese keijidōsha (軽自動車) statutory class of light vehicles. In Asia, they generally fall in the sub-1000 cc engine category. These vehicles find their use in intra-city low tonnage cargo delivery, like postal and courier services or home delivery of appliances from dealer to the customer i.e. light loads over short distances.

== Worldwide usage ==
In the US, the Telo MT1 has been described as a mini truck for delivering the passenger capacity, payload capacity, and towing capacity of mid-sized pickup trucks while being several feet shorter. The truck will be released with a battery option providing 560 km (350 miles) of range and 250 kW DC fast-charging to enable long distance trips.

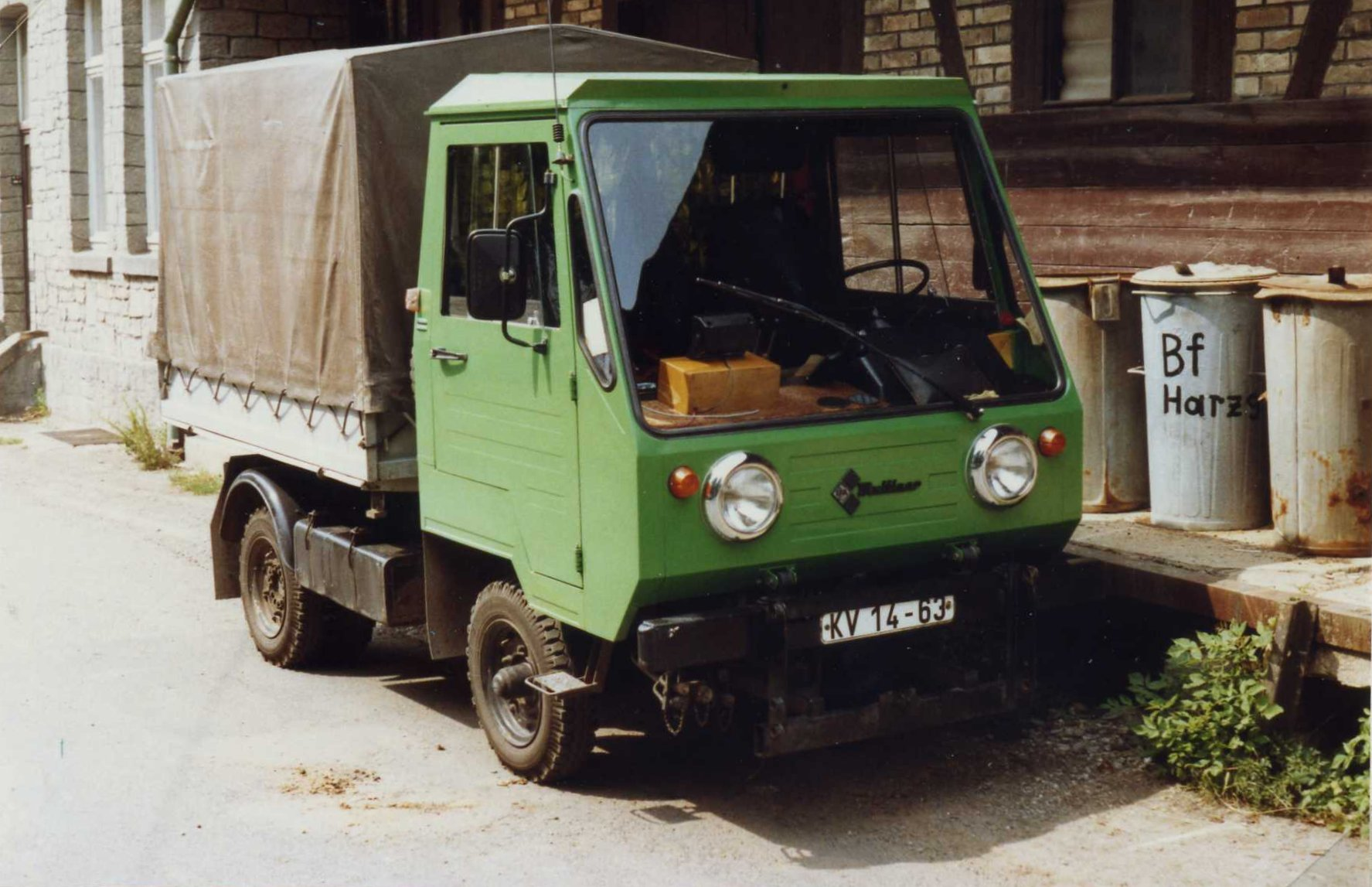
Multicar M25

A parallel development happened in Eastern Europe, where the East-German firm Multicar developed the eponymous Multicar M22, M24 and above all M25, which defined the form-factor in Eastern Europe for several decades.

The rationale was slightly different in Eastern Europe than in Japan - to carry heavy loads (up to 2 metric tons) within industrial areas, construction sites, agricultural areas, working for communal services etc. To satisfy this, the Multicar 25 was designed in a modular fashion and fitted with a hydraulic pump, so it was easy to fit a fixed bed, tilting dumper or other variants. Over 100,000 Multicars M25s were made and their presence was ubiquitous in Central and Eastern Europe. By 1990s, both a follow-up of Multicar M26, as well as Multicar form-factor-inspired vehicles like the Czech AGM Magma/Alficar/Zebra were produced. However, the Multicar brand emerged as the dominant player in the communal and micro-truck sector.

In Italy, the Piaggio Porter served a market somewhere between the Multicar and the kei-trucks.

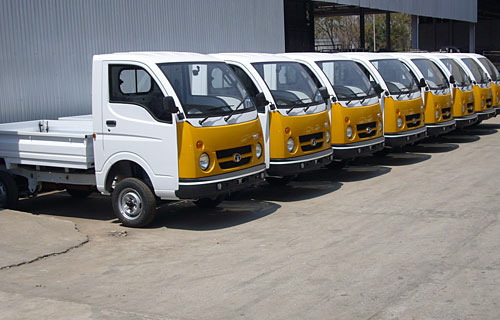
The Tata Ace was India's first mini truck

== See also ==
- Mini trucks in Japan
- Mini trucks in India
- Microvan
- Pickup truck
- UTV
