= CMC Leadca =

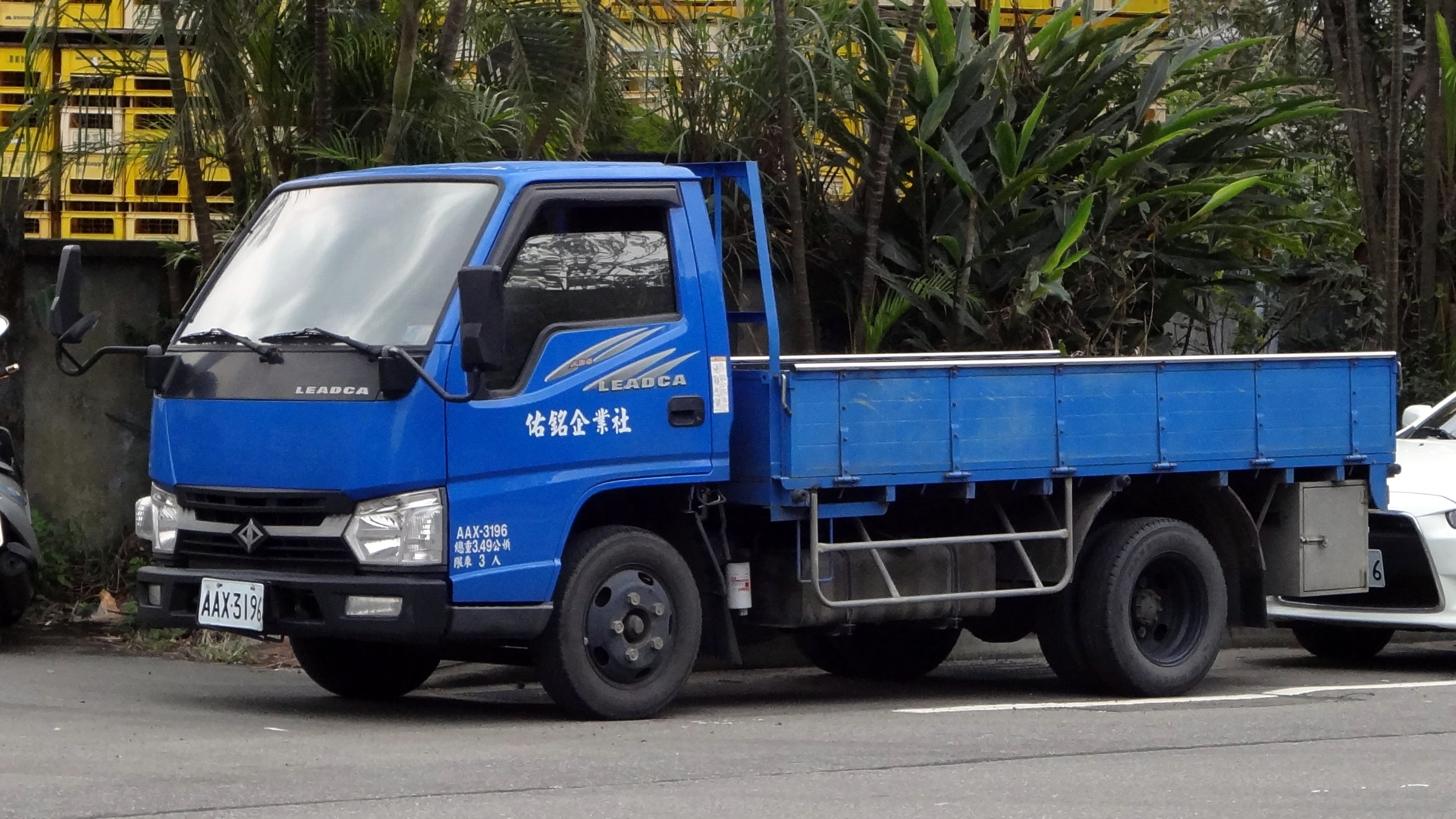

Overview
- Manufacturer: China Motor Corporation
- Also called: Wesing Canter Max (China)
- Production: 2013–2020
- Assembly: Nanshan, China (Nanshan Mitsubishi Motors); Taiwan
- Designer: China Motor Corporation

Body and chassis
- Class: Truck
- Body style: Truck (standard cab)

Powertrain
- Engine: Cummins 2,776c.c. I4 Turbo Diesel; Nissan TD27Ti 2,700c.c.(Diesel)
- Transmission: ZF 5-speed (manual)

Chronology
- Successor: CMC P350 Hybrid

The CMC Leadca (Chinese: 中華新達; pinyin: Zhōnghuá Xīndá) is a cab forward 3.5 ton truck designed and produced by Taiwanese automaker China Motor Corporation since 2013.

== Overview ==
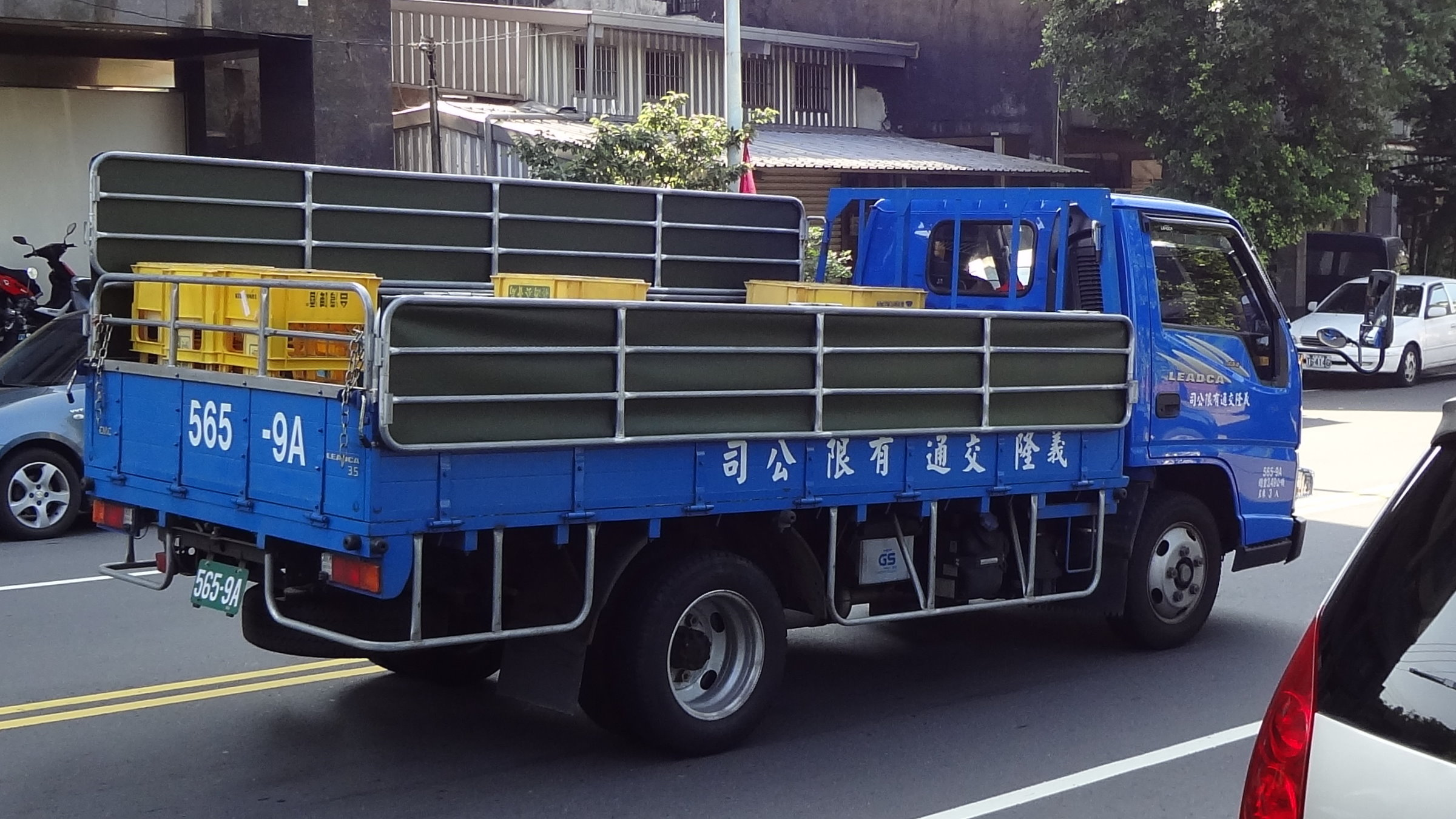
Rear view

The Leadca is the first product that was sold under the brand name "CMC" without the Mitsubishi Motors badge. The truck bed is available in 10.7 ft standard version, 11.7 ft long version, and 13.8 super long versions. While the cargo bed frame is offered in standard and reinforced versions.
