= CMC P350 Hybrid =

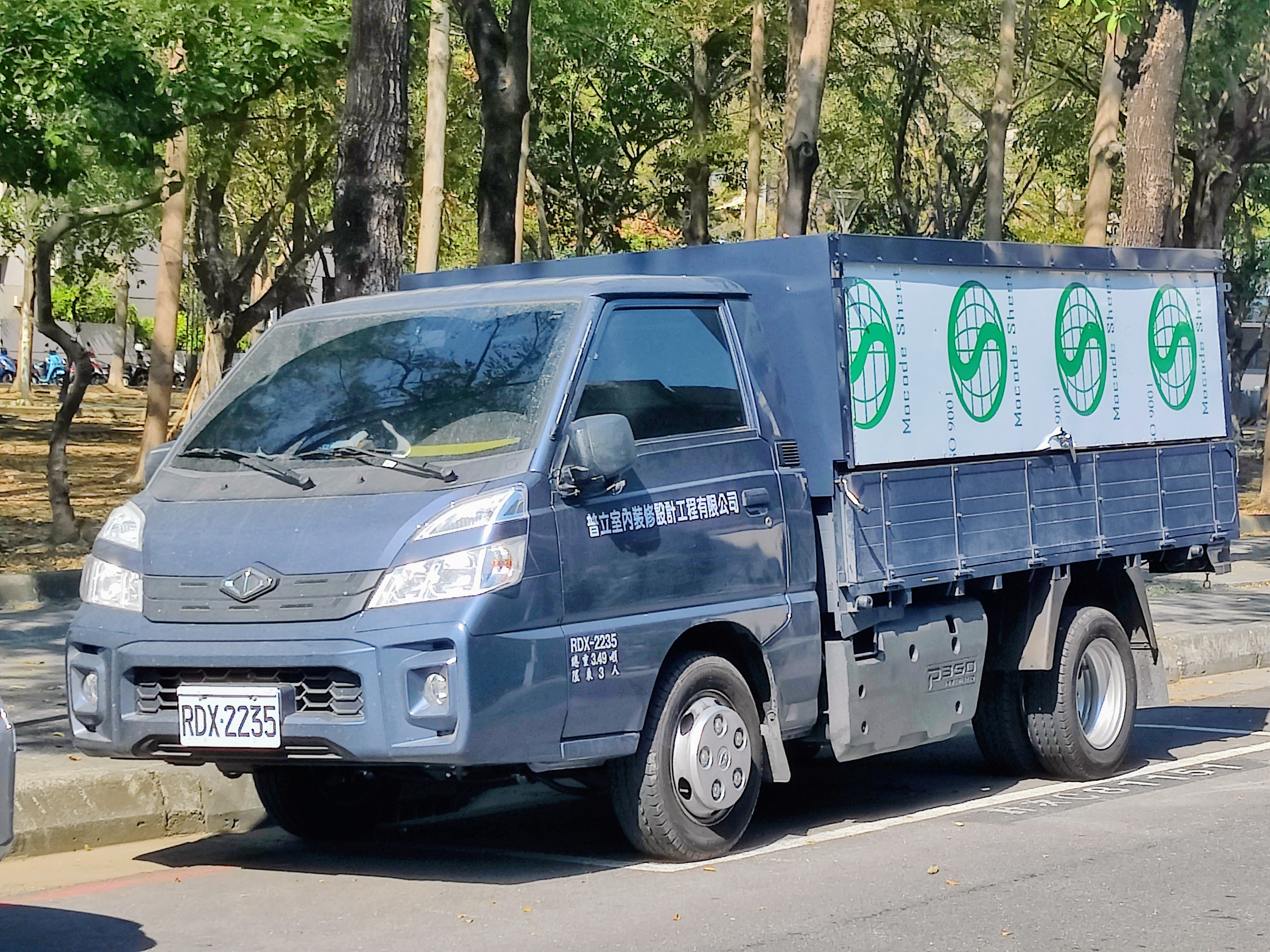

Overview
- Manufacturer: China Motor Corporation
- Production: 2022–present
- Assembly: Taiwan: Taoyuan

Body and chassis
- Class: Truck
- Body style: Truck (standard cab)
- Platform: P01V–P35W
- Related: Mitsubishi Delica

Powertrain
- Engine: "4G69" inline-4 16V
- Transmission: 6-speed (manual)

Dimensions
- Wheelbase: 2,615 mm (103.0 in)
- Length: 5,230 mm (205.9 in) (standard); 5,097 mm (200.7 in) (chassis cab)
- Width: 1,865 mm (73.4 in) (standard); 1,768 mm (69.6 in) (chassis cab)
- Height: 1,950 mm (76.8 in) (standard); 1,821 mm (71.7 in) (chassis cab)
- Curb weight: 3,490 kg (7,694 lb)

Chronology
- Predecessor: CMC Leadca

The CMC P350 Hybrid (Chinese: 中華堅兵) is a cab forward 3.5 ton dually truck designed and produced by Taiwanese automaker China Motor Corporation since 2022 to replace the CMC Leadca discontinued in 2020. The name used for marketing in Taiwan is Jianbing (堅兵) P350 Hybrid.

== Overview ==
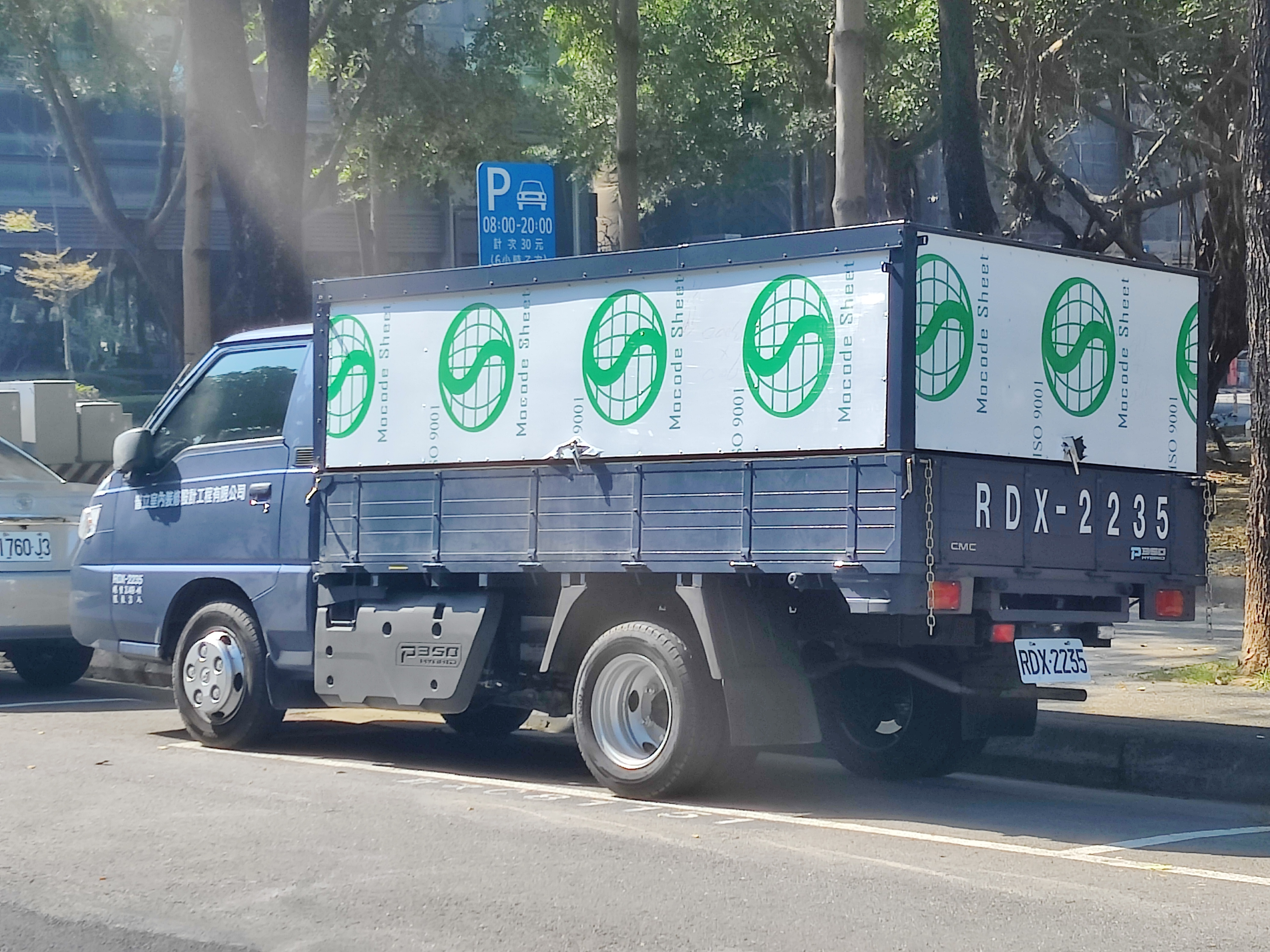
Rear view

The CMC P350 Hybrid is based on the updated third generation Mitsubishi Delica truck launched by CMC since 2019. Compared to the original third generation Delica, the P350 Hybrid features an updated powertrain producing 162.6ps, reinforced dually rear axle, and reinforced body frame. The P350 Hybrid truck has a hybrid system that features Integrated Starter Generator (ISG) developed inhouse. The P350 Hybrid has a 1,610 kg maximum payload capacity, 4-wheel disc brakes, and dual rear wheel. The cargo bed has a dimension of 3,079mm by 1,747mm by 360mm. The P350 Hybrid is available as a chassis cab with a maximum payload capacity of 1,905 kg, box van body, refrigerated box van body, and tailgate lift.

The CMC P350 Hybrid is powered by a 4G69 2.4-litre inline-4 gasoline engine connected to the ISG motor with a 2.1kWh battery forming a hybrid system. The maximum output from the engine alone is 133 hp and 20.4kgm. The engine and motor has a combined output of 162.6 hp and produces 26.2kgm at 3,500rpm.
