= China Motor Corporation =

Taiwanese automobile manufacturer

China Motor Corporation 中華汽車工業股份有限公司
- Logo used since 2015

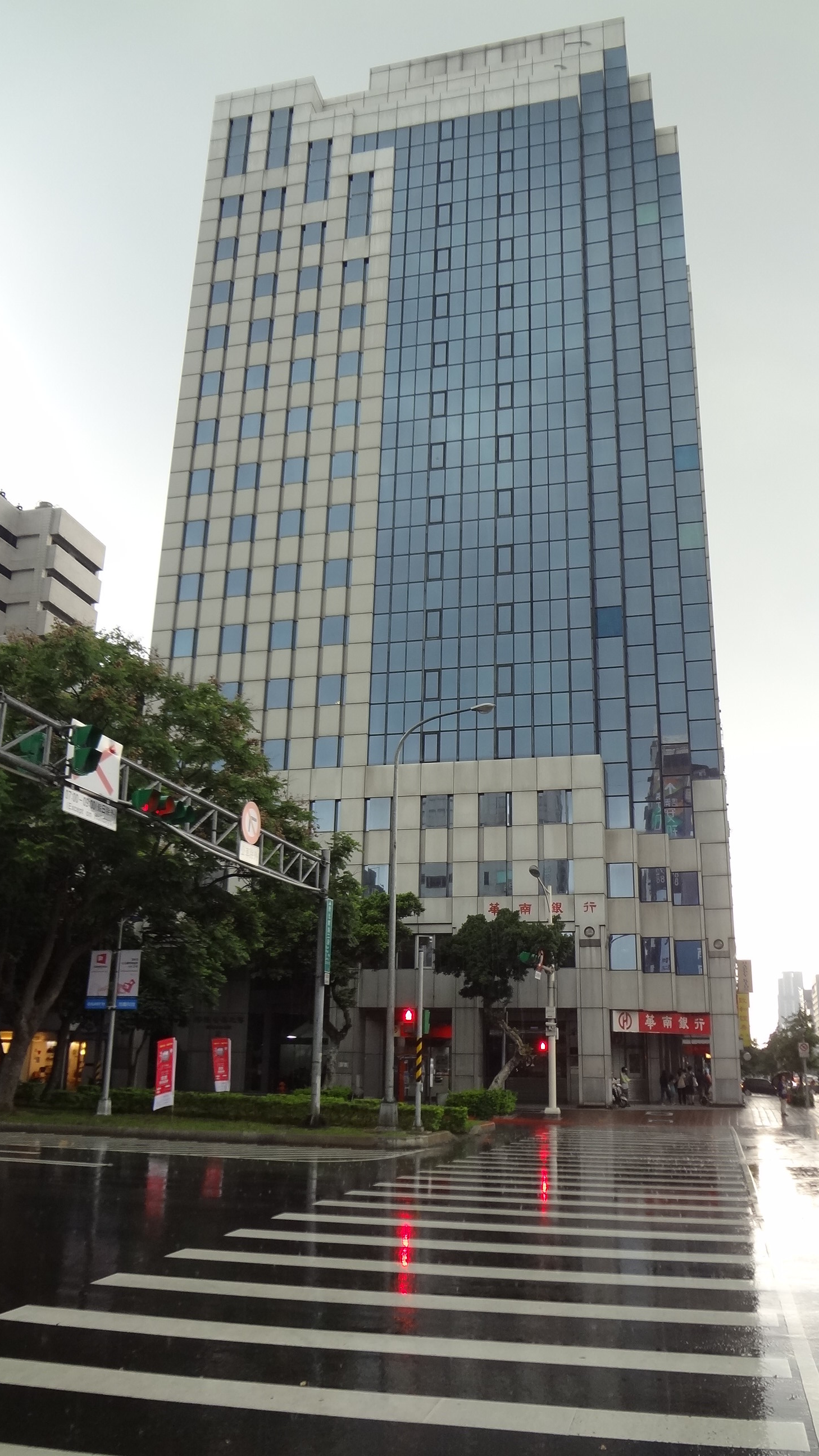
- Yulon Enterprise building China Motor Corporation Headquarters at Dunhua South Road
- Type: Public
- Traded as: TWSE: 2204
- Industry: Automobile manufacturer
- Founded: 13 June 1969; 57 years ago
- Headquarters: 11F, No.2 Tun Hwa South Road Section 2, Taipei, Taiwan
- Area served: Asia, Middle East, Africa, Caribbean, Central America
- Key people: Vivian Shun-wen Wu (Former Honorary President); Li-Lien Chen Yen (Chairman); Chao-Wen Chen (President)
- Products: Automobiles, recreational vehicles, light commercial vehicles, trucks
- Revenue: ▲NT$ 55,669.4 million
- Net income: ▲NT$ 5,397.8 million
- Number of employees: 3,407
- Parent: Yulon Motor
- Website: www.china-motor.com.tw

China Motor Corporation
- Chinese: 中華汽車工業
Transcriptions
Standard Mandarin
- Hanyu Pinyin: Zhōnghuá Qìchē Gōngyè
Hakka
- Romanization: Chûng-fà Hi-chhâ Kûng-ngia̍p
Southern Min
- Hokkien POJ: Tiong-hoa Khì-chhia Kang-gia̍p

China Motor Corporation (CMC; Chinese: 中華汽車工業; pinyin: Zhōnghuá Qìchē Gōngyè) is an automobile manufacturer based in Taipei, Taiwan.

== History ==
It was founded in June 1969, and signed a technology sharing contract with Mitsubishi Motors the following year. On 12 December 1973 they opened their first manufacturing facility, in Yangmei. Initially vehicle production was at a rate of 300 vehicles per month, but thanks to rapid growth, and the development of an advanced painting facility, the factory produced its 100,000th vehicle in 1983.

Originally they only produced commercial vehicles, but have since expanded operations, producing more than 100,000 vehicles per year. Currently they operate three manufacturing plants, two in Yangmei and one in Hsinchu.

The company has been listed on the Taiwan Stock Exchange since March 1991. In 1993 it was awarded the National Quality Award of Taiwan and were ranked first place in J.D. Power Asia-Pacific's Sales Satisfaction Index in 2000 and 2001. They have also been awarded numerous accolades for exemplary working conditions in their manufacturing plants. As of 2019, Yulon Motor Group is the largest shareholder at over 40%, and China Motor is considered part of the Yulon Motor Group. 13.97% of the company is owned by Mitsubishi. All of CMC's models are of Mitsubishi origins, adjusted to appeal to the Taiwanese market.

Since 1995, CMC has invested in China's South East Motor Corporation. In 2005, the company was given approval from the Chinese government, and signed an agreement with DaimlerChrysler to produce minivans for the Chinese market. Since June 2007, CMC has participated in the Fujian Daimler joint venture.

Zhonghua Automobile electric two-wheeler dealership sign
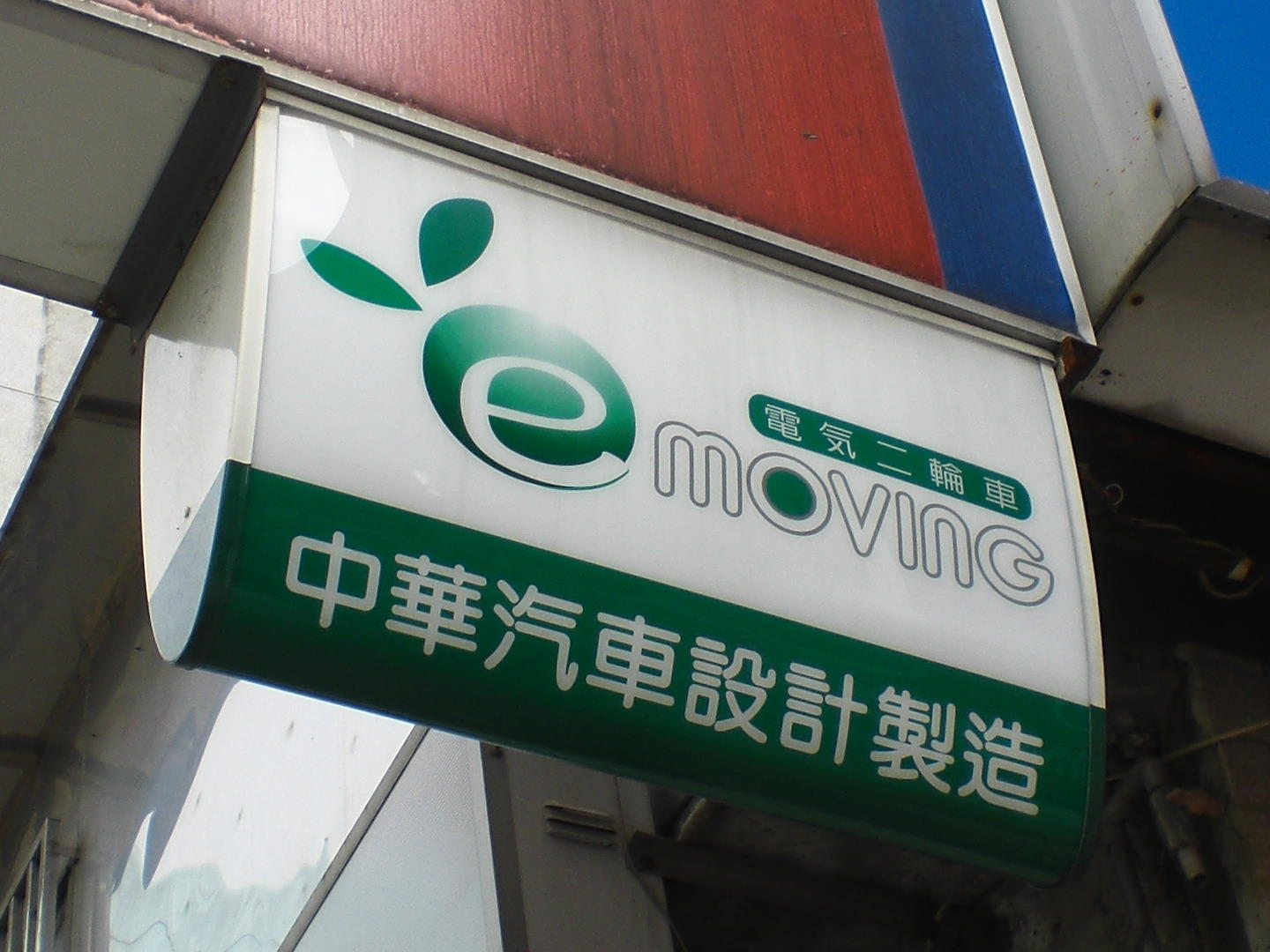
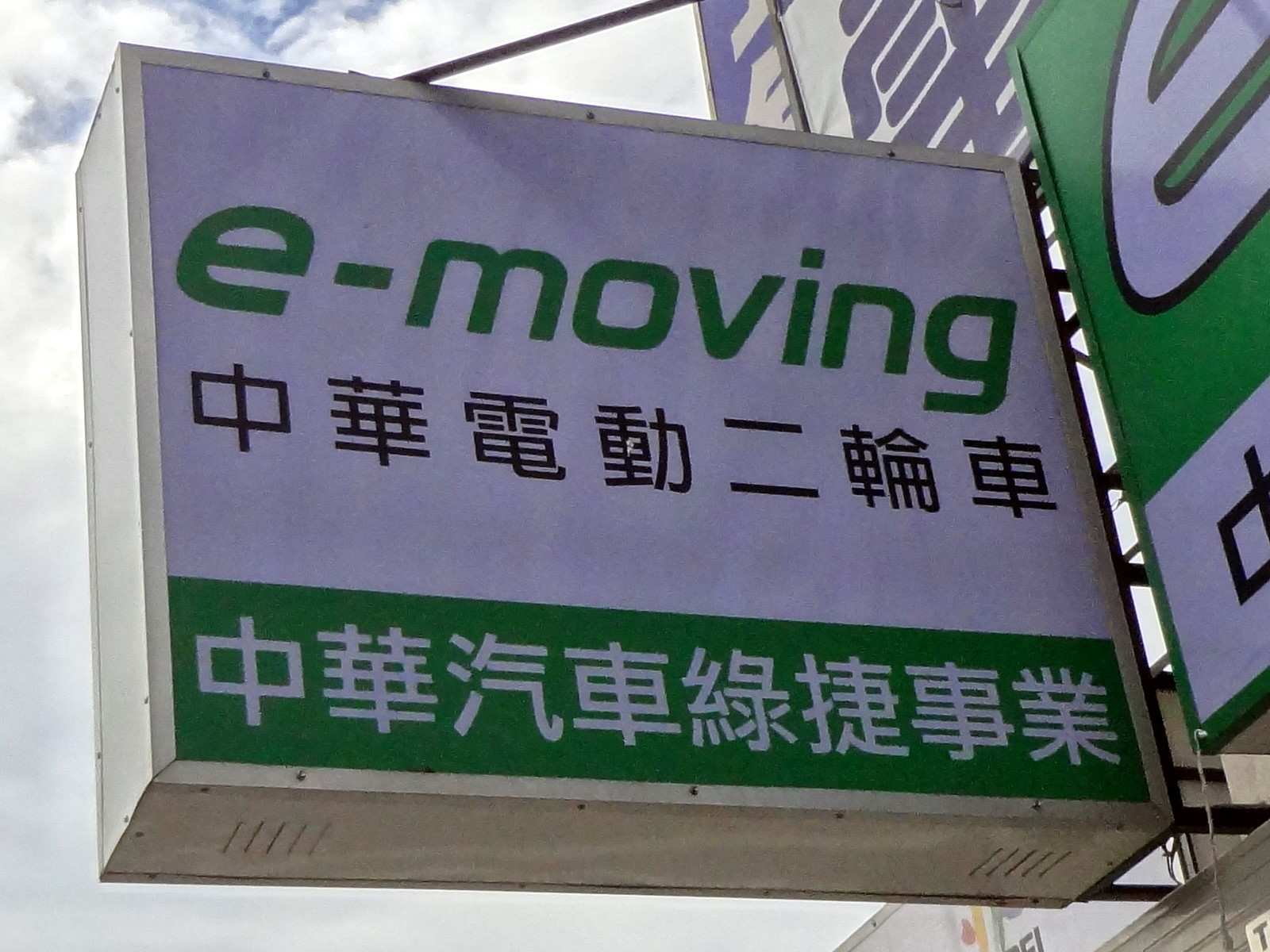

In June 2010, CMC's Electric Motorcycle "e-moving electric two-wheeled vehicle" was launched.

In September 2012, CMC obtained the consent of Mitsubishi Motors, Officially exported Lancer Fortis with independently designed appearance to the Middle East Gulf Cooperation Council (GCC) countries.

On 30 October 2013, CMC independently developed "Xinda".

In 2013, eMoving launched the first electric bicycle Bobe.

In September 2015, CMC independently remodeled and launched the Zinger multi-functional commercial vehicle. In addition to the self-developed appearance of the car body, the engine and gearbox were also upgraded.

On 6 April 2017, CMC once again independently launched a major facelift of its new-generation mid-sized RV Grand Lancer.

In July 2017, the electric bicycle "EM 25 Shine" was announced.

In May 2019, the company released its corporate vision and new third-generation corporate identity to celebrate the company's 50th anniversary.

In August 2021, the light electric scooter eMOVING-EZ1 was released, which is the company's first electric scooter to adopt the Gogoro Network smart battery swap system.

In July 2022, the MG brand medium-sized SUV MG HS from China's SAIC Motor was introduced, the 3.5-ton small truck "Jianbing" was released in October of the same year.

== Products ==
=== Current ===
==== CMC brand vehicles ====
- CMC D260/D270 (2020–present, export only)
- CMC Veryca (中華菱利, 2000–present)
- CMC Zinger (中華雙贏, 2005–present)
- CMC P350 Hybrid (中華堅兵, 2022–present)
- CMC J Space (2024–present)
- CMC ET35 (2025–present)
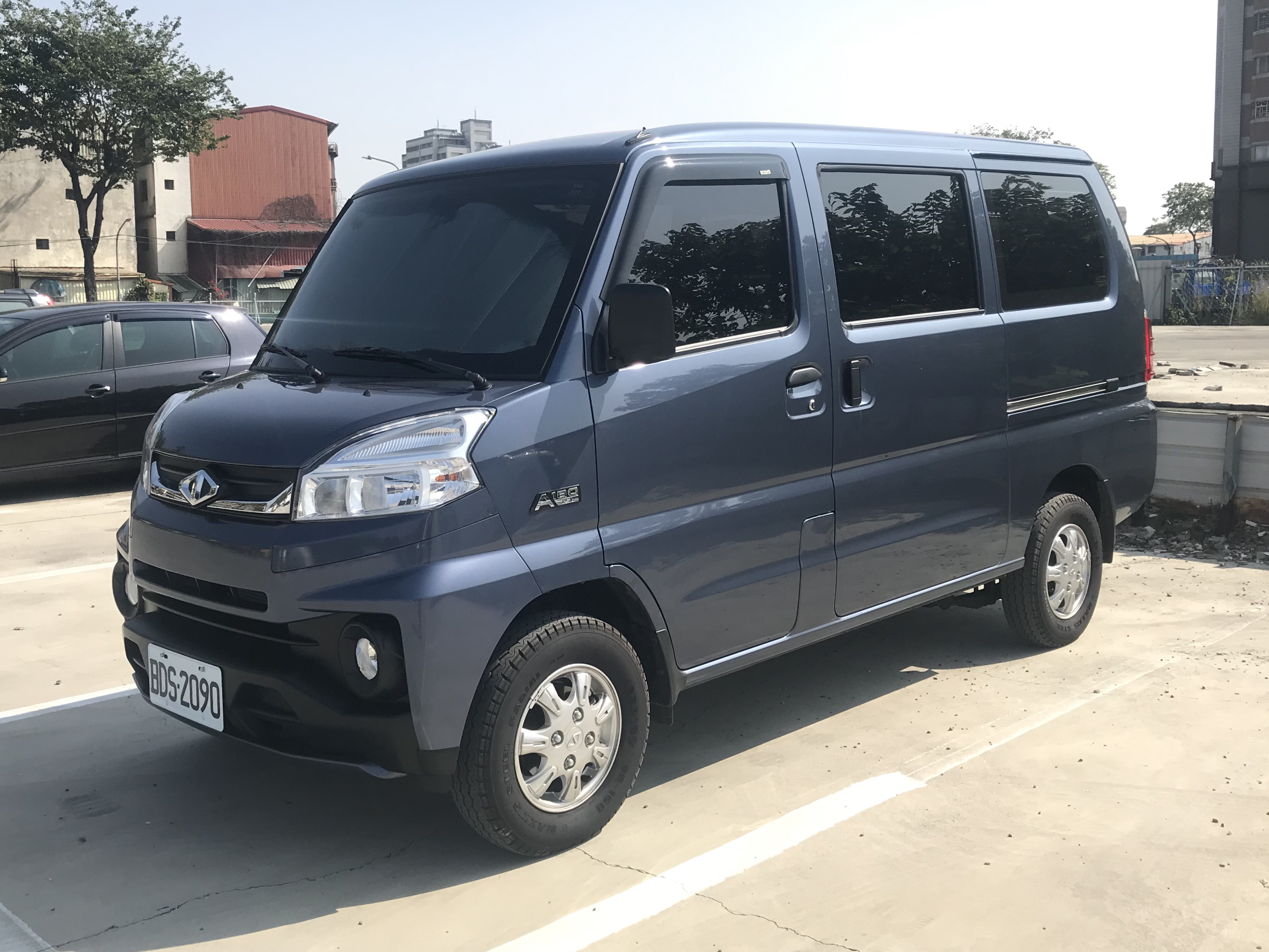
CMC Veryca

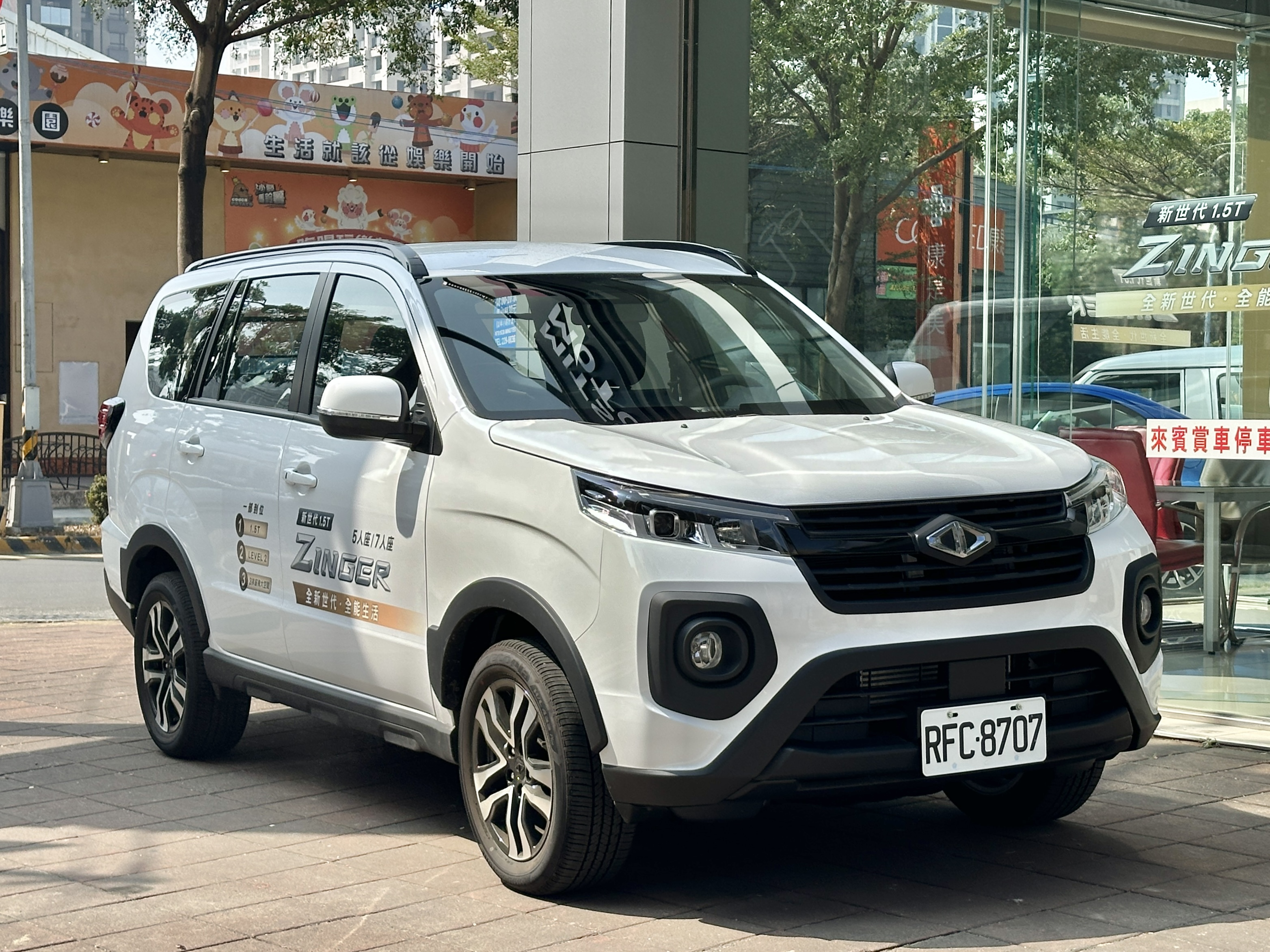
CMC Zinger

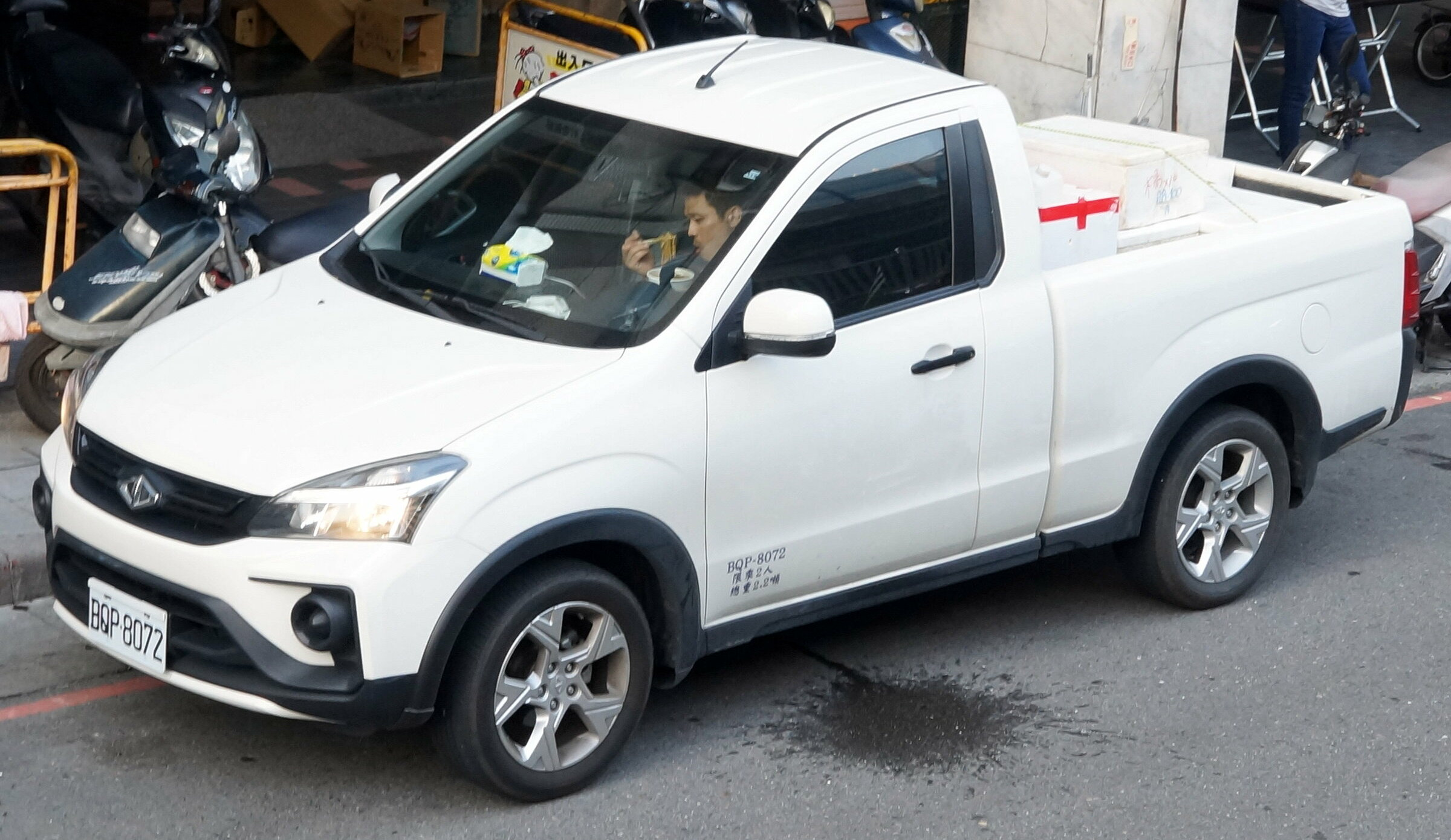
CMC Zinger Pick up

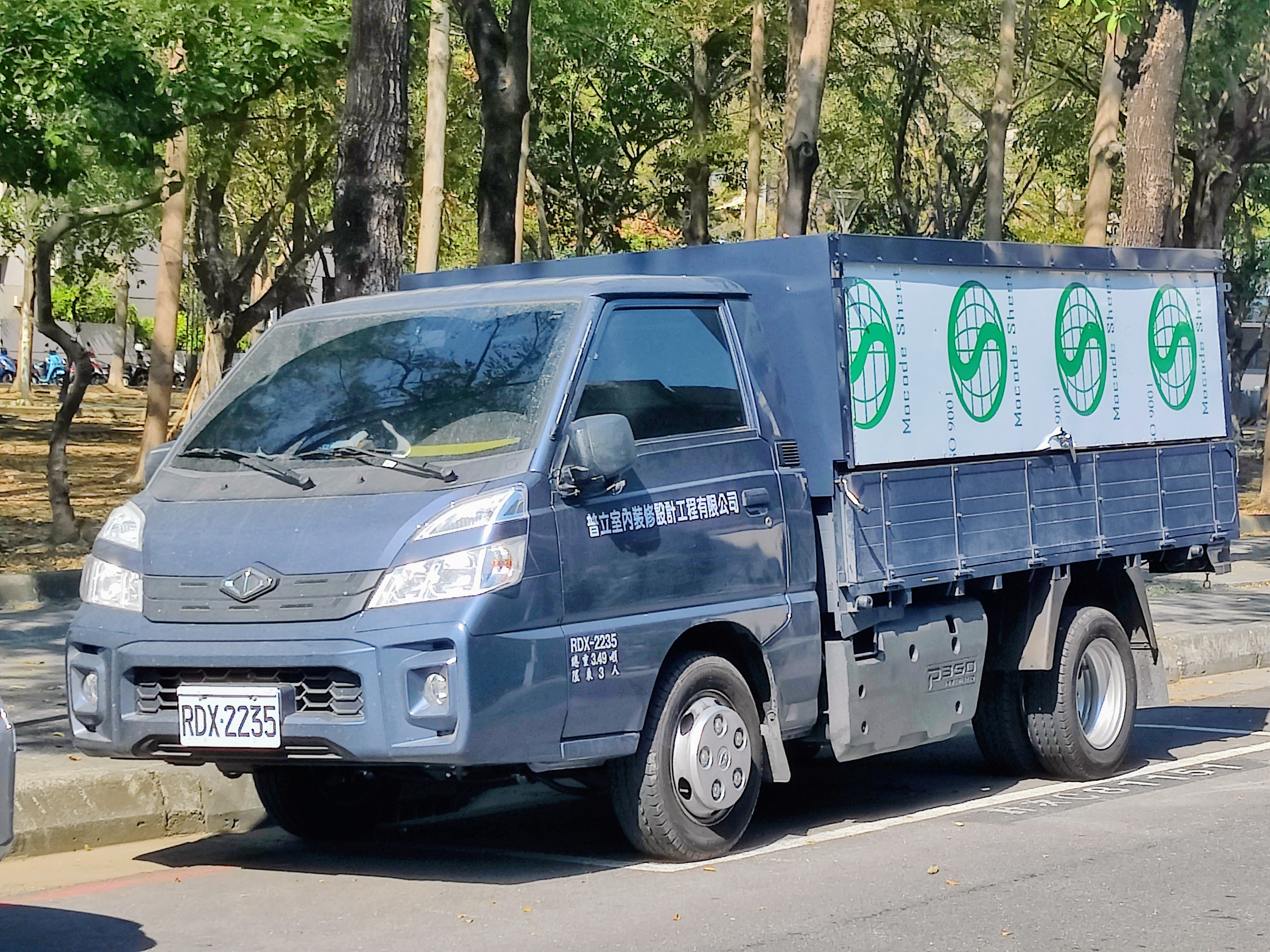
CMC P350 Hybrid

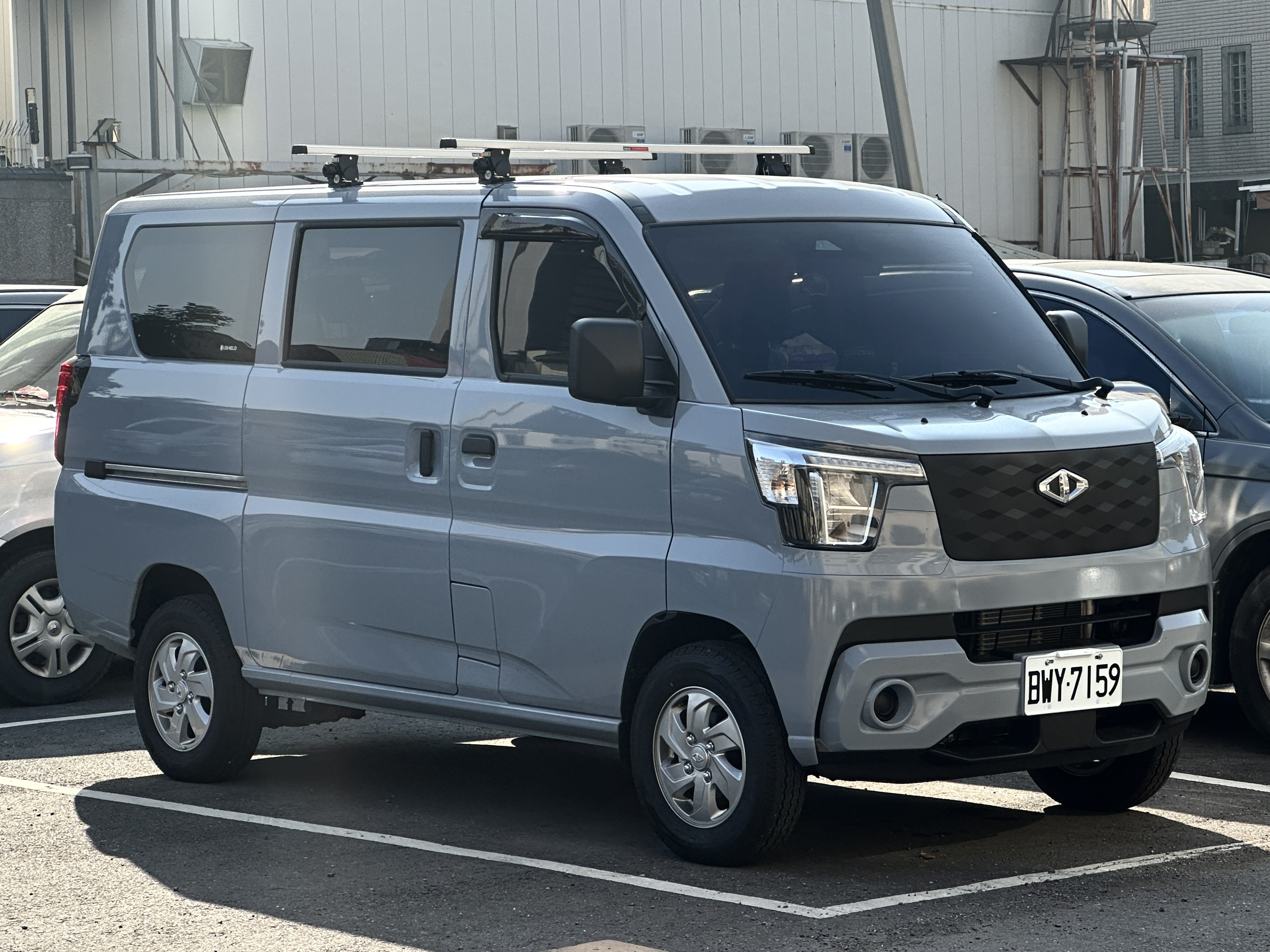
CMC J Space

==== Mitsubishi brand vehicles ====
- Mitsubishi Colt Plus (2007–present)
- Mitsubishi Delica (中華得利卡, 1973–present)
- Mitsubishi Outlander (2001–present) (Import form 2026)
- Mitsubishi Xforce (2025–present)
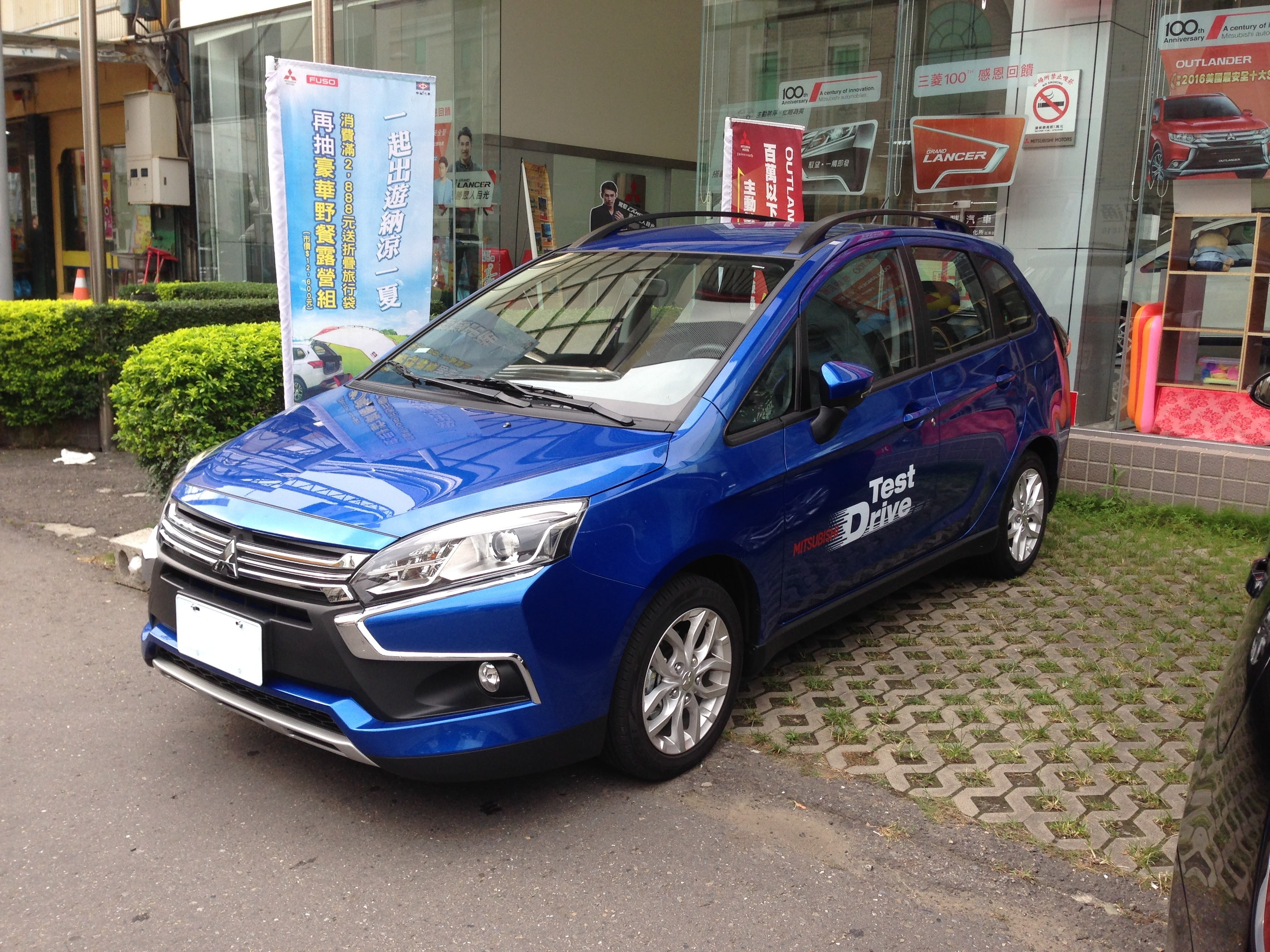
Mitsubishi Colt Plus

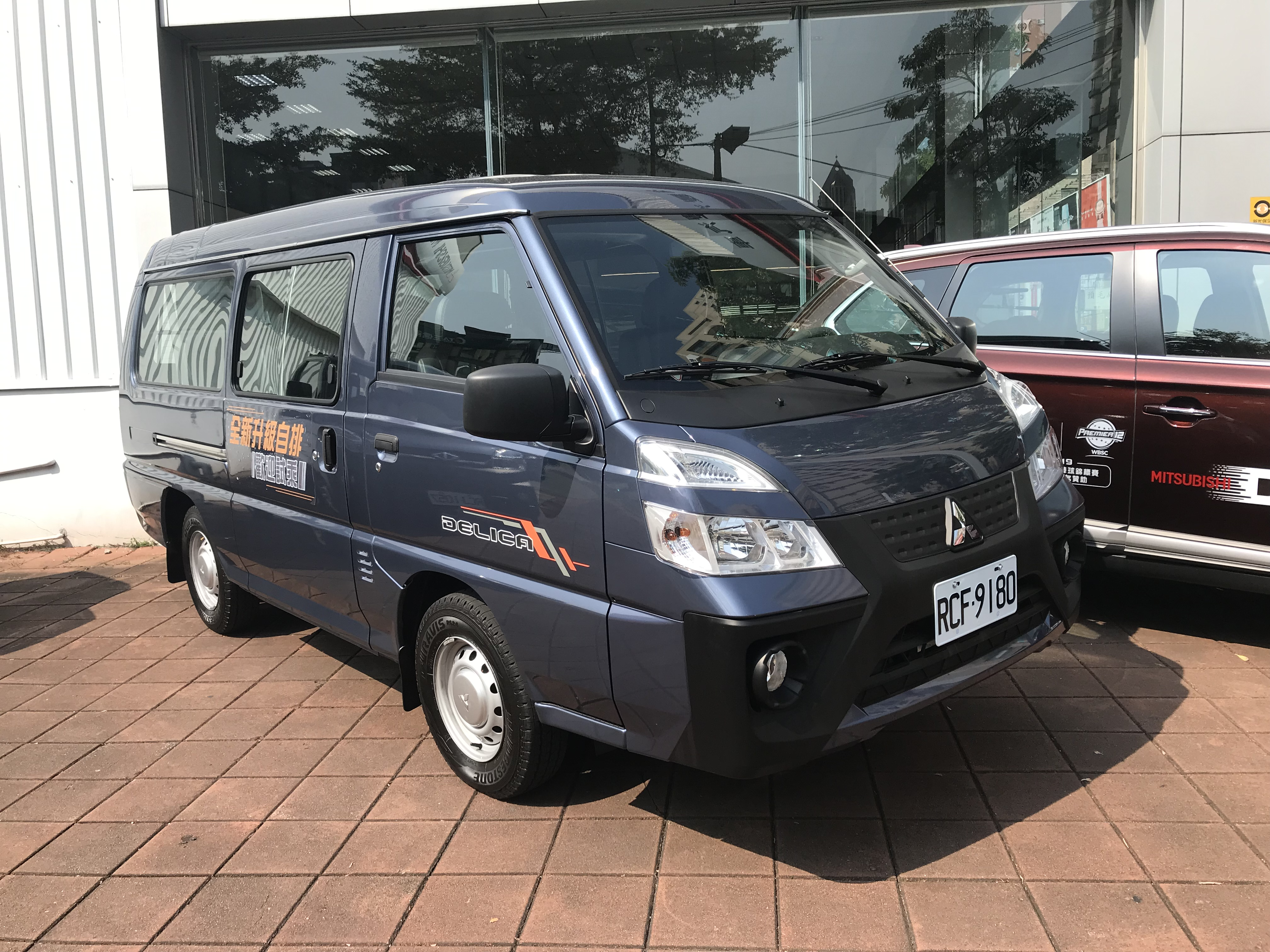
Mitsubishi Delica

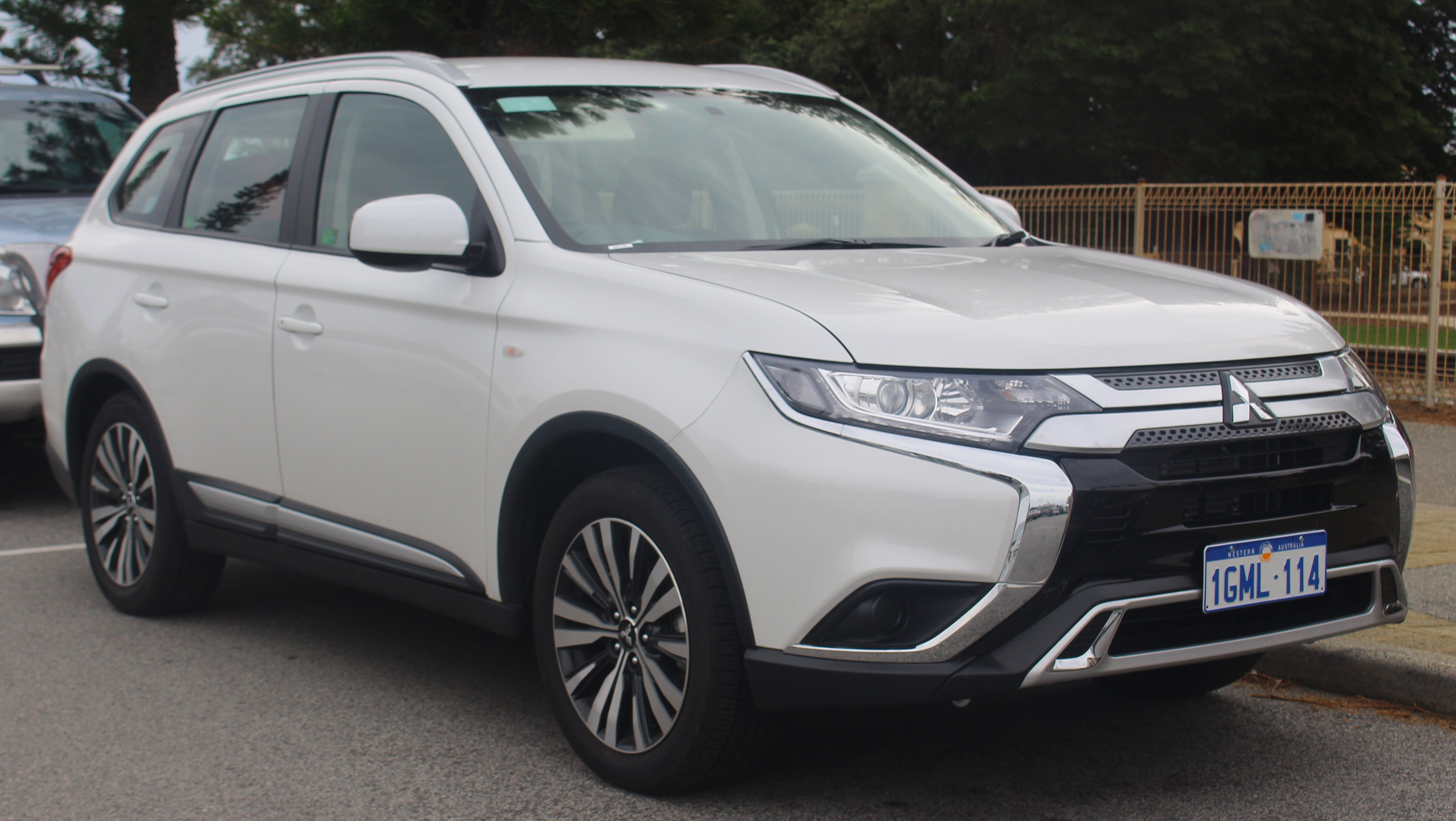
Mitsubishi Outlander

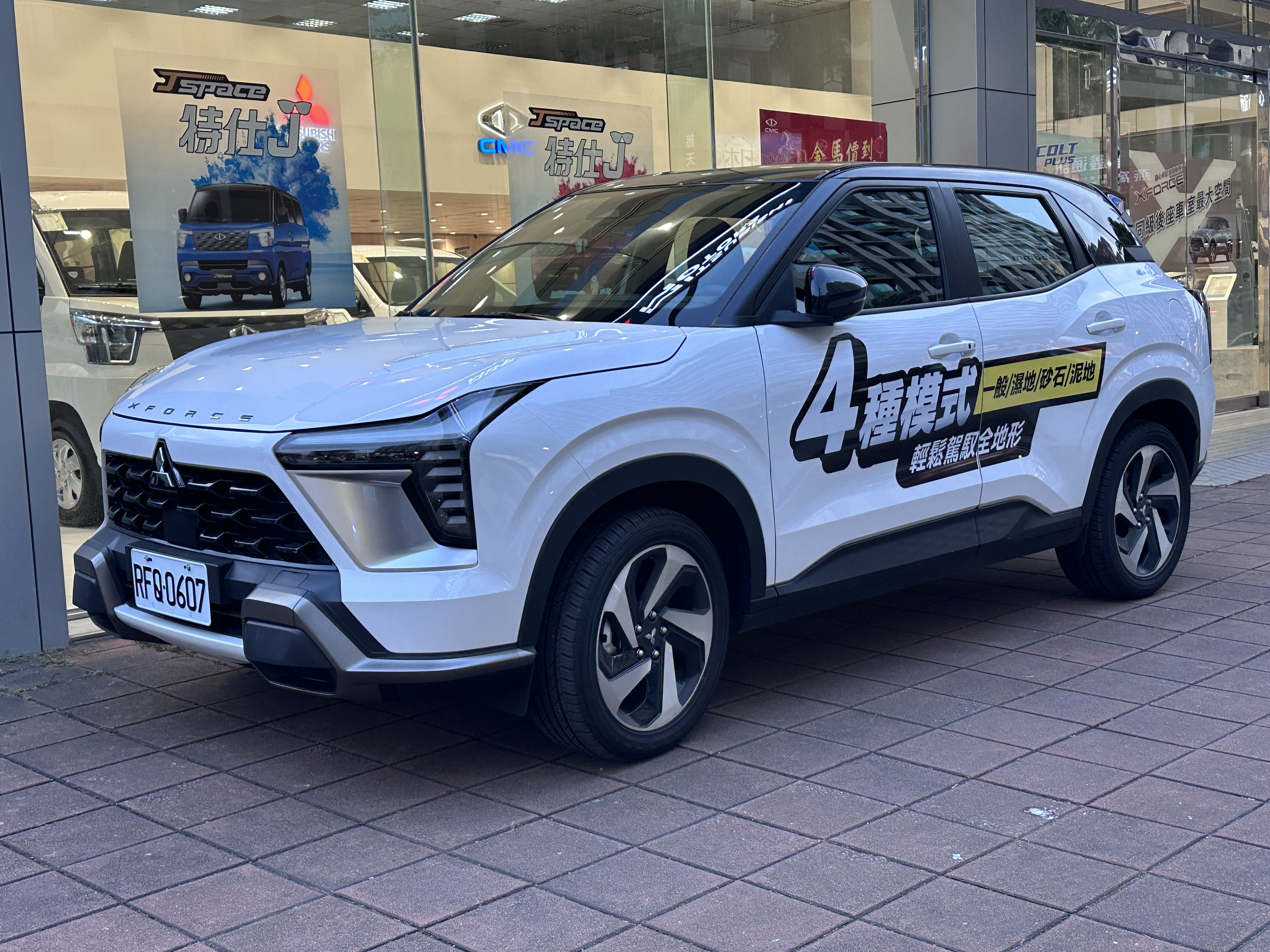
Mitsubishi Xforce

==== MG brand vehicles ====
- MG HS (2022–present)
- MG ZS (2023–present)
- MG4 EV (2024–present)
- MG G50 Plus (2025–present)
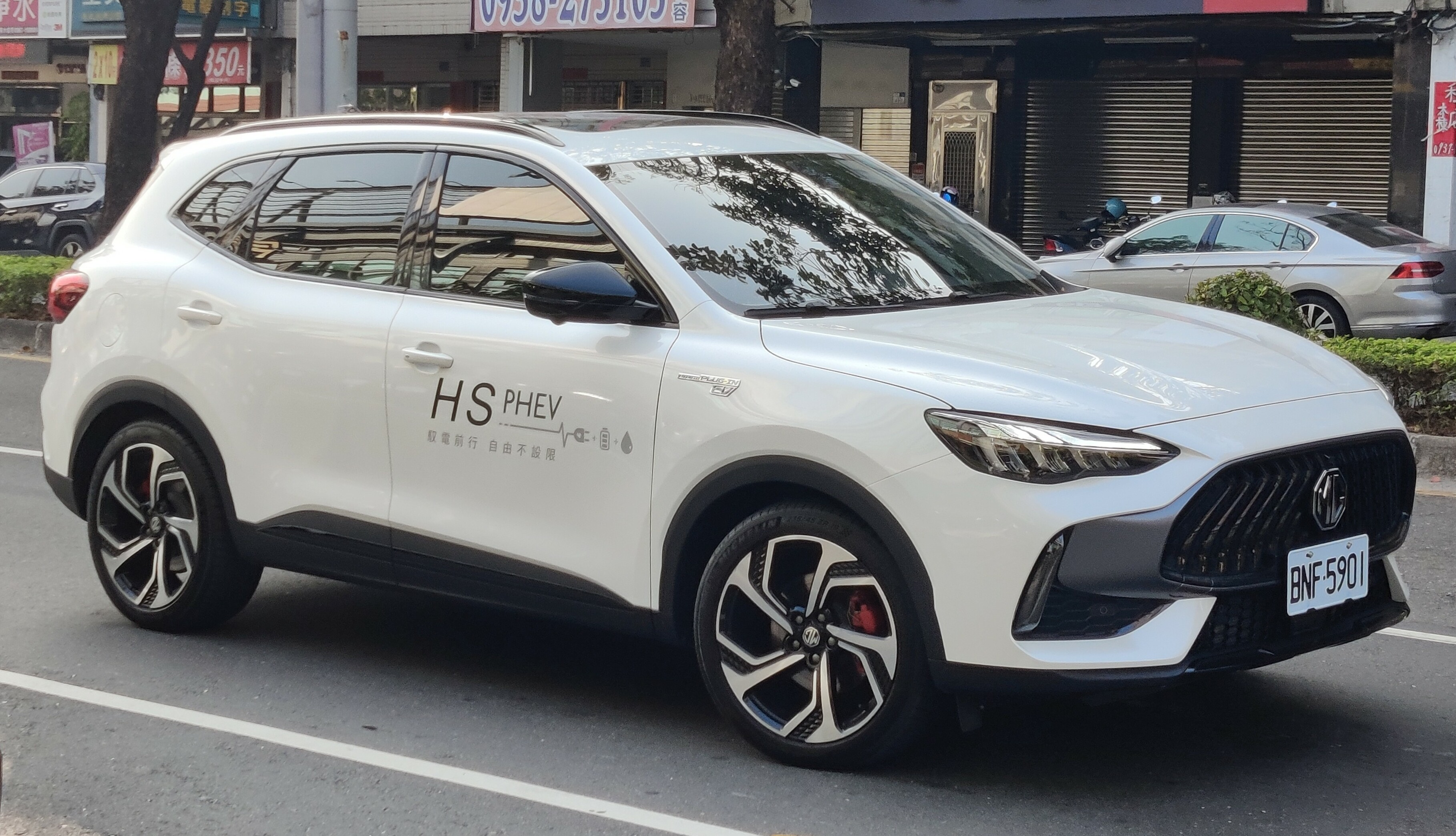
MG HS

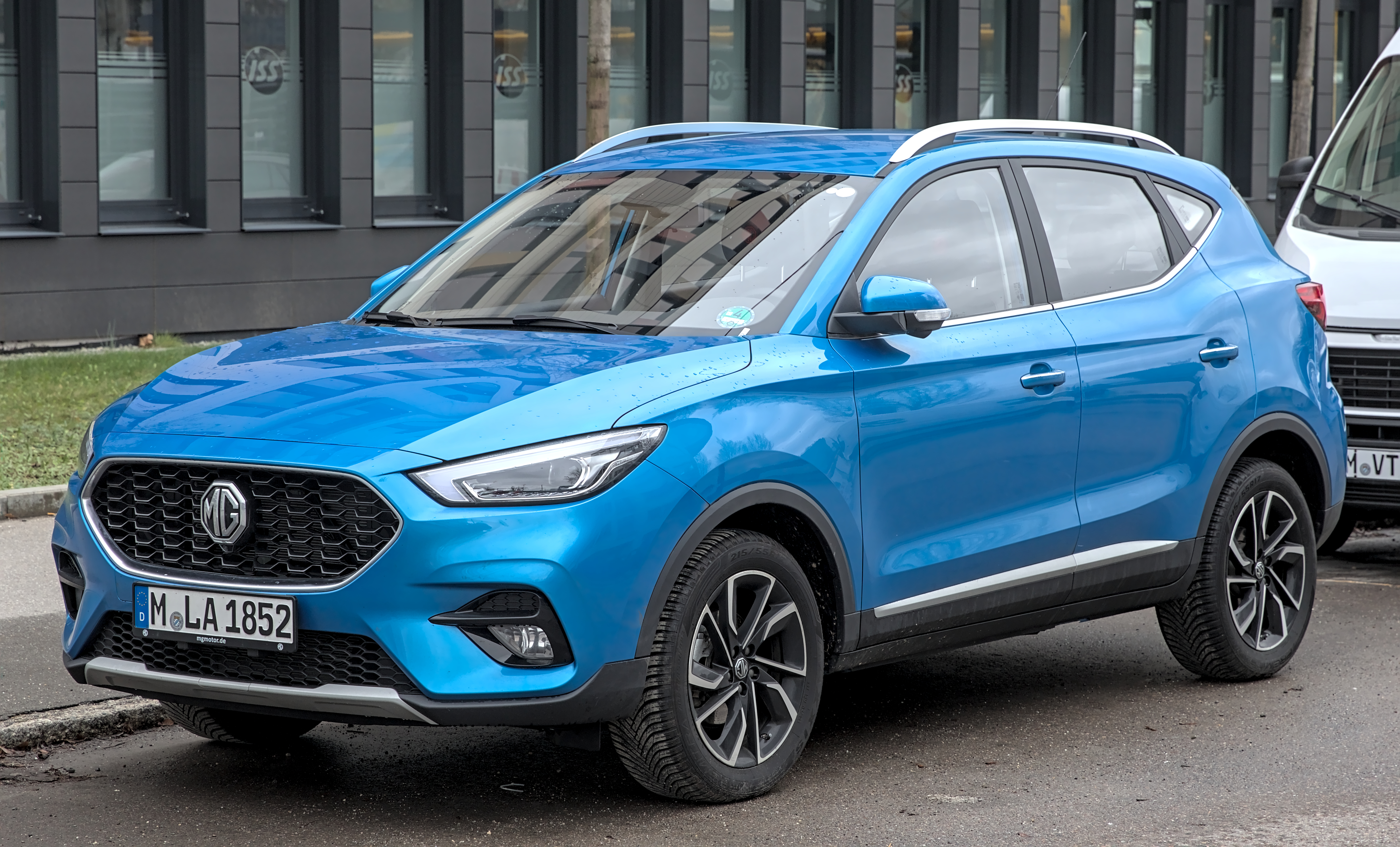
MG ZS

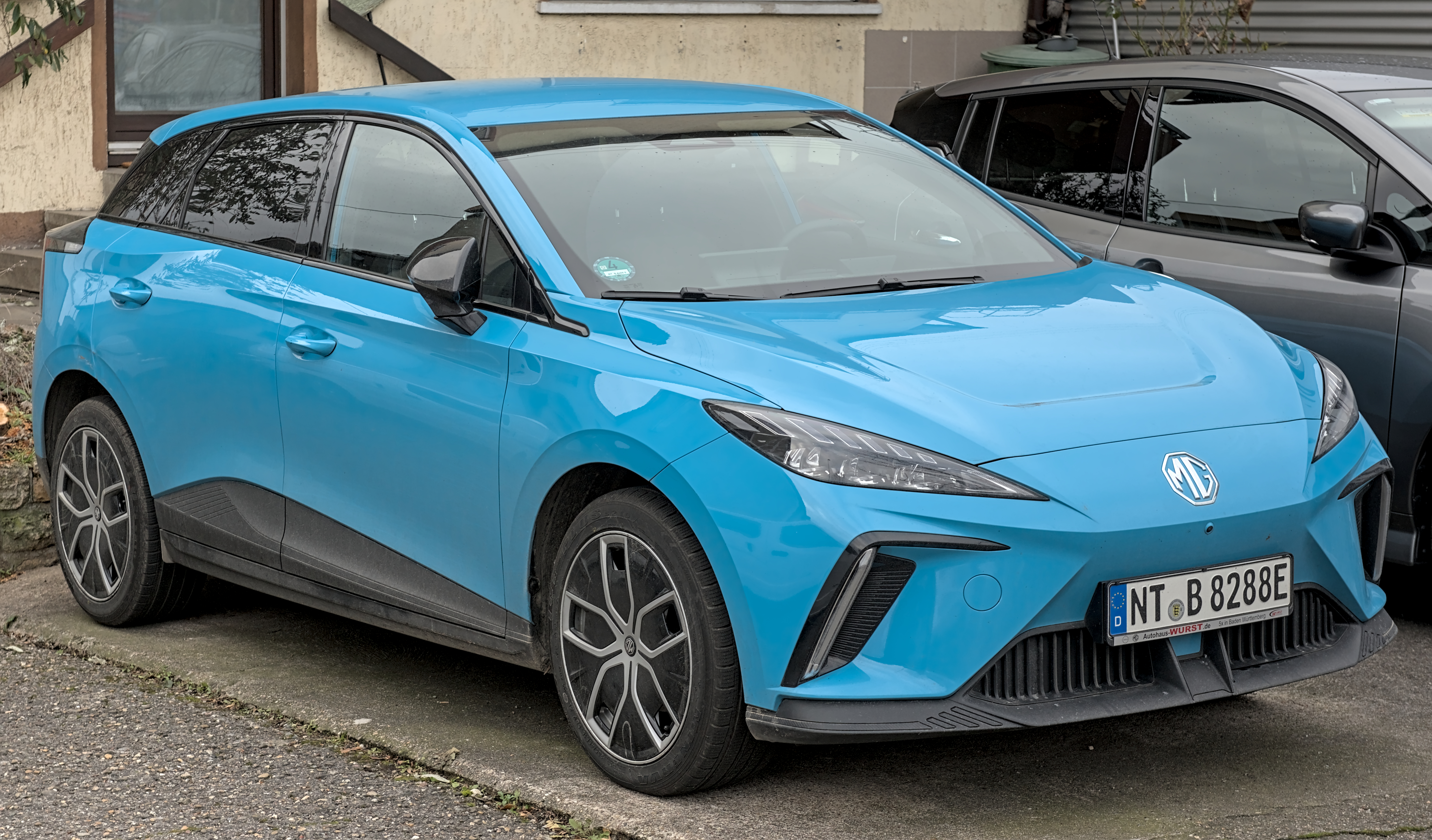
MG4 EV

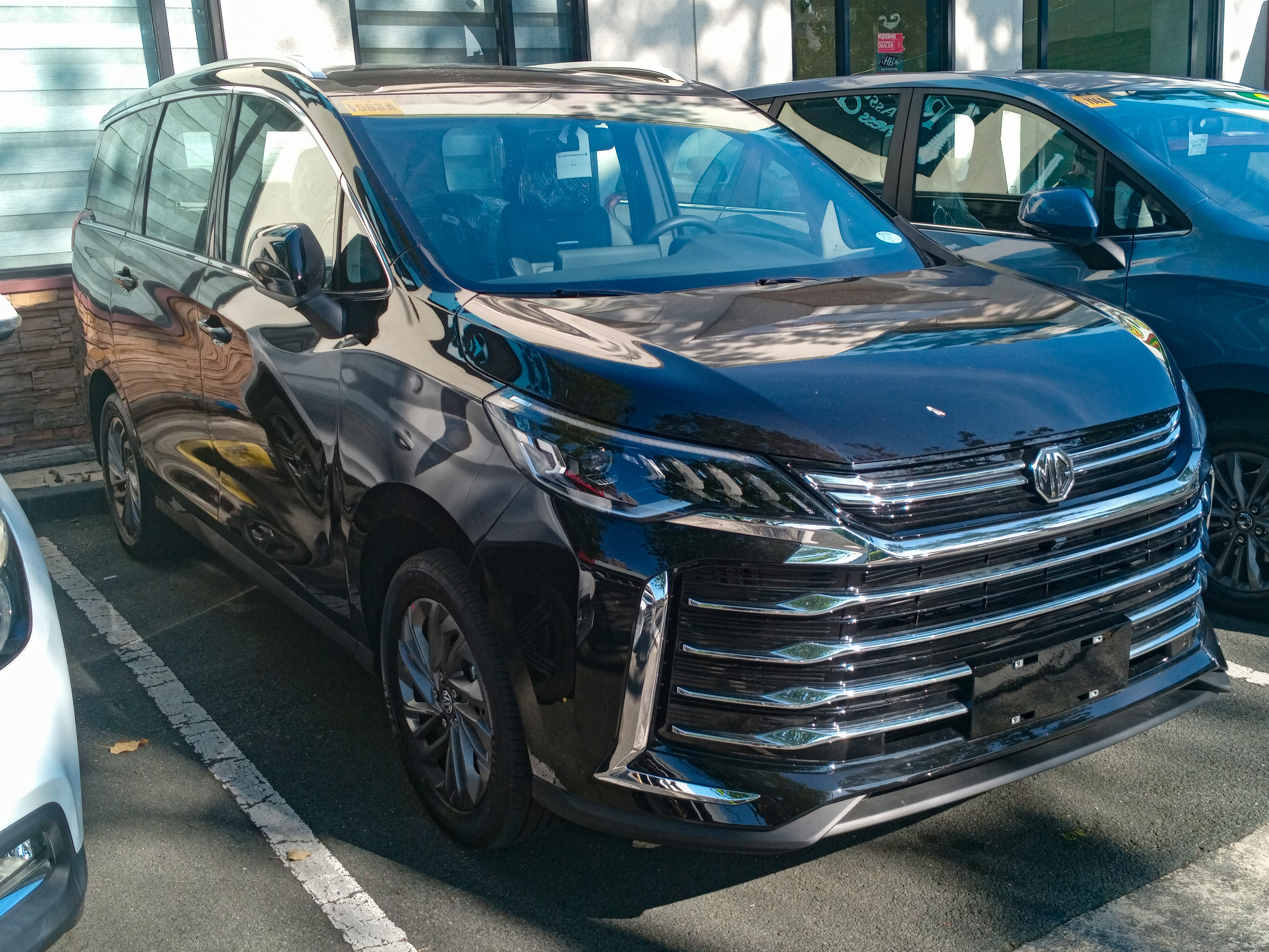
MG G50 Plus

=== Former ===
==== CMC brand vehicles ====
- CMC Minicab (1978–1985)
- CMC Towny (中華多利, 1985–1992)
- CMC Varica (1985–2000)
- CMC Leadca (中華新達, 2013–2020)
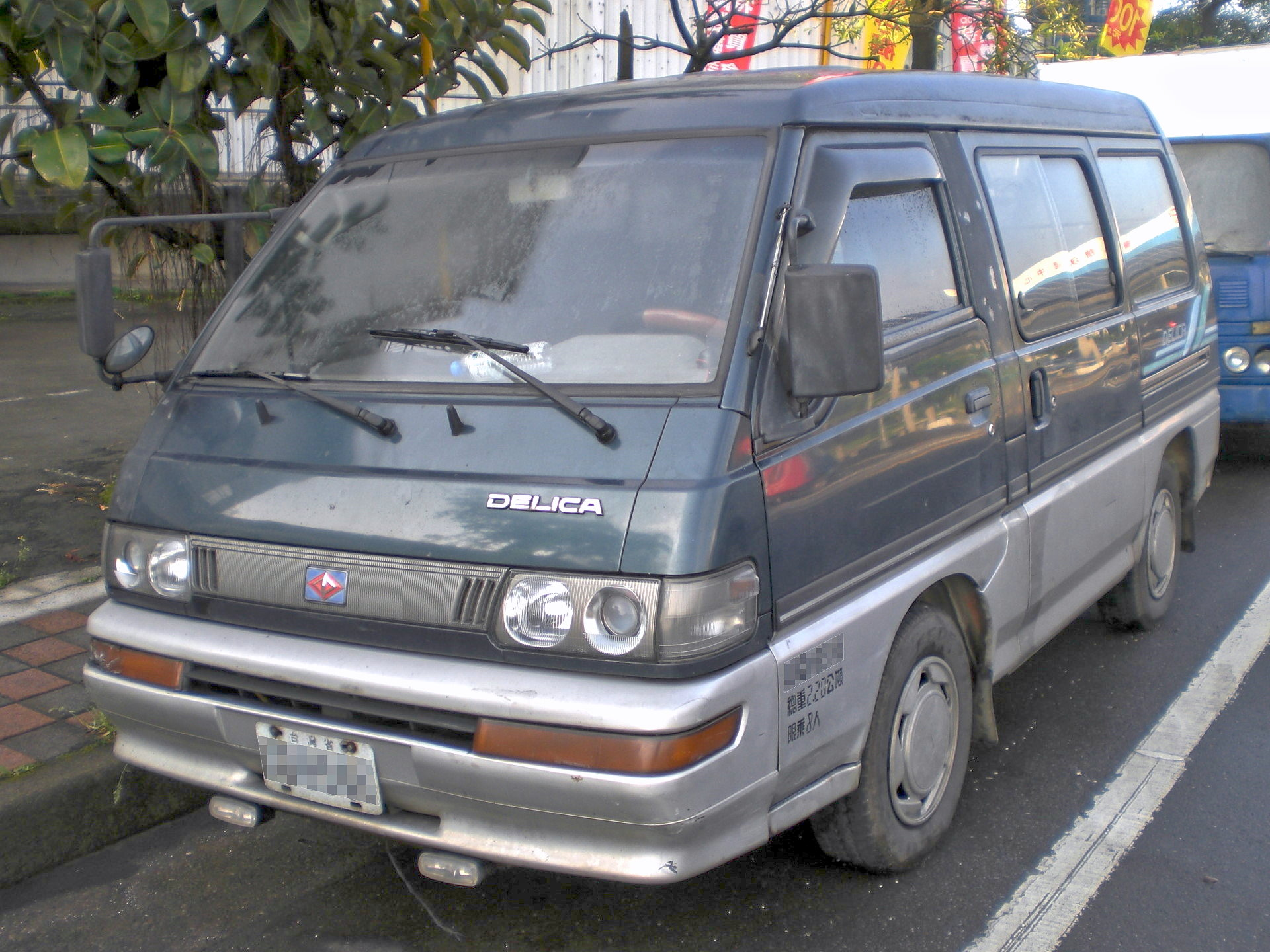
CMC Delica 2.0GL van

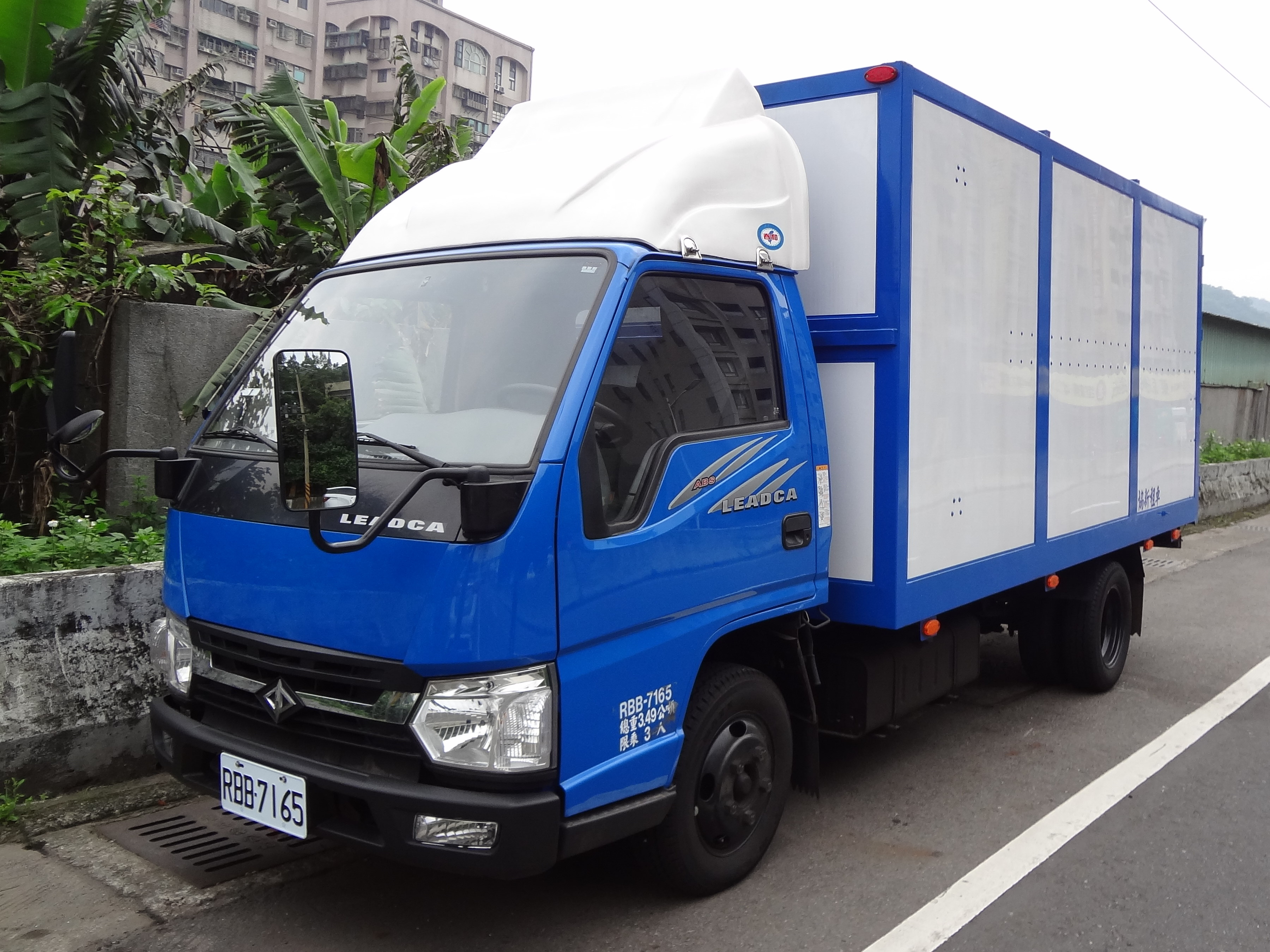
CMC Leadca

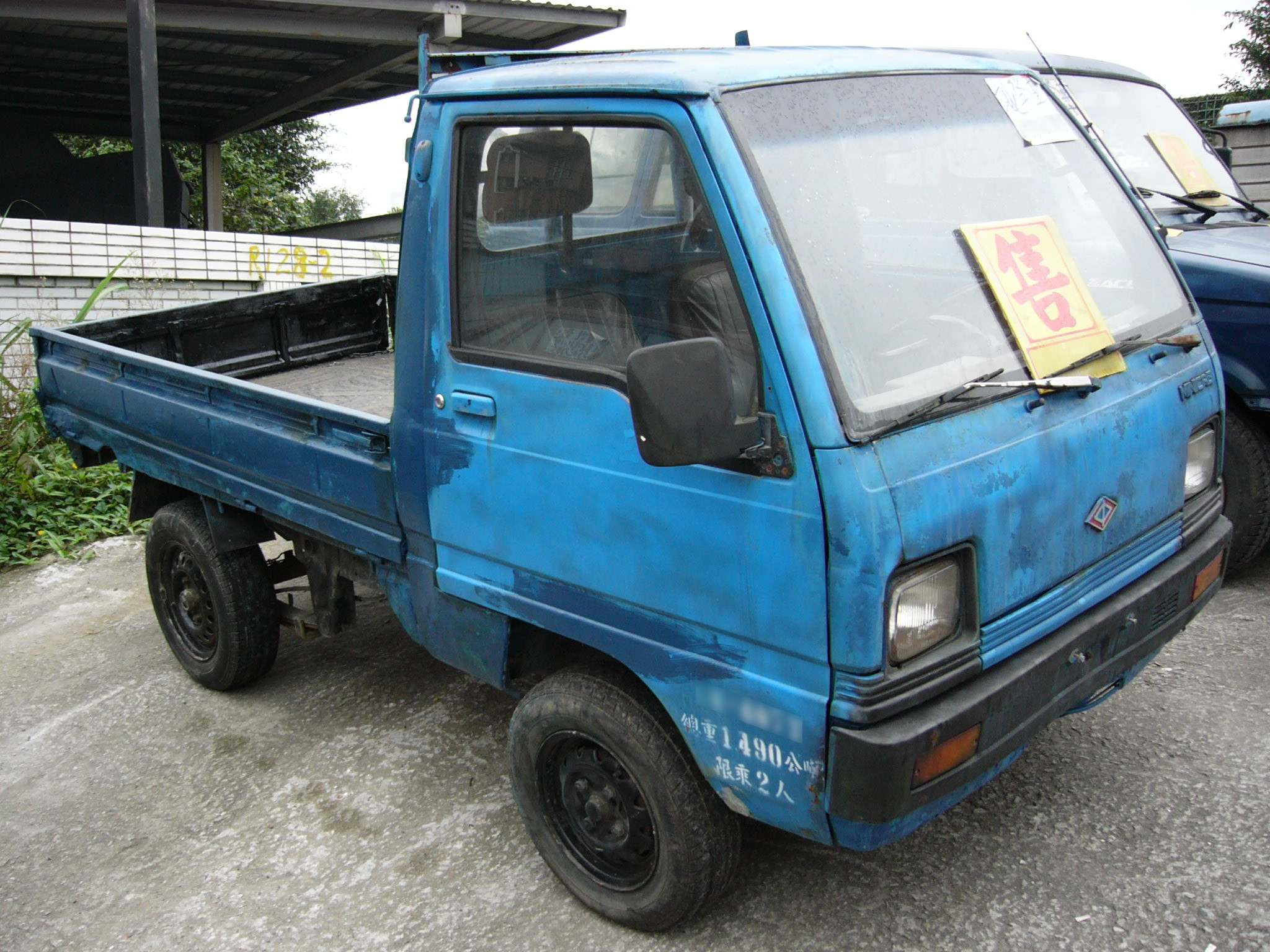
CMC Minicab truck in 1980s

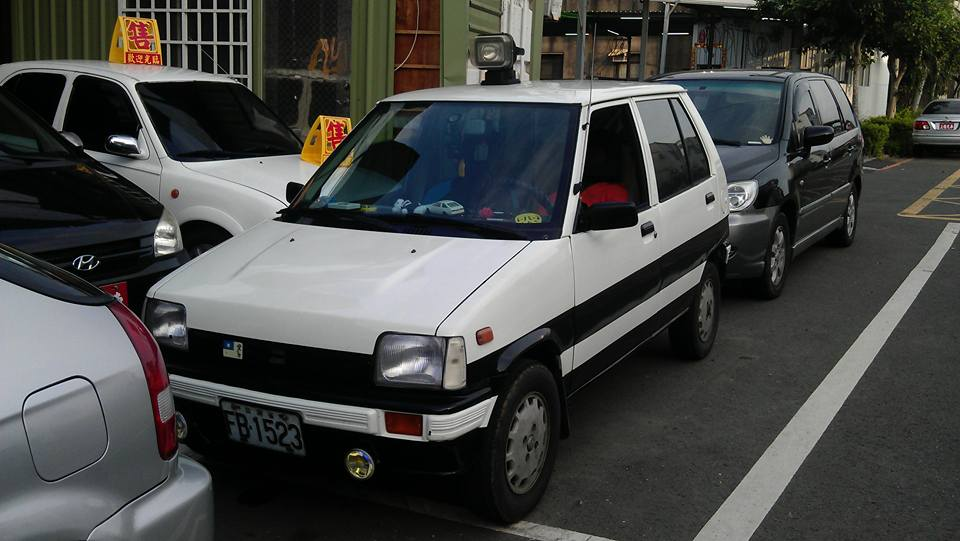
CMC Towny

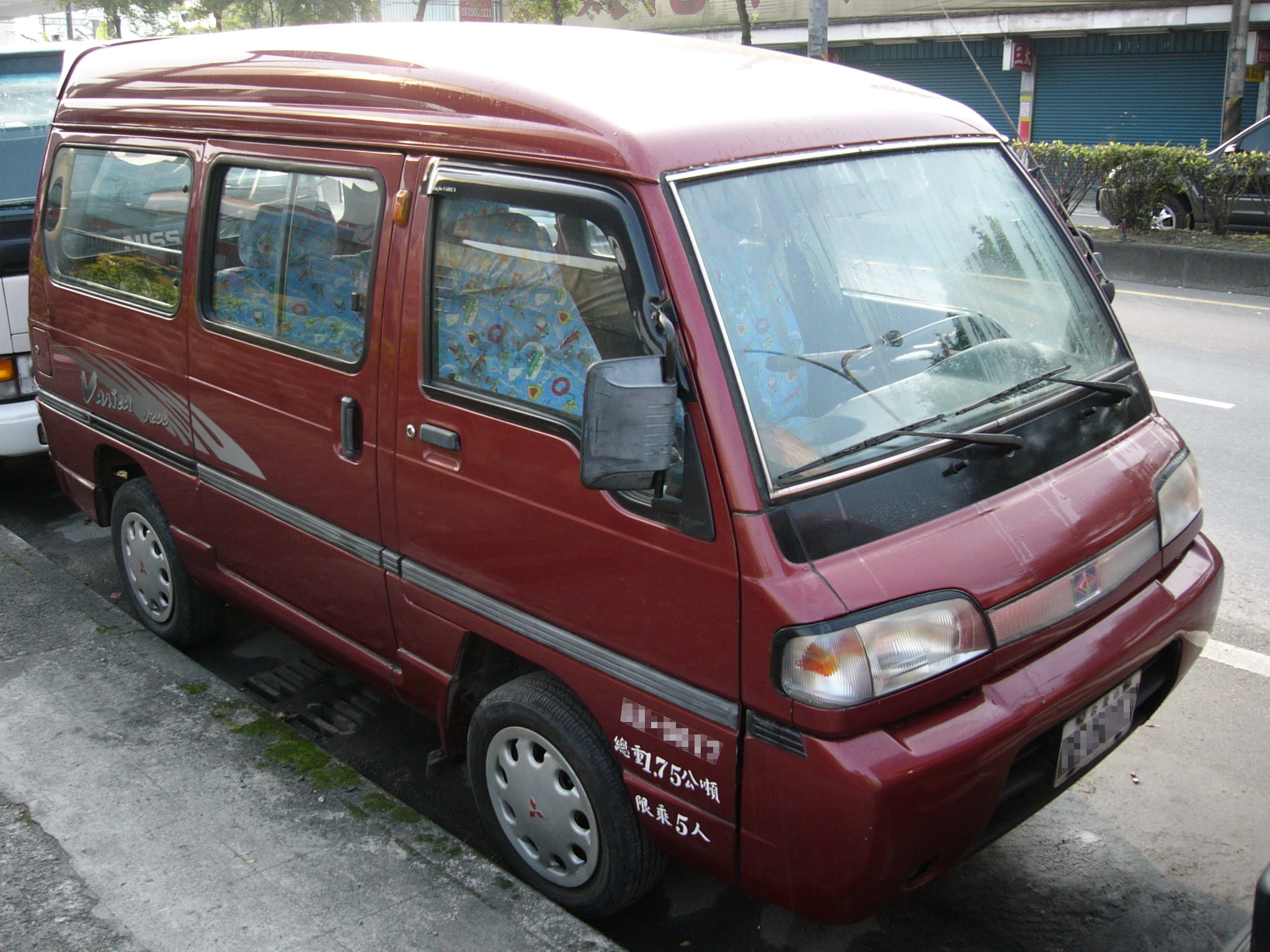
CMC Varica 1200 van

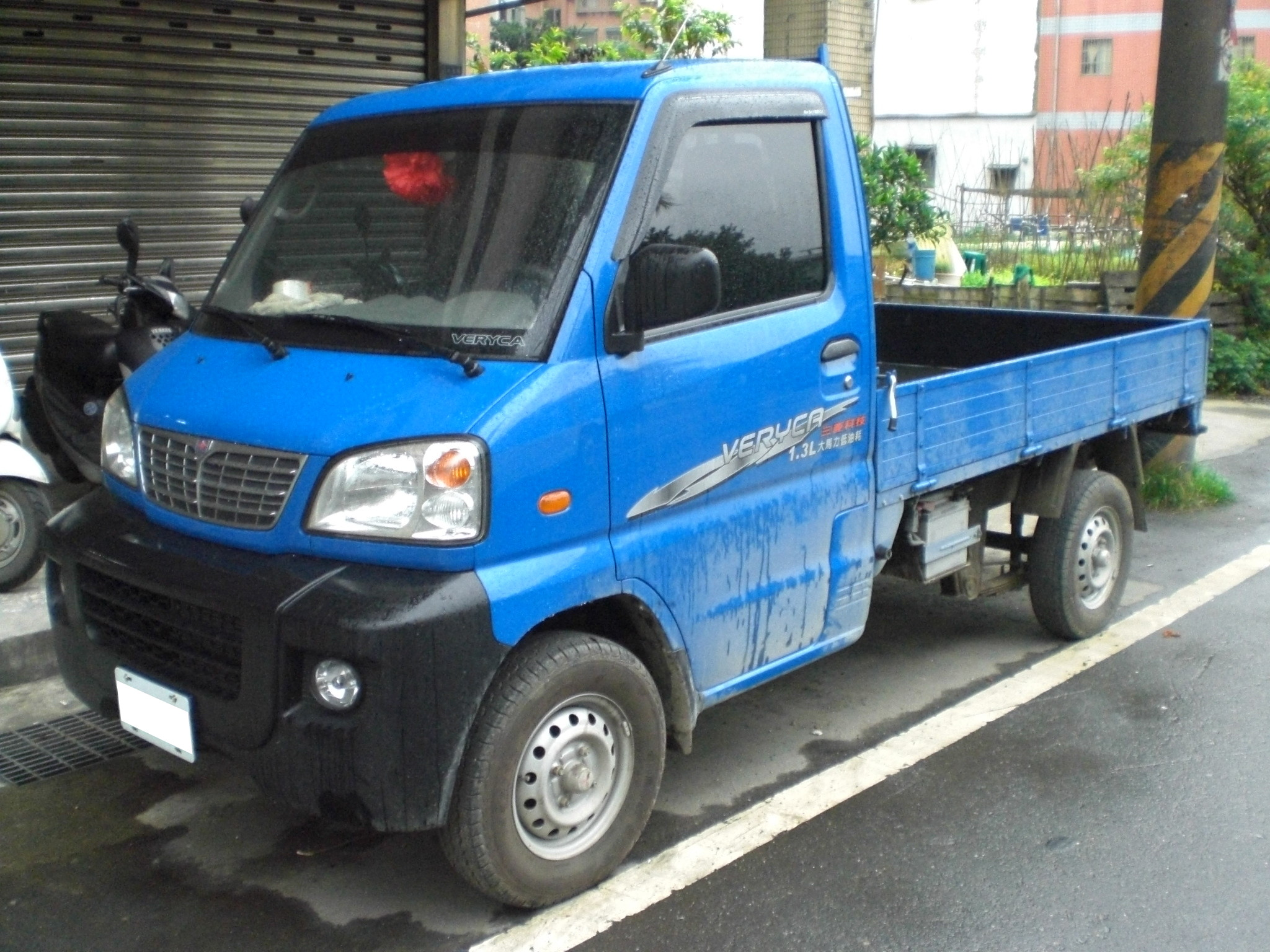
CMC Veryca 1.3L truck (1st ver.)

==== Chrysler brand vehicles ====
- Chrysler Town & Country (2005–2007)
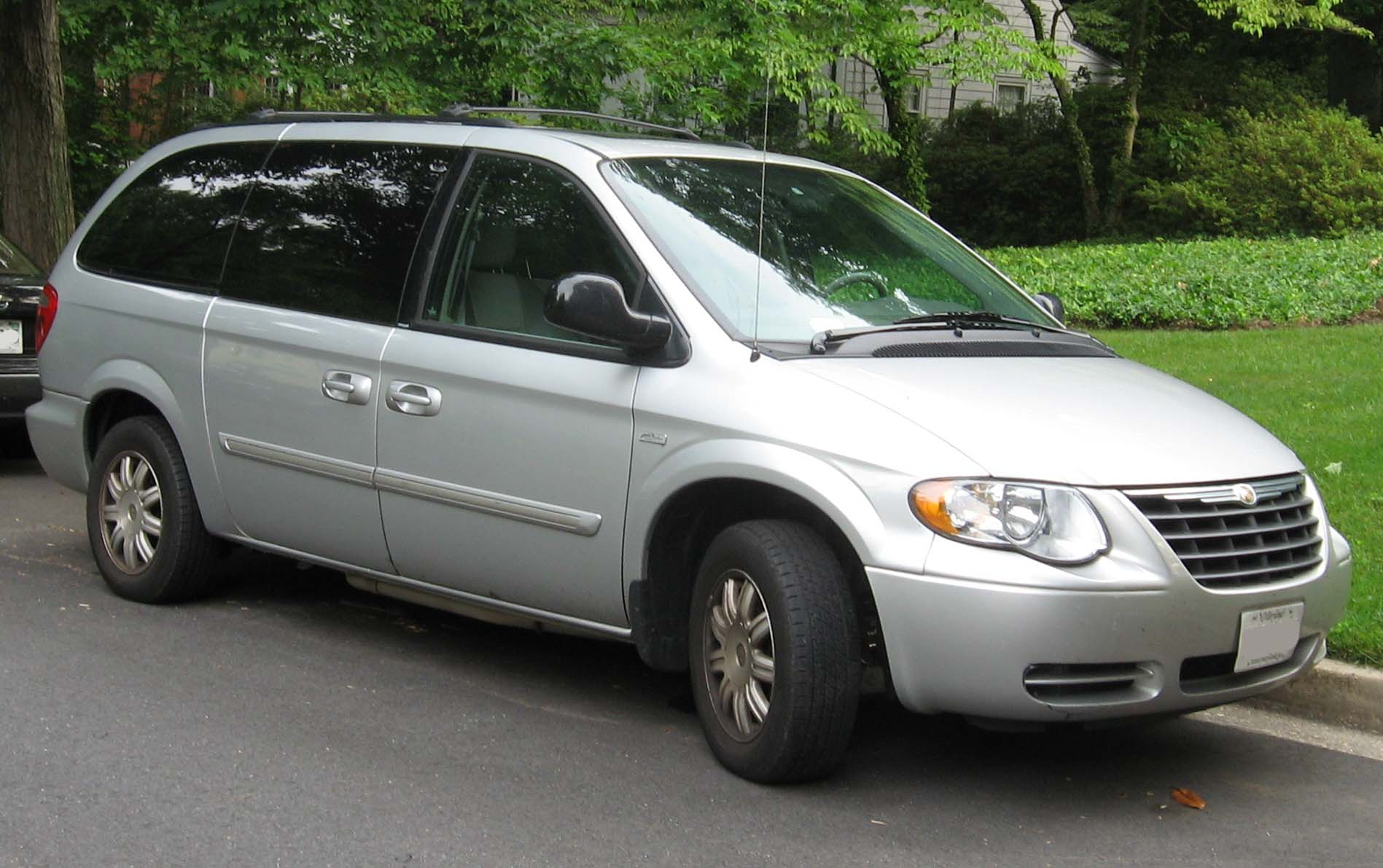
Chrysler Town and Country

==== Mitsubishi brand vehicles ====
- Mitsubishi ASX (2011–2014) (Import)
- Mitsubishi Eclipse Cross (2018–2026) (Import)
- Mitsubishi Eclipse Cross PHEV (2023–2025) (Import)
- Mitsubishi Freeca (1998–2008)
- Mitsubishi Galant (1997–2004)
- Mitsubishi Grunder (2004–2012)
- Mitsubishi Lancer (1991–2024)
- Mitsubishi Lancer Sportback (2011–2017) (Import)
- Mitsubishi Outlander PHEV (2014–2025) (Import)
- Mitsubishi Pajero (2007–2020) (Import)
- Mitsubishi Savrin (2001–2014)
- Mitsubishi Space Gear (1997–2007)
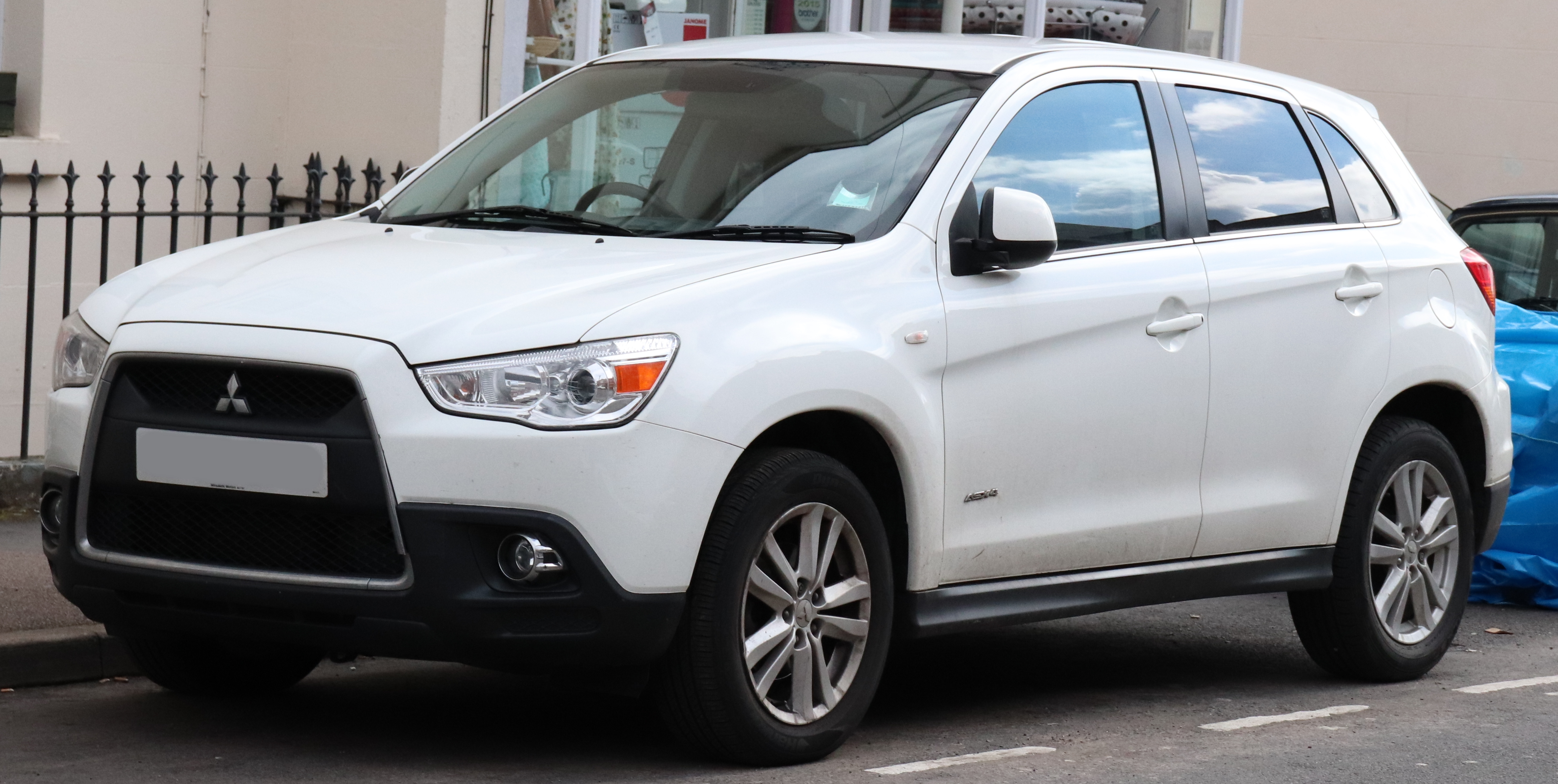
Mitsubishi ASX

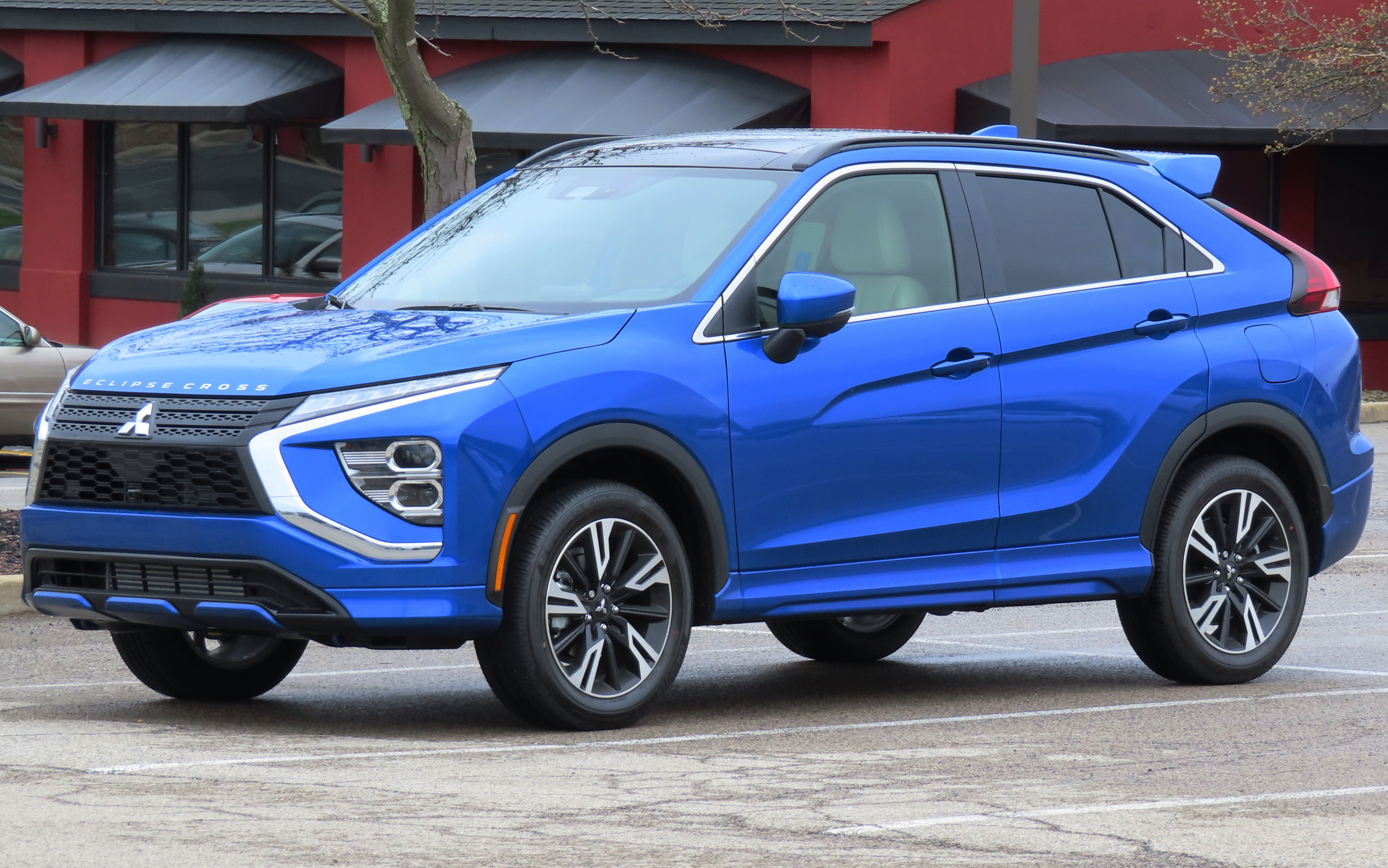
Mitsubishi Eclipse Cross

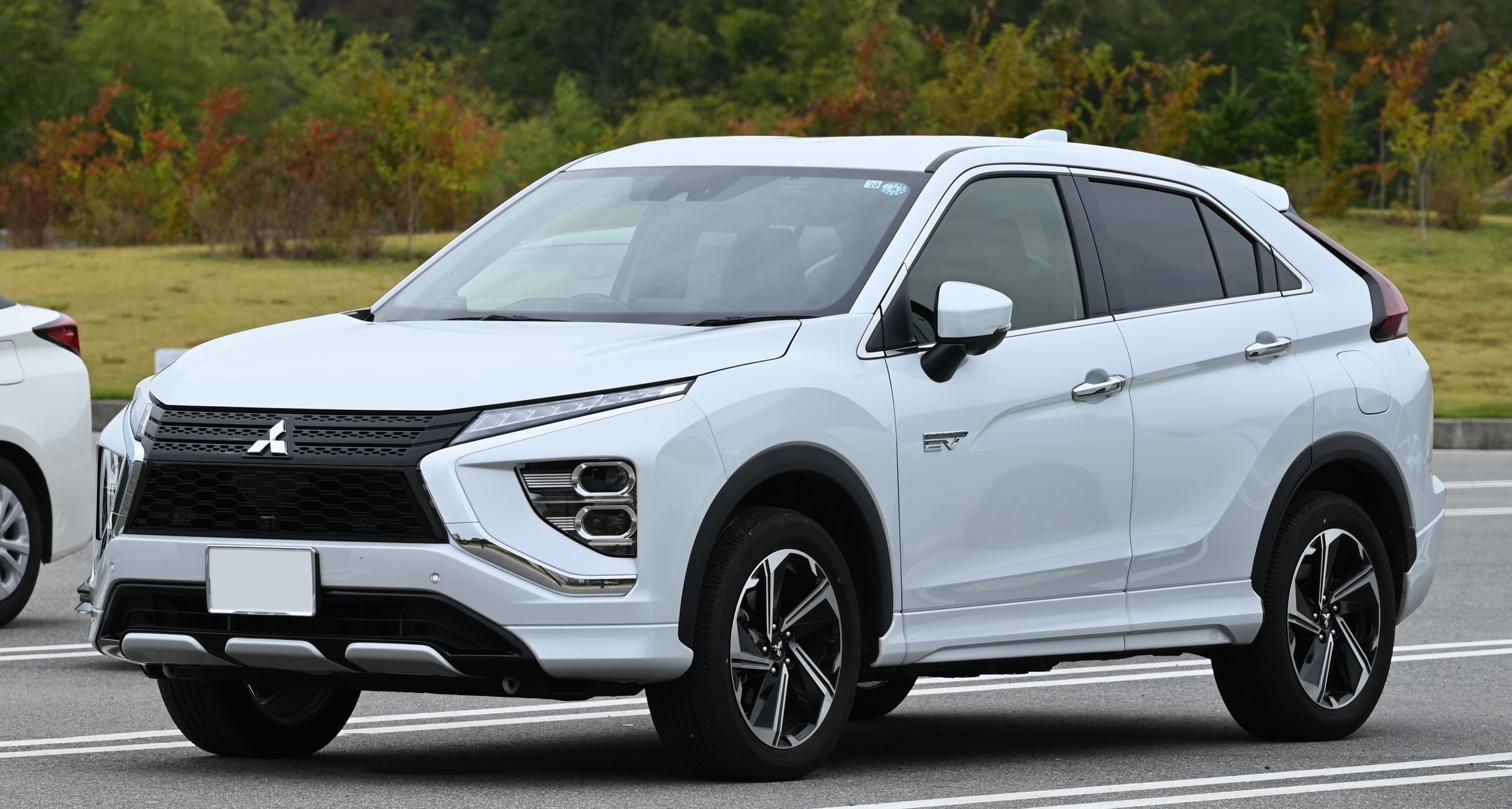
Mitsubishi Eclipse Cross PHEV

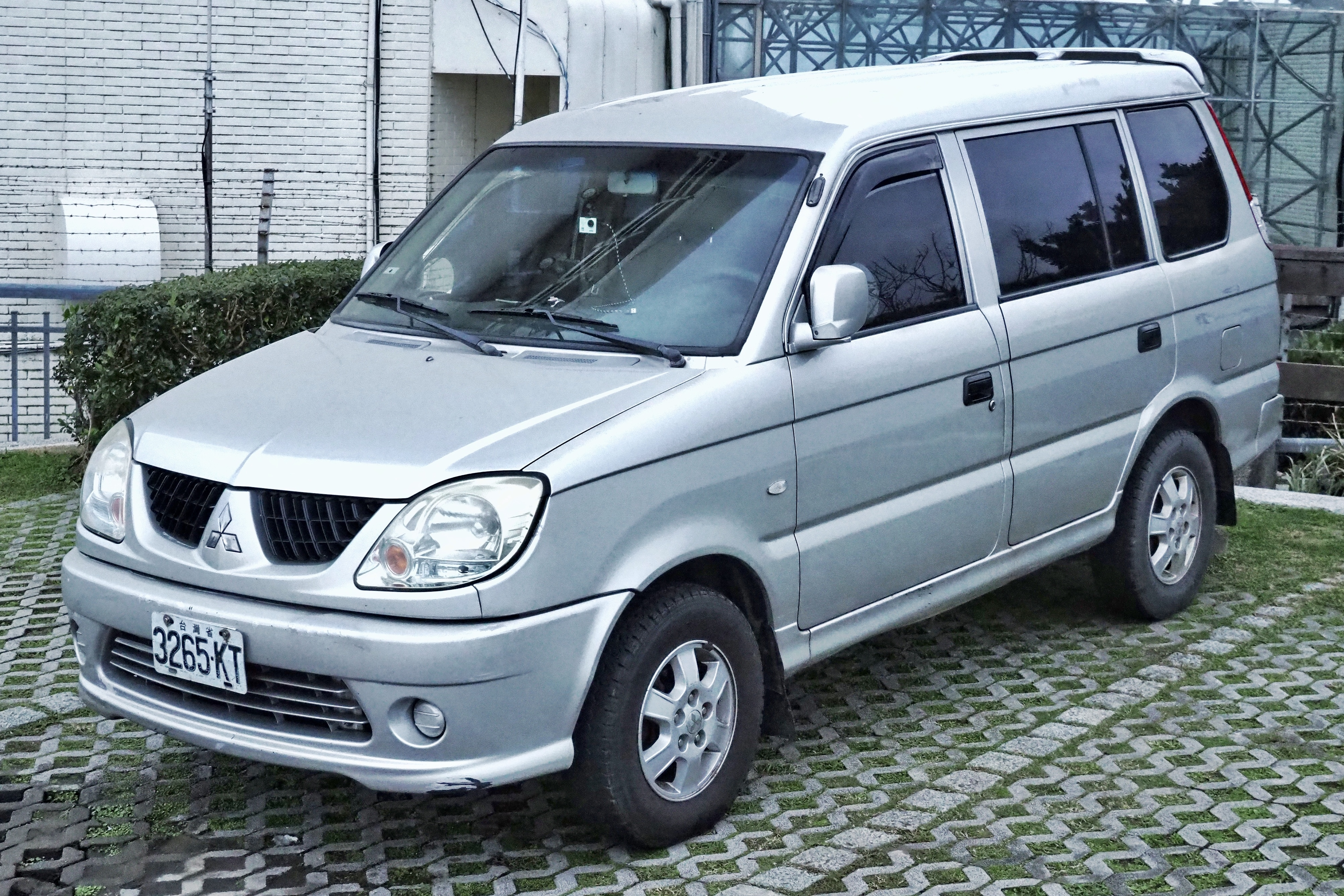
Mitsubishi Freeca

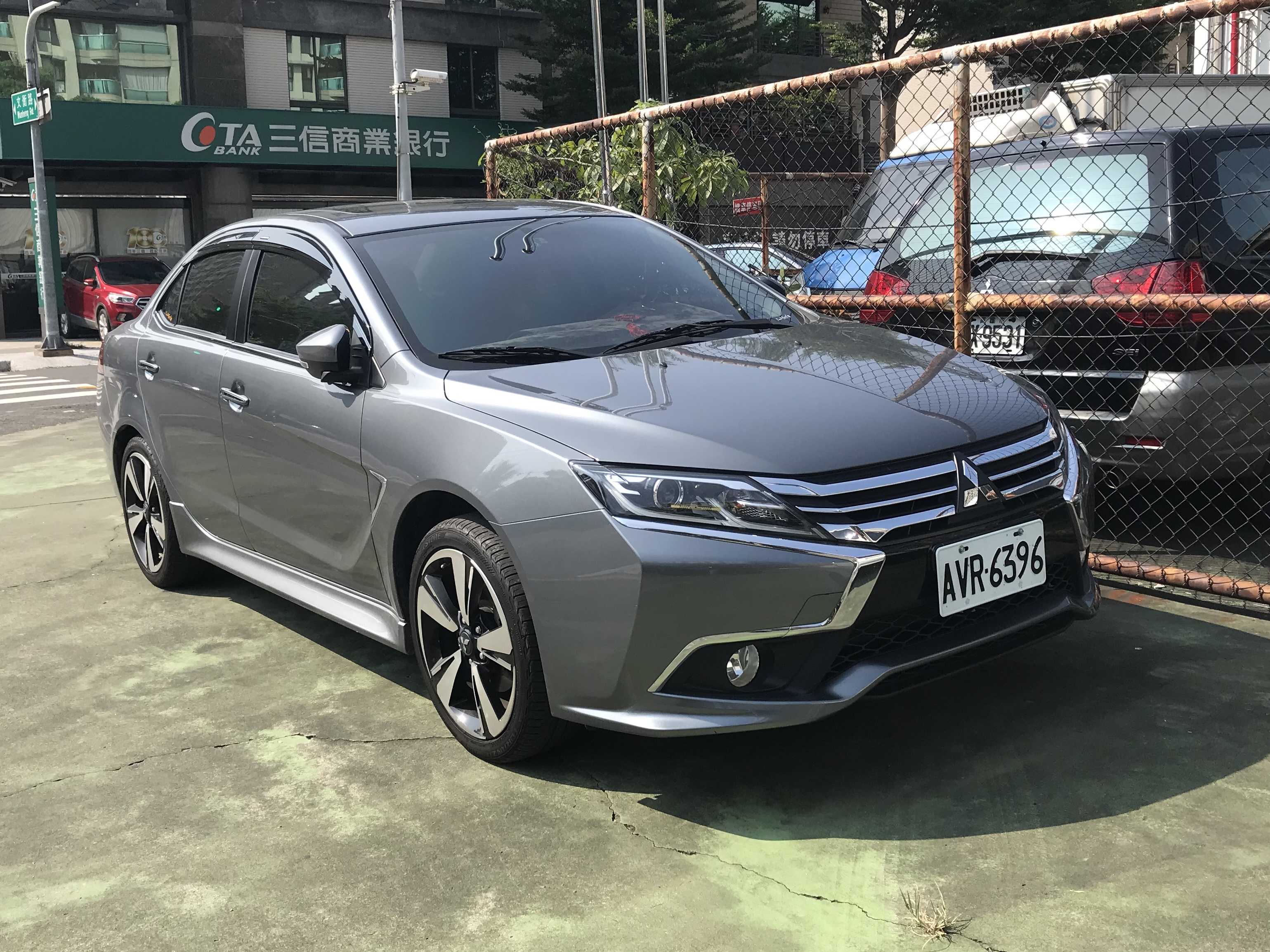
Mitsubishi Grand Lancer

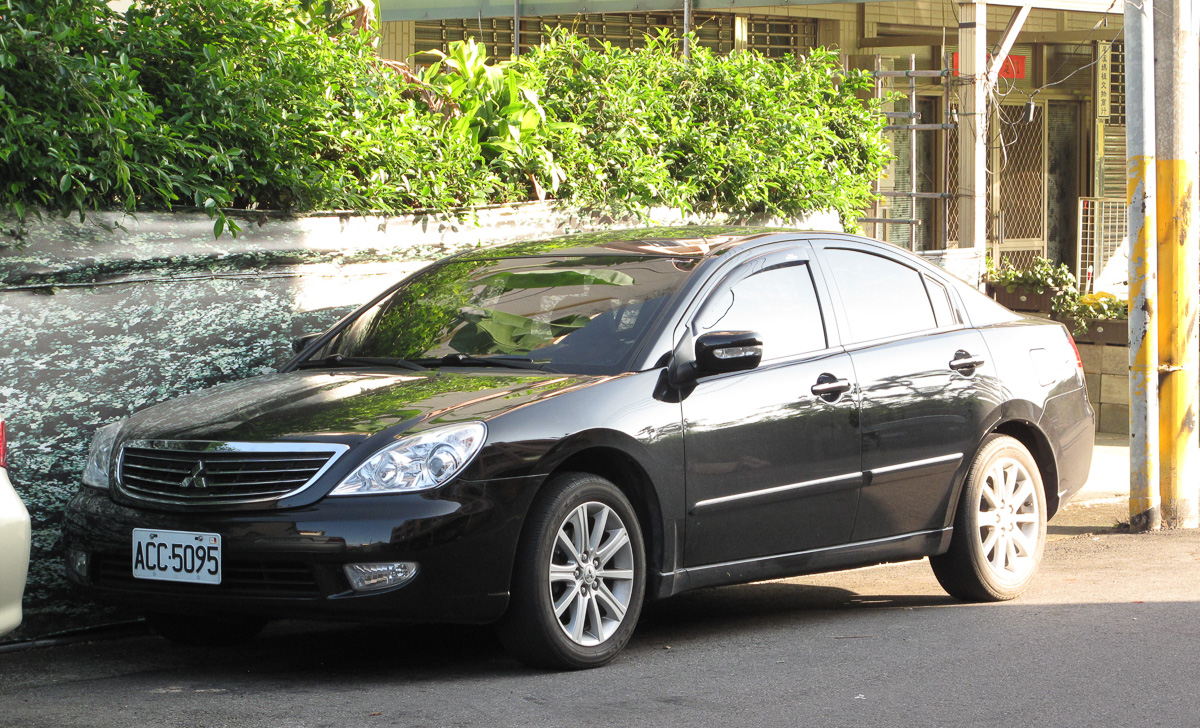
Mitsubishi Grunder

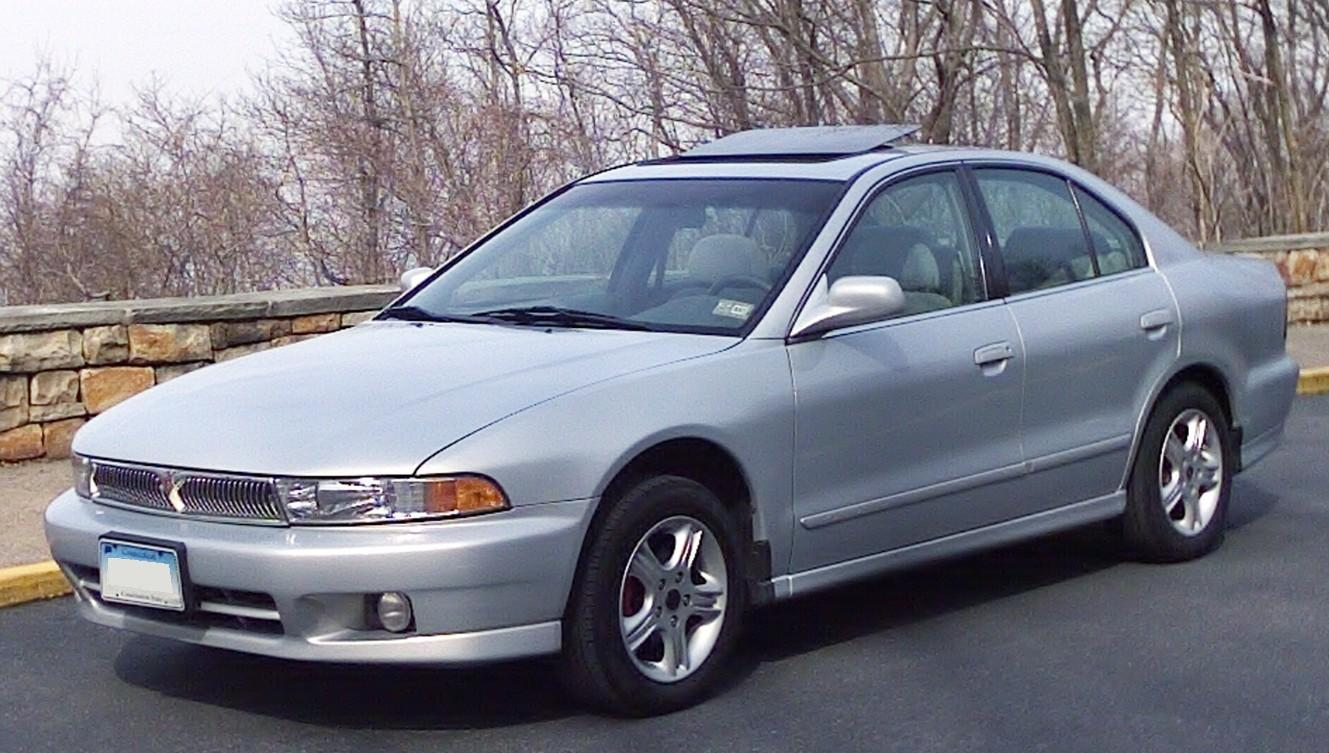
Mitsubishi Galant

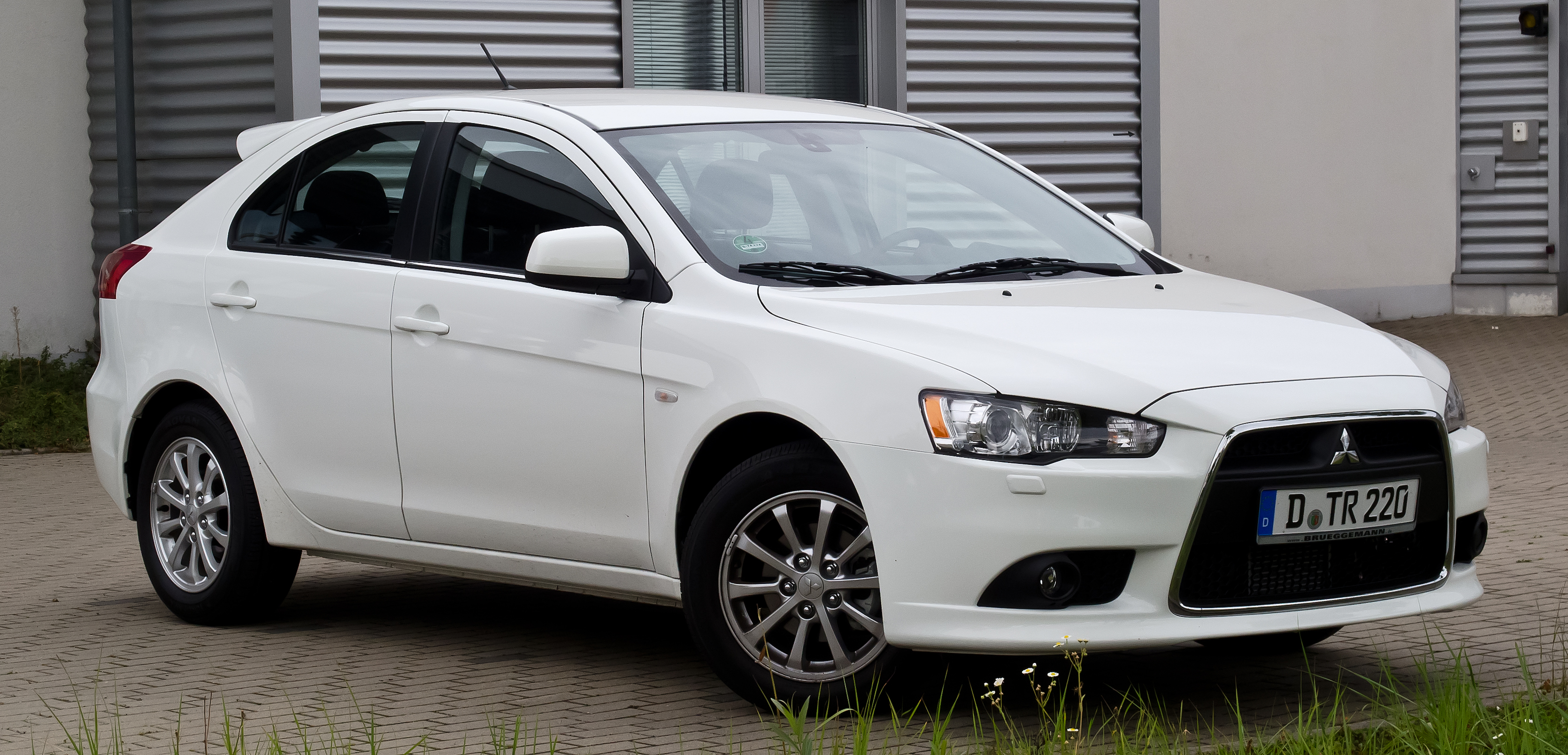
Mitsubishi Lancer Sportback

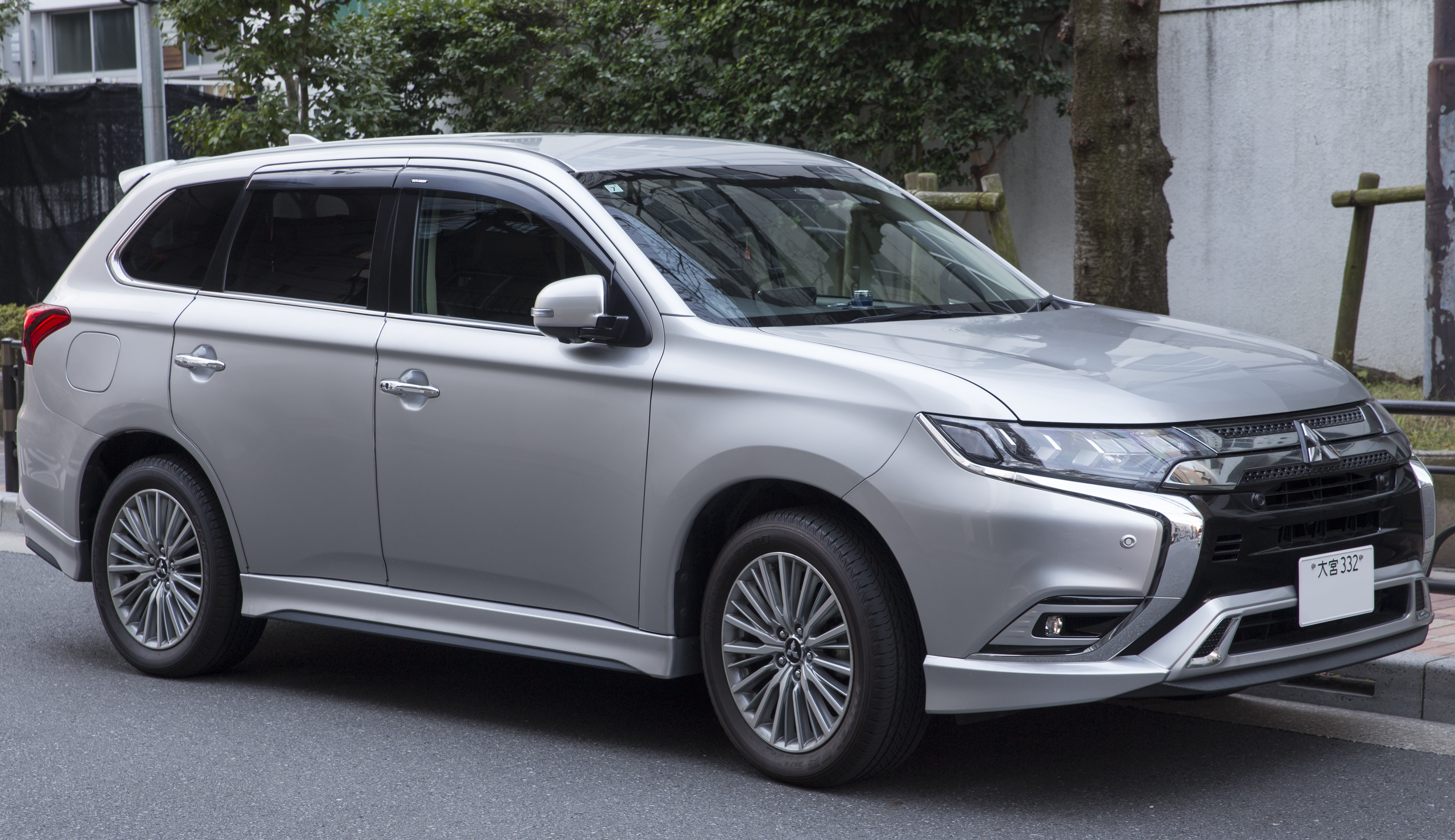
Mitsubishi Outlander PHEV

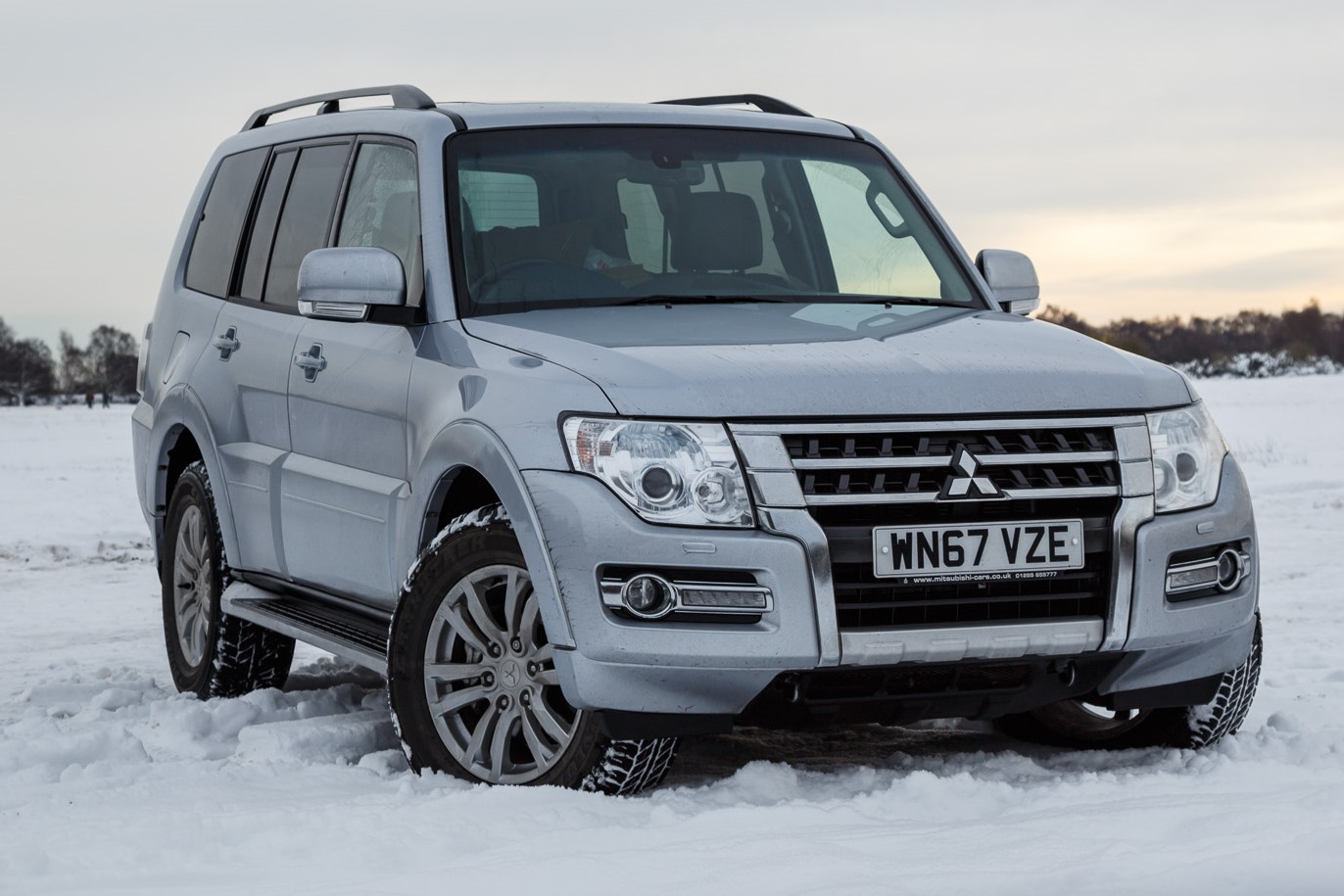
Mitsubishi Pajero

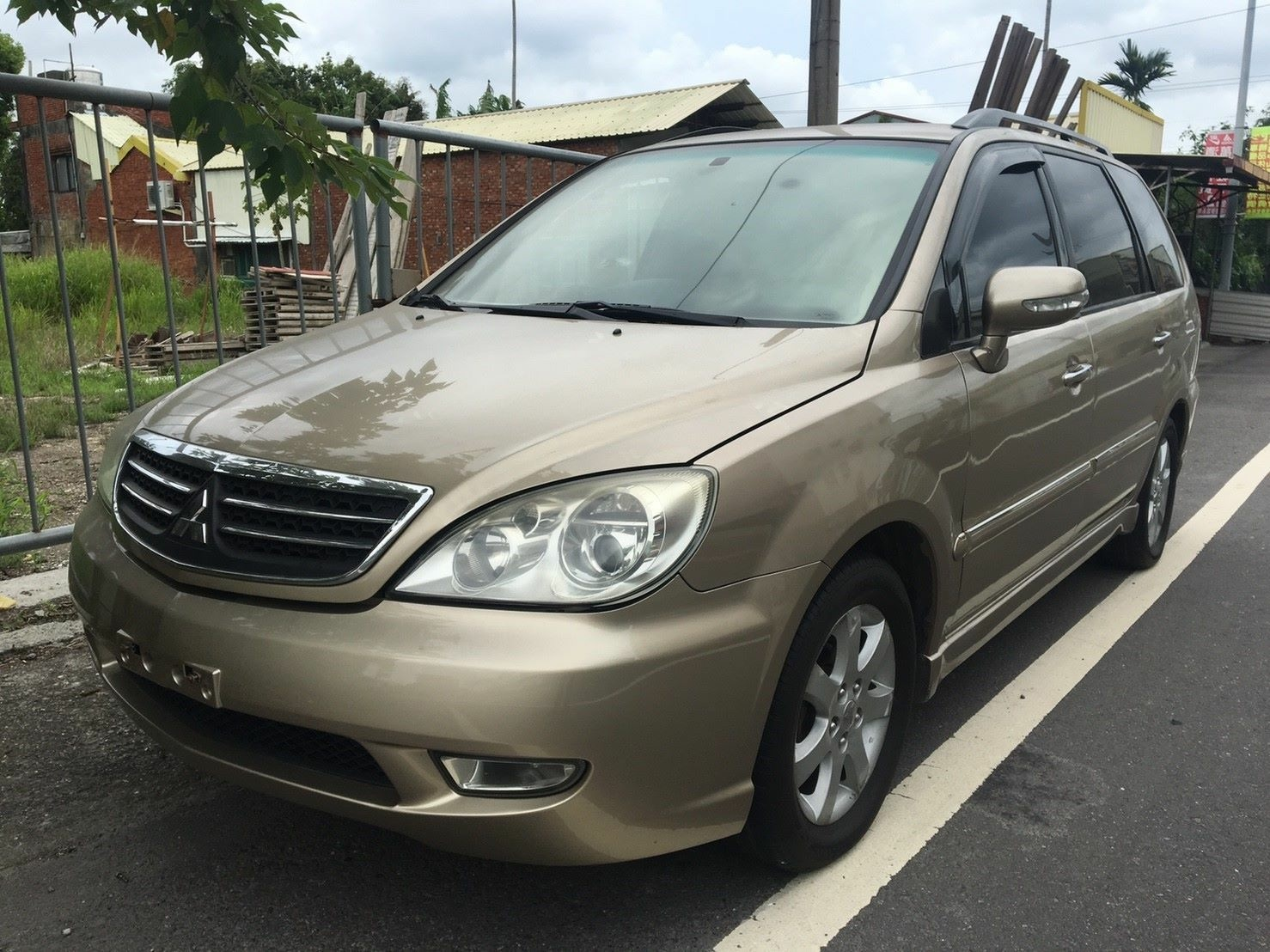
Mitsubishi Savrin

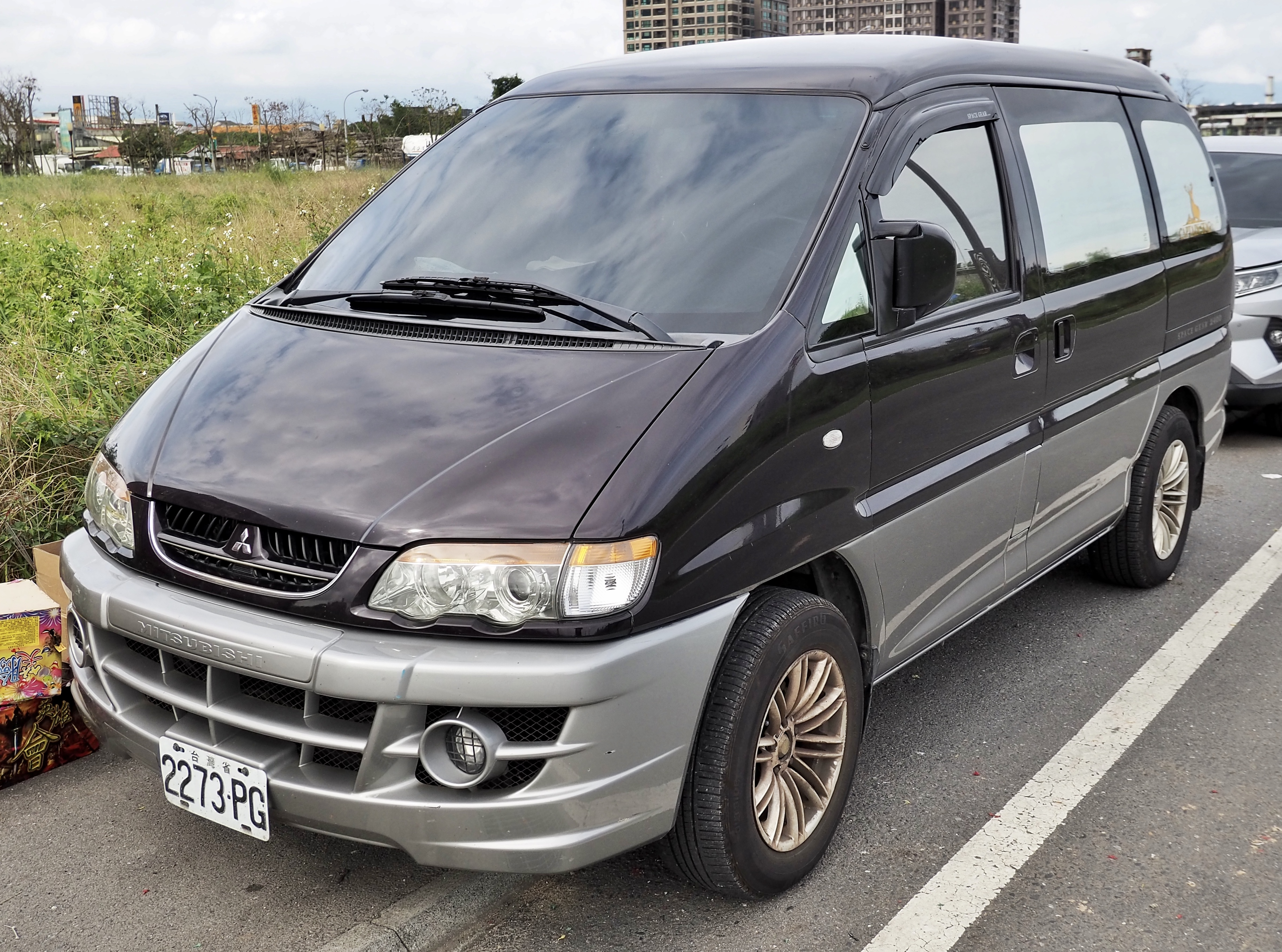
Mitsubishi Space Gear

== See also ==
- List of companies of Taiwan
- List of Taiwanese automakers
