= Joicey =

Joicey is a surname. Notable people with the name include:

- Brian Joicey (born 1945), retired English footballer
- Nicholas Joicey (born 1970), British government official
- James Joicey (disambiguation), multiple people

== See also ==
- Baron Joicey, a noble title in the Peerage of the United Kingdom
- Joice (disambiguation)
