= Joyce =

Joyce may refer to:

== People ==
- Joyce (name), list of people and fictional characters with the given name or surname
- Joyce (singer), (born 1948), Brazilian singer-songwriter

== Places ==
- Joyce, Washington, an unincorporated community in the United States
- Mount Joyce, Victoria Land, Antarctica
- Joyce Peak, Ross Island, off the coast of Victoria Land
- Joyce Glacier, Victoria Land
- Lake Joyce, Victoria Land
- Joyce Country, a region in counties Galway and Mayo in Ireland
- 5418 Joyce, a main-belt asteroid

== Business ==
- Joyce, house brand of Hong Kong company Joyce Boutique
- JB Joyce & Co, an English clockmaker
- Joyces 365, a supermarket chain based in Galway, Ireland
- Amstrad PCW personal computer, sold under license in Europe as the "Joyce"

== Other uses ==
- List of storms named Joyce, multiple storms
- USS Joyce, a destroyer escort that served in World War II
- Joyce (programming language)
- Joyce Theater, in the Manhattan borough of New York City in the United States
- Joyce Foundation, a charitable foundation based in Chicago, Illinois, United States

== See also ==
- Joice (disambiguation)
