= Joice =

Joice may refer to:

- Changan Joice, car by Chinee manufacturer Changan
- Joice Icefall, Antarctica
- Joice Island, California
- Joice (name)
- Kia Joice, a MPV made by Korean automaker KIA Motors
- Joice, Iowa

== See also ==
- Joyce (disambiguation)
