= Mitsubishi Savrin =

Compact MPV

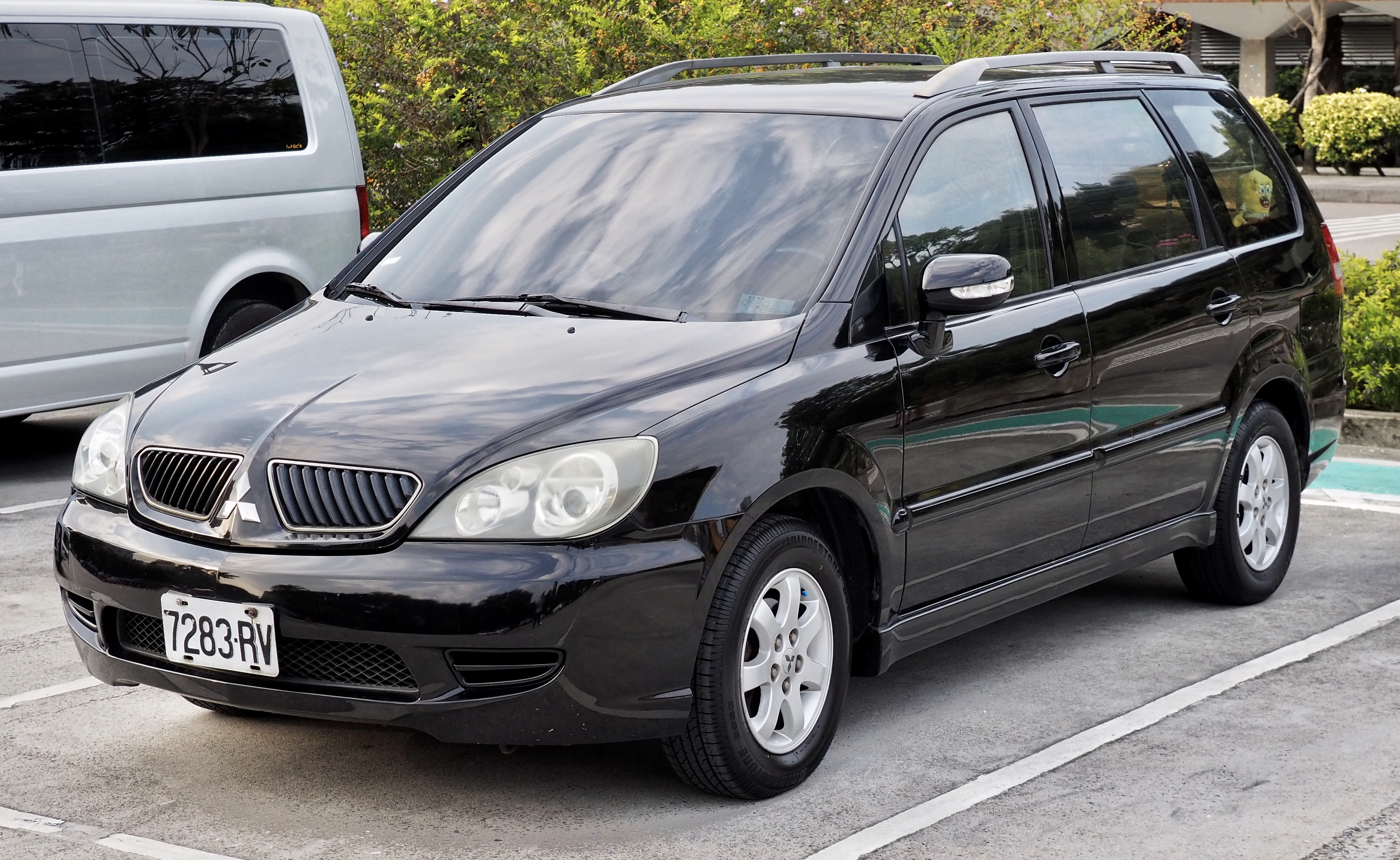

Overview
- Manufacturer: Mitsubishi Motors
- Also called: Mitsubishi Chariot Grandis
- Production: 2001–2014

Body and chassis
- Class: Compact MPV
- Body style: 5-door station wagon
- Layout: Front-engine, front-wheel-drive

The Mitsubishi Savrin is a compact MPV produced and sold in Taiwan by China Motor Corporation and Japanese automaker Mitsubishi Motors. The first generation was a locally assembled rebadged Chariot Grandis, while the second generation, introduced in June 2004, is actually a heavily revised facelift of the same Chariot Grandis platform.

== First generation (2001–2004) ==
Mitsubishi Savrin
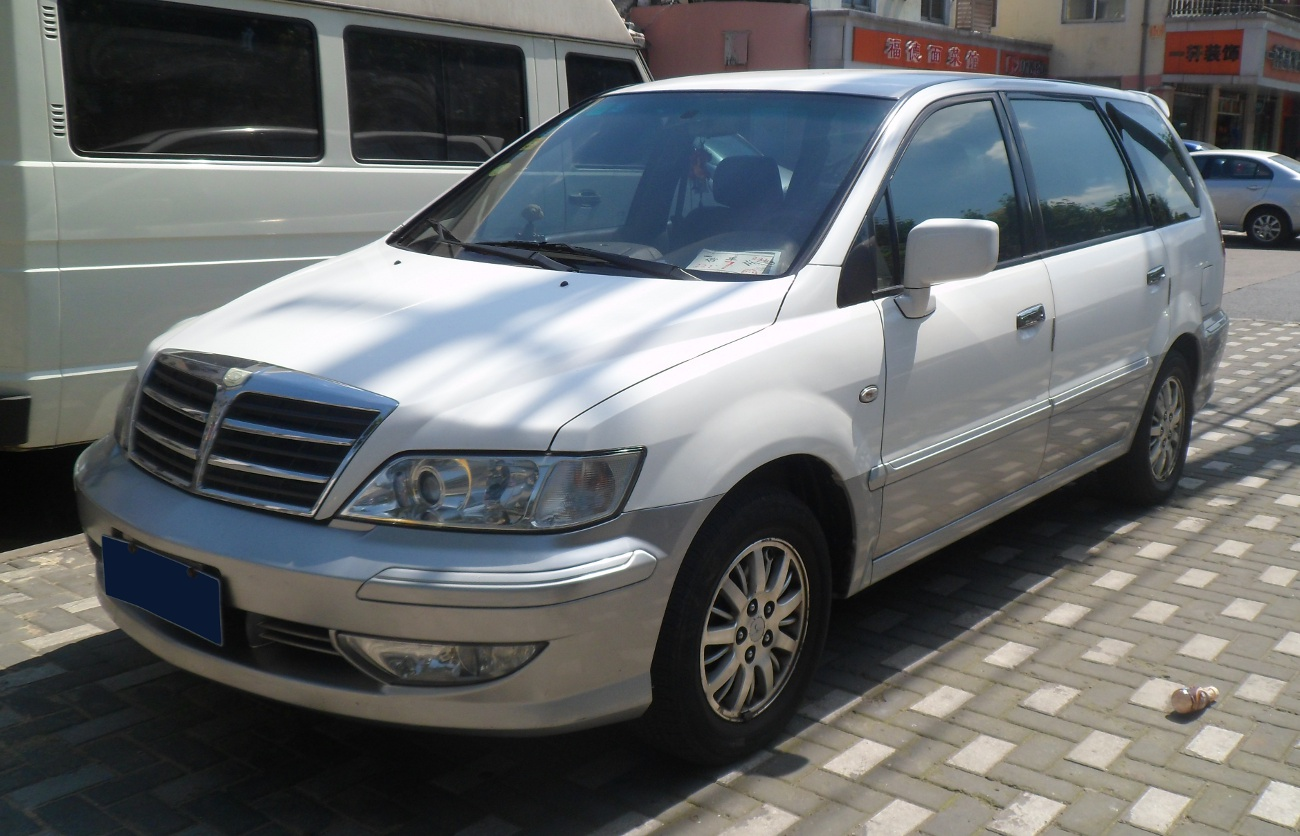
- Soueast Sovereign (China)

Overview
- Production: 2001–2004
- Assembly: Taiwan: Yangmei (China Motor Corporation); China: Fuzhou (Soueast)

Powertrain
- Engine: 2.0 L 4G63 I4
- Transmission: INVECS-II 4-speed semi auto

Dimensions
- Wheelbase: 2,780 mm (109.4 in)
- Length: 4,700 mm (185.0 in)
- Width: 1,780 mm (70.1 in)
- Height: 1,690 mm (66.5 in)

The first generation Mitsubishi Savrin in Taiwan was a locally assembled badge-engineered Chariot Grandis produced and sold by China Motor Corporation. Due to the agreement with Soueast Motors of mainland China, the same version of the rebadged Mitsubishi Chariot Grandis was rebadged as the Soueast Sovereign in mainland China.

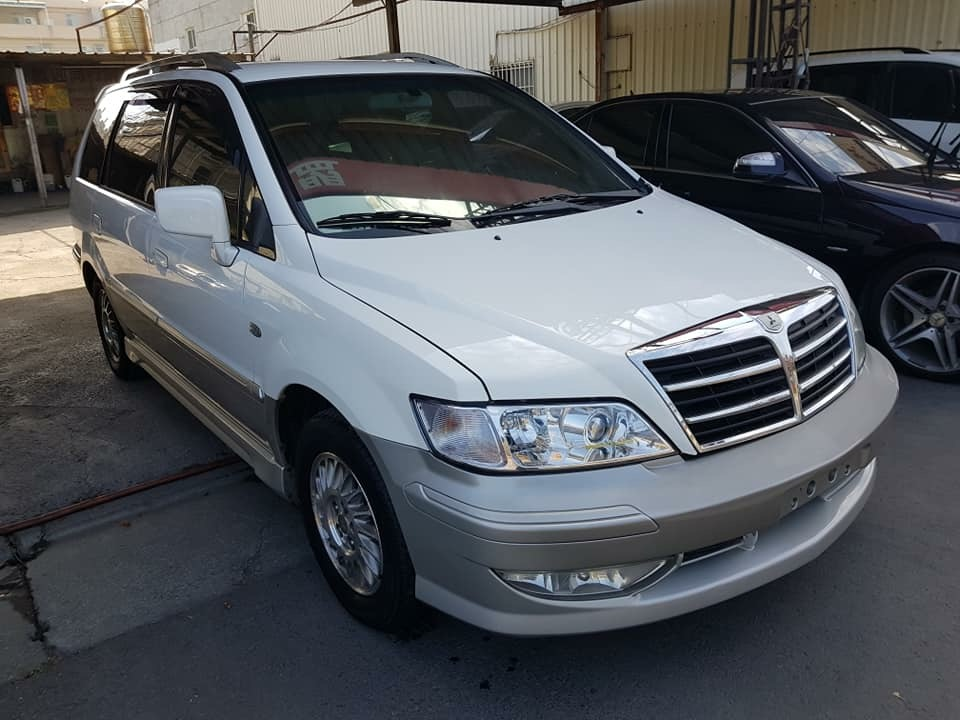
2001–2004 Mitsubishi Savrin

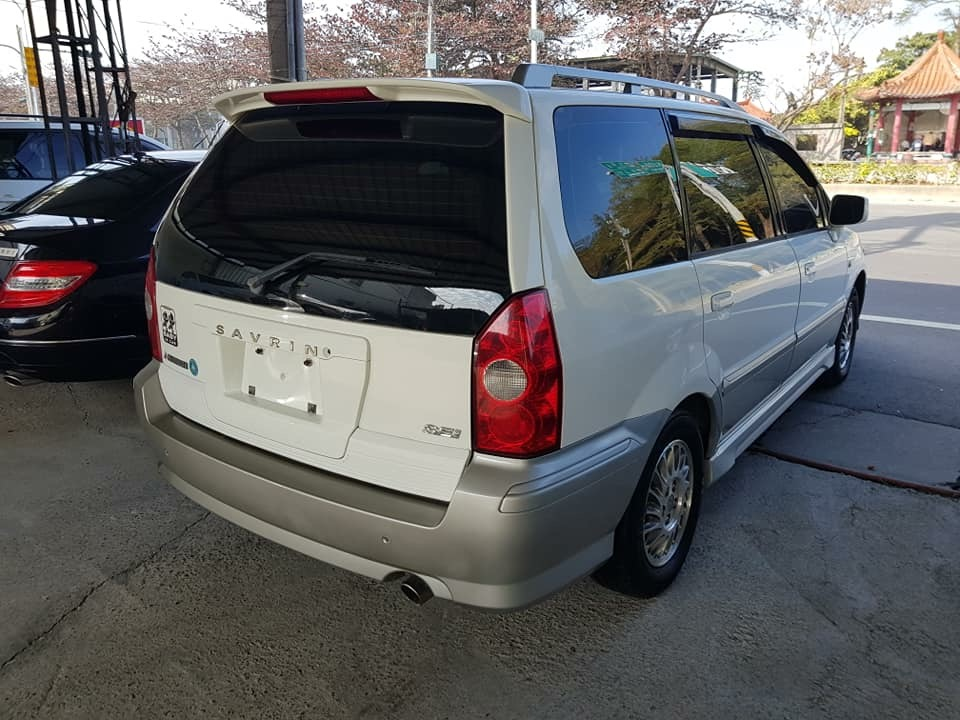
2001–2004 Mitsubishi Savrin

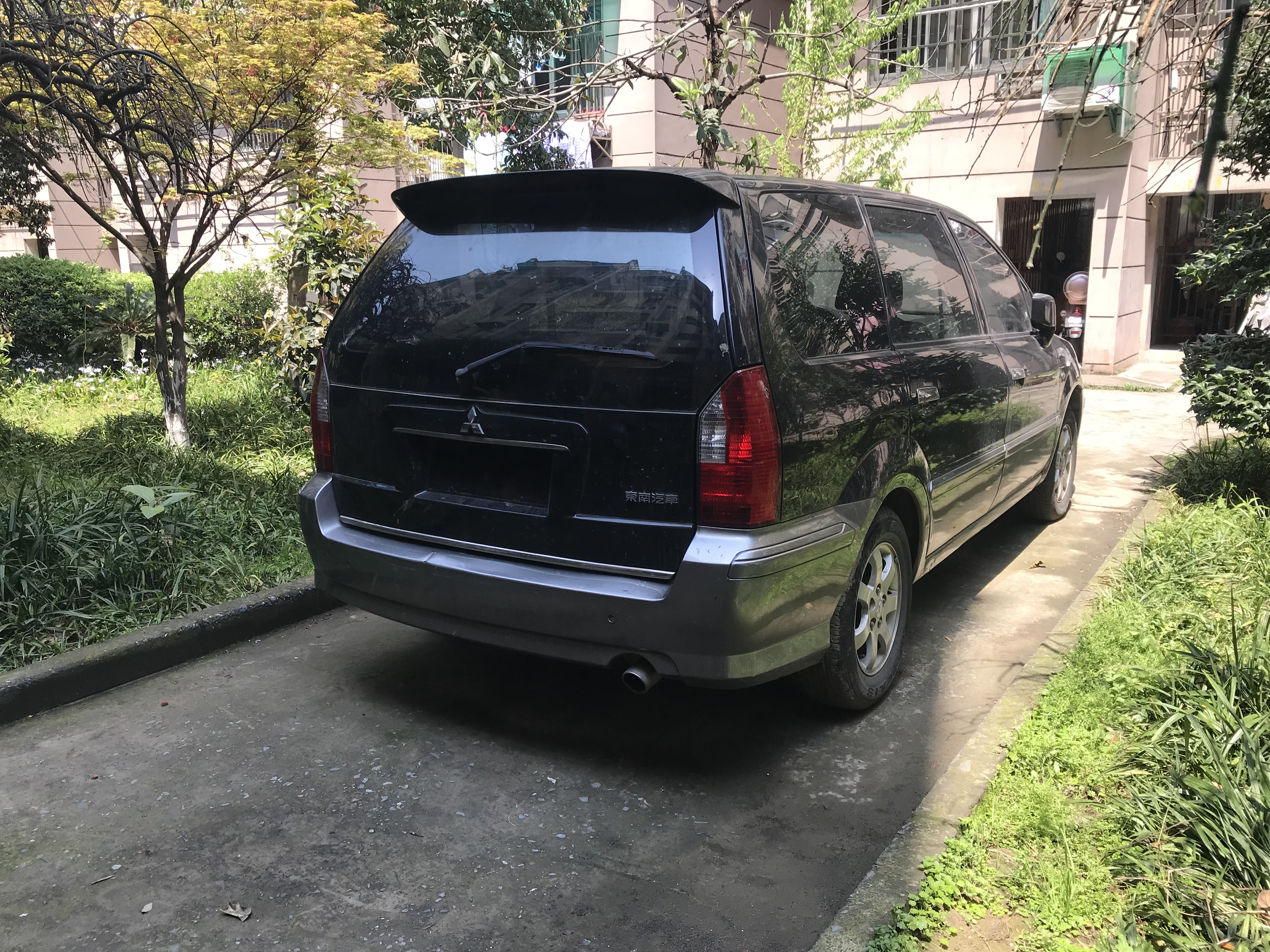
2001–2004 Soueast Sovereign rear

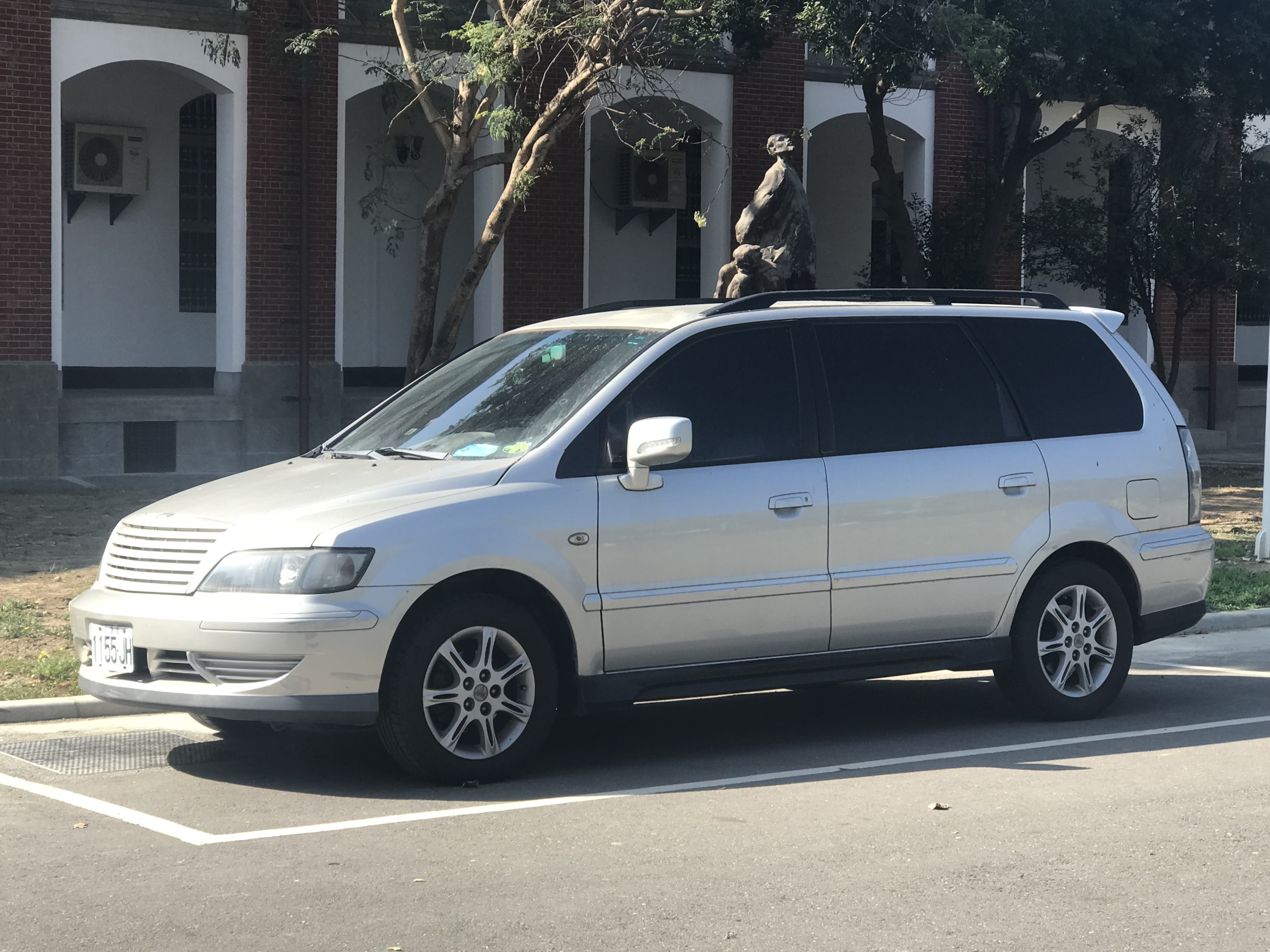
2001–2004 Mitsubishi Savrin Inspire

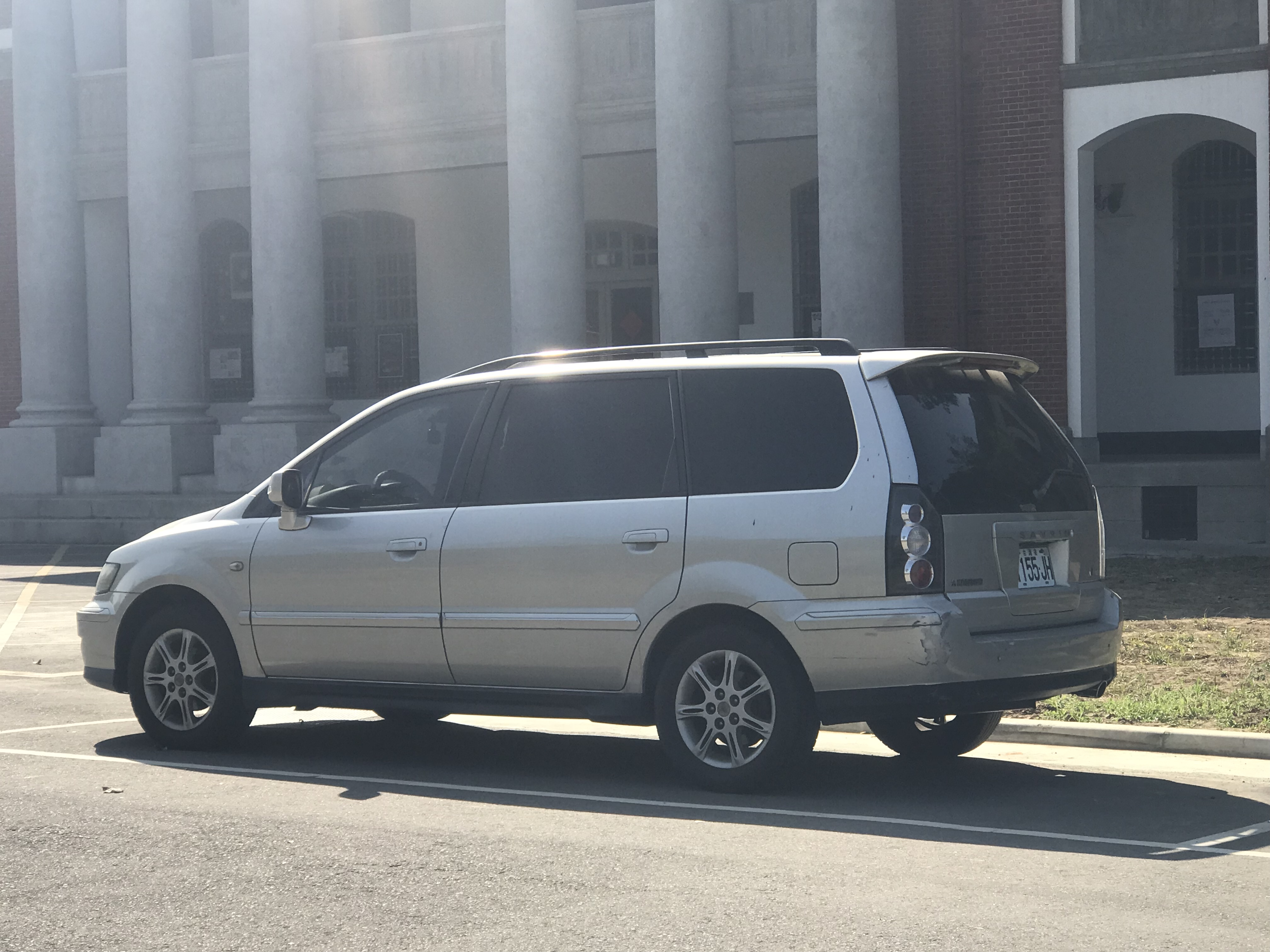
2001–2004 Mitsubishi Savrin Inspire

== Second generation (2004–2014) ==
Mitsubishi Savrin
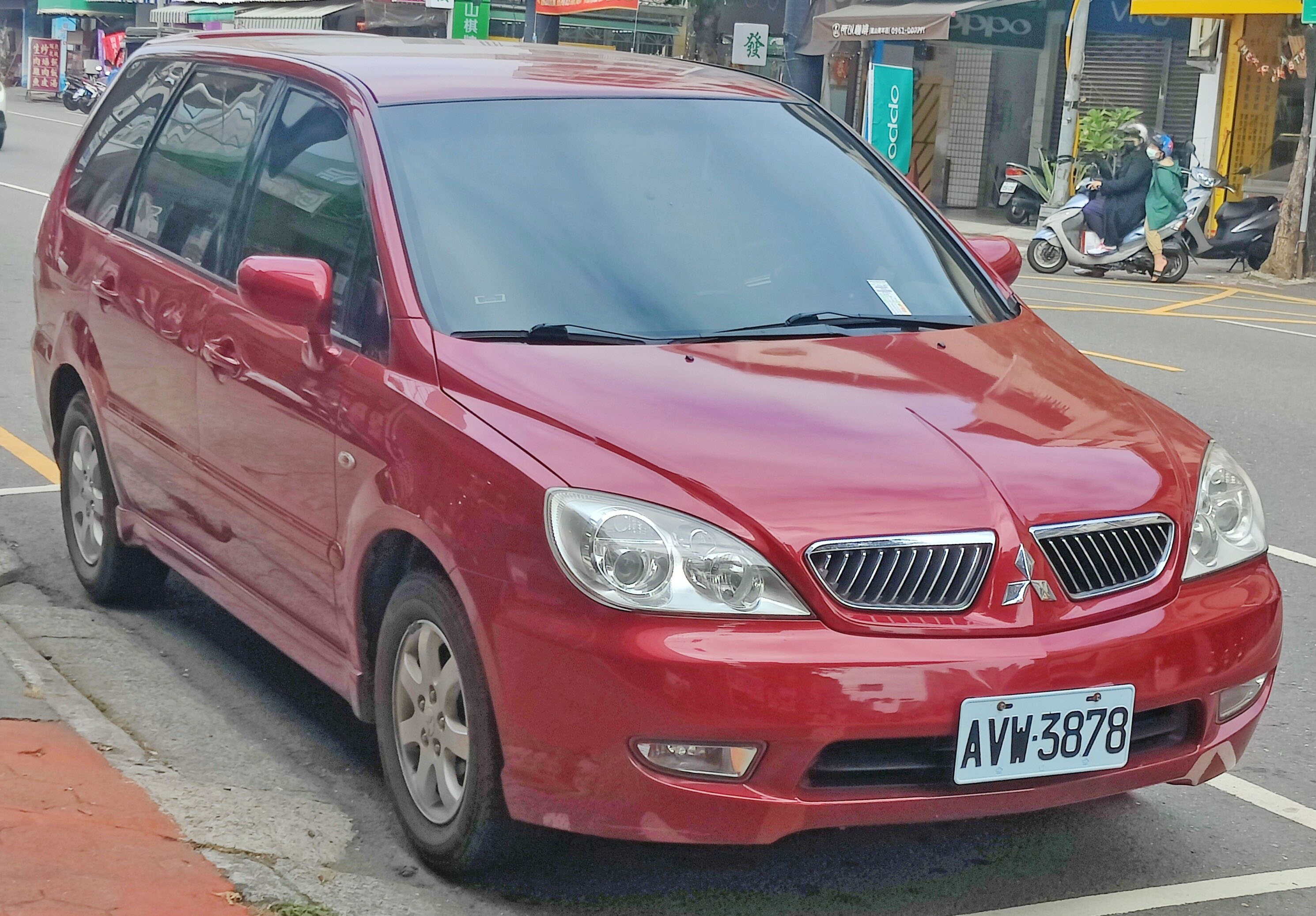
- Pre-facelift

Overview
- Production: 2004–2014
- Assembly: Taiwan: Yangmei (China Motor Corporation)

Powertrain
- Engine: 2.0 L 4G63 I4; 2.4 L 4G69 MIVEC I4
- Transmission: INVECS-II 4-speed semi auto

Dimensions
- Wheelbase: 2,780 mm (109.4 in)
- Length: 4,700 mm (185.0 in)
- Width: 1,780 mm (70.1 in)
- Height: 1,690 mm (66.5 in)

The second generation Mitsubishi Savrin debuted in 2004 featuring redesigned front and rear fascia. The second generation Mitsubishi Savrin was sold in Taiwan only, and received another facelift in 2009 with a new grille, new tail lamps, and a redesigned rear bumper.

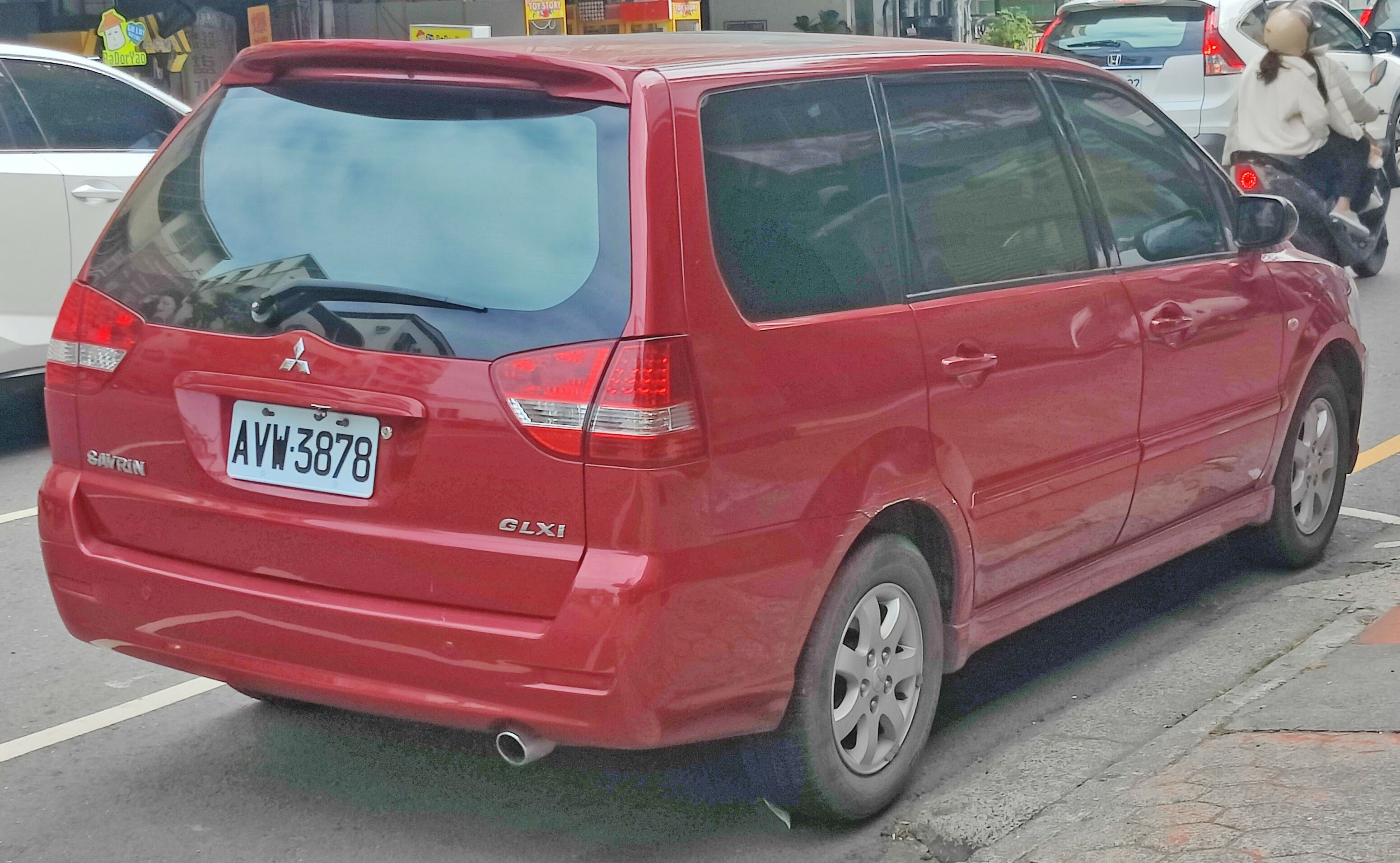
Rear view

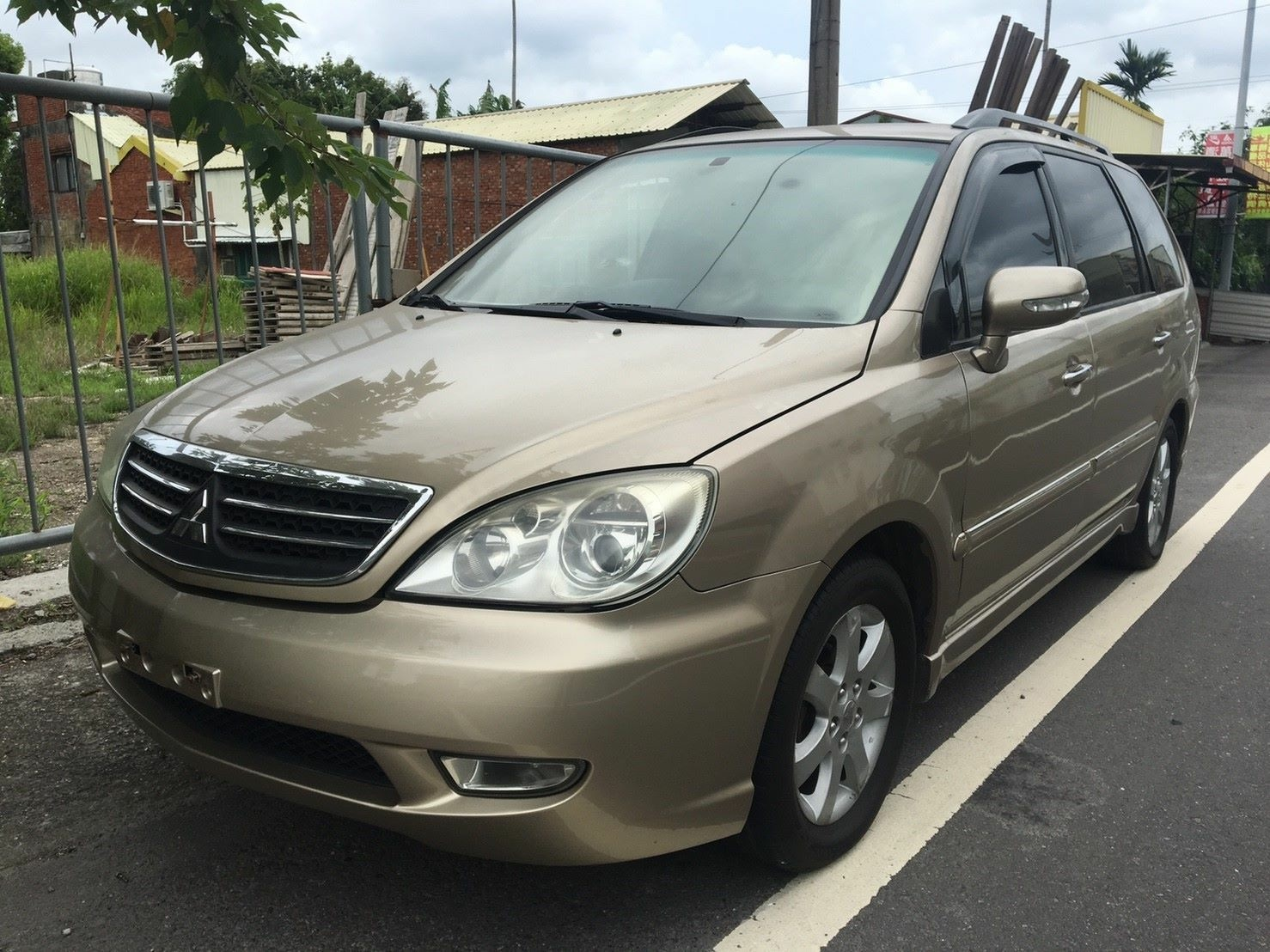
Facelift

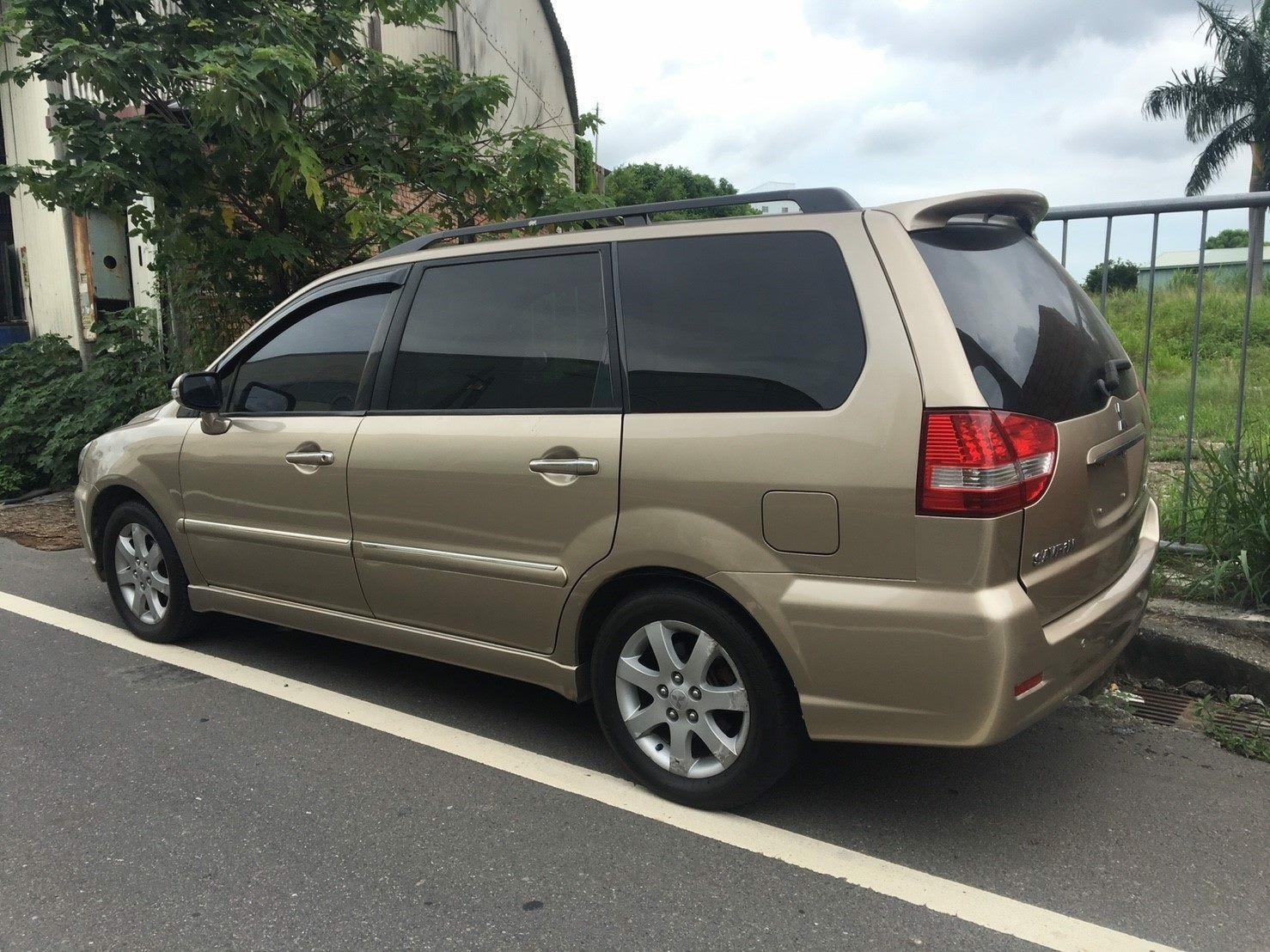
Rear view

== Annual production and sales ==
| Year | Production | Sales |
|---|---|---|
| 2001 | 3,191 | 1,574 |
| 2002 | 17,267 | 18,395 |
| 2003 | 22,637 | 21,506 |
| 2004 | 17,576 | 16,325 |
| 2005 | 13,507 | 13,018 |
| 2006 | 5,660 | 6,677 |
| 2007 | 3,663 | 3,870 |

(source: Facts & Figures 2005, Facts & Figures 2008, Mitsubishi Motors website)
