= Mitsubishi Chariot =

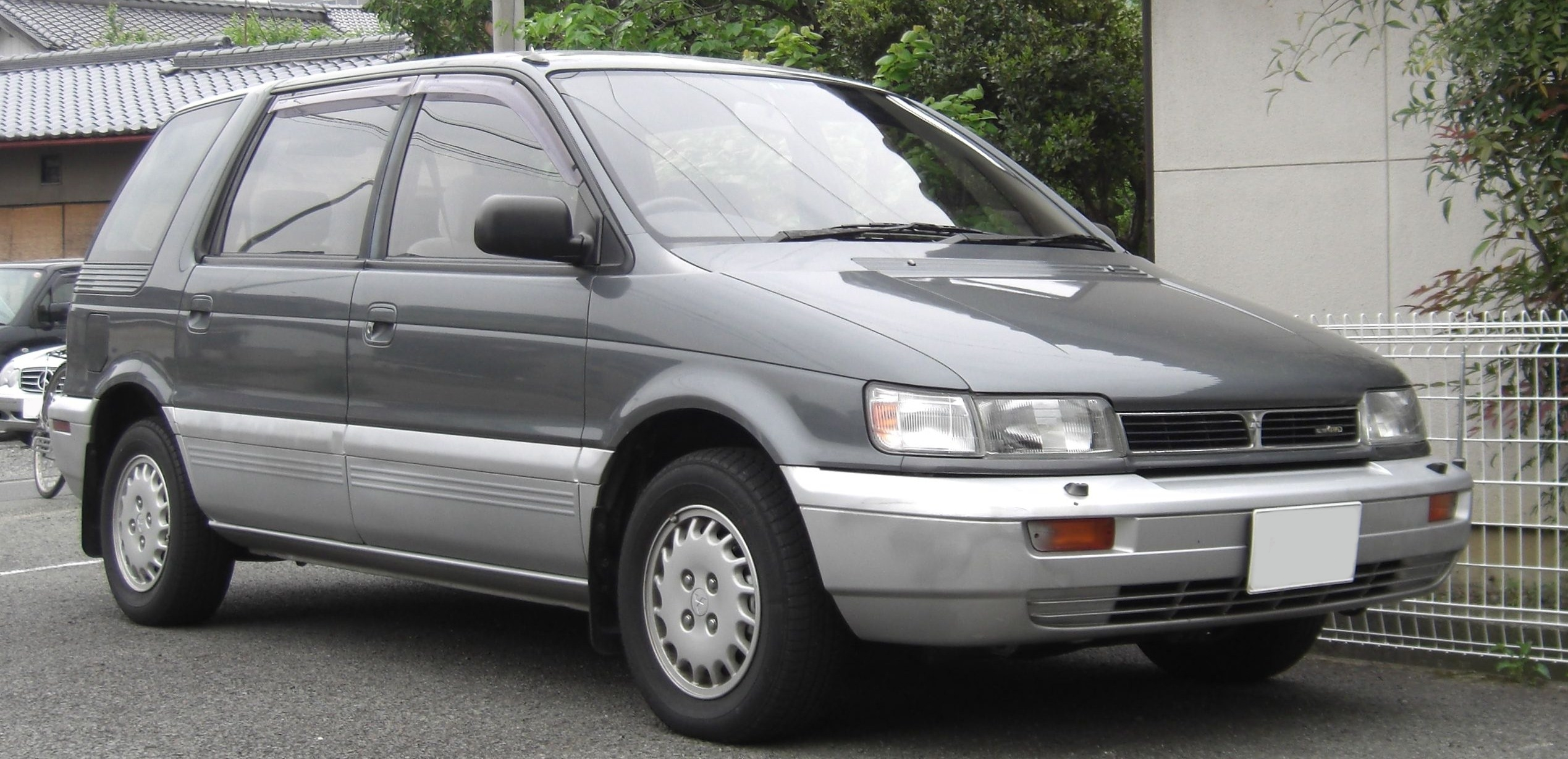
- 1991–1994 Mitsubishi Chariot

Overview
- Manufacturer: Mitsubishi
- Production: 1983–2003

Body and chassis
- Class: Compact MPV

Chronology
- Predecessor: Mitsubishi Galant wagon
- Successor: Mitsubishi Grandis

The Mitsubishi Chariot is an automobile manufactured and marketed by Mitsubishi from 1983 to 2003. It is a small multi-purpose vehicle (MPV). Based on the SSW concept car first exhibited at the 23rd Tokyo Motor Show in 1979, the MPV derives its nameplate from chariots used by the ancient Greek and Roman empires.

Internationally, the MPV has been marketed as the Mitsubishi Space Wagon, Mitsubishi Nimbus and Mitsubishi Expo — and as the Dodge and Plymouth Colt Vista Wagon, as captive imports in North America, and as the Eagle Vista Wagon in Canada. It has also been manufactured under license as the Hyundai Santamo and Mitsubishi Savrin in Asia.

== First generation (1983) ==
First generation
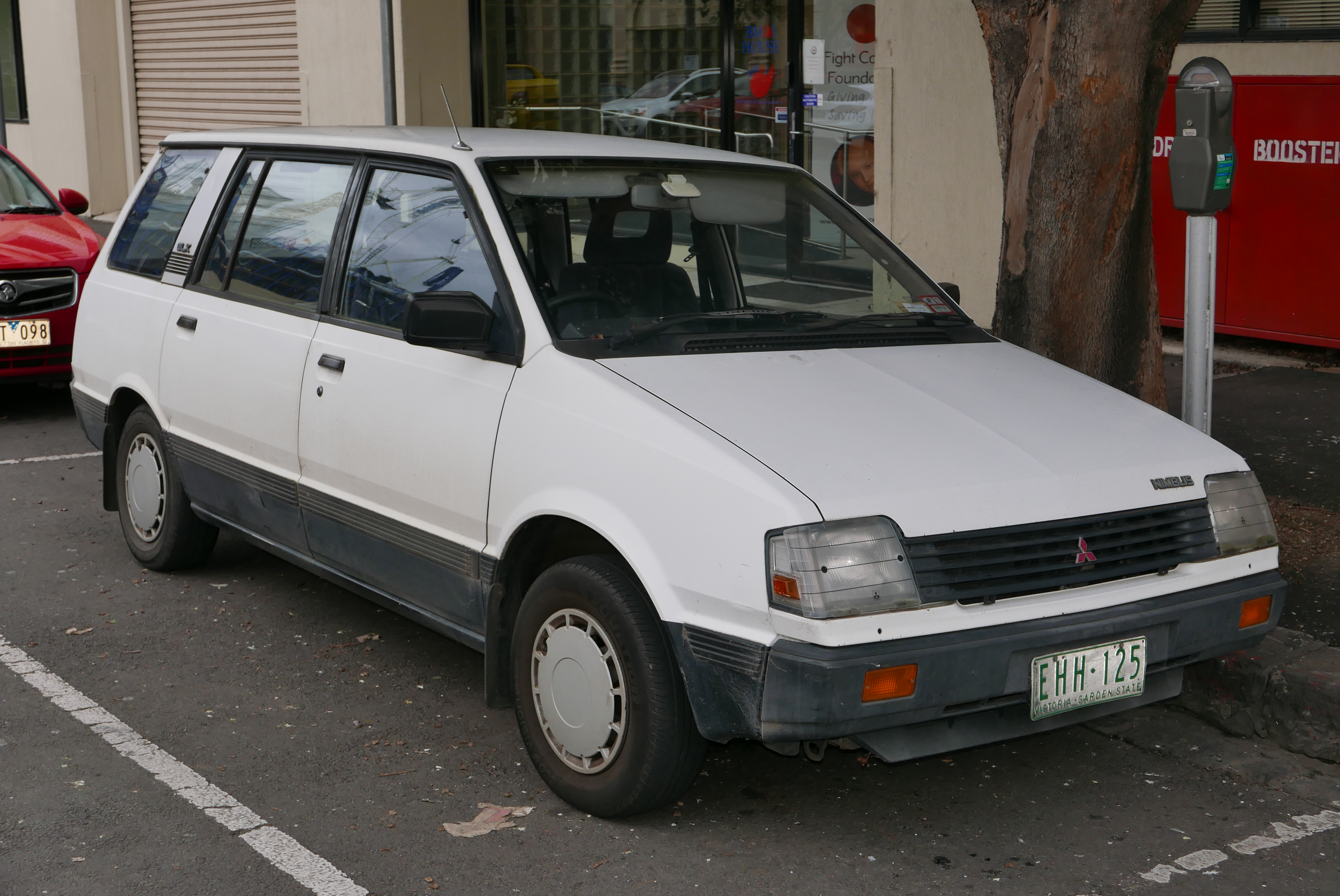

Overview
- Also called: Mitsubishi Nimbus (Australia); Mitsubishi Space Van (Finland); Mitsubishi Space Wagon; Dodge Colt Vista; Plymouth Colt Vista; Eagle Vista Wagon (Canada)
- Production: 1983–1991
- Assembly: Japan: Nagoya Plant, Okazaki, Aichi; New Zealand: Porirua

Body and chassis
- Body style: 5-door station wagon
- Layout: Front-engine, front-wheel-drive or four-wheel-drive

Powertrain
- Engine: petrol: 1,597 cc G32B I4 (D02W); 1,755 cc G37B I4 (D05W); 1,795 cc G62B I4 (D03W); 1,795 cc G62B turbo I4 (D03W); 1,997 cc G63B I4 (D04W/D08W); diesel: 1,795 cc 4D65T turbo I4 (D09W)
- Transmission: 3-speed automatic 5-speed manual 4x2-speed "Super Shift" manual

Dimensions
- Wheelbase: FWD: 2,625 mm (103.3 in); 4WD: 2,630 mm (103.5 in)
- Length: 4,295–4,485 mm (169.1–176.6 in)
- Width: 1,645 mm (64.8 in)
- Height: FWD: 1,525 mm (60.0 in); 4WD: 1,580 mm (62.2 in)
- Curb weight: 1,133kg

The first generation Chariot (D0#W-series) was produced from February 1983 until May 1991 with a choice of SOHC straight-four powerplants ranging from the 1.6-liter 4G32 to the 2.0-liter 4G63 petrol engines, or the 1.8 liter 4D65T turbo-diesel (from October 1984), mated to a 5-speed manual or 3-speed automatic transmission. Based on the Tredia, the Chariot partially replaced the Mitsubishi Galant station wagon. In Japan the Chariot was available as either a six- or a seven-seater, in which the rear two rows could be folded down flat; the middle row on the six-seater model could be turned around to create a sitting area in the rear (although not while the vehicle was in motion).

The Chariot's wheelbase was 2,625 mm (103.3 in), while overall length ranged from 4,295–4,485 mm (169.1–176.6 in) depending on market and equipment level, which was within compliance with Japanese regulations concerning exterior dimensions and engine displacement size. In most export markets, the Chariot was sold as the Mitsubishi Space Wagon, but there were also a number of other names used.

Japanese customers could also get the 4G62 engine in the MR Turbo version from July 1983 until the 1987 model year (1795 cc, 135 PS or 99 kW at 5800 rpm). This version could reach 175 km/h (109 mph), and was also available with the 3-speed automatic. From June 1984, a version with permanent four-wheel drive was also offered for the two-liter engined model, producing 110 PS (81 kW) at 5500 rpm. ME, MF, or MT specifications were available. The four-wheel drive actuator clutch was powered by negative pressure in the intake manifold, adding drive to the rear wheels via a propeller shaft with three joints, which allowed it not to encroach on the passenger compartment. The 4WD models all used the 4x2 Super Shift transmission until mid-1985, when the pricier MF and MT versions changed to a five-speed manual and on-demand four-wheel drive, relying on a viscous coupling to send power to the rear wheels when slipping was detected.

A van version with an extended fiberglass roof was sold in Finland as the Mitsubishi Space Van. At the time vans were exempt from tax in Finland and the roof was extended to reach the minimum height of cargo space needed to be registered as a van. The fiberglass extensions were produced by boat manufacturer Esboat. The van's top speed was limited to 80 km/h.

In Australia, where it was marketed as the "Nimbus", it won the 1984 Wheels Car of the Year award in its debut year. The Nimbus model codes were "UA" (1984), "UB" (1986), and "UC" (1987).

A single 1.8-litre GLX version, with manual or automatic transmission, was assembled from CKD kits in New Zealand by importer Todd Motors (later Mitsubishi NZ Ltd).

=== Colt Vista ===
The rebadged Dodge and Plymouth Colt Vista, in Canada also sold as the Eagle Vista Wagon (1989–1991), were introduced in August 1983 as a 1984 model and they were offered in North America until 1991. The Colt Vista was originally available only with front-wheel drive and the 2.0-liter G63B engine producing 88 hp (66 kW) in US trim. Transmissions were the "Twin-Stick" (4x2 gears), a 5-speed manual, or a 3-speed automatic. Four-wheel drive became an option in the United States in the spring of 1985, while in Canada, the Colt Vista was only marketed with four-wheel drive in several model years including 1986.

In later years, power crept up to 98 hp (73 kW). Top speed was 155 km/h (96 mph), 150 km/h (93 mph) for the 4WD. The Dodge/Plymouth Colt/Eagle Summit wagons replaced the Vista.

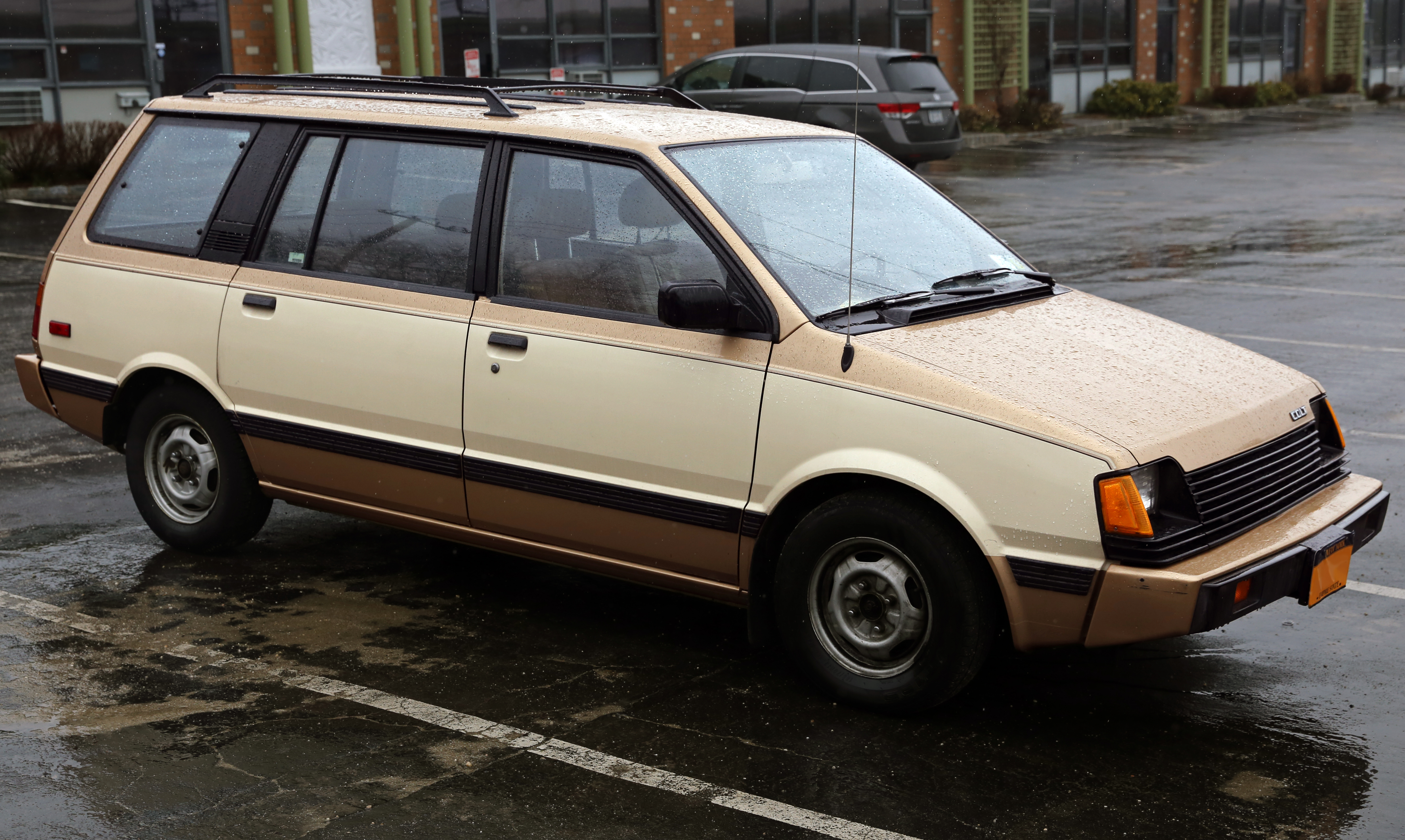
1986 Dodge Colt Vista (US)

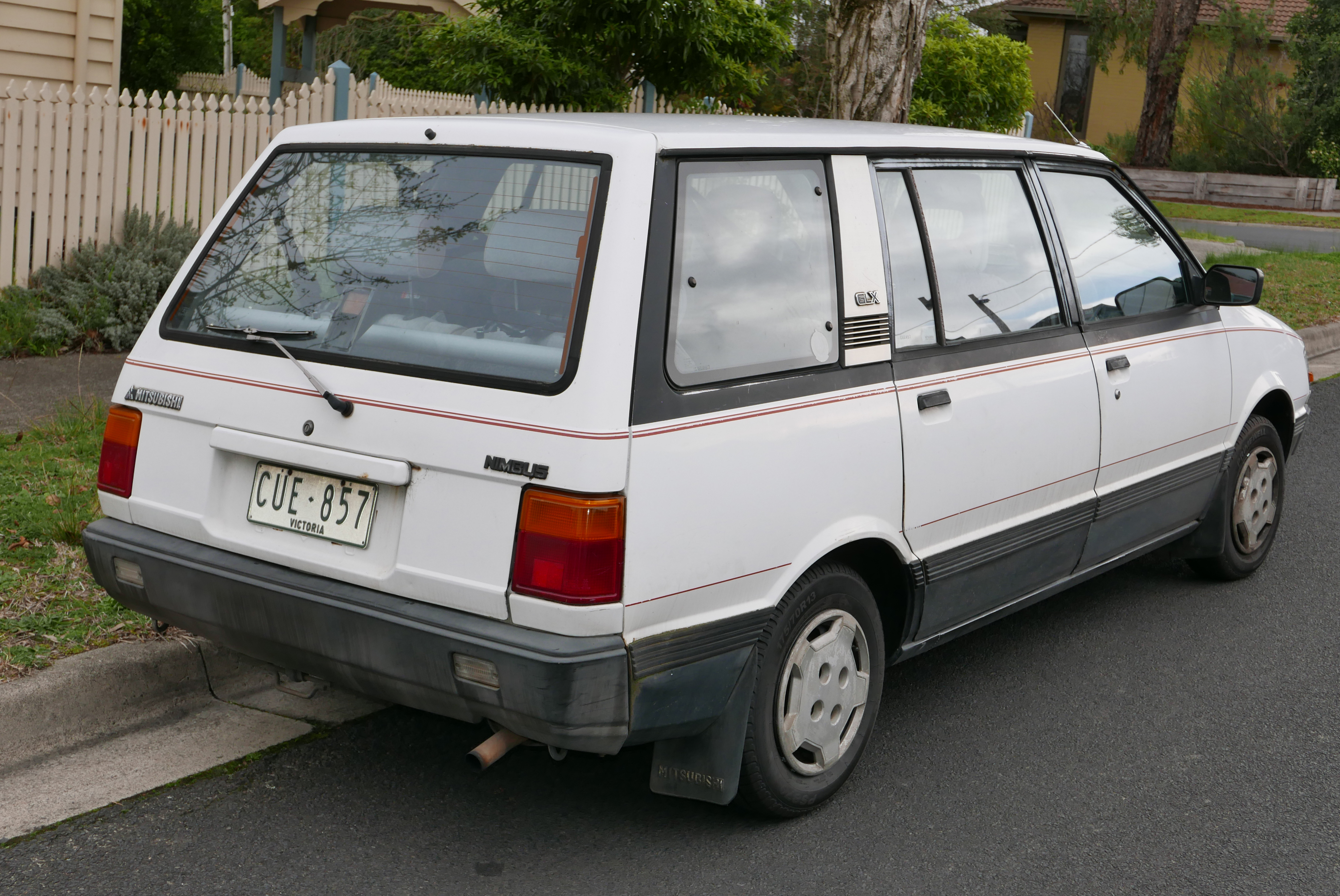
Mitsubishi Nimbus GLX (Australia)

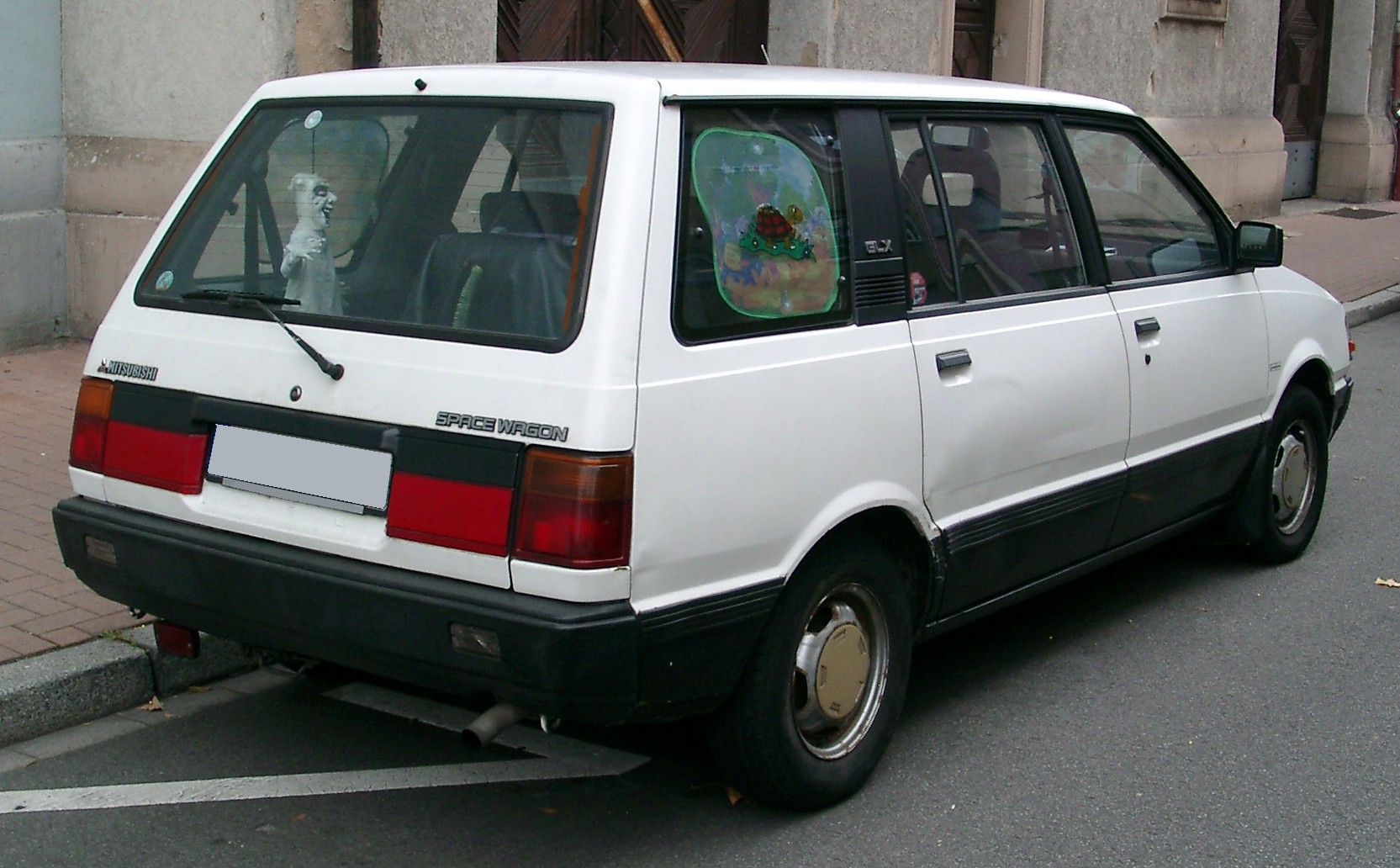
Mitsubishi Space Wagon GLX (Germany)

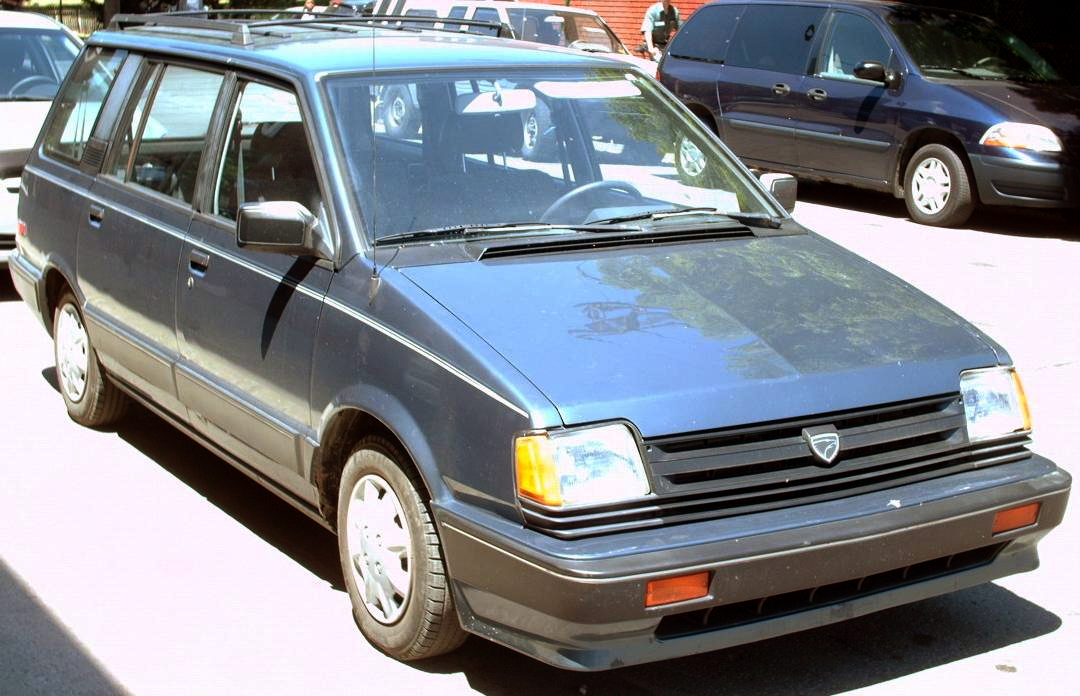
Eagle Vista Wagon (Canada)

== Second generation (1991) ==
Second generation (N30W/N40W)
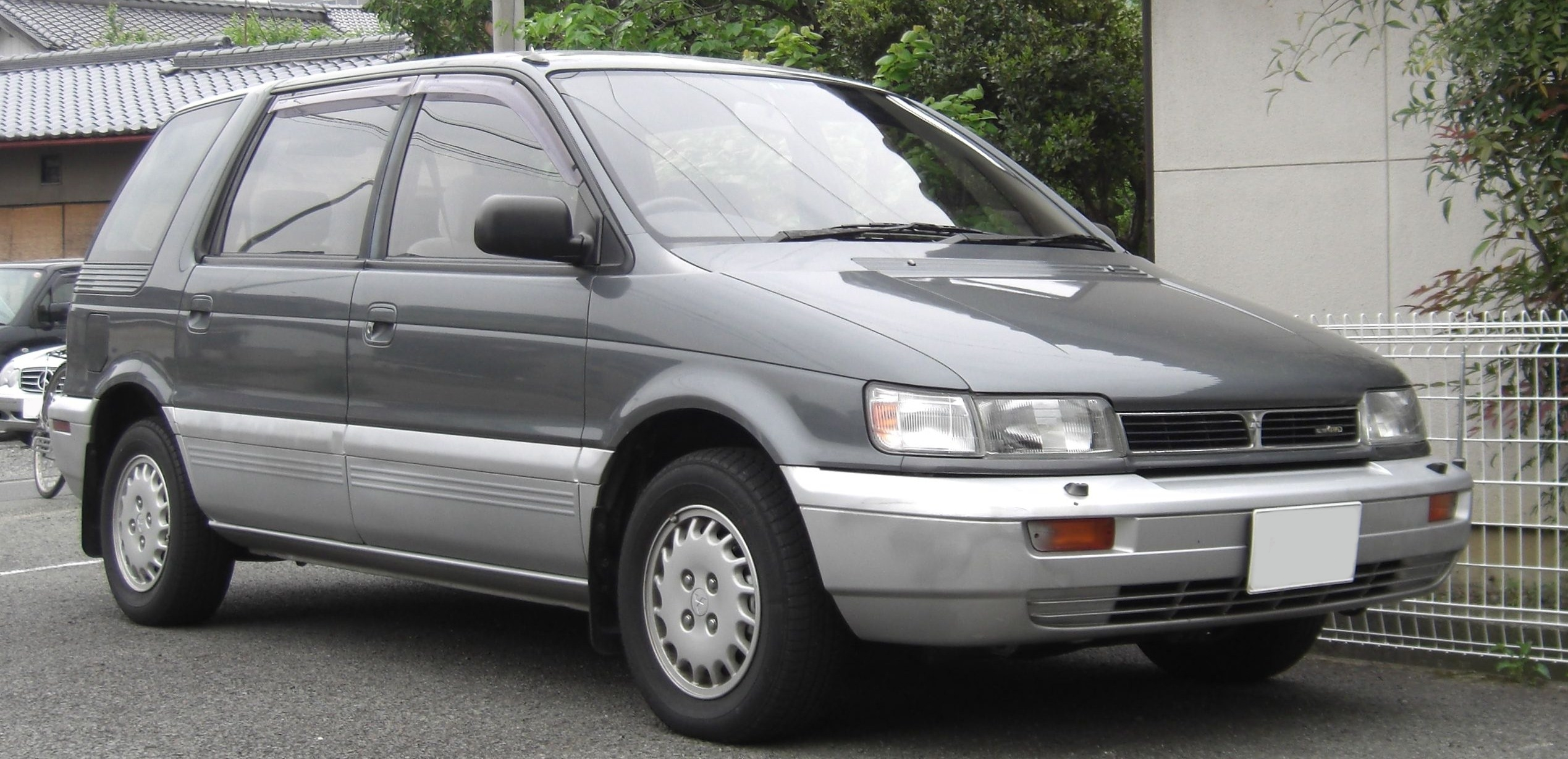

Overview
- Also called: Hyundai Santamo; Kia Joice/Carstar; Galloper Santamo; Mitsubishi Expo; Mitsubishi Nimbus; Mitsubishi Space Wagon; Eagle Summit Wagon; Plymouth Colt Visa; Guangtong GTQ5020XZH (China; JV); Sanxing SXZ6450 (China; JV)
- Production: 1991–1997 (Japan); 1996–2002 (South Korea)
- Assembly: Japan: Nagoya Plant, Okazaki, Aichi; New Zealand: Porirua; China: Zhuhai, Guangdong (JV); China: Zhanjiang, Guangdong (CKD); South Korea: Ulsan (Hyundai Precision Industry, Co. Ltd. and Hyundai Motor Company); Philippines: Cainta, Rizal (1992–1999)

Body and chassis
- Body style: 5-door station wagon
- Layout: Front-engine, front-wheel-drive or four-wheel-drive
- Related: Mitsubishi RVR

Powertrain
- Engine: petrol: 1,834 cc 4G93 I4 (N31W/N41W); 1,997 cc 4G63 I4 (N33W/N43W); 1,997 cc 4G63T turbo I4 (N43W); 2,351 cc 4G64 I4 (N34W/N44W); diesel: 1,795 cc 4D65T turbo I4 (N35W); 1,997 cc 4D68T turbo I4 (N38W/N48W)
- Transmission: 5-speed manual 4-speed automatic

Dimensions
- Wheelbase: 1991-94: 2,720 mm (107.1 in); 1994-97: 2,720 mm (107.1 in)
- Length: 1991-94: 4,515 mm (177.8 in); 1994-97: 4,555 mm (179.3 in)
- Width: 1,695 mm (66.7 in)
- Height: 1991-94: 1,580 mm (62.2 in); 1994-97: 1,670 mm (65.7 in)

The second-generation Chariot grew in wheelbase, length, width and height while remaining within the bounds of the Japanese "compact car" classification pertaining to vehicle exterior dimensions and engine displacement. The G63B engine was replaced with the architecturally similar but updated 4G63 four-cylinder engine. In the home market, the turbo-diesel 4D65T was phased out and replaced with a newer and larger 1,997 cc 4D68T powerplant, but in export markets the 1.8-liter engine continued to be offered. The 1.8-liter four-cylinder 4G93 engine was also not offered on the Chariot in Japan. In 1993, the 2,350 cc 4G64 was added to the range. A five-speed manual, or four-speed automatic could be specified, and in high-end models an INVECS electronically controlled four-speed auto with "fuzzy logic" was also available.

A limited-production 4WD and turbocharged version was offered only in Japan, called the "Resort Runner GT", which used a powertrain similar to that seen in the Lancer Evolution and the Galant VR-4. However, its mechanical specification (including turbocharger and transmission) was closer to that of the first two generations of Eclipse GSX. The 4G63 engine was slightly detuned to produce 230 PS (169 kW; 227 bhp) in manual transmission models, and 220 PS (162 kW; 217 bhp) in automatic transmission models. With an alleged top speed of 139 mph, it was supposedly the fastest three-row passenger vehicle in the world when it was new.

The Resort Runner GT was a spiritual continuation of the turbocharged first-generation Chariot 1.8MR produced from 1983 through 1987. According to Mitsubishi Motors recall data, approximately 2,260 Chariot Resort Runner GT and GT-V models were produced from April 25, 1995 to October 18, 1995, with an additional batch of 155 cars built from April 25, 1996 to August 27, 1997.

The Chariot Resort Runner GT seated seven passengers in a three-row seating arrangement. Second- and third-row seats reclined fully to create a small bed, or folded flat to create a flat load space. A five-passenger two-row version called the Chariot Resort Runner GT-V replaced the third-row bench seat with a cargo tray to create a flat loading surface. Some sources also indicate it sacrificed power brakes and power mirrors to reduce weight.

Most other Chariot variants, including the American-market Mitsubishi Expo, featured fully reclining first-, second- and third-row seats that created a larger makeshift bed.

In September 1994, the Chariot received a minor facelift. At the same time, the 2.0-liter turbodiesel gained an intercooler and power increased from 88 to 94 PS (65 to 69 kW) as a result.

From 1992, a single GLX model was assembled in New Zealand, with manual or automatic transmissions, at Mitsubishi's Porirua plant. Whilst the vehicle was sold in many countries under a variety of names, not all markets received the full range of models. For example, Australia received only front-wheel-drive models powered by the 2.4-liter 4G64 engine. It was called the Mitsubishi Nimbus (UF) in Australia.

It was sold in the Philippines as the "Space Wagon MPV" in 1992. Earlier models are powered by Mitsubishi's 4G93 1.8-liter, carbureted inline-four engine paired to a standard 5-speed manual transmission. The facelifted models have been updated to the fuel-injected version of that engine, and a 4-speed automatic transmission became optional. They also had revised front ends with new headlights and grille, as well as a new wheel design, third brake light and two-tone color combinations. By 1999, Mitsubishi dropped the Space Wagon from the lineup in the Philippines without a direct replacement.

=== Santamo ===
In Korea, Hyundai Precision Industry Co., Ltd. built a rebadged version of the second generation Mitsubishi Chariot at its Ulsan Yeompo-dong Plant between 1996 and 2002 and called it the Hyundai Santamo and Galloper Santamo. According to the corresponding article on Korean Wikipedia, the Hyundai Santamo name was an acronym, meaning "SAfety aNd TAlented MOtor".

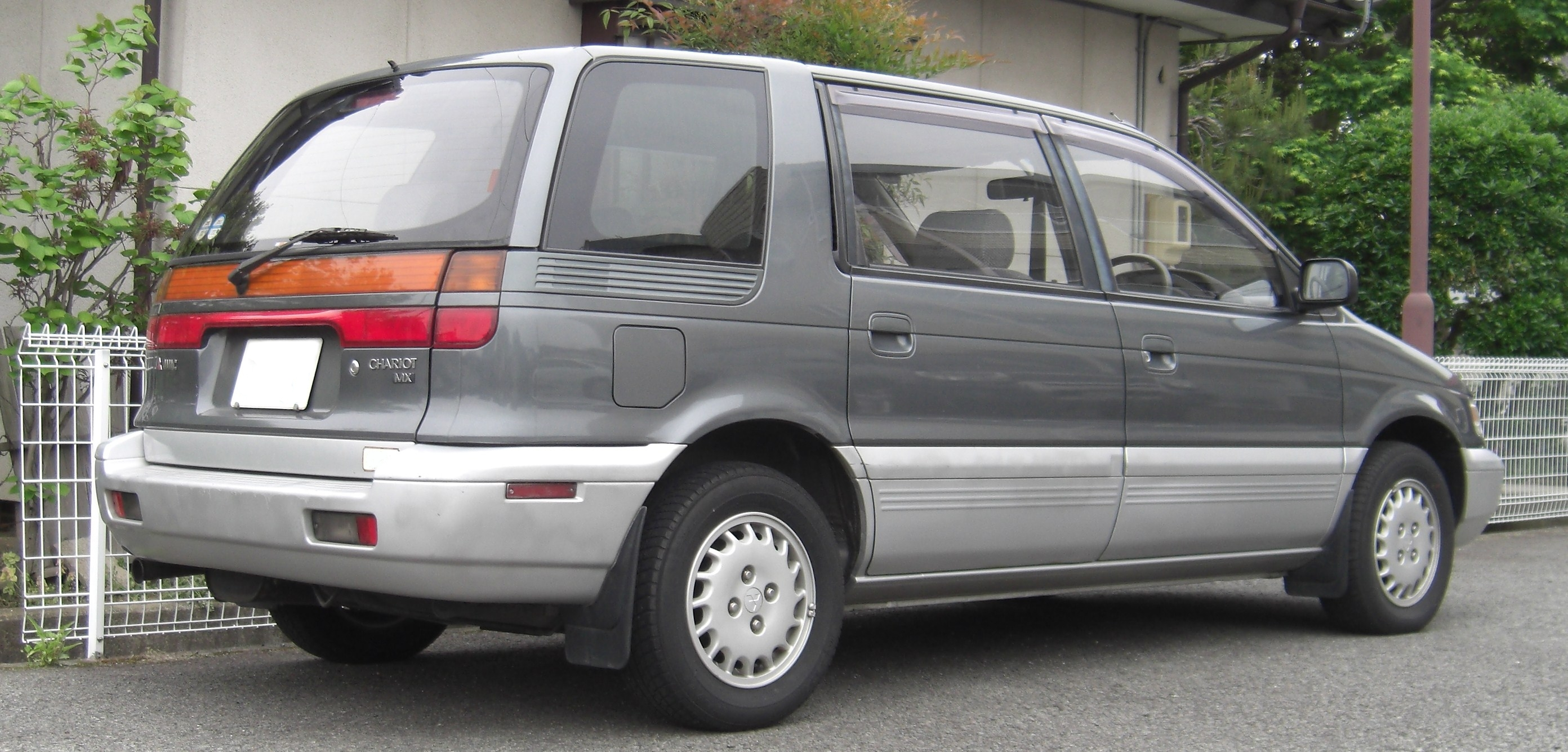
Mitsubishi Chariot rear

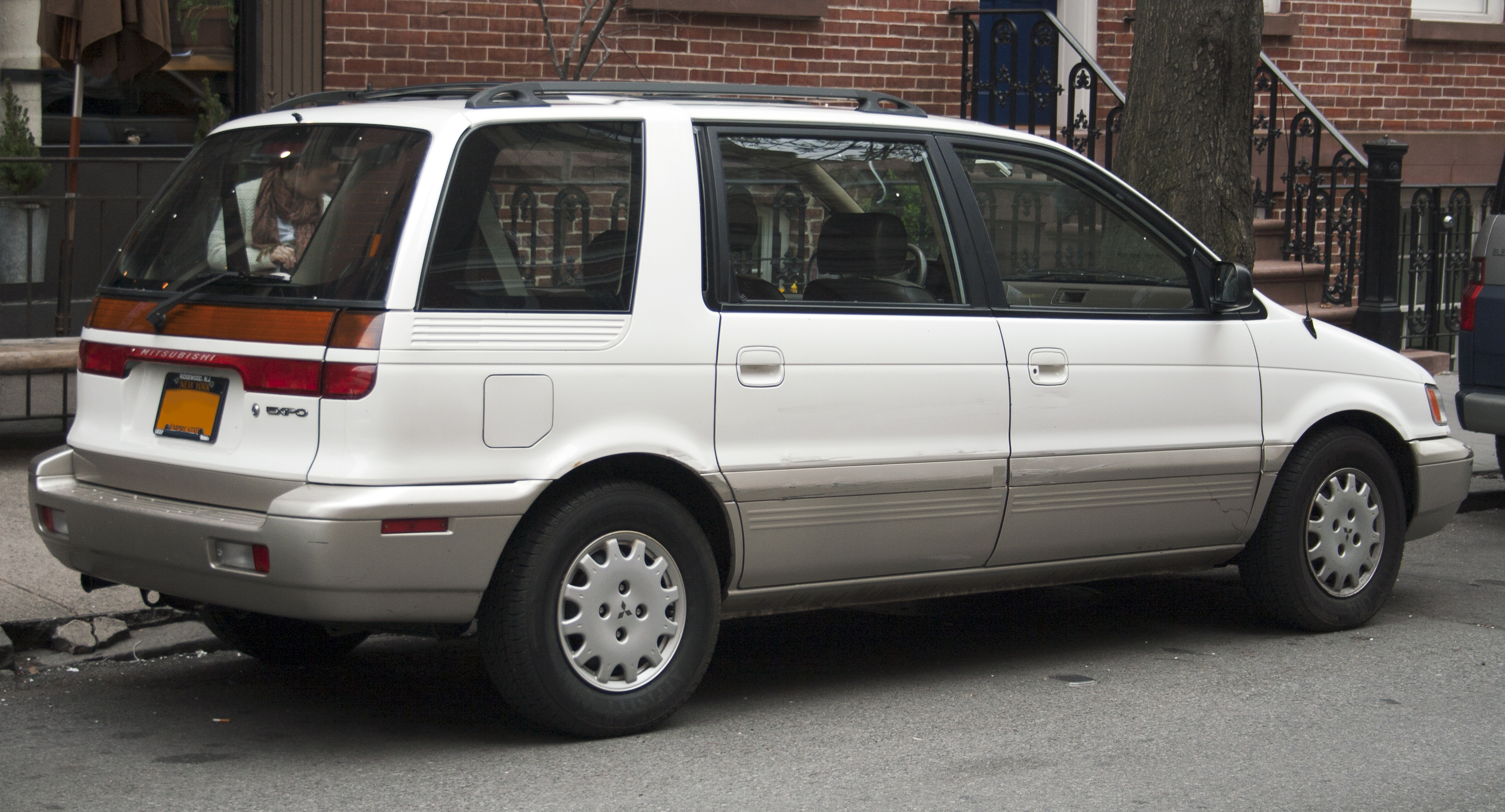
Mitsubishi Expo (US) rear

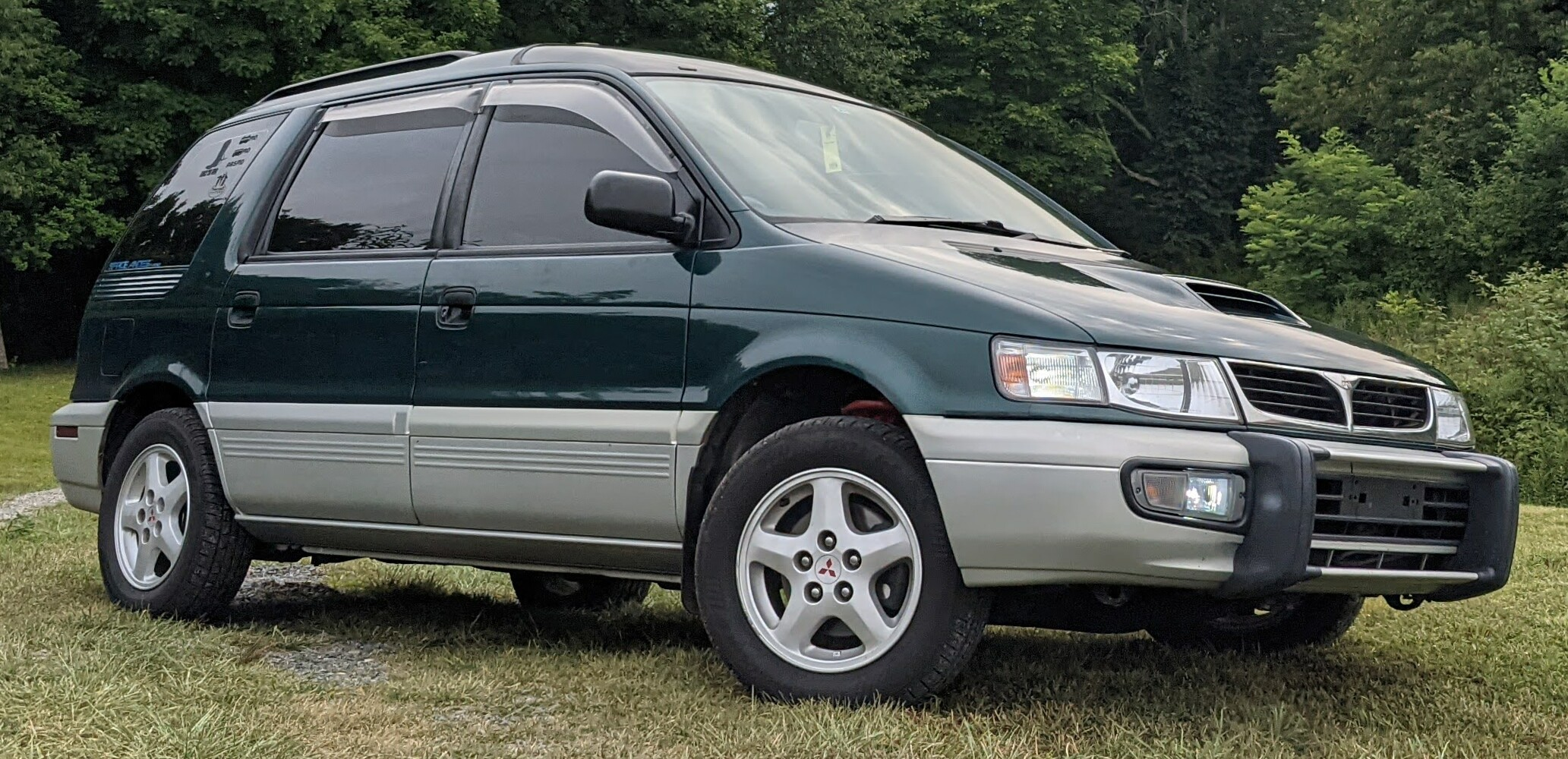
Japanese-market 1995 Mitsubishi Chariot Resort Runner GT

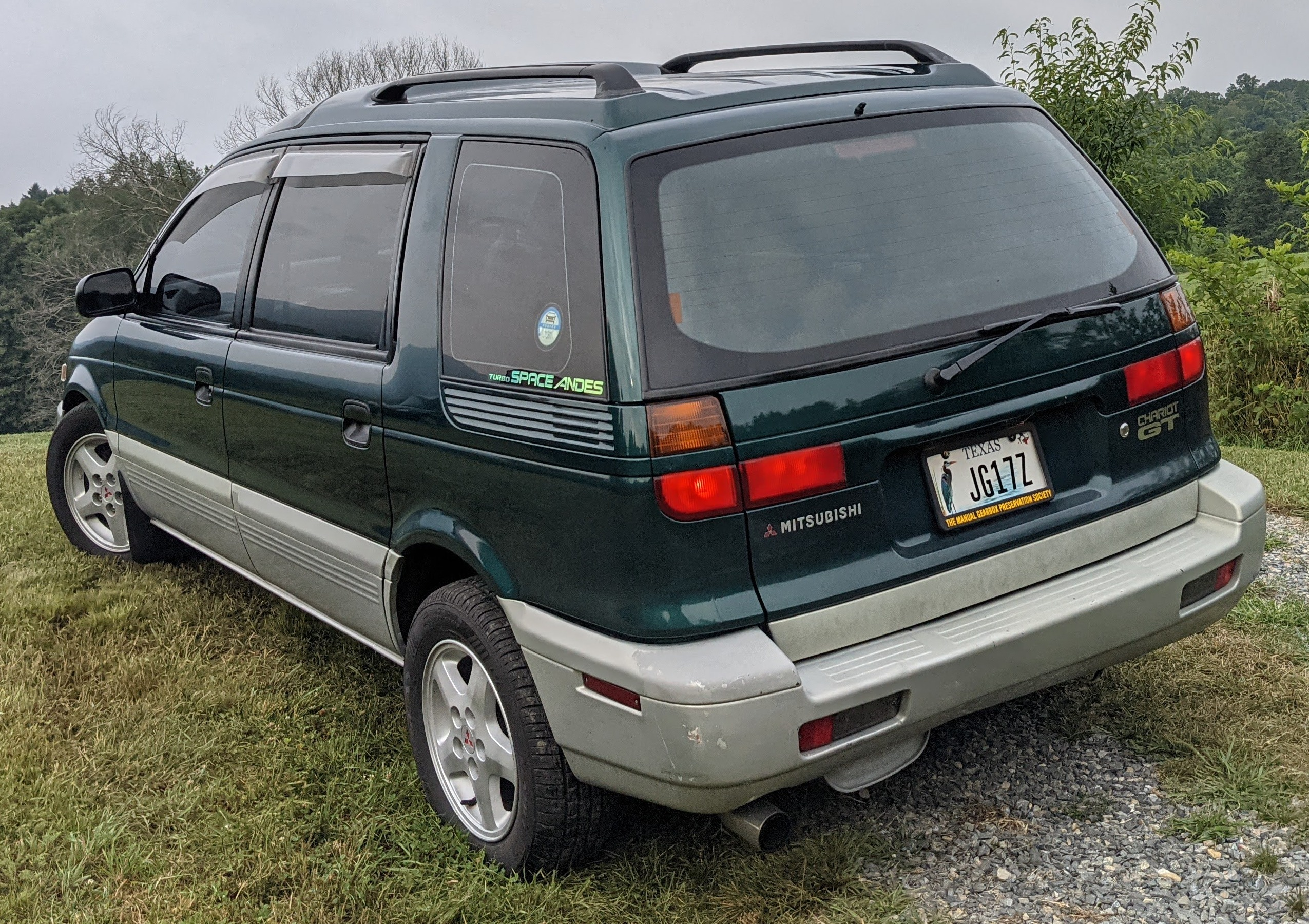
Japanese-market 1995 Mitsubishi Chariot Resort Runner GT

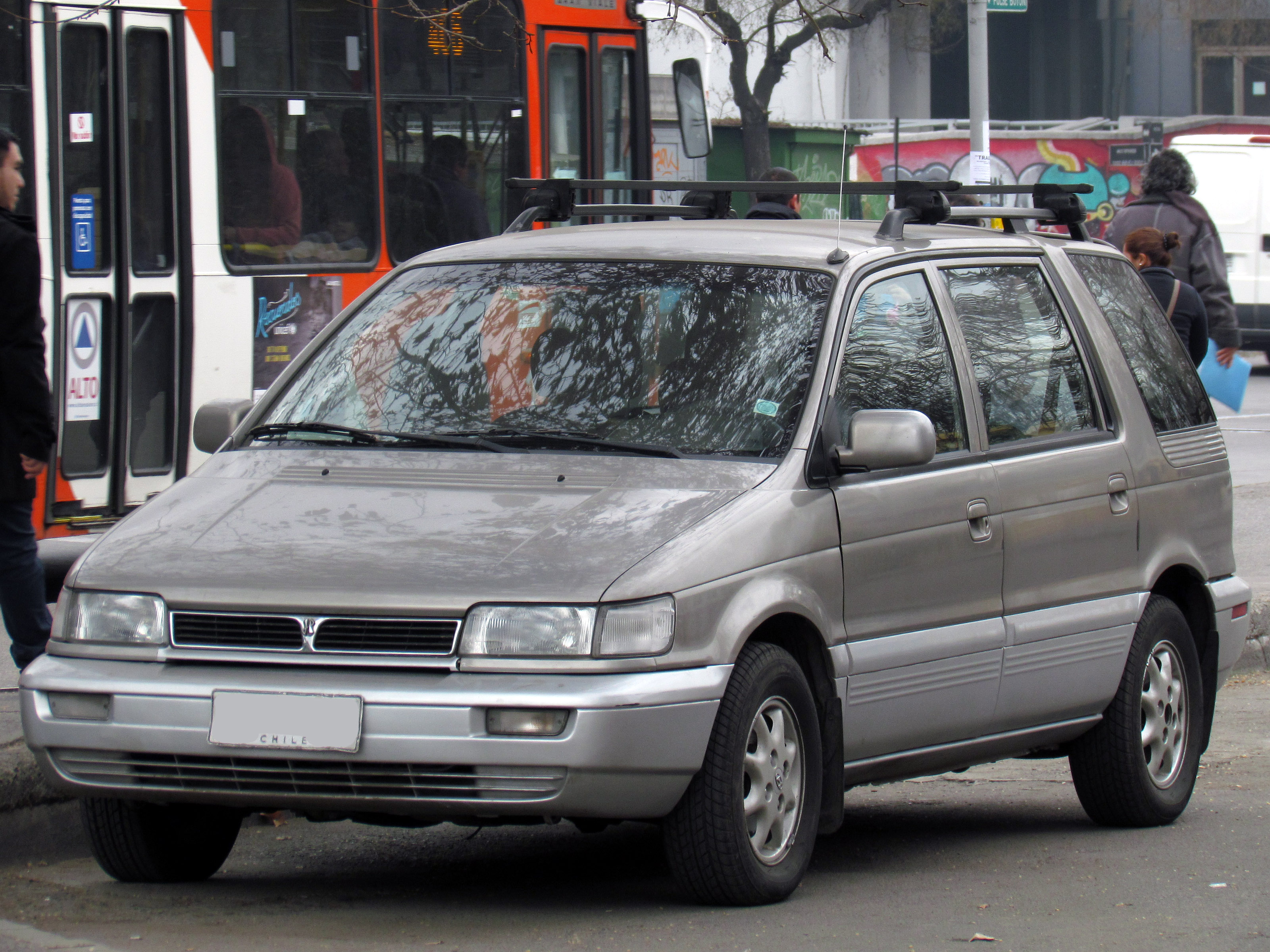
Hyundai Santamo

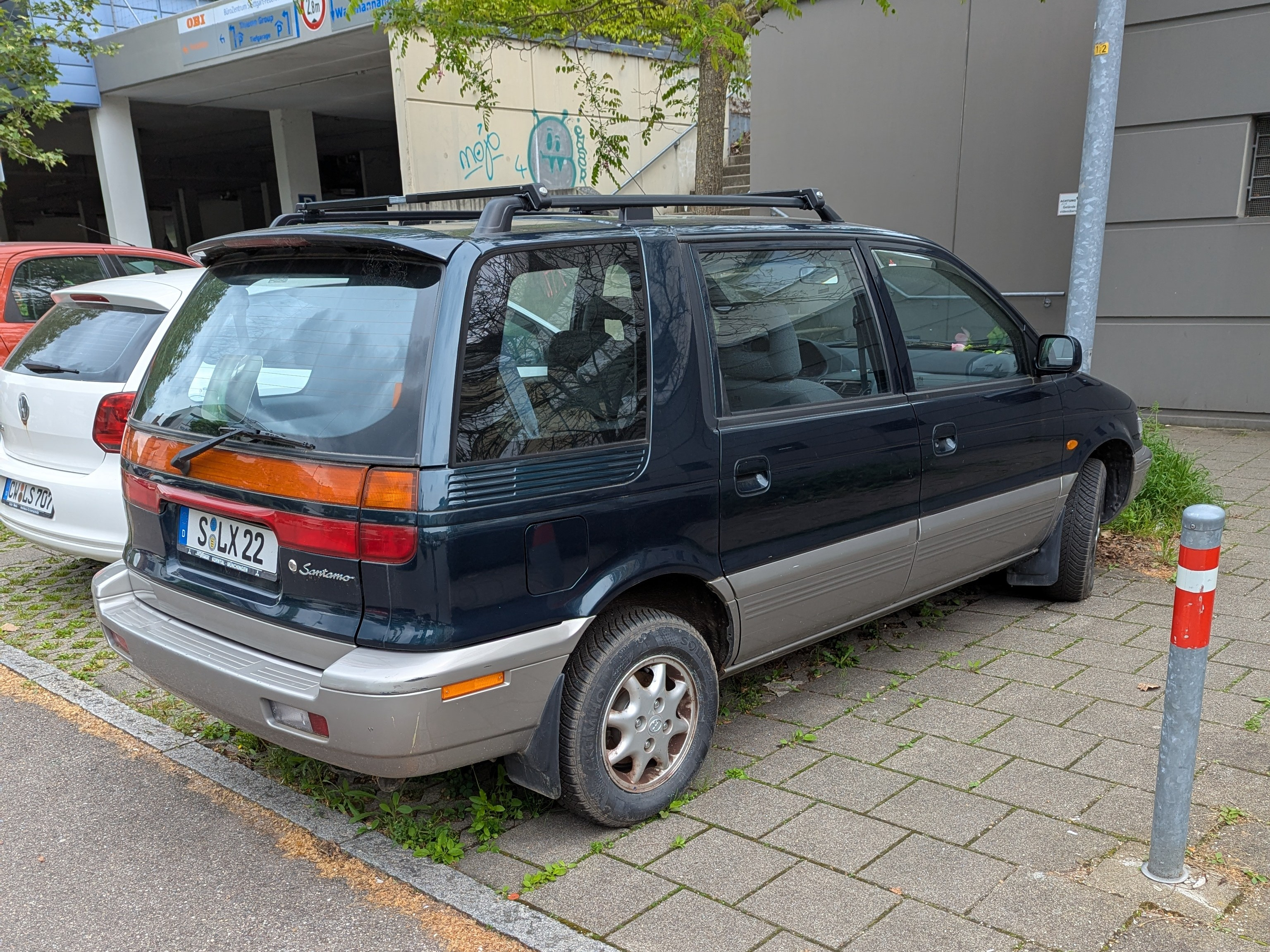
Hyundai Santamo in Stuttgart, Germany

== Third generation (1997) ==
Third generation (UG)
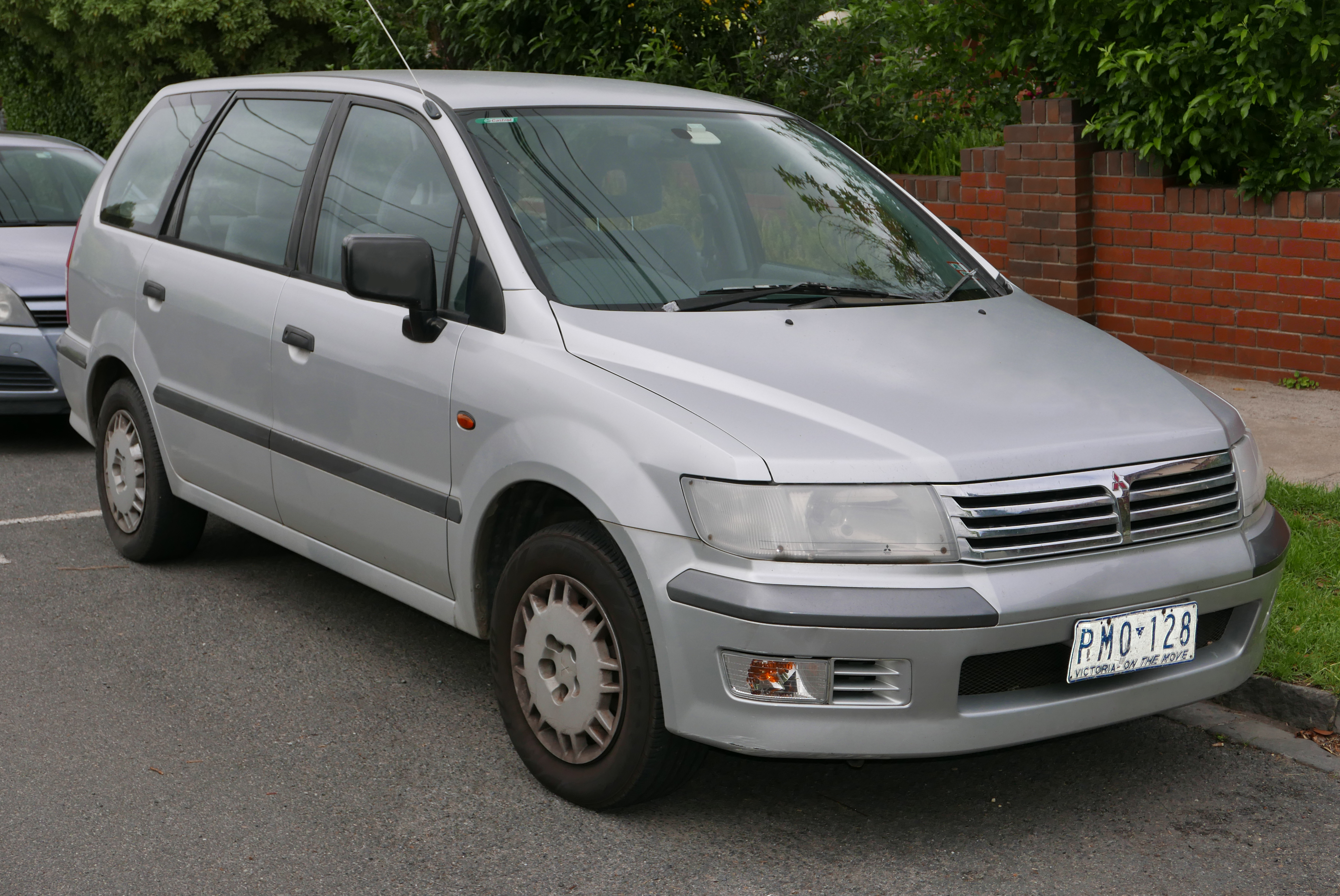
- Mitsubishi Nimbus GLX

Overview
- Also called: Mitsubishi Nimbus; Mitsubishi Space Wagon; Mitsubishi Savrin; Soueast Sovereign (China)
- Production: 1997–2003; 2004–2006 (China)
- Model years: 1998–2003; 2004–2006 (China)
- Assembly: Japan: Nagoya Plant, Okazaki, Aichi; China: Fuzhou

Body and chassis
- Body style: 5-door station wagon
- Layout: Front-engine, front-wheel-drive Front-engine, four-wheel-drive
- Related: Mitsubishi RVR; Mitsubishi Savrin

Powertrain
- Engine: 2.0 L 4G63 I4; 2.4 L 4G64 I4; 2.4 L 4G69 I4 (China); 3.0 L 6G72 V6
- Transmission: 5-speed manual 4-speed automatic

Dimensions
- Wheelbase: 2,780 mm (109.4 in)
- Length: 4,650 mm (183.1 in)
- Width: 1998-2000: 1,775 mm (69.9 in); 2001-03: 1,780 mm (70.1 in)
- Height: 1,650 mm (65.0 in)

The third and final generation was introduced on October 17, 1997, and was larger and heavier again. It was now known in its home market as the Chariot Grandis, after the French grandiose, to emphasise the increase in the car's size and quality as it moved from a ladder frame to monocoque construction, using the company's RISE safety body. Mitsubishi discontinued all other straight-4 engines in favour of a single gasoline direct injection version of the 4G64, while introducing a new 2972 cc DOHC 6G72 V6 powerplant, also GDI-equipped. For Europe, there were also available 2.0 4G63 SOHC 16 valve engine, which is well known on the 8th generation Galant. The INVECS-II four-speed semi-auto and 5-speed manual transmission were options. Four-wheel-drive version was only available with 2.4 GDI and 5-speed manual transmission. Rear viscous-limited-slip differential was an option. Center differential is also with viscous-coupling-unit. Gearbox and transfer box look similar to Lancer Evolution, but still are different. For Japanese market, due to the engine size exceeding 2000cc, and the width exceeding 1.7 m, this generation was no longer in compliance with Japanese regulations, and buyers were now liable for additional yearly taxes, which affected sales. The 3.0 litre engine also obligated Japanese buyers to pay more annual road tax which was also a consideration affecting purchases.

This generation was not sold in North America, as the Dodge Caravan and Plymouth Voyager were now sold in regular and extended length vehicles, with the longer models sold as Grand Caravan and Grand Voyager in addition to the Chrysler Town and Country. It was marketed as a large minivan as a result.

The Chariot Grandis was finally superseded by release of the Mitsubishi Grandis on May 14, 2003, although production of the older vehicle continued until the following year for overseas markets.

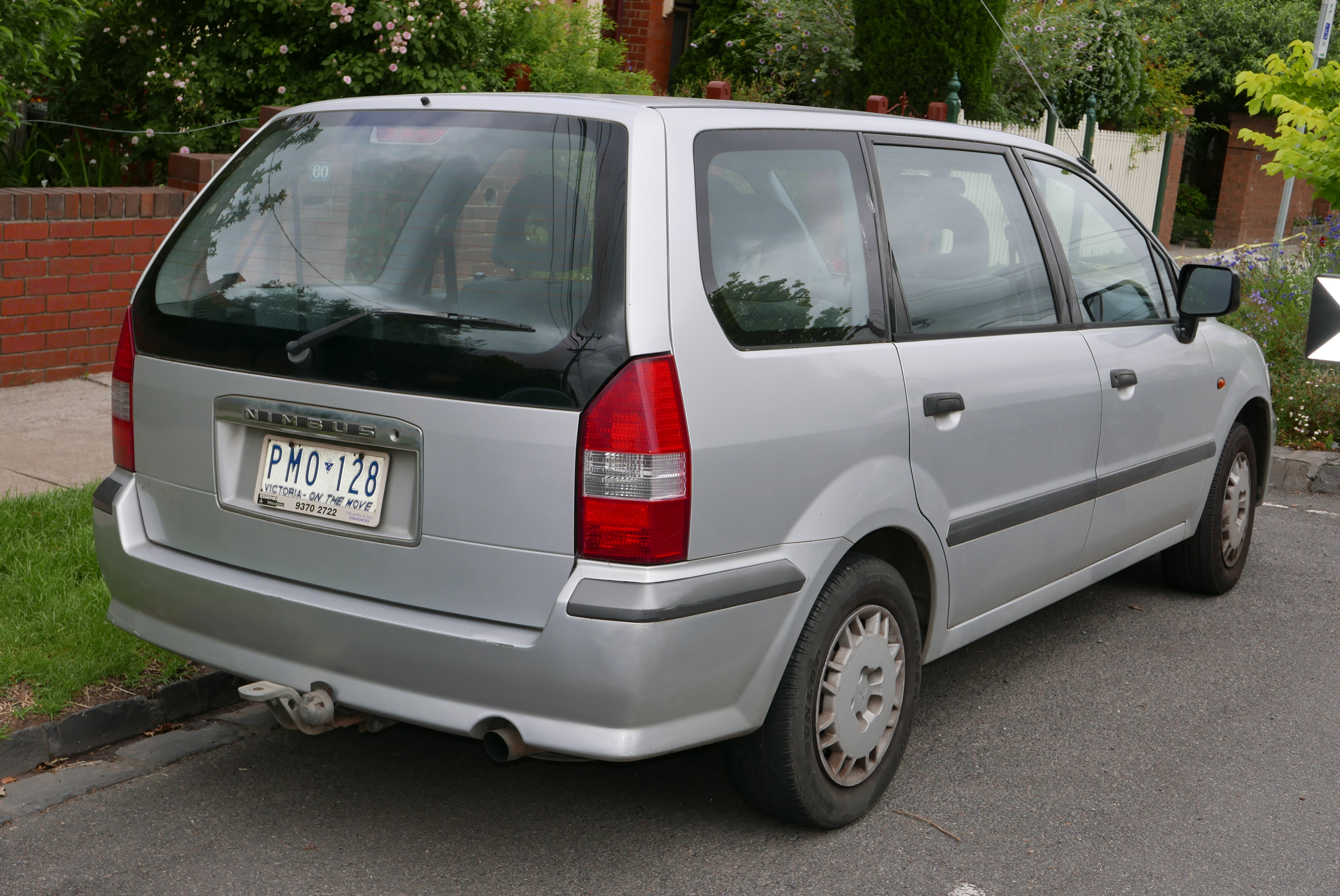
Mitsubishi Nimbus GLX (Australia)

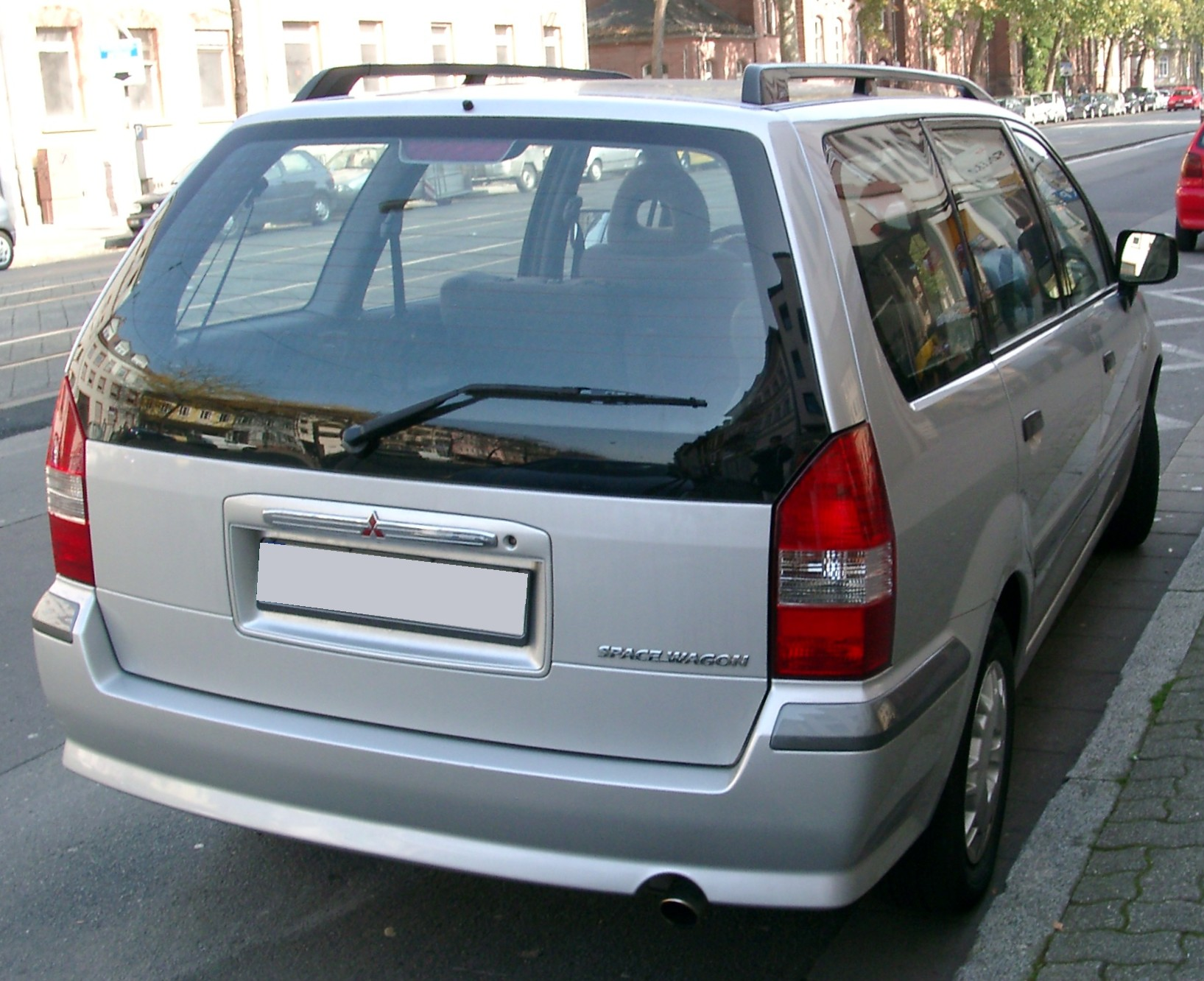
Mitsubishi Space Wagon (Europe)

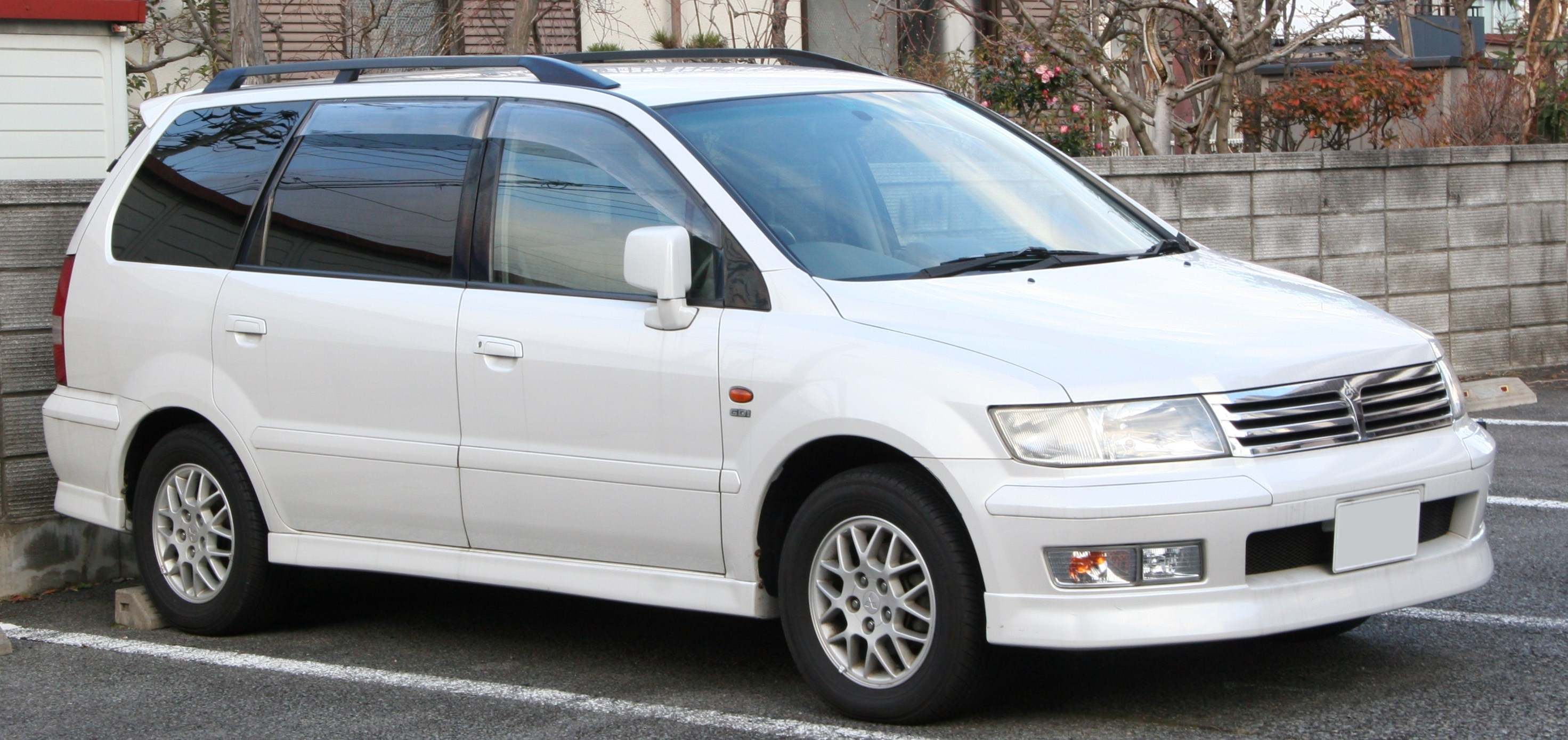
Mitsubishi Chariot Grandis

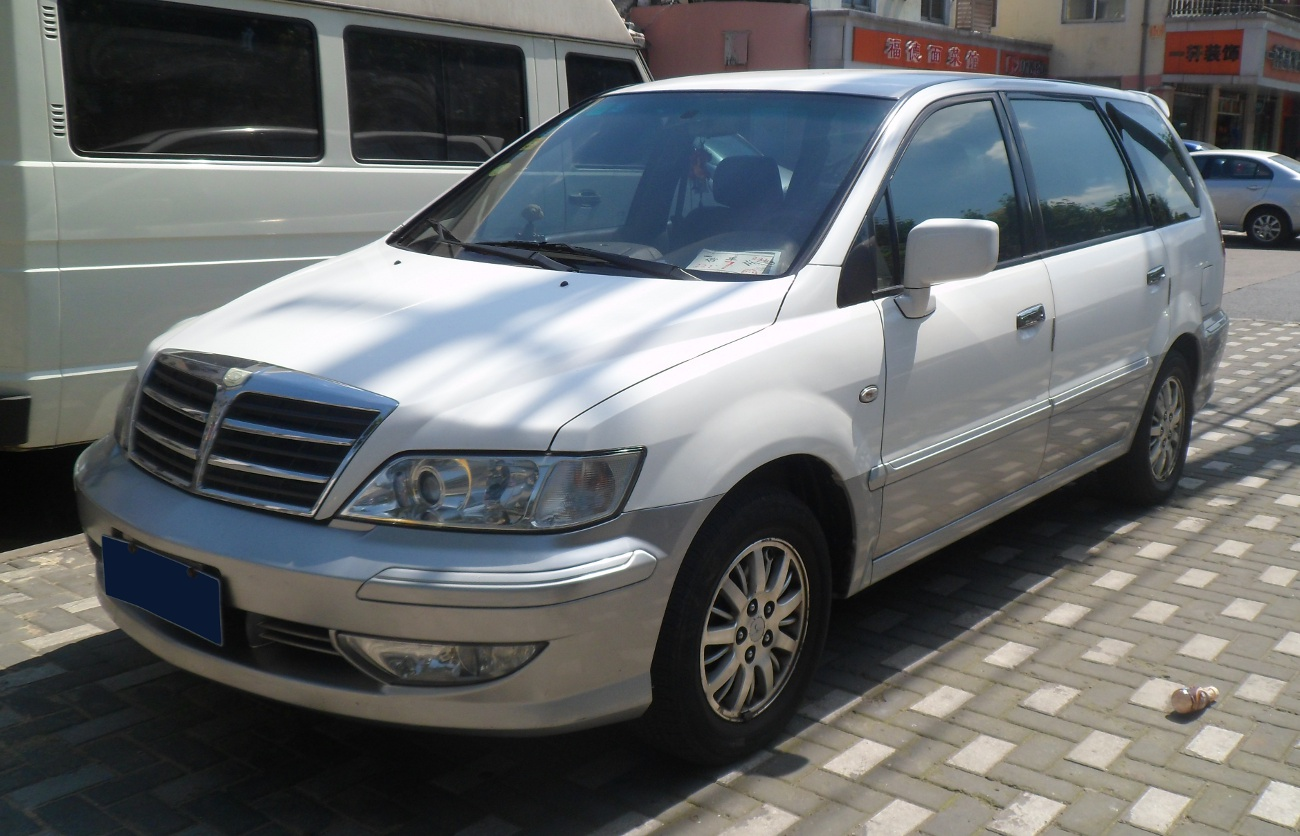
Soueast Sovereign (China)

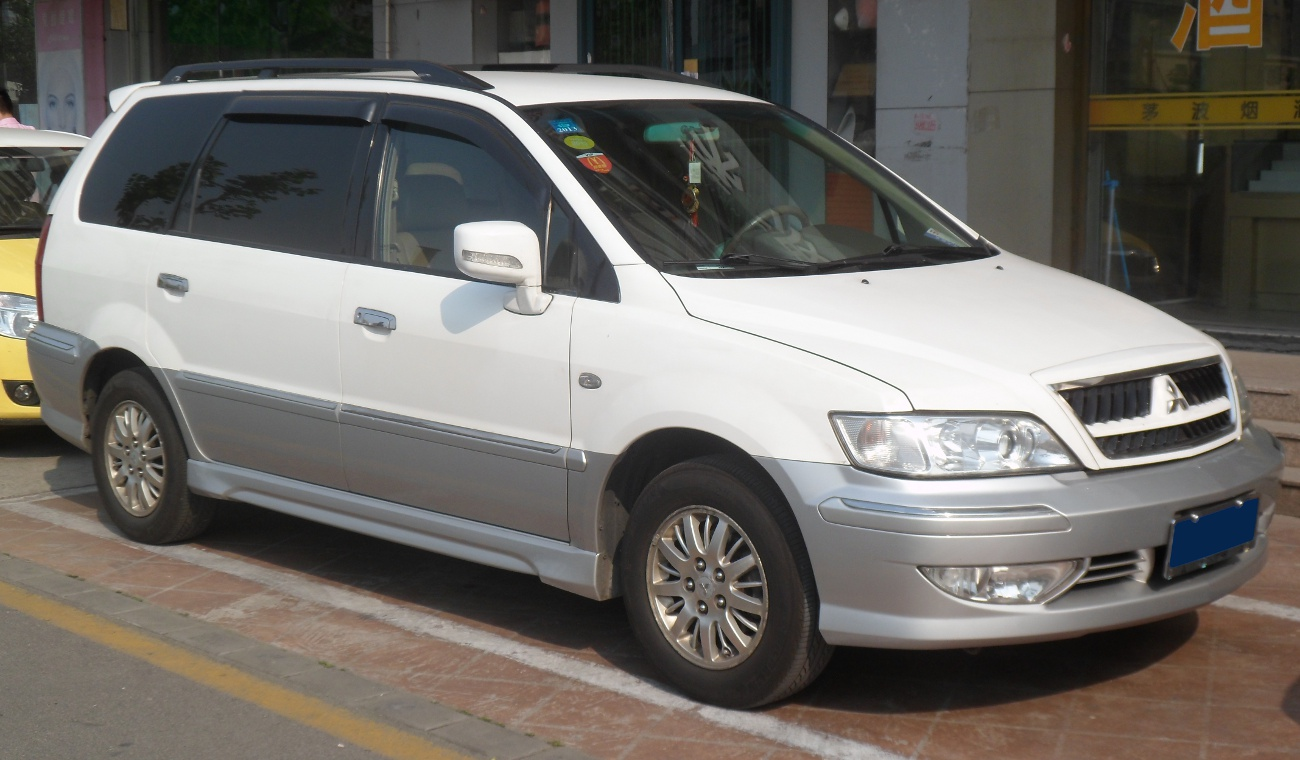
Mitsubishi Space Wagon UG facelift (China)

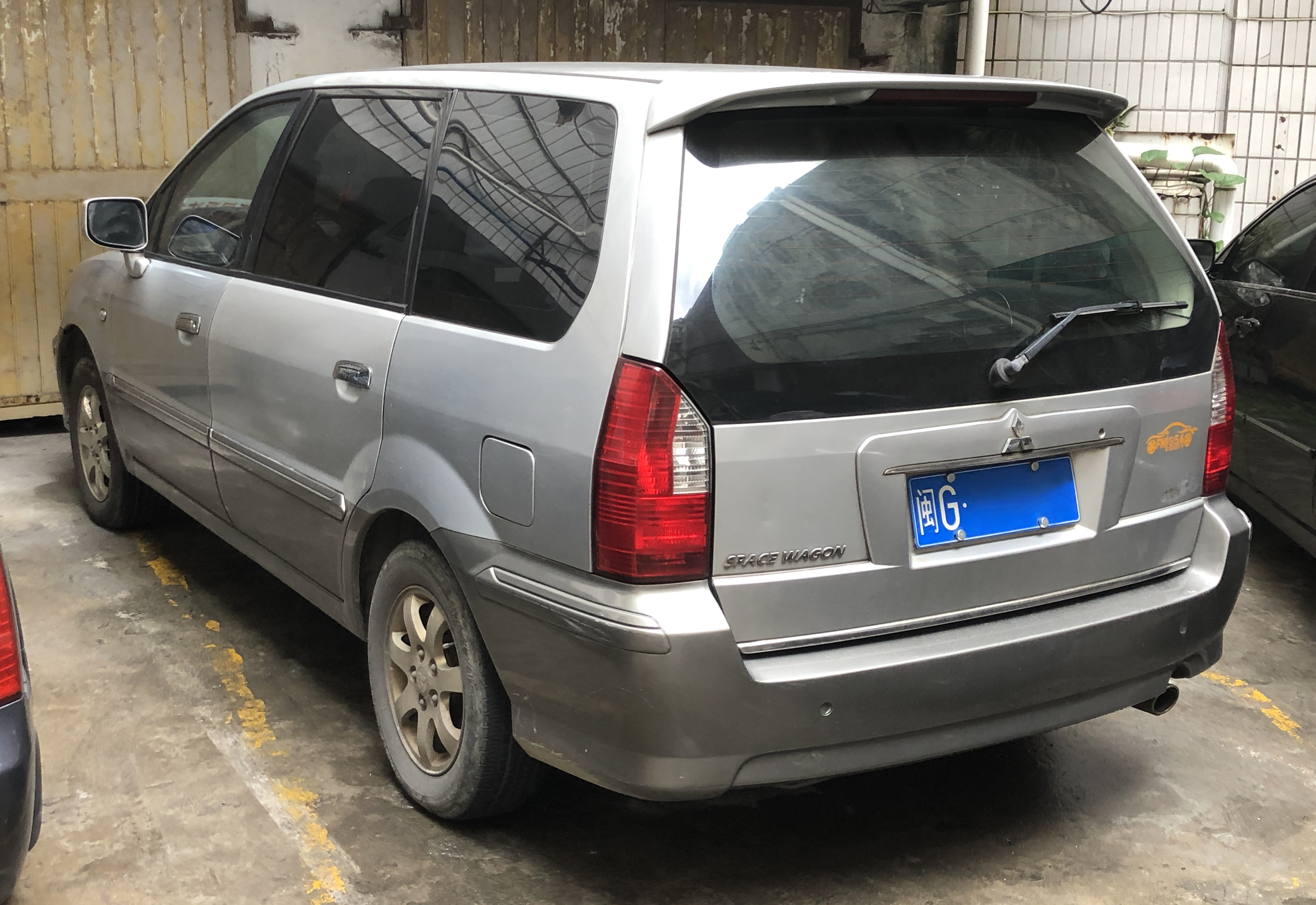
Mitsubishi Space Wagon UG facelift (China)

== Production and sales figures ==
Year	Production	Sales	
Year	Production	Domestic	Export
1995	41,943	figures unavailable	
1996	33,648	figures unavailable	
1997	59,448	figures unavailable	
1998	88,251	figures unavailable	
1999	63,010	figures unavailable	
2000	26,734	22,821	10,092
2001	15,907	10,472	7,018
2002	10,595	3,724	7,310
2003	4,043	49	4,536
2004	138	-	208

(Sources: Fact & Figures 2000, Fact & Figures 2005, Mitsubishi Motors website)
