= Kia Joice =

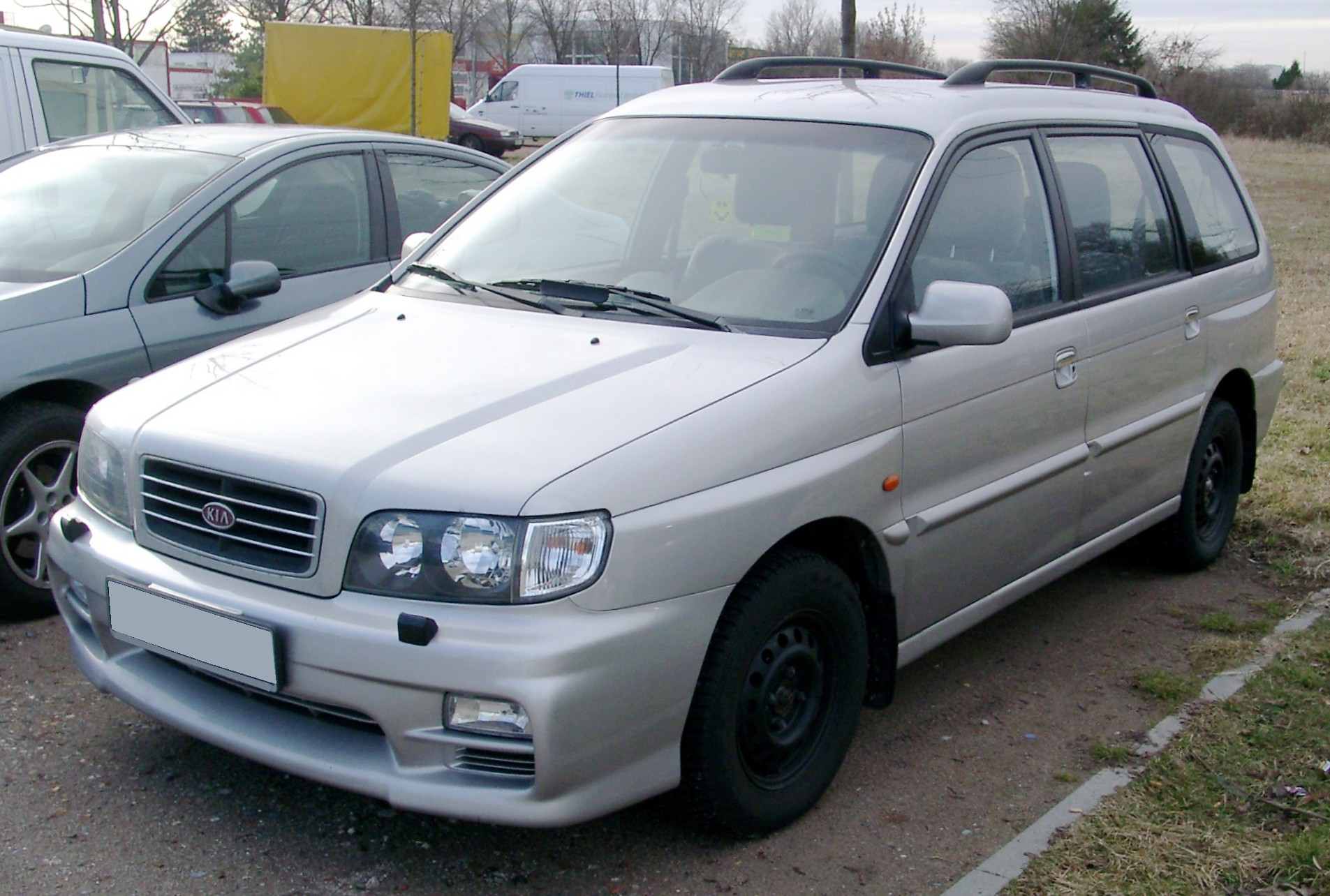

Overview
- Manufacturer: Kia Motors
- Also called: Kia Carstar
- Production: 1999–2002
- Assembly: South Korea: Ulsan (Hyundai Ulsan Plant)

Body and chassis
- Class: Compact MPV (M)
- Body style: 5-door station wagon
- Layout: Front-engine, front-wheel-drive
- Related: Hyundai Santamo

Powertrain
- Engine: 2.0L 16V I4
- Transmission: 5-speed manual 4-speed automatic

Dimensions
- Wheelbase: 2,720 mm (107 in)
- Length: 4,570 mm (180 in)
- Width: 1,735 mm (68.3 in)
- Height: 1,645 mm (64.8 in)
- Curb weight: 1,325 kg (2,921 lb)

Chronology
- Successor: Kia Carens

The Kia Joice, or Kia Carstar, is a 7-seat compact MPV produced between 1999 and 2002 by the Korean manufacturer Kia Motors.

== Overview ==
Kia co-developed the vehicle with the Hyundai Motor Company. The Joice shared the same platform as the Hyundai Santamo. The vehicle had a 2.0-liter gasoline engine that produced between 120 and 139 horse power. In 2001, a facelift was introduced for the European market.

== Gallery ==
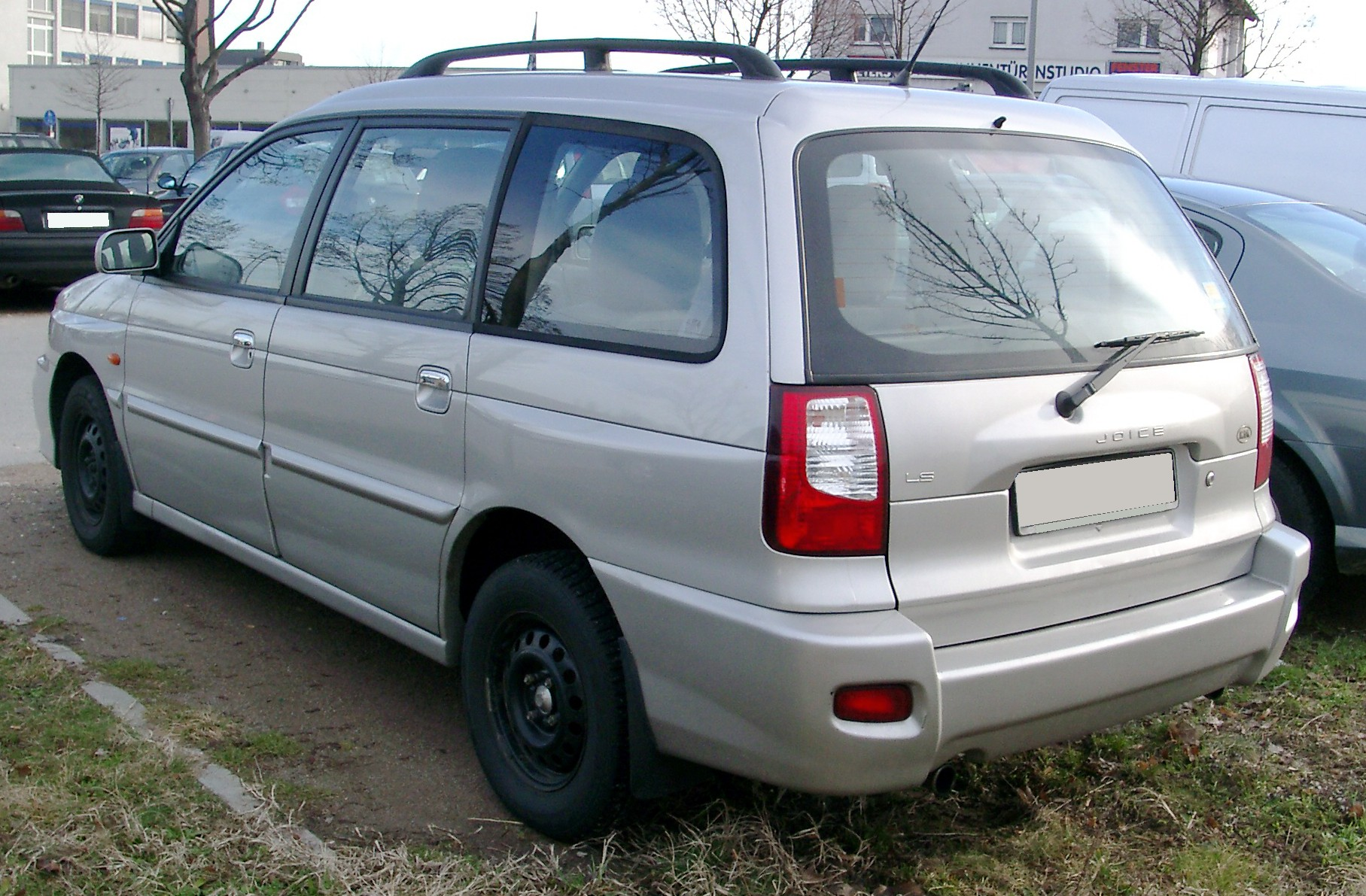
Kia Joice rear

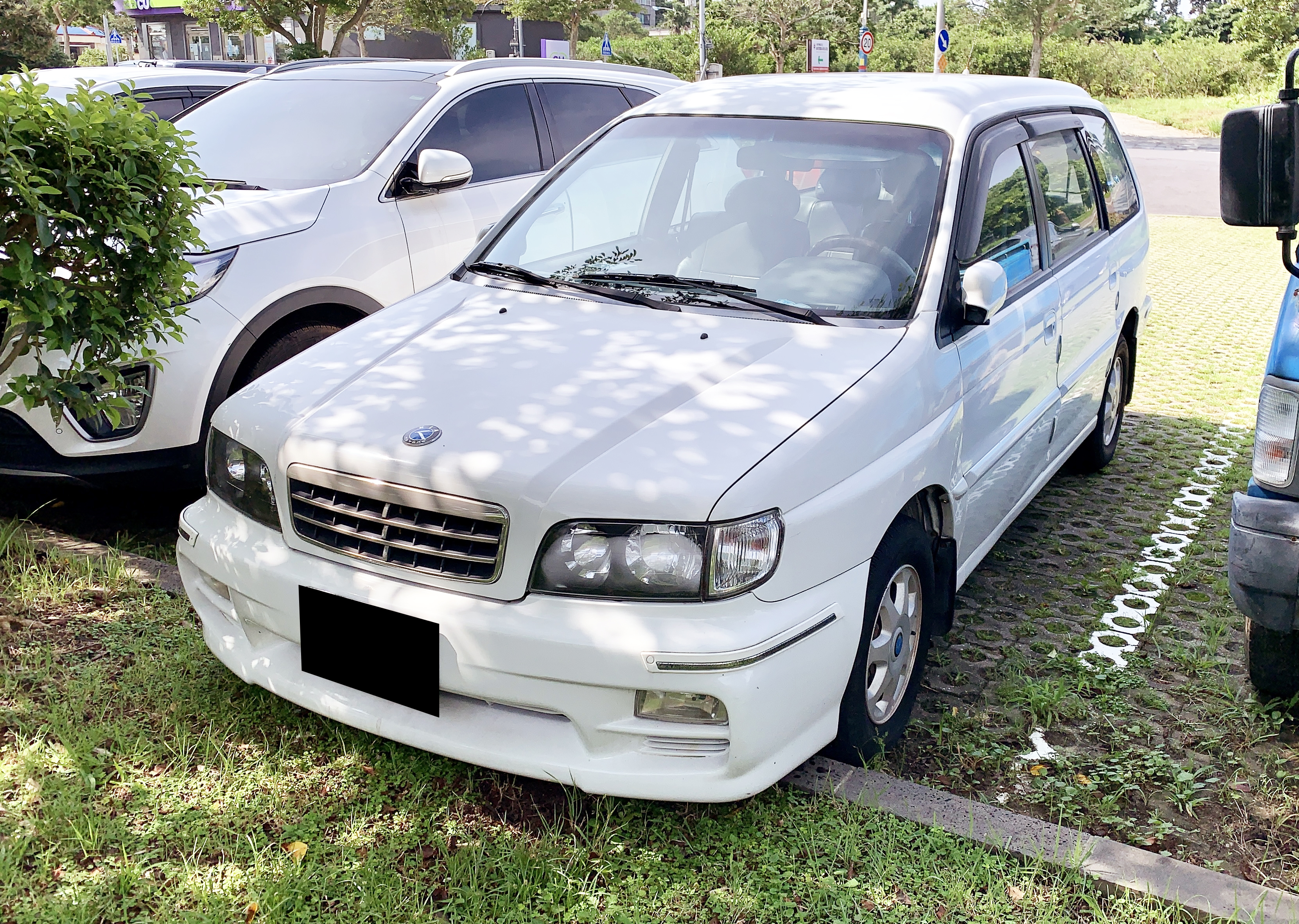
Kia Carstar (South Korea)

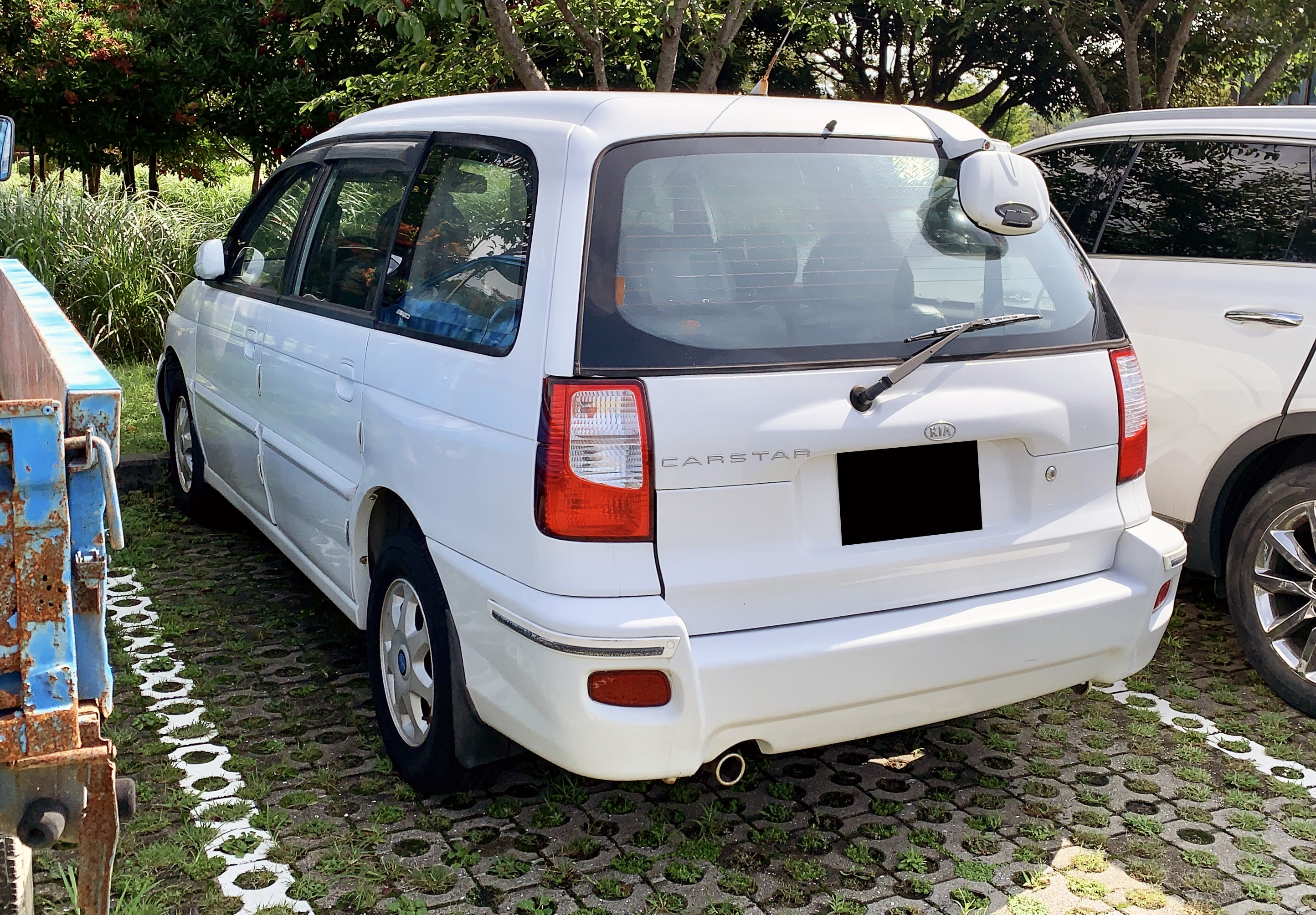
Kia Carstar rear (South Korea)
