= Joice (name) =

Joice is both a given name and a surname. Notable people with the name include:

- Joice Heth (c. 1756–1836), African-American woman exhibited by P.T. Barnum
- Joice NanKivell Loch (1887–1982), Australian author, journalist and humanitarian worker
- Joice Maduaka (born 1973), British sprinter
- Joice Mujuru (born 1955), Zimbabwean revolutionary and politician
- Dick Joice (1921–1999), British regional television presenter
- Wes Joice (1931–1997), American businessman

== See also ==
- Joyce (name), another given name and surname
