= List of storms named Joyce =

The name Joyce has been used for nine tropical cyclones worldwide: four in the Atlantic Ocean, three in the Eastern Pacific Ocean, one in the Western Pacific Ocean, and one in the Australian region.

In the Atlantic:

- Hurricane Joyce (2000) – Category 1 hurricane that approached the Windward Islands
- Tropical Storm Joyce (2012) – weak storm that did not affect land
- Tropical Storm Joyce (2018) – weak storm that did not affect land
- Tropical Storm Joyce (2024) – weak storm that did not affect land

In the Eastern Pacific:

- Tropical Storm Joyce (1966) – stayed at sea
- Tropical Storm Joyce (1970) – did not affect land
- Hurricane Joyce (1974) – Category 1 hurricane that did not affect land

In the Western Pacific:

- Tropical Storm Joyce (1947) (T4710) – did not affect land

In the Australian region:

- Cyclone Joyce (2018) – Category 2 tropical cyclone that caused heavy rainfall over much of Western Australia

== See also ==
- Hurricane Ioke (2006) – Category 5 hurricane and super typhoon that impacted Wake Island; used Hawaiian form of the name Joyce
