= James Joicey =

James Joicey may refer to:

- James Joicey, 1st Baron Joicey (1846–1936), mining businessman and politician
- James John Joicey (1870–1932), entomologist
